= Kevin Larmon =

American artist

- Born: Kevin Larmon; 18 December 1955 (age 70); Syracuse, New York
- Education: Binghamton University
- Known for: Painting
- Awards: Pollock-Krasner Foundation Atlantic-Pacific Fellowship

Kevin Larmon (born December 18, 1955) is an American artist and was assistant monitor of painting at Syracuse University.

== Early life ==
Kevin Larmon was born in Syracuse, New York in 1955. He grew up on a small horse farm. Larmon's mother was a school secretary while his father was a construction worker. He graduated from Binghamton University with a Bachelor of Fine Arts degree and moved to New York City as an undergraduate senior, where he finished his schooling at the New York Studio School. In the late 1970s, Larmon played guitar for Mudmen, a three-piece band in the East Village of New York City with Craig Gillis playing bass, Mike Caffes playing drums, and percussionist Jill Burkhart. Mudmen played in venues such as CBGB, Danceteria, A7 (bar), Pyramid Club, Mudd Club, and The Limelight.

== Work ==
=== Artistic Practice ===
re:will, 2011, 18"x20"

Larmon started making still life paintings in 1979. He has also worked with atmospheric drawings and paintings since 1989, many of which are made on canvas or wood. In 2009, he began to paint his cell paintings.

Larmon's paintings are built up through layers of collage and paint. Most famously, Larmon's work includes collages of gay male pornography that have been painted over with images that exist somewhere in between abstraction and form. These images are often anatomical. Conceptually, Larmon's work deals with issues such as the male body image and fascist culture. Similarly, Larmon's drawings on wood deal with ambiguously anatomical and abstracted forms.

His work has been associated with the post-conceptualism and neo-conceptual art movements, which were prominent aspects of exhibitions at Gallery Nature Morte and with Tricia Collins and Richard Milazzo shaping the nature of painting after the rise of conceptual art. Larmon was also associated with Feature Inc., a gallery that was first established in Chicago in 1984. In August 1988, the gallery's director, known as Hudson, moved Feature Inc. to New York City. Larmon's first exhibition with Feature Inc. occurred in 1987 in Chicago, Illinois. Over the years, Hudson and Larmon would work together on many exhibitions.

=== Influences ===
As a young artist, Larmon spent his Thursdays working to sustain Gallery Nature Morte together with the gallery owners, Alan Becher and Peter Nagy, when the gallery existed in New York City. Larmon was heavily influenced by his contemporaries at Gallery Nature Morte such as Robin Weglinski, Joel Otterson, and Steven Parrino.

Other influential artists include Oliver Wasow, Robert Gober, Nancy Shaver, Carter Hodgkin, and Steven Wolfe. Larmon also drew inspiration from Rembrandt, Giorgio Morandi, Jackson Pollock, and Agnes Martin.

During his time as a professor at Syracuse University, Larmon made an impact on many emerging artists including Deborah Roberts and Paul Weiner.

== Exhibitions ==
=== Early Shows ===
Larmon's first group exhibition, Choices, was presented at the Drawing Center in New York in 1979. In 1982, he exhibited in the New Drawing in America exhibition at the Drawing Center and at the inaugural exhibition of Gallery Nature Morte in New York.

=== 1983–Present ===
Larmon participated in Aperto 86 at the 1986 Venice Biennale in Venice, Italy, where his paintings were exhibited at the Corderie at the Arsenal.

From 1983–2013, Larmon was invited to exhibit in the Metropolitan Museum of Art, New York, New York; Feature Inc, New York, New York; Phoenix Art Museum, Phoenix, Arizona; the University Art Museum at the University of California, Berkeley; the Aldrich Contemporary Art Museum, Ridgefield, Connecticut; Weatherspoon Art Museum at the University of North Carolina, Chapel Hill, North Carolina; Visual Arts Museum, New York, New York; the Morris Museum, Morristown, New Jersey; Cleveland Center for Contemporary Art, now the Museum of Contemporary Art Cleveland, Cleveland, Ohio; Aspen Art Museum, Aspen, Colorado; Jersey City Museum, Jersey City, New Jersey; and the Carpenter Center for the Visual Arts at Harvard University, Cambridge, Massachusetts.

In 2013, Larmon was included in a group show at the Leslie Sacks Gallery in Los Angeles, California alongside artists Christo, Jim Dine, Pablo Picasso, Chuck Close, Howard Hodgkin, Jasper Johns, Marino Marini, Henri Matisse, Karel Nel, Sam Francis, Helen Frankenthaler, David Hockney, Robert Rauschenberg, and Sebastião Salgado.

=== Exhibitions curated by Tricia Collins and Richard Milazzo ===
- Still Life With Transaction: Former Objects, New Moral Arrangements, and the History of Surfaces took place at International with Monument in New York from March 28 – April 21, 1984. Larmon was accompanied by artists Alice Albert, Ericka Beckman, Alan Belcher, Ross Bleckner, Barry Bridgwood, Sarah Charlesworth, Wendy Galavitz, Judy Geib, Jim Jacobs, Stephen Lack, Andrew Masullo, Peter McCaffrey, Jan Mohlman, Peter Nadin, Peter Nagy, Joel Otterson, Richard Prince, Steven Parrino, Tyler Turkle, and Laurie Simmons.
- Natural Genre: From the Neutral Subject to the Hypothesis of World Objects took place at Florida State University Gallery & Museum in Tallahassee, Florida from Aug. 31-Sept. 30, 1984. Larmon was accompanied by artists Jane Bauman, Ericka Beckman, Alan Belcher, Gretchen Bender, Ross Bleckner, Tom Brazleton, Barry Bridgwood, Sarah Charlesworth, Carroll Dunham, Robert Garratt, Mark Innerst, Louise Lawler, Allan McCollum, Peter Nadin, Peter Nagy, Joseph Nechvatal, Steven Parrino, Louis Renzoni, Meyer Vaisman, Oliver Wasow, James Welling, David Wojnarowicz, Michael Zwack.
- Still Life With Transaction II: Former Objects, New Moral Arrangements, and the History of Surfaces took place at Galerie Jurka in Amsterdam during November 1984. Larmon was accompanied by artists Alice Albert, Ericka Beckman, Alan Belcher, Ross Bleckner, Barry Bridgwood, Sarah Charlesworth, Wendy Galavitz, Judy Geib, Jim Jacobs, Stephen Lack, Peter McCaffrey, Peter Nadin, Peter Nagy, Joel Otterson, Richard Prince, Laurie Simmons, Tyler Turkle, Meyer Vaisman, and Oliver Wasow.
- Final Love took place at the C.A.S.H./Newhouse Gallery in New York from March 15 – April 14, 1985. Larmon was accompanied by artists Ross Bleckner, Peter Halley, Jonathan Lasker, Allan McCollum, Olivier Mosset, Peter Nadin, Bonnie Nielson, Meyer Vaisman, Wallace & Donohue, James Welling, and Stephen Westfall.
- Cult and Decorum took place at Tibor De Nagy Gallery in New York from December 7, 1985 – January 4, 1986. Larmon was accompanied by artists Ross Bleckner, Sarah Charlesworth, David Diao, Peter Halley, Jeff Koons, Jonathan Lasker, Peter Nadin, Joel Otterson, Ricardo Regazzoni, Robin Rose, Laurie Simmons, Haim Steinbach, Gary Stephan, Philip Taaffe, and Meyer Vaisman.
- Modern Sleep took place at American Fine Arts Co. in New York from October 17 – November 16, 1986. Larmon was accompanied by artists Saint Clair Cemin, John Dogg, Tishan Hsu, Jonathan Lasker, Annette Lemieux, Olivier Mosset, Joel Otterson, and Jeffrey Plate.
- Art at the End of the Social took place at The Rooseum in Malmö, Sweden from July – October, 1988. Larmon was accompanied by artists Donald Baechler, Ford Beckman, Gretchen Bender, Ross Bleckner, David Carrino, Lawrence Carroll, Saint Clair Cemin, Sarah Charlesworth, Charles Clough, David Diao, John Dogg, Suzan Etkin, Peter Fend, Robert Gober, Peter Halley, Claudia Hart, Tishan Hsu, Jon Kessler, Jeff Koons, Jonathan Lasker, Annette Lemieux, Allan McCollum, Peter Nadin, Peter Nagy, Joseph Nechvatal, Joel Otterson, Richard Prince, Holt Quentel, Sal Scarpitta, Nancy Shaver, Haim Steinbach, Gary Stephan, Philip Taaffe, Tyler Turkle, Meg Webster, and James Welling.

=== Exhibitions at Feature Inc. ===
- Head Sex took place at Feature Inc. in Chicago, Illinois from July 7 - August 7, 1987. Larmon was accompanied by artists Kathe Burkhart, General Idea, Mike Kelley, Lillian Mulero, Raymond Pettibon, Johnny Pixchure, Richard Prince, Kay Rosen, Rene Santos, and Kevin Wolff.
- HOHOHOMO took place at Feature Inc. in New York, New York from December 10, 1988 - January 7, 1989. Larmon was accompanied by artists Arnold Fern, Richard Hawkins, Johnny Pixchure, and Kevin Wolff.
- Strung Into the Apollonian Dream... took place at Feature Inc. in New York, New York from January 20 - February 24, 1995. Larmon was accompanied by artists Michael Banicki, Nancy Chunn, Tom Friedman, Felix Gonzalez-Torres, Jenny Holzer, Peter Huttinger, Mike Kelley, Louise Lawler, Sherrie Levine, Allan McCollum, David Moreno, Hirsch Perlman, Raymond Pettibon, Adrian Piper, Richard Prince, David Robbins, Rene Santos, Nancy Shaver, Jim Shaw, Cindy Sherman, Elaine Sturtevant, Tony Tasset, James Welling, Kevin Wolff, and B. Wurtz.
- I Gaze a Gazely Stare took place at Feature Inc. in New York, New York from March 9 - April 14, 1995. Larmon was accompanied by Jeanne Dunning, Robert Flack, Jason Curtis Fox, Tom Friedman, Jim Isermann, Pruitt-Early, Brett Reichman, Richard Rezac, David Robbins, and Nancy Shaver.
- THOUGHTS took place at Feature Inc. in New York, New York from April 14 – May 19, 2007. Larmon was accompanied by Pam Golden, Jonathan Heartshorn, Andrew Masullo, Tracy Miller, Travis Molkenbur, David Moreno, Oren Slor, the unnameable, and Tyler Vlahovich.
- Power to the People took place at Feature Inc. in New York, New York on May 1, 2010. Larmon was accompanied by over three hundred artists. Each artist donated a work of art to be taken away for free.
- Tom of Finland and then Some took place at Feature Inc. in New York, New York from June 25 - July 31, 2010. Larmon was accompanied by Tom of Finland, Richard Kern, Judy Linn, Bastille, Jerry Phillips, Martin of Holland, Joe Brainard, Fred Esher, Larry Clark, Robert W. Richards and Brian Kenny, Sean Landers, Richard Prince, Robert Fontanelli, GB Jones, Jeff Burton, Mie Yim, Raymond Pettibon, Catherine Opie, Carl Ferrero, Jared Buckhiester, Judy Rifka, Jeffrey Pittu, Scooter LaForge, The Hun, Tyler Ingolia, David Frye, Kinke Kooi, Juan Gomez, Rex, and Gengoroh Tagame.

== Collections ==
Larmon's works are in the collections of the Metropolitan Museum of Art, New York, New York; the Museum of Contemporary Art, Los Angeles, California; the Walker Art Center, Minneapolis, Minnesota; the Archer M. Huntington Art Gallery in the Blanton Museum of Art at the University of Texas at Austin, Austin, Texas; the Chase Manhattan Bank NA, New York, New York; the McCrory Corporation Collection; the Progressive Corporation Collection, Cleveland, Ohio; and the Prudential Insurance Company Collection.

Larmon's work titled "Hunter" sold at auction during Christie's 2005 "The House Sale" in New York.

== Critical responses ==
=== Positive ===
Holland Cotter said Larmon's painting installation in The Cathedral Project was "the most cohesive part of the show, largely because it is concentrated in a small side chapel. Most of the pieces were executed on wood panels that belonged to another artist, Tom Brazelton, who died of AIDS last year. Together they serve as a memorial to him, and they add up to Mr. Larmon's best recent work."

Ken Johnson (art critic) claimed that Larmon's "stained, yellow-glazed canvases have a quality of Old Masterish romanticism."

=== Negative ===
Roberta Smith critiqued Larmon's work regarding size and style in 1989. "Kevin Larmon's paintings are getting larger and more ambitious, which they needed to do, but most are somewhat weaker for the effort. Increasing the size reduces the preciousness of these works, which is good, but venturing toward trompe l'oeil, as Mr. Larmon seems to be doing, is a mistake."

== See also ==
- Lyrical abstraction
- Post-conceptualism
