= Steven Parrino =

American artist (1958–2005)

- Born: 1958; New York City, U.S.
- Died: January 1, 2005 (aged 46–47); New York City, U.S.
- Education: Parsons
- Known for: Artist, Noise musician
- Movement: Postmodern, East Village

Steven Parrino (1958–2005) was an American artist and noise musician associated with punk and post-punk nihilism. He is best known for creating big modernist monochrome paintings (his colors were limited to monochrome black (or black-and-white), orange, red, blue, and silver) that he violently slashed, torn or twisted off their stretchers. He died in a motorcycle traffic accident in Greenpoint, Brooklyn at the age of 46.

== Art work ==
Parrino was born in New York City in 1958 and grew up on Long Island. The family was originally from Sicily. He earned an associate of applied science degree from SUNY Farmingdale in 1979 and a bachelor of fine arts degree from Parsons The New School for Design in 1982, but Parrino began producing art at the end of the 1970s. His oeuvre includes paintings, sculpture collage, film, sound recordings, text and drawings. He was driven, as he said himself, by his ‘necrophiliac interest’ in painting, which at that time had been pronounced dead. As early as 1981 he detached the canvas from the stretcher in places to create rough, folded, cleft surfaces, thus achieving a literal deconstruction of painting.

Parrino first showed his paintings of deep-seated pessimism at Gallery Nature Morte, an East Village gallery, in 1984, when he emerged as part of a strain of postmodernism called Neo-Geo post-conceptual art. The idea of neo-conceptual art (sometimes later termed post-conceptual art) was clearly articulated for Parrino by Tricia Collins and Richard Milazzo in the early 1980s when they brought to prominence a whole new generation of artists through their copious writings and curatorial activity. It was their exhibitions and writings that originally fashioned the theoretical context for Parrino's new kind of neo (or post) conceptual art; one that argued simultaneously against Neo-Expressionism and The Pictures Generation. It was through this context that the work of many of the artists associated with Neo-Conceptualism (or what some of the critics reductively called Simulationism and Neo Geo) was first brought together: artists such as Parrino, Ross Bleckner, James Welling, Richard Prince, Peter Nagy, Joseph Nechvatal, Sarah Charlesworth, Mark Innerst, Allan McCollum, Peter Halley, Jonathan Lasker, Haim Steinbach, Philip Taaffe, Robert Gober and Saint Clair Cemin.

Within this context Parrino called his mauled canvases, such as Untitled Painting No. 4 (2000), misshaped paintings in cheeky response to the shaped paintings of the sixties.

Steven Parrino, Untitled Painting No. 4 (2000) acrylic on canvas. 39¾x39¾in (101x101cm) Collection of The Box Associati Gallery, Turin

In addition to painting, Parrino exhibited painted environments that involved monochrome walls pounded with sledgehammers such as the 13 plaster panels painted black and smashed to pieces as a memorial to the Punk legend Joey Ramone called 13 Shattered Panels for Joey Ramone (2001). He also made films of the making of these environments along with sleek metal sculptures whose bent and folded elements related to his misshaped canvases. He also exhibited photographs of his desktop strewn with the newspaper stories, magazine spreads and music albums that often inspired him. Parrino used intentionally provocative subjects like abstract swastikas, rebel flags, and silhouettes of Russ Meyer starlets, Elvis Presley as rendered by Andy Warhol, the Hells Angels, Johnny Cash, and other works by Andy Warhol. His work has been called "mannered, Romantic, formulaic, conceptualist-formalist heavy-metal boy-art abstraction" by the art critic Jerry Saltz.

== Noise music ==
Parrino also played electric guitar in several downtown bands, most recently Electrophilia, a two-person group he formed with the painter and keyboardist Jutta Koether. In 1999, a CD titled Electrophilia – Live France 1999 was released by Le Consortium in Dijon, France. It is a live recording from two noise music concerts that Parrino gave: one at La Chapelle, École Nationale des Beaux-Arts in Bourges on March 24, 1999 and the other at Le Consortium in Dijon on March 26, 1999.

Also an LP record of his audio work was released in 2002 titled Steven Parrino - Electrophilia / Shock Wave Troop (2002) with three pieces on it: Helen Fordsdale, Eulogy For Dead Jerks and Shock Wave Troop. It is a 10-inch LP record that was released in an edition of 400 by Circuit in Lausanne, Switzerland.

Several videos document Parrino as a performer and the central role played by music in his life and work. In a noise music work titled Guitar Grind (1995), he rubbed his bass guitar up against an electric guitar, causing the two instruments to scream feedback through the amplifiers.

Parrino did the cover art for Tellus Audio Cassette Magazine #20 titled Media Myth (1988), for The Melvins LP It Tastes Better Than the Truth (2003) and for Thurston Moore's CD Demolished Thoughts (2011).

== Black Noise book ==
A book titled Black Noise – A Tribute to Steven Parrino was released by JRP|Ringier in 2007. It was made up of a series of 32 artist books in a boxset, in the comic book format, conceived in tribute to the late Steven Parrino. 250 copies limited edition. Each volume was signed by a different artist, linked in some way to Steven Parrino, by projects and exchanges, by friendship, by reciprocal inspiration.

== The No Texts book ==
A 56-page book of Steven Parrino's art theory writings, edited by Lionel Bovier, titled The No Texts: An anthology of writings was released by Abaton Book Company in 2003.

== Necropolis (The Lucifer Crank) for Anger film ==
Parrino's 22 minutes long, black and white, super 16 mm film Necropolis (The Lucifer Crank) for Anger (2004), made in collaboration with Amy Granat and Larry Seven, is in the collection of the Centre Pompidou in Paris.

== Reception ==
Until his death, Parrino's work had drawn little attention in the United States. After completing his BFA degree at the Parsons School of Design in 1982, Parrino first showed his postmodern Neo-conceptual art paintings in 1984 at the Gallery Nature Morte, an East 10th Street artist run gallery. Steered by essays in the Effects: Magazine for New Art Theory magazine, the East Village in Manhattan in the 1980s was the epicenter of a downtown bohemianism and of post-punk no wave art that challenged prevailing neo-expressionism critical theory. In 1985 he participated in the traveling Infotainment art exhibition organized by independent curator Anne Livet in collaboration with Nature Morte’s directors, Peter Nagy and Alan Belcher. It featured the work East Village artists interested in media critique and evolving post-conceptual nihilist strategies; including Gretchen Bender, Peter Halley, Joseph Nechvatal and Haim Steinbach.

His seemingly abused and tortured canvases was almost always consisted of a physical assault on modernist Ad Reinhardt-like black monochrome abstract painting, that was at the time was widely considered dead. He also exhibited painted environments that involved monochrome walls pounded with sledgehammers, bent sleek metal sculptures, and figurative collages. In total, Parrino had nine solo shows in New York City (the last ones at the Swiss Institute Contemporary Art New York in 2002 and at Team Gallery in 2004) and showed in galleries and museum in Europe, where his work was more widely appreciated than in the United States.

Six years after his death, there was a retrospective exhibition of his work at the Palais de Tokyo in Paris called La Marque Noire (The Black Mark) and a commercial presentation of the paintings at the Gagosian Gallery space on Madison Avenue. Also, Parrino's work has been included in the Whitney Biennial 2006: Day for Night at the Whitney Museum of American Art (2006), The Painted World at P.S.1 Contemporary Art Center (2005) and The Indiscipline of Painting at the Tate St. Ives that toured to Warwick Arts Centre (2011/12). Solo exhibitions of his work have included the Musée d'Art Moderne et Contemporain in Geneva (2006). In 2022, Galerie Loevenbruck in Paris exhibited his drawings and other graphic artworks. In 2019 his paintings were exhibited in New York City on East 64th Street at the Skarstedt Gallery in a show called Paintings And Drawings, 1986-2003.

In 2016, fashion designer Rick Owens included a number of Parrino's paintings in his Museum of Contemporary Art, Los Angeles exhibition Rick Owens: Furniture and again in 2025, in his retrospective exhibition at Palais Galliera Paris Temple of Love.

Steven Parrino's estate is represented by the Gagosian Gallery.
