= Effects: Magazine for New Art Theory =

American arts magazine

Effects: Magazine for New Art Theory was an American arts magazine. It was co-published and co-edited by Tricia Collins and Richard Milazzo from 1983 to 1986 in New York City. All issues were offset-printed staple bound 27.7 x 21.3 cm.

== Magazine issues ==
Cover of Effects: Magazine for New Art Theory, Semblance and Mediation No. 1 (Summer 1983) by Robert Longo

- Semblance and Mediation No. 1 (Summer 1983) contained contributions by Geralyn Donohue, David Salle, Joan Wallace, Troy Brauntuch, Barbara Kruger, Mark Innerst, Richard Prince, Ericka Beckman, Jack Goldstein, Gretchen Bender, Ross Bleckner, Louise Lawler, Allan McCollum, Peter Nagy, Tyler Turkle, Steven Parrino, Tricia Collins, and Richard Milazzo. Cover art by Robert Longo.
- Concept and the New Content, No. 2 (1984) contained contributions from Ericka Beckman, Gretchen Bender, Ross Bleckner, Don Bonham, Peter Carravetta, Sarah Charlesworth, Barbara Kruger, Stephen Lack, Louise Lawler, Robert Longo, Peter McCaffrey, Allan McCollum, Jan Mohlman, Peter Nagy, Joel Otterson, Steven Parrino, Richard Prince, Eric Sparre, Gaetano Testa, Joan Wallace and Geralyn Donohue, James Welling, Michael Zwack. Cover art by Steven Parrino.
- Neutral Trends I, No. 3 (Winter 1986) contained contributions by Tricia Collins, Richard Milazzo, Allan McCollum, James Welling, Oliver Wasow, Carroll Dunham, Tom Brazelton, Ettore Bonessio di Terzat, Frank Majore, Peter Nadin, Robin Weglinkski, Joseph Nechvatal, Meyer Vaisman, Peter Halley, Carlo McCormick, Julie Wachtel, David Robbins, Barry Bridgwood, Kevin Larmon, Gérald Van Der Kaap, Peter Klashorst, Jonathan Lasker, Richard Milani, Franco Marinai, Richard Prince, Vikky Alexander, Joseph Masheck, Craig Adcock, Mark Innerst, Jane Bauman, Susan Davis, Giuseppe Salvatori and Sarah Charlesworth. Cover art by Sarah Charlesworth.

== See also ==
- Collins & Milazzo Exhibitions
