= Neogeo (art) =

1980s art movement

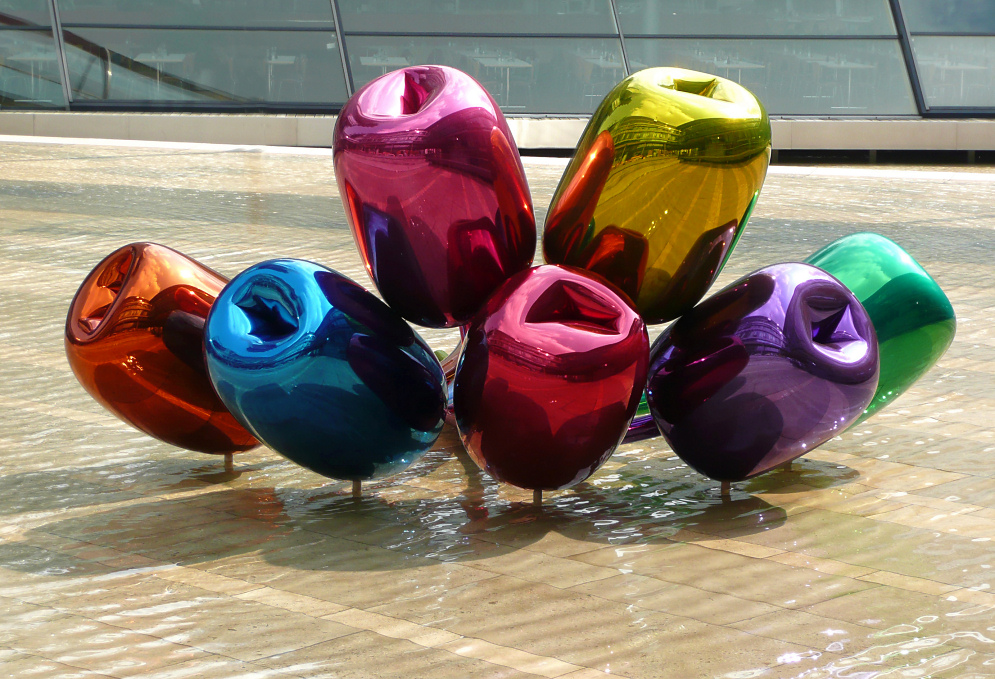
Jeff Koons’ Tulips

Neo-geo or Neo-Geometric Conceptualism is an art movement from the 1980s that utilizes geometric abstraction and criticizes the industrialism and consumerism of modern society. The usage of the term neo-geo began when it was first used in reference to a 1986 exhibition at the Sonnabend Gallery in SoHo that included the artwork of Ashley Bickerton, Jeff Koons, Peter Halley and Meyer Vaisman. According to artist Michael Young, Neo-geo artwork recognizes technology as both a promise and a threat.

== Naming ==
Curators, acquisitors, and artists within the movement could not come to an agreement on the name of the movement, leaving the world with more than one name for the art movement.

A pair of curators and writers, Tricia Collins and Richard Milazzo working together to create many Collins & Milazzo exhibitions felt that Post-Conceptualism was the best fitting term, as it highlighted the magnification of ideas. Many artists within the movement, such as Peter Halley, rejected the name “Neo-Geo” because it seemed too catchy and therefore consumerist. Halley preferred the term Simulationism because it referred technology replacing nature. In the 1987 New York Times newspaper article, “What Do You Call Art’s Newest Trend: ‘Neo-Geo’...Maybe”, he explains that “air conditioning is a simulation of air; movies are a simulation of life; life is simulated by bio-mechanical manipulations”.

Eugene Schwartz dubbed the movement Post-Abstract Abstraction as it was for him a new version of 1960s abstraction that creates alternative meanings.

Peter Nagy wished for the movement to be untitled. He believed that once you give art a name, the movement is destroyed.

Some critics pondered whether the movement had enough originality to be singled out as its own movement, as it bore too many similarities to prior movements such as Geometric Abstract Art and Pop Art.

== Neogeo Research ==
Art historian and curator Amy L. Brandt provided the first comprehensive survey of neogeo artists that included Sherrie Levine, Allan McCollum, Haim Steinbach, Jeff Koons, Peter Halley, Ashley Bickerton, and Meyer Vaisman. Brandt focused on their artistic perspective, examining each artists' exposure to structuralism and poststructuralism theory. Other topics covered include East Village culture in the 1980s and the influence of postwar French theory. Brandt connected each artists' works to Pop Art, Minimalism, Neo-minimalism, Conceptualism, and the Pictures Generation group.

== Influences ==
Neo-geo artwork was influenced by earlier movements of the twentieth century, including minimalism, pop art, and op art. Additionally, ideas about postmodernism and hyperreality inspired those within the neo-geo movement. Many neo-geo artists were influenced by French thinker Jean Baudrillard. One of Baudrillard's arguments is that needs are constructed rather than natural. According to Tate, Geometry was a way in which artists represented ideas like Jean Baudrillard's, with geometry as a metaphor for the modern world because shapes are constructed.

== Early Artists ==
- Ashley Bickerton
- Ross Bleckner
- Peter Halley
- Jeff Koons
- Allan McCollum
- Haim Steinbach
- Philip Taaffe
- Meyer Vaisman
- DoDoU
- Michael Young
- Peter Nagy
- Robert_Gober

== Early Artwork ==
- Peter Halley, Sonnabend Gallery Exhibit, 1989
- Jeff Koons, “Equilibrium: Encased - One Row”, 1983
- Haim Steinbach, “Ultra Red #2”, 1986
