= Robin Hill (American artist) =

American visual artist

- Born: Nottingham, England
- Education: Kansas City Art Institute
- Known for: Sculpture, Drawing, cyanotypes
- Awards: University of California, Davis New Initiative/Collaborative Research Award, New York Foundation for the Arts Artist Fellowship, National Endowment for the Arts grant, and Pollock-Krasner Foundation grant.
- Website: www.robin-hill.net

Robin Hill is an American visual artist whose work focuses on the intersection between drawing, photography, and sculpture. Since 2001, she has been on the faculty of the Art Studio Program in the Department of Art and Art History at the University of California, Davis.

== Professional career ==
Since completing her BFA at Kansas City Art Institute in 1977, Hill has exhibited with Lang & O'Hara Gallery (1987, 1989, 1991), Lennon Weinberg(1995, 1997, 2004, 2011), Eli Marsh Gallery(1997), Fotofest (2000), State University of New York at Purchase Gallery (2001), Project Row Houses (2002), University of California, Davis Art Center (2003), Centre International d'Art Contemporain, Pont-Aven, FR (2005), California State University, Stanislaus Gallery (2006), Dan Soker Gallery (2003 and 2007), Another Year in LA (2006, 2011, 2015) Lesley Heller Project Space(2007), Jay Jay Gallery (2008), Shasta College Gallery (2009), and Ramon's Tailor (2014).

Additionally, she has participated in hundreds of group exhibitions such as “Get Lucky: The Culture of Chance” (2012) at SOMArts, San Francisco, CA; "Emergence and Structure" (2012), University of Florida Gallery, which traveled to Freedom Tower/Miami Dade College, and Lafayette College; “Tomorrow’s Legacy: Gifts Celebrating the Next 125 Years”(2011) at the Crocker Art Museum; “Synthesis and Distribution, Experiments in Collaboration” (2005), for which she collaborated with Stephen Kaltenbach at Pace University Art Gallery; and “Thinking in Line: A Survey of Contemporary Drawing” (2004), curated by Ron Janowich for University of Florida Gallery.

In addition to having collaborated with Kaltenbach, Hill has collaborated with Ulla Warchol (exhibiting as Biolunar) and Mathematician Janko Gravner, who co-discovered the snowflake algorithm.

== Work ==
=== Sculpture ===
In addition to locating Hill's work "at the crossroads of the mundane and the mystical, where he physical object pulls us into invisible realms," Raphael Rubinstein has remarked upon the "sense of epic labor" accompanying many of her sculptures, as well as how "hers is a hybrid art in its seamless joining of the found and the handmade." Denise Carvalho describes Hill as "attached to the potentiality of materials; whether they are found, purchased, or inherited."

In the 1980s, art writers discussed Robin Hill's sculptures in the context sculptors such as Tom Butter, Saint Clair Cemin, John Duff, Fortuyn O'Brien, Robert Gober, Steve Keister, Mel Kendrick, and Joel Otterson. This generation of sculptors were known for conveying content from "gentle craft substances: fiberglass, beeswax, veneered wood, string, paper, pigment and fabric." That era's critics recognized Hill's life-size, weighty, abstract sculptures for signaling a revived interest in body art, as well as the figure, which remains the hallmark of 90s sculpture. In Michael Brenson's 1986 New York Times art review, he describes her work At Arm's Length as suggesting "hills, bones, and cliffs, but it can also bring to mind the characteristic body shift of Greek and Renaissance standing figures."

In the 1990s, Hill started exhibiting sculptures made from series of identical objects. Kristin Koster remarks, "Today, amid a vast cadre off artists who reuse; recycle; or re-purpose the cast away materials that populate their environments; Hill stands apart as a disinterested collector; and as a kind of aristocratic flaneur of the everyday....She never makes use, cycles, or purpose: instead she makes visible, resurrects, and liberates."

=== Drawing ===
In 1995, Hill exhibited Blue Lines, five monumental drawings, "each one nine-feet tall, made on four-part panels of specially-waxed paper. All are done only in blue on white; recalling Delft tiles; and all consist of four-part units generated from the same curved line; repeated and overlaid on itself in various ways." Lacking a beginning or end, Hill considers her oil-stick drawings roadmaps, capable of leading viewers on a visual journey. Accompanying these drawings were three massive mandala-like forms, which she formed by lining up 4000 identical plaster cones that were cast using Dixie paper cups, then dipped in ballpoint-blue paint, and sprawled on the floor in patterns recalling cloverleaf interchanges. Hill's drawings are featured in Lines of Vision: Drawings by Contemporary Women.

After a 2013 summer residency at the Sanskritti Foundation in New Delhi, Hill made 300 rubbings of the same 1960s Eastman Kodak slide carousel, which she mounted on the walls, partly overlapping one another. Recalling her decision to do so, Hill adds, "My idea of drawing is that I could cultivate that sense of being really engaged and not worrying about the future, or what the work means in terms of the overarching ideas, and just be deeply involved in my work."

=== Cyanotypes ===
Hill's 1995 exhibition featured a cyanotype, evoking an X-ray of the "axial skeleton of some organism, or the molecular structure of a particular substance." In 1997, she exhibited a "16' x 13' cyanotype drawing made of hundreds of six-inch 'photographs' of ephemeral matter (strands of scotch tape). This 'curtain' serve[d] as a type of atmospheric stage for the two works on the floor of the main gallery." In 2001, she exhibited Sweet Everyday, a 100-foot long cyanotype enwrapping Lennon, Weinberg, Inc.'s Soho gallery in a David Reed-like wavy brushstroke, created by placing ordinary shopping bags on photo-sensitive paper exposed to light. Several white plastic bags hovered in the gallery, echoed by the banner's billowing shapes.

Hill elaborates, "The immediacy of this process serves as a counterpoint to the more deliberate and labor-intensive tasks of building sculptural forms, whose invisible dimensions are revealed in the after images of their companion cyanotypes."

=== Sound Art ===
In 2006, Hill collaborated with fellow UC-Davis faculty member Sam Nichols on Kardex, an interactive sound work featuring a steel cabinet, whose 29 drawers each frame one of Hill's photographs of a friends' ears. Opening up the drawers "triggered Nichols's MIDI-to-Mac hookup mechanism." Each drawer played a recorded everyday sound, such as footsteps, running water, numbers being dialed, sanding, etc.

== Public collections ==
Hill’s work has been collected by Planet Fitness, Achenbach Foundation for Graphic Arts, Legion of Honor; Rosewood Sand Hill, Menlo Park, CA; Brooklyn Union Gas, Chatham Imports, New York; Champion International Paper, Cleary Gottlieb, New York; Cowan, Liebowitz & Latman, P.C. New York; Federal Home Loan Mortgage Corporation, Fogg Art Museum, Richard L. Nelson Gallery, University of California, Davis; Rosenthal & Rosenthal, New York, NY; Milbank, Tweed, Hadley and McCloy; Prudential Insurance Company, Bingham, Dana & Gould, Boston, MA; Lee & Silva Terry, Atlanta, GA; Long Island University, Wynn Kramarsky, New York, NY; Hammer Museum; Crocker Art Museum, and Jones Day, Cleveland, OH; The Rosewood Mansion on Turtle Creek; and Jan Shrem and Maria Manetti Shrem Museum of Art, Davis, CA.

== Teaching ==
In 2007, Hill was appointed to professor at University of California, Davis. Prior to being hired there as an assistant professor in 2001, Hill held numerous teaching positions in the art departments of State University of New York at Purchase (1998-2001), Parsons School of Design (1991-2001), Rhode Island School of Design(1997-1998) and Middlebury College(1991). Additionally; she has served as a Visiting Artist at Amherst College, Anderson Ranch, Bennington College, Brandeis University, Brooklyn College, California State University, Sacramento and California State University, Stanislaus, Claremont Graduate University, Empire State College, Haverford College, Kansas City Art Institute, Lafayette College, Maryland Institute College of Art, Middlebury College, Muhlenberg College, Parsons School of Design, Pont-Aven School of Art, Purdue University, Rhode Island School of Design, School of the Museum of Fine Arts, Boston, Arkansas State University, Jonesboro, Syracuse University, Union College, University of Iowa, University of California, Riverside, University of Oregon, Virginia Commonwealth University

== Awards, fellowships, and residencies ==
In addition to having received a University of California, Davis New Initiative/Collaborative Research Award, two New York Foundation for the Arts Fellowships, a National Endowment for the Arts grant, and two Pollock-Krasner Foundation grants, Hill has been awarded numerous university grants to support her teaching, travel and research. In 2012, she was awarded a residency at the Sanskriti Foundation in New Delhi, India.
