= Sharon Gold =

American painter

- UNTITLED, 1977, acrylic on canvas over wood, 96" x 48" x 2 1/4”, installation view from OK Harris Gallery, 1977, New York City.
- Born: Sharon Gold; 28 February 1949 (age 77); New York City, New York
- Education: Hunter College; Columbia University; Pratt Institute (BFA)
- Known for: Painting
- Awards: National Endowment for the Arts; MacDowell Colony; Penny McCall Foundation; Pratt Institute

Sharon Gold (born February 28, 1949) is an American artist and associate professor of painting at Syracuse University. Gold's artwork has been installed at MoMA PS1, Dia Art Foundation, Carnegie Mellon University, Rose Art Museum at Brandeis University, Everson Museum of Art, and Princeton University Art Museum. She was a fellow at MacDowell Colony. Gold's work has been reviewed by Arthur Danto, Donald Kuspit, Ken Johnson, and Stephen Westfall in a variety of publications from Artforum to the New York Times, New York Magazine, Arts Magazine, Art News, and many others. She also taught at Princeton University, Pratt Institute, Virginia Commonwealth University, University of Texas at San Antonio, San Francisco Art Institute, and the Tyler School of Art. Gold received a National Endowment for the Arts fellowship and wrote for Re-View Magazine, M/E/A/N/I/N/G/S, and Artforum. Her artwork spans across minimalism, monochromatic abstraction, geometric abstraction, and representational painting and is conceptually informed by structuralism, existential formalism, and feminist theory.

== Early life ==
Sharon Gold is a native Bengali born in the Bronx. She grew up attuned to the arts, especially music. Gold attended The High School of Music & Art and later went on to study at Hunter College and Columbia University before graduating from Pratt Institute with a BFA in painting.

== Work ==
Gold rose to prominence in the late 1970s and 1980s with her monochromatic paintings that inhabited a space of existential formalism. She gained recognition in 1979 with reviews in Art in America and Artforum written by Hal Foster and Donald Kuspit. Through the years, her work has experienced a variety of transformations that follow a clear and gradual path from monochromatic abstraction and existentialism to direct representation.

=== Monochromatic series ===
Starting in 1974, Gold began to work with monochromatic paintings composed with "thick skins of dark, near-black paint, textured with palette knife, so as to obscure zones of primary color (in the paintings) and earthy color (in the drawings). The shock of the gesturalism is such that it devalues the vibrant latency of the color (which is nonetheless intuited)." Gold develops vast layers of illusionistic transparency and painterly opacity, yet her systematic paint handling defies each of these conventional painterly modes. The cruciform bands apparent within these paintings are determined by systematic painterly choices existing in Gold's underpaintings that remain exposed in the final piece.

Gold's painted language becomes a phenomenologically imbued surface that embodies structuralist semiotics as embedded in color and painted forms. Donald Kuspit creates a comparison between Gold and her peers working with existential formalism: ""Sharon Gold's paintings are a significant part of this subjectivization, in that they make an advance in tension without positing an advance in expressionism, without moving into the exaggerated expressionism that seems to be proposed by both body art and environmental art. By staying with the body of the painting itself, she curbs its expressionistic tendencies without discharging them, so that, for all their visibility, they function subliminally rather than directly. this is confirmed by the fact that her visible surface, as Masheck says, subsumes an invisible, if felt and glimpsed, surface of color, that a sense of impacted coloristic possibility emerges through the actuality of the surface. The perceived activity of the surface becomes problematic, and opens the way to a conceivable, if unspecifiable depth of meaning that appropriately remains in the physical, as well as psychic, depths."

=== Geometric and Transitional Geometric series ===
In 1979, Gold broke from the monochromatic process to create paintings that allowed first for the intuitive composition of space and later for painterly mark making. As such, her way of being "color-shy, distrustful of the power of color or color-names" was replaced by the play of painterly process. With the removal of the monochromatic surface, geometric forms pull to the foreground of the paintings, which were realized by Gold "in accordance with my sense of intuition and reason." Stephen Westfall explains in an Arts Magazine review that "the main differences between Gold’s work then and now are that she’s drawing more within the boundaries of her interlocking planes, there’s movement to the planes themselves (they’re not as locked into the rectangle of the canvas, even if they remain parallel to it), and there’s a wider color range. Her marks used to be, as she has written, 'a consequence of putting paint down on a surface.' They’re grown into lyrical gestures that resonate with the natural landscape and the figure." These paintings became a transformative step towards an inclusive form of mark making that can be seen in Gold's trajectory toward not only painterly abstraction but the introduction of unabashedly illusionistic representational painting in later works.

=== Nature (as) Imagined series ===
Following her period of geometric abstraction, Gold began working on even more intuitive works that took on biomorphic features that hint at representational landscapes. The organic referentiality of these pieces is another step in Gold's development out of process based work and into an intuitive practice. These paintings maintain the materiality and concern for surface that exist in her earlier monochrome and geometric works while taking on the illusion of nature as a subject. In 1986, Stephen Westfall described the transformation Gold made in painting this new series, "The disappearance of geometry from Gold's paintings would be a startling enough development, considering how little time has elapsed between her last exhibition and the work currently on view at the Pam Adler Gallery, and also compared with the rate of change in her work over the last decade. But the stunner is just how descriptive the new paintings really are, not simply their depicted forms but their glowing passages of light. She's painting with the brush, almost staining in some areas, in glistening transparencies that achieve an old masterish luminosity as they build up. The forms she's painting now call to mind water, spores, suns, spirit shapes, and mountains. The iconography recalls Dove, Hartley, and O'Keeffe, but the materiality of Gold's paint, its wetness and fluidity, is much more in evidence. The emphasis on the material and the increased scale of her pictures are very much a reflection of attitudes fostered by Abstract Expressionism. In a sense they forge a missing link between these two great periods of twentieth-century American painting. It is ironic that such a bridge of styles can only be accomplished in retrospect and doubly ironic that her dialogue with the past is what makes Gold's painting utterly contemporary. The sense of aesthetic determinism at the core of Modernism presumed a forward movement away from the past. As it progressed, something soured in the modernist attitude. The exuberance of discovery hardened into a disdain for reflection, to say nothing metaphysics. Ideas were picked up and discarded without exploration in the haste to get to the next idea. Discarded but not invalidated; Modernism itself may have been the last great linear idea in western culture. Artists and other intellectuals have been adopting a much more fragmented and simultaneous view of history and culture. Gold makes use of the past, but unlike many artists working now she does so without irony (she has even suppressed her urge to make terrible puns in her titles)."

=== Ovals (as) Portraits series ===
In 1987, Gold turned to the use of the oval as a metonymical device representing the portrait. These works, while ostensibly abstract and geometric, become deeply personal conversations with the oval as a stand in for portraits in, for instance, a family tree. The ovals take on glowingly articulated personalities often expressed through colors and variations in size to develop family and conversational hierarchies. These works exist as the transitional point for Gold's conceptual standpoint, a shift toward work that directly tackles social issues through a private lens. As such, the geometrical elements of this series become direct vehicles for meaning rather than for exploration of existential formalism or intuitive painting. Stephen Westfall discussed Gold's series in relation to her earlier work and the clear progression Gold made in this series: "Over the past several years, Sharon Gold has moved on from her rigorously planar abstraction to a shimmering imagery more suggestive more suggestive of landscape and the interaction of organisms. Nevertheless, her previous work is some of the best of it is breed, and, what is more, one can trace in it the origins of her current iconography...As evocative as these paintings are, they never stray far from the no-nonsense materiality of the hardest-core post-Minimalist abstraction. Paradoxically, it is in their very materiality – in particular the undulating crests of underpainting – that one may discern the source of the extended, organic forms that Gold has pursued into the lyrically associate terrain she is exploring today."

=== Self/Portraits series ===
The Self/Portraits series pairs Gold's painterly sense for geometric abstraction with the entrance of representational painting, a step that totally shatters the previously existentialist and process-based format of Gold's work. The metonymy of the oval continues throughout this work, but it is overshadowed by Gold's direct representational painting of corporeal subjects. The body, which, in her earlier works, was signified through the action of painting, comes to the foreground of these works. The Self/Portraits become introspective specters that mirror Gold's monochromatic paintings in authority if not in form. These paintings were connected with Gold's simultaneous practice as a performer and video artist. In 1991, the paintings were displayed in a solo exhibition at the Stephen Rosenberg Gallery in New York City. They were accompanied by Gold's video work, A Video Tape 1990-1991.

=== Seeing Subjects series ===
Gold's Seeing Subjects series began in 1994 as a representational depiction of women in the past, present, and future, and they begin to invite overt feminist interpretations. In particular, Gold's use of the frame as a medium for engraved text introduces titles that directly color interpretations of her paintings. Paintings of masks and glasses become lenses or views through which Gold's works may be understood in a direct relationship with their titles: SIR.CUM.SPECT, LIP SERVICE, WOMENS VIEWS, BLIND SIGHT, EYE-SPY, SAFETY GLASS, MASKED BALLS, MASK'R AID. The works appear as a cacophony of views projected upon the mother to daughter relationship: protective, loving, obsessive, and nostalgic.

=== A Fictional Autobiography series ===
A Fictional Autobiography is Sharon Gold's 2006 work, an interactive website made in collaboration with Letha Wilson. The website is an attempt at the translation of paintings, digital prints, and photographs from the physical gallery space to the virtual landscape of the internet. Multiple overlapping narratives fill the autobiographical space with artwork depicting women in a sociological study of various relationships and interactions that subvert the traditionally superimposed roles women are often expected to abide by. The works comment on both contemporary and historical issues and are related, often humorously or ironically, to short phrases that serve as titles. These titles are presented in the timeline as monochromatic and opaque buttons that obscure Gold's artwork until the user scrolls over the top of them. In a review by Cindy Stockton Moore, the piece is described as being "a chronological context, in which artwork is linked to preceding pieces in flowchart form. Each type of work (small paintings, large paintings, silhouettes) is replaced with a corresponding color-coded symbol. Blue squares, orange circles, green diamonds become signifiers; labeled only with a title, they conceal the image until it is selected. The relationship between text, image and meaning become interchangeable - reflecting Sharon Gold’s densely layered, creative process and her continued exploration of visual semiotics." Moore goes on to explain the process of visual decoding that is embedded in Gold's extremely conceptually dense work at this stage in her career: "Signs and signifiers, codes and paradigms – sifting through the language of semiotics can be heavy work. Luckily, Gold’s exploration into decoding images uncovers levity. Antique dolls gang up to take on gendered identity in Posse; Foucault’s Panopticon is renovated in In House and transformed into a child’s plaything. In Pluperfect, a cat’s cradle of historical memory is delicately woven. The tangle of intercepting lines can simultaneously be read as a casting net, a spider web or as Fibonacci’s perfect spiral. The playful title suggests even more variations on this multitude of readings – a plurality in meaning that the artist welcomes. The intensive act of visually coding and recoding information is glorified not only in the subject of the paintings but in the way we are allowed to interact with them. Sharon Gold’s website presents ideas as hypertext – literally as words link to images and back again and figuratively as concepts build upon one another through active mental linking. These personal connections that rely on the most human of processors (the viewer) are less immediate than their technological counterparts. But, perhaps, experiencing art –even on the web- is not about immediacy. Like their timeless predecessors, the paintings in A Fictional Autobiography are cause for reflection – requiring more than a cursor’s glance."

=== Recent work ===
Gold's most recent work is her Reaction series. These portraits take on a heavily cropped and zoomed-in perspective that forces the viewer into an uncomfortable and urgent position aimed at eliciting outward emotional responses. This compositional device acts visually as though Gold is shouting through a megaphone to the public, an act of warning and protest. Gold depicts faces of laughter and agony historically located in the post-9/11 era of constant warnings and looming catastrophes, an observation on the viewer's traumatized and self-reflective location in contemporary social discourse. The paintings are created with charcoal on Belgian linen.

== Performances and video works ==
In 1994, Gold presented A Video Tape 1990-1991 as a video installation at the Syracuse University faculty exhibition at the Lowe Art Gallery. The same video was presented during Gold's 1991 solo exhibition at Stephen Rosenberg Gallery in New York City. In 1984, the premiere of the North South Consonance premiere performance took place at St. Stephens church featuring High Art composed by Martin Bresnick. Gold performed as the pianist with Robert Dick performing the piccolo. Gold performed an improvisation with composer John Zorn at the Knitting Factory in New York City. She also worked with Maureen Connor in 1978 during an art cabaret at The Ear Inn's Performance Workshop. In 1977, she presented a performance and video tapes at 112 Greene Street in New York City. In 1976, Gold's How to Play the Piano performance and video piece and Paper Piece #1 took place at the Performance Workshop. In 1975, she presented a performance and audio work at Pratt Institute titled Minimal, Post-Minimal, Conceptual Art: Running Piece. She also performed in the John Cage concert with performance and video at Pratt Institute in 1975. Together with co-director Elaine Hartnett, Sharon Gold ran the Performance and Video Workshop New York city group from 1975 through 1978. In 1967, she performed at Judson Memorial Church for the Judson Memorial Poets' Theatre. From 1965 through 1967, Gold participated in dance and music performances at Elan International Folk Theatre in New York City.

== Exhibitions ==
=== Solo exhibitions ===
- 2007 A Fictional Autobiography, online exhibition, http://www.sharongold.com/
- 2001 Robert Pardo Gallery, New York, New York
- 1991, 1989 & 1987, Stephen Rosenberg Gallery, New York, New York
- 1986 85 Mercer Street, New York, New York
- 1986 John Davis Gallery, Akron, Ohio
- 1986 Pam Adler Gallery, New York, New York
- 1984 Nina Freudenheim Gallery, Buffalo, New York
- 1984 55 Mercer Street, New York, New York
- 1982 Anderson Gallery, Virginia Commonwealth University, Richmond, Virginia
- 1981 Susan Caldwell Gallery, New York, New York
- 1981 Atholl McBean Gallery, San Francisco Art Institute, San Francisco, California
- 1981 Galerie Michael Storrer, Zurich, Switzerland
- 1978 Bertha Urdang Gallery, New York, New York
- 1977 & 1976 OK Harris Gallery, New York, New York
- 1977 112 Greene Street, New York, New York
- 1971 Judson Gallery, Judson Memorial Church, New York, New York

=== Group exhibitions ===
- 2014 Sideshow Nation II: At the Alamo, Sideshow Gallery, Brooklyn, New York
- 2014 PAPERAZZI 3, Janet Kurnatowski Gallery, Brooklyn, New York
- 2012, 2011, 2010, 2009, 1994 Faculty Exhibition, XL Projects, Syracuse University, Syracuse, New York
- 2009 Drawing the Other: Works on Paper by SU and SUF Faculty (50th Anniversary Exhibition), Syracuse University, Florence, Italy
- 2007 Dangerous Women Two, The Gallery, Mercer County Community College, West Windsor, New Jersey
- 2005 ARTEFACT Galleria Pardo, Zurich, Switzerland
- 2005 To Never Forget: Faces of the Fallen, The Wall, Shaffer Art Building, Syracuse University, Syracuse, New York
- 2005, 2004, 2002, 1999, 1996 Faculty Exhibition, Lowe Art Gallery, Syracuse University, Syracuse, New York
- 2004 ARTEFACT Galleria Pardo, New York, New York
- 2004 Subject to Oneself A Group Exhibition of Self-Portraiture, PLAySPACE, California
- 2004 California College of the Arts, San Francisco, CA
- 2004 ARTEFACT Galleria Pardo, Milan, Italy
- 2004 First Annual Downtown Art Auction Benefit, Michael Perez Gallery, NY, NY
- 2000 Women, Art and Change 2000, Spark Gallery, Syracuse, NY
- 1999 No Limits, Judson Memorial Church, New York
- 1999 Edith Barrett Art Gallery, Utica College of Syracuse University, Utica, NY
- 1998 A Live and Silent Auction of Miniature Art Works, Prime Time House Benefit, Torrington, Connecticut
- 1998 Artists Choose Artists, The Century Association, New York, NY
- 1998 Studio Arts: The Creative Process, Lowe Art Gallery, Syracuse University, Syracuse, NY
- 1994 Group Exhibition, Dietrich Contemporary Art, NY
- 1993 Inaugural Exhibition, Lowe Art Gallery, Syracuse University, Syracuse, NY
- 1993 Ticket=Art, Organization for Independent Artists Benefit, Brooke Alexander Gallery, New York, October 11, 1993
- 1993 Studio Tour, Art In General, New York Benefit, October 16, 1993
- 1992 Group Exhibition/Benefit, IRIS HOUSE: A Center for Women Living with HIV, NY, Women’s Foundation and Manhattan Borough President's Office
- 1991 New Acquisitions, Everson Museum of Art, Syracuse, New York
- 1991 Inaugural Exhibition, ARTSTAR, Los Angeles, CA
- 1991 Paper Trail, Stephen Rosenberg Gallery, NY, NY
- 1990 The Image of Abstract Painting in the 80's, Rose Art Museum, Brandeis University, Waltham, Massachusetts, curated by Susan Stoops
- 1990 New Work, Stephen Rosenberg Gallery, NY, NY
- 1989 Painting Beyond The Death Of Painting, Kuznetsky Most Exhibition Hall, Moscow, USSR, curated by Donald Kuspit
- 1989 One Of A Kind: Unique Works On Paper, GH Dalsheimer Gallery, Baltimore, MD
- 1989 Space, Scale & Structure, Ben Shahn Gallery, William Patterson College, Wayne, NJ
- 1988 Abstraction: The Central Image, four-person exhibition, Stephen Rosenberg Gallery, NY
- 1988 Summer Show, GH Dalsheimer Gallery, Baltimore, MD
- 1988, 1987, 1984 Faculty Exhibition, The Joe and Emily Lowe Art Gallery, Syracuse University, Syracuse, NY
- 1987 Six Younger Underknowns, Dia Art Foundation, Bridgehampton, NY, curated by Henry Geldzahler
- 1986 Rose Art Museum 25th Anniversary Show, Rose Art Museum, Brandeis University, Waltham, Massachusetts
- 1986 Tribeca Alert! Tribeca Benefit Art Auction, Hal Bromm Gallery, NY, NY
- 1986 Sixth Invitational, John Davis Gallery, Akron, Ohio
- 1986 Line Drives, Gallery 53/Smithy Artworks, Cooperstown, NY
- 1986 Abstraction/Abstraction, Carnegie Mellon University Art Gallery, Pittsburgh PA, curated by Elaine A. King, traveling to Paul Klein Gallery, Chicago, Ill.
- 1986 New Abstract Paintings, Cork Gallery, Lincoln Center, New York, curated by D. Fortenberry
- 1986 Joseph Masheck Collection of Contemporary Art, Rose Art Museum, Brandeis University, Waltham, Massachusetts
- 1985 Earsight: Sound and Image in the Contemporary Arts, Nexus Gallery, Philadelphia, Pa. curated by Peter Frank, traveling to Southern Alleghenies Museum of Art, Johnston Extension, Pa.
- 1985 The Fifth Annual, John Davis Gallery, Akron, Ohio
- 1985 Ten Gallery Artists, Nina Freudenheim Gallery, Buffalo, NY
- 1985 Group Exhibition Invitational, Pam Adler Gallery, NY, NY
- 1985 Umpires of Art, Gallery/53 Smithy Artworks, Cooperstown, NY
- 1985 A Decade of Visual Arts at Princeton: Faculty 1975-1985, The Art Museum, Princeton University, Princeton, NJ
- 1985 The Non-Objective World-1985, Kamikaze, NY, NY, curated by Stephen Westfall
- 1985 Group Exhibition, Akron Art Museum, Akron, Ohio
- 1985 Painting 1985, Pam Adler Gallery, NY, NY
- 1984 Small Works: New Abstract Painting, Lafayette College and Muhlenberg College, Easton and Allentown, Pa., curated by Ron Janowich and Thomas Hudspeth
- 1984 The Fourth Annual, John Davis Gallery, Akron, OH
- 1984 Bases Loaded, Gallery 53/Smithy Artworks, Cooperstown, NY
- 1984 First Underground Show, 456 Broome Street, NY, NY curated by Thornton Willis
- 1984 Drawings: New Dimensions, Nina Freudenheim Gallery, Buffalo, NY
- 1983 Multiples, Jack Tilton Gallery, NY, NY
- 1983 Visiting Artist and Faculty Show, Tyler School of Art, Temple University, Philadelphia, PA
- 1983 Contemporary Abstract Painting, Center for the Arts, Muhlenberg College, Allentown, Pa., curated by Thomas Hudspeth
- 1983 Art of the Rapid Transit, Niagara Frontier Transportation Authority, Buffalo, NY
- 1983 New York Painting Today, Three Rivers Arts Festival, Pittsburgh, Pa., curated by Elaine A. King and Donald Kuspit
- 1982 Critical Perspectives, MoMA PS1, Institute for Art and Urban Resources, Long Island City, NY, curated by Joseph Masheck
- 1982 Fifteen Artists, Pam Adler Gallery, NY, NY curated by Pam Adler and Jack Tilton
- 1981 Drawing Invitational, Harm Bouchaert Gallery, NY, NY
- 1981 Works on Paper, Museum of Modern Art, Art Lending Service, NY, NY
- 1981 Group Exhibition, McNay Art Institute, San Antonio, TX
- 1981 Donne in Arte-Viaggio a New York, Galleria Arco d'Alibert, Rome Italy, traveling to Palazzo Ducale, Genoa, Italy
- 1980 US Art '80, Ericson Gallery, NY, NY, curated by Vered Lieb
- 1979 Small Is Beautiful, Freedman Gallery, Albright College, Reading, Pa., traveling to Center Gallery, Bucknell University, Lewisburg, Pa., curated by Marilyn Zeitlin
- 1979 Group Exhibition, Susan Caldwell Gallery, NY, NY
- 1978 Group Exhibition, 112 Greene Street, NY, NY
- 1978 Group Exhibition, Bertha Urdang Gallery, NY, NY
- 1978 Group Exhibition, Kilcawley Center, Youngstown State University, Youngstown, OH
- 1977 Drawings and Prints-New York, Rush Rhees Gallery, University of Rochester, NY

== Collections and public commissions ==
Gold's works are in the collections of the Everson Museum of Art, Syracuse, New York; Chemical Bank, New York, New York; Rose Art Museum at Brandeis University, Waltham, Massachusetts; Southeast Banking Corporation, Miami, Florida; Best Products, Richmond, Virginia; Chase Manhattan Bank, New York, New York; Springfield Museum of Art, Springfield, Ohio; McCrory Stores, New York, New York; Norsearch Industries, New York, New York; Prudential Insurance Company of America, Newark, New Jersey; Fox, Glynn & Melamed, New York, New York; and Hughes, Hubbard & Reed, Inc., New York, New York. In 1988, Gold was commissioned to make a public painting for the Niagara Frontier Transportation Authority at the Humboldt-Hospital Station east entrance in Buffalo, New York.

== Recognition ==
Sharon Gold received grants or fellowship at the MacDowell Colony in 1972, Pratt Institute in 1974, National Endowment for the Arts for painting in 1981, and the Penny McCall Foundation for painting in 1988.

== Academic career ==
=== Early positions and visiting faculty ===
Sharon Gold worked as a faculty member at Princeton University. She was also a visiting artist faculty member at Pratt Institute, Virginia Commonwealth University, University of Texas at San Antonio, San Francisco Art Institute, and the Tyler School of Art.

=== Syracuse University ===
Sharon Gold has been a member of the Syracuse University faculty since 1986. She is an associate professor of painting and has influenced hundreds of artists during her academic career, including William Powhida, Paul Weiner, and Letha Wilson. At Syracuse, she has developed courses in critical studies including Decoding Images of Representation and Professional Practices in Visual Arts. Gold's Decoding Images of Representation course covers a wide range of writings concerning critical theory and modes of thinking that apply to the production of imagery. The course is a forum for Gold's discussion-based pedagogical mode through which her students apply the concepts they have read about to their own artwork and that of their peers in contextualized critiques. Decoding Images of Representation extends from the world of visual culture into sociopolitical affairs and power studies related to gender, race, and contemporary issues. Gold also teaches a diverse range of painting classes.

== Professional affiliations ==
In 2003, Sharon Gold became a member of the American Association of Museums in Washington, DC. She participated in the 2002, 1998, and 1996 Feminist Art and Art History Conferences at Barnard College, Columbia University. In 1998, she presented her paper, Constructing Narratives: Evolving Subjects and Content as Sits for Seeing and Spectatorship. Gold was a panelist on Race/Image/Gender at Syracuse University for Celebrate Difference week in 1990 and served as the panel chair on Abstract Pictures/Abstract Paintings for the College Art Association Conference that same year. In 1989, she was the committee chair for the distinguished artist award for lifetime achievement through the College Art Association in San Francisco. In 1988, she was a committee member and presenter for the distinguished artist award for lifetime achievement through the College art Association in Houston, Texas and a panelist at The Sameness of Difference: The Contemporary Dilemma in Art at the Everson Museum in Syracuse, New York. Gold was a member of the Lower Manhattan Loft Tenants Association from 1980 through 1983. She also served as the director of the visual arts program at the New York City Department of Cultural Affairs from 1977 to 1981. Gold became a member of the College Art Association in 1977 and a New York Artists Equity member in 1973. She was a member of the Organization of independent artists from 1970 to 1980.

== Critical responses ==
In a 1979 review of Gold's work, Donald Kuspit explains the conceptual relationship between painting and sculpture that comes out through Gold's work: "Gold's differentiation of the phenomenal field of the paint by a cruciform--the form becomes a means by which the field decisively announces its power of individuation--introduces a profound relief into the paintings, and also heralds their critical relation to sculpture. Indeed, when I first saw them I thought of them as impacted reliefs, because they were sufficiently raised from the wall to function as reliefs yet not sufficiently removed from it to become theatrical, or even illustrative of the wall. The model of differentiated form emerging from undifferentiated flux--simply of a frame emerging from the unframed--which the relief offers, seems to me a more primordial image of sculpture than Pincus-Witten's vertical/horizontal, figure/earth crossing. The crossing can be displayed only after the primary relief has been established: it becomes the differentiation of the freshly undifferentiated surface the frame contains. In any case, this critical relation to sculpture--reinforced by the fact that Gold's canvas is backed by "wall-like plywood panels" (another touch of felt invisibility, of subliminally articulate negative presence)--adds a fresh element of conceptual tension to the perceptual tensions already noted. Both perceptual and conceptual tension are registered in the fact that the crossings of the cruciform—or rather, in some cases, the implied crossings—are handled in such a way that they become a kind of relief sculpture."
