= Kira Nam Greene =

Korean American painter

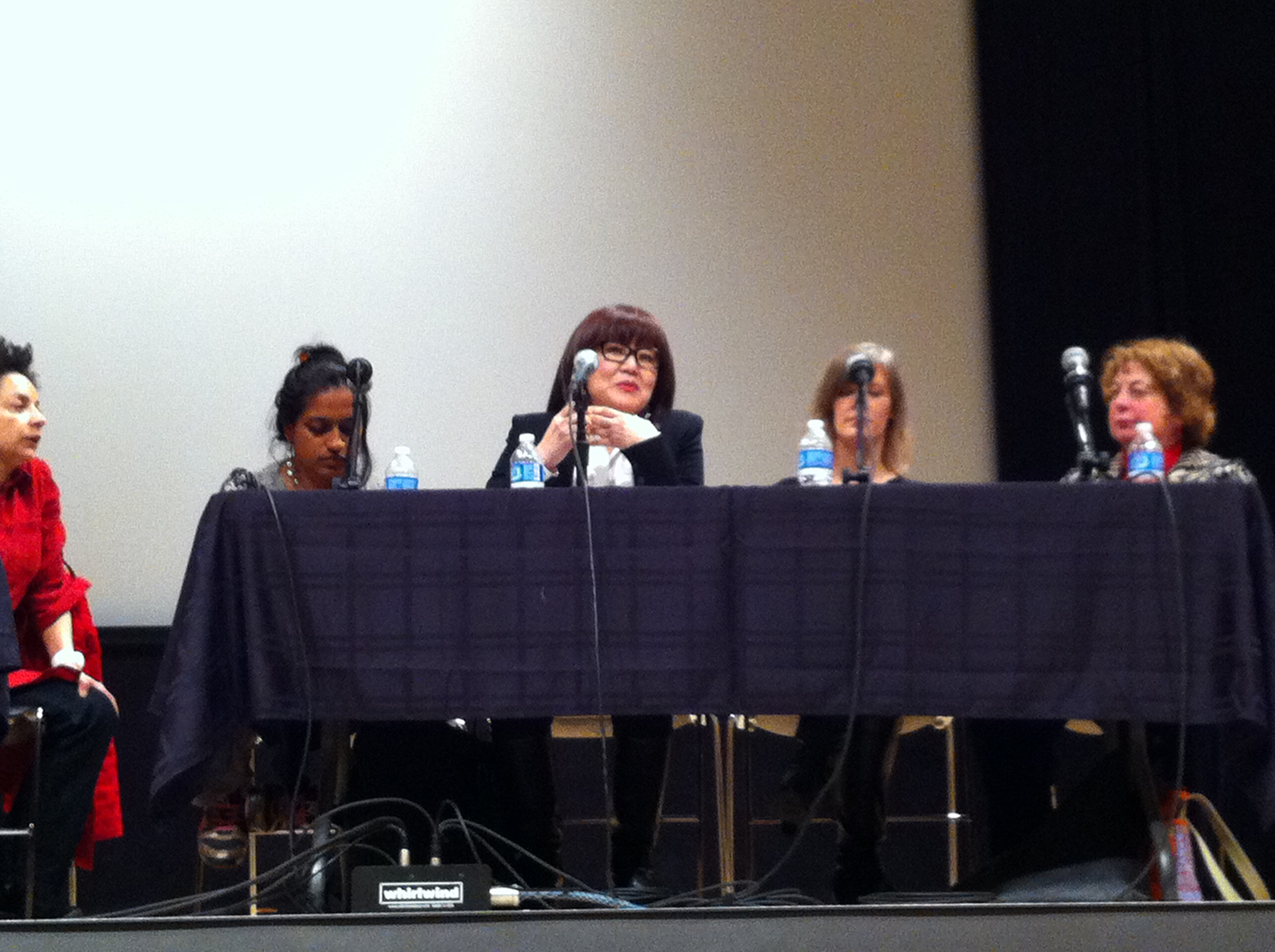
- From left to right - curator Yasmin Ramirez, artist Chitra Ganesh, artist Kira Nam Greene, curator Julie Lohnes, feminist scholar Ferris Olin at the Panel Discussion "Transnationalism and Women Artists in Diaspora” at the Brooklyn Museum - March 31, 2012
- Born: Seoul, Korea
- Education: School of Visual Arts, MFA, 2004; San Francisco Art Institute, BFA, 2000; Stanford University, PhD in Political Science, 1996; Seoul National University, BA in International Relations, 1988
- Style: Feminist, Transnationalism, Pattern and Decoration

Kira Nam Greene is a New York-based painter known for combining ethnographic imagery, meticulous realism, and layered patterns. Greene has expressed her commitment to painting as a way to explore feminism, materialism, and beauty.

== Biography ==
Greene was born in Seoul, Korea and lives and works in Brooklyn, New York. She received a BFA from San Francisco Art Institute and an MFA from the School of Visual Arts. Prior to becoming an artist, Greene earned her PhD in Political Science from Stanford University and a degree in International Relations from Seoul National University.

== Career ==
Greene has exhibited at Sheldon Museum of Art, Muskegon Museum of Art, Brown University, Salisbury University, Wave Hill, Bronx Museum of Art, Noyes Museum, A.I.R. Gallery, Accola Griefen Gallery, Lodge Gallery, Kiechel Fine Art and Jane Lombard Gallery. She has also been a visiting artist and lectured at the Brooklyn Museum, Maryland Institute College of Art, Union College, Salisbury University, SFAI, School of Visual Arts, and Rutgers University. She teaches in the MFA and BFA programs at Parsons (The New School). where in 2018 she was the MICA Geneviève McMillan/Reba Stewart Endowed Chair in painting. Also in 2018, she was a semi-finalist for the Outwin Boochever painting prize and a Bennet Prize finalist for women working in figurative painting. In October 2021, Greene was a finalist for the Smithsonian’s National Portrait Gallery Outwin Boochever painting prize, whose winners were due to be announced on April 29, 2022.

== Work ==
Greene's work primarily focuses on the feminist exploration of painting via a combination of abstract patterns and representational forms. This strategy seeks to "defamiliarize natural space and invite extended, sensual encounters with the paintings, where diverse representational modes coexist, and where the body appears as if seen for the first time." Instead of human figures, her earlier work used still lifes, especially food items, as allegorical stand-ins for the female body. Art writer and curator Emily Colucci commented about Greene's use of food and bodily imagery, "Greene's painting not only provided a twist on Trump's notorious pussy-grabbing comment, but it also hinted at the papaya's vaginal qualities. The painting, particularly in the context of its title, humorously references the long legacy in feminist art of using food as a stand-in for the body as seen in works like Marilyn Minter's 100 Food Porn paintings." Spurred by recent developments in the politics in America, Greene paints women in creative fields, posed to echo historical figurative paintings. Interviewing them and researching their working lives generates ways to render pictorially—through allusions, icons, objects, patterns, and symbols—the rich personhood of the subjects. Jorge Daniel Veneciano, former Director of the Sheldon Museum of Art, commenting on the vibrancy of the still-life genre in the era of transnationalism and globalism, states, "Greene's recent painting provides an arch interpretation of the still-life genre and the promises it makes. The pun in the title, Archway to Happiness, may or may not be her intention, but it supports a reading of the work as satirically commenting on the very rhetoric of the genre. It also foregrounds the transnational nature of still lifes, carrying allusions to Celtic, Moorish, and pan-Asian cultures."

== Influences ==
Greene has expressed how the Pattern and Decoration movement of the 1970s and '80s had a large influence on her work. Her adoption of decorative patterns as the political statement of the marginalized also informs the status of her subjects. Greene states that her political science training informs the deep research into her paintings' subjects. Greene has studied under Brett Reichman at SFAI and Jake Berthot at SVA, both of whom she cites as having influenced her approach to painting.
