= Margo Leavin =

American art dealer (1936–2021)

- Born: April 18, 1936
- Died: October 14, 2021 (aged 85)
- Education: University of California, Los Angeles
- Known for: Art dealer, gallery owner

Margo Leavin (1936–2021) was an American art dealer. She was born in New York, but spent her career in Los Angeles. In 1970, she opened the Margo Leavin Gallery in West Hollywood, CA, which she operated until it closed in 2013.

== Career and reputation ==
Leavin was known for her wit, her relationships with her artists, and business savvy. The longevity of her career is a testament to these attributes. The Gallery closed in 2013 but it promoted itself as specializing in contemporary photography, sculpture, paintings and drawings.

Artist and art dealer Nicholas Wilder is quoted as saying about Leavin and her gallery, "She works very hard and it's run as a business. It's not a thing that's there for some lifestyle change or for a tax write-off or something. She's a very good dealer."

== Margo Leavin Gallery ==
The Margo Leavin Gallery was a contemporary art gallery in Los Angeles, California, United States. The gallery was opened in 1970 by Leavin at what was then the studio of designer Tony Duquette. Leavin later expanded to adjacent buildings along the block, including a former post office, which served as an exhibition space. Wendy Brandow, who joined in 1976, became a partner in 1989.

While the gallery began with exhibitions of mostly editioned work, it grew to become renowned for its program of modern and contemporary art and its work with a wide variety of artists from emerging to established ones.

The gallery closed in 2013, after producing over 400 solo exhibitions. In 2015, it was announced that the Getty Research Institute would acquire the complete archives of the Margo Leavin Gallery. The gallery property was sold in May 2016 to movie producer Megan Ellison, daughter of billionaire Larry Ellison, for $40 million.

In June 2016, Leavin made a $20 million donation to the UCLA School of the Arts and Architecture to rebuild and expand its aging graduate art studio facilities in Culver City; the complex was renamed the UCLA Margo Leavin Graduate Art Studios.

=== Exhibitions ===
The following is a partial list:

- Billy Al Bengston
- Joe Goode
- Ed Moses
- John Chamberlain
- Dan Flavin
- Ellsworth Kelly
- Lynda Benglis
- Agnes Martin
- Hannah Wilke
- David Hockney
- Sol LeWitt
- Charles Gaines
- Haim Steinbach
- Albert Oehlen
- Rudolf Stingel
- Mel Kendrick
- Sherrie Levine
- Larry Johnson
- Tony Oursler
- Dan Graham
- Alexis Smith
- John Baldessari
- Sarah Charlesworth
- Roni Horn
- Joseph Kosuth
- William Leavitt
- Stephen Prina
- Allen Ruppersberg
- Gary Simmons
- Jeffrey Vallance
- Christopher Williams
