= Tricia Collins =

American art historian

Tricia Collins is an American art critic, art gallerist and curator of contemporary art. She was half of the curatorial team Collins & Milazzo, with Richard Milazzo, who together co-published and co-edited Effects : Magazine for New Art Theory from 1982 to 1984. She later ran the art galleries Grand Salon, Tricia Collins Grand Salon, and Tricia Collins Contemporary Art in New York City until the year 2000.

== Biography ==
Born in Miami, Collins grew up in Tallahassee, Florida and moved to New York City in 1979. In 1980 she moved to the East Village.

== Collins & Milazzo ==
In 1984, Tricia Collins and Richard Milazzo began working together as curators to transform the group show into a critical statement. Her exhibitions and critical writings with Collins & Milazzo brought to prominence a new generation of artists in the 1980s. It was their exhibitions and writings that originally fashioned the theoretical context for a new kind of Post-conceptual art that argued simultaneously against Neo-Expressionism and Picture-Theory Art.

- 1. Civilization and the Landscape of Discontent. Curated by Collins & Milazzo, Gallery Nature Morte, New York, March 1984. Text by Tricia Collins and Richard Milazzo. Artists: Stephen Aljian, Ross Bleckner, Stephan Gantenbein, Mark Innerst, Peter Nadin, Louis Renzoni, Susan Beschta-Springfield, James Welling, Michael Zwack.
- 2. Still Life With Transaction: Former Objects, New Moral Arrangements, and the History of Surfaces. Curated by Collins & Milazzo, International With Monument Gallery, New York, March 28 - April 21, 1984. Text by Tricia Collins and Richard Milazzo. Artists: Alice Albert, Ericka Beckman, Alan Belcher, Ross Bleckner, Barry Bridgwood, Sarah Charlesworth, Wendy Galavitz, Judy Geib, Jim Jacobs, Stephen Lack, Kevin Larmon, Andrew Masullo, Peter McCaffrey, Jan Mohlman, Peter Nadin, Peter Nagy, Joel Otterson, Richard Prince, Steven Parrino, Tyler Turkle, Laurie Simmons.
- 3. Natural Genre: From the Neutral Subject to the Hypothesis of World Objects. Curated by Collins & Milazzo, Florida State University Gallery & Museum, Tall., Fla., Aug. 31-Sept. 30, 1984. Color catalogue with text by Tricia Collins and Richard Milazzo. Artists: Jane Bauman, Ericka Beckman, Alan Belcher, Gretchen Bender, Ross Bleckner, Tom Brazleton, Barry Bridgwood, Sarah Charlesworth, Carroll Dunham, Robert Garratt, Mark Innerst, Kevin Larmon, Louise Lawler, Allan McCollum, Peter Nadin, Peter Nagy, Joseph Nechvatal, Steven Parrino, Louis Renzoni, Meyer Vaisman, Oliver Wasow, James Welling, David Wojnarowicz, Michael Zwack.
- 4. Still Life With Transaction II: Former Objects, New Moral Arrangements, and the History of Surfaces. Curated by Collins & Milazzo, Galerie Jurka, Amsterdam, November 1984. Text by Tricia Collins and Richard Milazzo. Artists: Alice Albert, Ericka Beckman, Alan Belcher, Ross Bleckner, Barry Bridgwood, Sarah Charlesworth, Wendy Galavitz, Judy Geib, Jim Jacobs, Stephen Lack, Kevin Larmon, Peter McCaffrey, Peter Nadin, Peter Nagy, Joel Otterson, Richard Prince, Laurie Simmons, Tyler Turkle, Meyer Vaisman, Oliver Wasow.
- 5. The New Capital. Curated by Collins & Milazzo, White Columns, New York, December 4, 1984 - January 5, 1985. Text by Tricia Collins & Richard Milazzo. Artists: Vikky Alexander, Jane Bauman, Alan Belcher, Gretchen Bender, Barry Bridgwood, Sarah Charlesworth, Peter Halley, Jeff Koons, Daniel Levine, Frank Majore, Peter Nagy, Joseph Nechvatal, David Robbins, Tyler Turkle, Meyer Vaisman, Oliver Wasow.
- 6. Final Love. Curated by Collins & Milazzo, C.A.S.H./Newhouse Gallery, New York, March 15 - April 14, 1985. Text by Tricia Collins and Richard Milazzo. Artists: Ross Bleckner, Peter Halley, Kevin Larmon, Jonathan Lasker, Allan McCollum, Olivier Mosset, Peter Nadin, Bonnie Nielson, Meyer Vaisman, Wallace & Donohue, James Welling, Stephen Westfall.
- 7. Paravision. Curated by Collins & Milazzo, Postmasters Gallery, New York, May 3 - June 2, 1985. Text by Tricia Collins and Richard Milazzo. Artists: Jane Bauman, Alan Belcher, Gretchen Bender, Ross Bleckner, Barry Bridgwood, Peter Halley, Jeff Koons, Jonathan Lasker, Robert Longo, Richard Milani, Olivier Mosset, Ricardo Regazzoni, David Robbins, Gary Stephan, Philip Taaffe, Meyer Vaisman, Wallace & Donohue
- 8. Persona Non Grata. Curated by Collins & Milazzo, Daniel Newburg Gallery, New York, September 11 - October 5, 1985. Text by Tricia Collins and Richard Milazzo. Artists: Vikky Alexander, Ellen Carey, Stephen Lack, Vera Lehndorff & Holger Trülzsch, Allan McCollum & Laurie Simmons, Richard Milani, Peter Nadin, Richard Prince, David Robbins, Walter Robinson, Brigitta Rohrbach, Julie Wachtel, Michael Zwack.
- 9. Cult and Decorum. Curated by Collins & Milazzo, Tibor De Nagy Gallery, New York, December 7, 1985 - January 4, 1986. Text by Tricia Collins and Richard Milazzo. Artists: Ross Bleckner, Sarah Charlesworth, David Diao, Peter Halley, Jeff Koons, Kevin Larmon, Jonathan Lasker, Peter Nadin, Joel Otterson, Ricardo Regazzoni, Robin Rose, Laurie Simmons, Haim Steinbach, Gary Stephan, Philip Taaffe, Meyer Vaisman, Not Vital.
- 10. Time After Time (A Sculpture Show). Curated by Collins & Milazzo, Diane Brown Gallery, New York, March 8 - April 2, 1986. Text by Tricia Collins and Richard Milazzo. Artists: Edward Allington, Gretchen Bender, Don Bonham, Barry Bridgwood, Saint Clair Cemin, Maureen Connor, Joel Fisher, Kenji Fujita, James Hill, Richard Jarden, Jeff Koons, Annette Lemieux, Erik Levine, Allan McCollum, Joseph Nechvatal, John Newman, Alastair Noble, Joel Otterson, Ricardo Regazzoni, Haim Steinbach, Gary Stephan, Not Vital, Michael Zwack.
- 11. Spiritual America. Curated by Collins & Milazzo, CEPA, Buffalo, May 3 - June 15, 1986. Catalogue with text by Tricia Collins and Richard Milazzo. Artists: Jane Bauman, Gretchen Bender, Barry Bridgwood, Calvin Brown, David Cabrera, Sarah Charlesworth, Peter Coates & Nancy Dwyer, Michael Corris, Dorit Cypis, David Diao, Lea Douglas, Sarah Drury, Daniel Faust, Diana Formasano, Peter Halley, James Hill, Peter Hopkins, Sara Hornbacher, Mark Innerst, Jeff Koons, Liz Koury, Annette Lemieux, Allan McCollum, Steve Miller, Robert Morgan, Peter Nagy, Joseph Nechvatal, Bonnie Nielson, Anna Oberto, David Reisman, Jim Rodgers, Kay Rosen, Tad Savinar, John Schlessinger, Tyler Turkle, Wallace & Donohue, Robin Weglinski.
- 12. Paravision II. Curated by Collins & Milazzo, Margo Leavin Gallery, Los Angeles, July 12 - August 23, 1986. Text by Tricia Collins and Richard Milazzo. Artists: Gretchen Bender, Ross Bleckner, Barry Bridgwood, Calvin Brown, Sarah Charlesworth, Charles Clough, David Diao, Carroll Dunham, Peter Halley, Peter Hopkins, Barbara Kruger, Jonathan Lasker, Robert Longo, Richard Milani, Olivier Mosset, Peter Nagy, Joel Otterson, Walter Robinson, Brigitta Rohrbach, Haim Steinbach, Gary Stephan, Philip Taaffe, Meyer Vaisman, Wallace & Donohue, James Welling.
- 13. Ultrasurd. Curated by Collins & Milazzo, S.L. Simpson Gallery, Toronto, September 1986. Catalogue with text by Tricia Collins and Richard Milazzo. Artists: Saint Clair Cemin, Sarah Charlesworth, Abraham David Christian, Charles Clough, David Diao, Barbara Ess, Joel Fisher, Peter Hopkins, Suzanne Joelson, Annette Lemieux, Olivier Mosset, Allan McCollum, Peter Nagy, Lucio Pozzi, Walter Robinson, Robin Rose, Tyler Turkle, Julie Wachtel, Oliver Wasow.
- 14. Modern Sleep. Curated by Collins & Milazzo, American Fine Arts Co., New York, October 17 - November 16, 1986. Brochure with text by Tricia Collins and Richard Milazzo. Artists: Saint Clair Cemin, John Dogg, Tishan Hsu, Kevin Larmon, Jonathan Lasker, Annette Lemieux, Olivier Mosset, Joel Otterson, Jeffrey Plate.
- 15. The Antique Future. Curated by Collins & Milazzo, Massimo Audiello Gallery, New York, February 13 - March 15, 1987. Brochure with text by Tricia Collins and Richard Milazzo. Artists: Edward Allington, Ross Bleckner, Saint Clair Cemin, Abraham David Christian, Tishan Hsu, Annette Lemieux, Lucio Pozzi, Sal Scarpitta, Mike and Doug Starn, Gary Stephan, Not Vital.
- 16. Extreme Order. Curated by Collins & Milazzo, Lia Rumma Gallery, Naples, May - July 1987. Brochure with text by Tricia Collins and Richard Milazzo. Artists: Saint Clair Cemin, Robert Gober, Peter Halley, Annette Lemieux, Haim Steinbach.
- 17. The Ironic Sublime. Curated by Collins & Milazzo, Galerie Albrecht, Munich, June 4 - July 18, 1987. Catalogue with text by Tricia Collins and Richard Milazzo. Artists: Ross Bleckner, Saint Clair Cemin, Abraham David Christian, Suzan Etkin, Joel Fisher, Tishan Hsu, Allan McCollum, Gary Stephan, Joel Otterson, James Welling.
- 18. The New Poverty. Curated by Collins & Milazzo. Catalogue with text by Tricia Collins and Richard Milazzo, John Gibson Gallery, New York, October 10 - November 7, 1987. Artists: Ford Beckman, David Cabrera, Saint Clair Cemin, Abraham David Christian, John Dogg, Suzan Etkin, Peter Fend, Joel Fisher, Ronald Jones, Ange Leccia, Joel Otterson, Lucio Pozzi, Holt Quentel, Sal Scarpitta, Not Vital, Meg Webster, Michael Zwack.
- 19. Media Post Media. Curated by Collins & Milazzo, Scott Hanson Gallery, New York, January 6 - February 9, 1988. Color catalogue with text by Tricia Collins and Richard Milazzo. Artists: Vikky Alexander, Gretchen Bender, Sarah Charlesworth, Colette, Nancy Dwyer, Barbara Ess, Suzan Etkin, Jenny Holzer, Barbara Kruger, Annette Lemieux, Sherrie Levine, Holt Quentel, Nancy Shaver, Cindy Sherman, Laurie Simmons, Karen Sylvester, Rosemarie Trockel, Julie Wachtel, Meg Webster.
- 20. A Deer Manger, A Dress Pattern, Farthest Sea Water, and a Signature. Curated by Collins & Milazzo, 303 Gallery, New York, February 18 - March 13, 1988. Brochure with text by Tricia Collins and Richard Milazzo. Artists: David Carrino, Suzan Etkin, Sal Scarpitta, Meg Webster
- 21. Off White. Curated by Collins & Milazzo, Diane Brown Gallery, New York, May 24 - June 18, 1988. Brochure with text by Tricia Collins and Richard Milazzo. Artists: Ford Beckman, David Carrino, Lawrence Carroll, Saint Clair Cemin, Abraham David Christian, Suzan Etkin, Andrew Lord, Holt Quentel, Sal Scarpitta, Not Vital
- 22. Art at the End of the Social. Curated by Collins & Milazzo, The Rooseum, Malmö, Sweden, July - October 1988. Color catalogue with text by Tricia Collins and Richard Milazzo. Artists: Donald Baechler, Ford Beckman, Gretchen Bender, Ross Bleckner, David Carrino, Lawrence Carroll, Saint Clair Cemin, Sarah Charlesworth, Charles Clough, David Diao, John Dogg, Suzan Etkin, Peter Fend, Robert Gober, Peter Halley, Claudia Hart, Tishan Hsu, Jon Kessler, Jeff Koons, Kevin Larmon, Jonathan Lasker, Annette Lemieux, Allan McCollum, Peter Nadin, Peter Nagy, Joseph Nechvatal, Joel Otterson, Richard Prince, Holt Quentel, Sal Scarpitta, Nancy Shaver, Haim Steinbach, Gary Stephan, Philip Taaffe, Tyler Turkle, Meg Webster, James Welling
- 23. Hybrid Neutral: Modes of Abstraction and the Social. Curated by Collins & Milazzo, I.C.I. Exhibition: University Art Gallery, The University of North Texas, Denton, Texas, August 29 - September 30, 1988; J.B. Speed Art Museum, Louisville, Kentucky, November 7, 1988 - January 2, 1989; Alberta College Gallery of Art, Calgary, Alberta, Canada, February 9 - March 9, 1989; The Contemporary Arts Center, Cincinnati, Ohio, March 31 - May 6, 1989; Richard F. Brush Art Gallery, St. Lawrence University, Canton, New York, October 12 - November 15, 1989; Santa Fe Community College Art Gallery & Museum, Gainesville, Florida, February 4 - March 18, 1990; Mendel Art Gallery & Museum, Saskatoon, Saskatchewan, Canada, July 1990. Catalogue with texts by Tricia Collins and Richard Milazzo, and Gary Indiana. Artists: Vikky Alexander, John Armleder, Gretchen Bender, Ross Bleckner, Saint Clair Cemin, Sarah Charlesworth, David Diao, Robert Gober, Peter Halley, Tishan Hsu, Jeff Koons, Jonathan Lasker, Annette Lemieux, Allan McCollum, Peter Nagy, Joel Otterson, Haim Steinbach, Gary Stephan, Philip Taaffe, Meyer Vaisman, James Welling
- 24. Primary Forms, Mediated Structures. Curated by Collins & Milazzo, Massimo Audiello Gallery, New York, September - October 1988. Catalogue with text by Tricia Collins and Richard Milazzo. Artists: Saint Clair Cemin, Joel Fisher, Jon Kessler, Joel Otterson.
- 25. The New Poverty II. Curated by Collins & Milazzo, Meyers/Bloom Gallery, Santa Monica, California, December 3, 1988 - January 8, 1989. Brochure with text by Tricia Collins and Richard Milazzo. Artists: Ford Beckham, Eberhard Bosslet, Lawrence Carroll, David Carrino, Saint Clair Cemin, Abraham David Christian, Suzan Etkin, Peter Fend, Gloria Friedmann, Erik Levine, Andrew Lord, Vik Muniz, Holt Quentel, Sal Scarpitta, Nancy Shaver, Not Vital, Meg Webster, Michael Zwack.
- 26. Pre-Pop Post-Appropriation. Curated by Collins & Milazzo, Stux Gallery]], in cooperation with Leo Castelli, New York, February 3 - March 4, 1989. Catalogue with text by Tricia Collins and Richard Milazzo. Artists: Doug Anderson, Ross Bleckner, Lawrence Carroll, David Carrino, Suzan Etkin, Robert Gober, Jasper Johns, Annette Lemieux, Holt Quentel, Robert Rauschenberg, Sal Scarpitta, Nancy Shaver, Mike and Doug Starn, Meg Webster.
- 27. Buena Vista. Curated by Collins & Milazzo, John Gibson Gallery, New York, October 14 - November 11, 1989. Catalogue with text by Tricia Collins and Richard Milazzo. Artists: William Anastasi, Ford Beckman, Bernd and Hilla Becher, Sophie Calle, Suzan Etkin, Peter Halley, Peter Hopkins, Allan McCollum, Vik Muniz, Wolfgang Robbe, Sal Scarpitta, Nancy Shaver, Tyler Turkle, Meg Webster.
- 28. The Last Laugh: Irony, Humor, Self-Mockery and Derision. Curated by Collins & Milazzo, Massimo Audiello Gallery, New York, January 6 - February 17, 1990. Text by Tricia Collins and Richard Milazzo. Artists: Donald Baechler, John Baldessari, Saint Clair Cemin, Billy Copley, Deborah Kass, Jeff Koons, Cary Leibowitz, Roy Lichtenstein, Vik Muniz, Richard Prince, Ad Reinhardt, Allen Ruppersberg, Tyler Turkle, Julie Wachtel, Andy Warhol.
- 29. A Curatorial Project: Ford Beckham (One-Person Exhibition) and Meg Webster (Projects Room). Curated by Collins & Milazzo, Scott Hanson Gallery, New York, January 1990. Catalogues with texts by Tricia Collins and Richard Milazzo.
- 30. A Curatorial Project: Sal Scarpitta (One-Person Exhibition), Robert Rauschenberg (Projects Room) and Change Inc. Benefit. Curated by Collins & Milazzo, Scott Hanson Gallery, New York, February 1990. Catalogues with texts by Tricia Collins and Richard Milazzo.
- 31. A Curatorial Project: Token Gestures (A Painting Show) and Charles Clough (Projects Room). Curated by Collins & Milazzo, Scott Hanson Gallery, New York, March 1990. Catalogues with texts by Tricia Collins and Richard Milazzo. Artists: Ross Bleckner, Charles Clough, Stephen Ellis, Nicholas Howey, Richard Kalina, Jonathan Lasker, Sigmar Polke, Lucio Pozzi, Robert Rauschenberg, David Reed, Gerhard Richter, Julian Schnabel, Frank Stella, Gary Stephan, Taro Suzuki, Cy Twombly, Jeffrey Wasserman.
- 32. The Last Decade: American Artists of the ’80s. Curated by Collins & Milazzo, Tony Shafrazi Gallery, New York, September 15 - October 27, 1990. Color catalogue with texts by Tricia Collins and Richard Milazzo, and Robert Pincus-Witten, with photographic portraits of the artists by Timothy Greenfield-Sanders. Artists: Donald Baechler, Jean-Michel Basquiat, Ashley Bickerton, Mike Bidlo, Ross Bleckner, James Brown, Saint Clair Cemin, George Condo, Carroll Dunham, Eric Fischl, Jedd Garet, Robert Gober, Peter Halley, Keith Haring, Mark Innerst, Jeff Koons, Barbara Kruger, Jonathan Lasker, Annette Lemieux, Sherrie Levine, Robert Mapplethorpe, Allan McCollum, Richard Prince, David Salle, Kenny Scharf, Julian Schnabel, Doug and Mike Starn, Haim Steinbach, Gary Stephan, Philip Taaffe, Mark Tansey, Meyer Vaisman, Meg Webster, Terry Winters, David Wojnarowicz.
- 33. Sal Scarpitta: Race Car on Idaho Potato Track (An Installation). Curated by Collins & Milazzo, Greenberg/Wilson Gallery, in cooperation with Leo Castelli, New York, September 9 - October 20, 1990. Broadside with text by Tricia Collins and Richard Milazzo.
- 34. All Quiet on the Western Front? [75 Americans in Paris]. Curated by Antoine Candau and Gerard Delsol, in collaboration with Collins & Milazzo, Espace Dieu 17, rue Dieu, Paris, France September 26 - December 31, 1990.
- 35. Who Framed Modern Art or the Quantitative Life of Roger Rabbit. Curated by Collins & Milazzo, Sidney Janis Gallery, New York, January 10 - February 16, 1991. Color catalogue with text by Richard Milazzo. Artists: Josef Albers, Arman, Jean Arp, Giacomo Balla, Ford Beckman, Ross Bleckner, Constantin Brâncuși, Charles Clough, Willem de Kooning, Jean Dubuffet, Marcel Duchamp, Stephen Ellis, Alberto Giacometti, Peter Halley, Eva Hesse, Hans Hofmann, Valerie Jaudon, Jasper Johns, Donald Judd, Ellsworth Kelly, Yves Klein, Jeff Koons, Joseph Kosuth, Fernand Léger, Annette Lemieux, Sherrie Levine, Roy Lichtenstein, Sol Lewitt, Kasimir Malevich, Piet Mondrian, Peter Nagy, Louise Nevelson, Georgia O'Keeffe, Pablo Picasso, Jackson Pollock, Fiona Rae, Robert Rauschenberg, Man Ray, Ad Reinhardt, Kurt Schwitters, George Segal, Mike and Doug Starn, Frank Stella, Philip Taaffe, Andy Warhol, Tom Wesselmann.
- 36. Outside America: Going into the 90’s. Curated by Collins & Milazzo, Fay Gold Gallery, Atlanta, Georgia, March - April 1991. Catalogue with text by Tricia Collins and Richard Milazzo. Artists: Ford Beckman, David Carrino, Charles Clough, Billy Copley, Lydia Dona, Stephen Ellis, Suzan Etkin, James Hill, Nancy M. Hoffman, George Horner, Nicholas Howey, Cary S. Leibowitz, Richard Kalina, Dean McNeil, Curtis Mitchell, Vik Muniz, Joseph Nechvatal, Thomas Nozkowski, Dennis Oppenheim, Richard Pettibone, Holt Quentel, Robert Rauschenberg, Hunter Reynolds, Nicholas Rule, Allen Ruppersberg, Frank Schroder, Lorna Simpson, Cary Smith, Buzz Spector, Jessica Stockholder, Taro Suzuki, Tyler Turkle, Jeffrey Wasserman, Robin Winters.
- 37. A New Low. Curated by Collins & Milazzo, Claudio Botello Gallery, Turin, Italy, May 9 - June 15, 1991. Color catalogue with text by Tricia Collins and Richard Milazzo. Artists: Renato Alpegiani, Luigi Antinucci, Billy Copley, Fischli & Weiss, Renato Ghiazza, James Hill, George Horner, Nicholas Howey, Cary S. Leibowitz, Vik Muniz, GianCarlo Pagliasso, Kay Rosen, Tyler Turkle.
- 38. New Era Space. Curated by Collins & Milazzo, New Era Building, sponsored by Leo Castelli, New York, October 3–28, 1991. For text, see Tricia Collins and Richard Milazzo, M/E/A/N/I/N/G, No. 11 (May 1992: 28-37). Artists: James Hill, Harland Miller, Donna Moylan, Jeffrey Plate, Adam Rolston
- 39. New Era Space. Curated by Collins & Milazzo, New Era Building, sponsored by Leo Castelli, New York, November 1–23, 1991. For text, see Tricia Collins and Richard Milazzo, M/E/A/N/I/N/G, No. 11 (May 1992: 28-37). Artists: Robert Beck and Jeff Litchfield, Billy Copley, Joo Chung, Nancy M. Hoffman, Nicholas Howey.
- 40. New Era Space. Curated by Collins & Milazzo, New Era Building, sponsored by Leo Castelli, New York, Nov. 26 - December 21, 1991. For text, see Tricia Collins and Richard Milazzo, M/E/A/N/I/N/G, No. 11 (May 1992: 28-37). Artists: Robert Burke, Tony Feher, Fabian Marcaccio, Joan Snitzer, Tyler Turkle.
- 41. Sal Scarpitta: New Works. Curated by Collins & Milazzo, Annina Nosei Gallery, in cooperation with Leo Castelli, New York, February 7 - March 7, 1991. Color catalogue with texts by Tricia Collins and Richard Milazzo, and Thomas McEvilley and Giorgio Franchetti.
- 42. Theoretically Yours. Curated by Collins & Milazzo, Regione Autonoma della Valle d’Aosta, Chiesa di San Lorenzo, Aosta, Italy, May 29 - June 28, 1992. Color catalogue with portraits of the artists and texts by Tricia Collins and Richard Milazzo. Artists: Renato Alpegiani, Luigi Antinucci, John Armleder, Donald Baechler, Marco Bagnoli, Ford Beckman, Ross Bleckner, Saint Clair Cemin, Suzan Etkin, Renato Ghiazza, Peter Halley, Nicholas Howey, Jeff Koons, Jonathan Lasker, Cary S. Leibowitz, Annette Lemieux, Sherrie Levine, Fabian Marcaccio, Allan McCollum, Donna Moylan, Vik Muniz, GianCarlo Pagliasso, Maurizio Pellegrin, Stefano Peroli, Michaelangelo Pistoletto, Richard Prince, Pruitt-Early, Holt Quentel, Adam Rolston, Haim Steinbach, Philip Taaffe, Meg Webster
- 43. Who’s Afraid of Duchamp, Minimalism, and Passport Photography? Curated by Collins & Milazzo, Annina Nosei Gallery, New York, October 1992. Catalogue with text by Tricia Collins and Richard Milazzo. Artists: Ford Beckham, Lawrence Carroll, Stephen Ellis, Suzan Etkin, Peter Halley, Nicholas Howey, James Hyde, Jonathan Lasker, Annette Lemieux, Fabian Marcaccio, Donna Moylan, Philip Taaffe.
- 44. Needlepoint, Embroidery, Macrame, and Crochet. Curated by Collins & Milazzo, Postmasters Gallery, New York, February 13 - March 13, 1993. Color catalogue with texts by Tricia Collins & Richard Milazzo. Artists: Renato Alpegiani, Devon Dikeou, Sylvie Fleury, Fabian Marcaccio, Donna Moylan, GianCarlo Pagliasso, Marianna Uutinen.
- 45. Donna Moylan: Paintings. Curated by Collins & Milazzo, Grand Salon, New York, March 13 - April 17, 1993.
- 46. Meg Webster: Sculptures. Curated by Collins & Milazzo, Grand Salon, New York, April 20 - May 15, 1993.
- 47. Charles Clough: Paintings and Barry Bridgwood: Paintings (Projects Room). Curated by Collins & Milazzo, Grand Salon, New York, May 20 - June 19, 1993. Catalogue with text by Mary Haus.
- 48. Elvis Has Left the Building (A Painting Show). Curated by Collins & Milazzo, 521 West 23rd Street, sponsored by Sandro Chia, New York, May 26 - June 26, 1993. Catalogue with text by Tricia Collins and Richard Milazzo and a two-minute screenplay by Sandro Chia. Artists: Sergio Bazan, Barry Bridgwood, Robert Burke, Lawrence Carroll, Fabian Cereijido, Joo Chung, Charles Clough, Tomás Clusellas, Julia Condon, Lino Fiorito, Nicholas Howey, James Hyde, Marc Maz, Donna Moylan, Vik Muniz, Gian Carlo Pagliasso, Robin Tewes, Julian Trigo, Alessandro Twombly, Marianna Uutinen.
- 49. Fabian Cereijido: Paintings. Curated by Collins & Milazzo, Grand Salon, New York, June 24 - July 22, 1993.
- 50. Julian Trigo: Paintings. Curated by Collins & Milazzo, Grand Salon, New York, September 11 - October 9, 1993. Catalogue with text by Tricia Collins and Richard Milazzo.
- 51. Vik Muniz: Photographs and Sculptures. Curated by Collins & Milazzo, Grand Salon, New York, October 14 - November 13, 1993. Catalogue with text by Tricia Collins and Richard Milazzo.
- 52. Claudia Zemborain: Paintings. Curated by Collins & Milazzo, Grand Salon, New York, November 20 - December 18, 1993. Catalogue with text by Tricia Collins and Richard Milazzo.
- 53. Sandro Chia: Small Bronze Sculptures. Curated by Collins & Milazzo, Grand Salon, New York, January 8 - February 1994. Catalogue with text by Tricia Collins and Richard Milazzo.
- 54. Tomás Clusellas: Paintings. Curated by Collins & Milazzo, Grand Salon, New York, February 10 - March 5, 1994. Catalogue with texts by Pierre Restany and Fabian Cereijido.
- 55. Alessandro Twombly: Paintings. Curated by Collins & Milazzo, Grand Salon, New York, March 10 - April 9, 1994. Catalogue with text by Tricia Collins and Richard Milazzo.
- 56. Lawrence Carroll: Paintings and David Carrino: Photographs (Projects Room). Curated by Collins & Milazzo, Grand Salon, New York, April 14 - May 14, 1994. Catalogue with text by Charles Riley.
- 57. Peter Halley: Mono-Reliefs. Curated by Collins & Milazzo, Grand Salon, New York, May 19- June 18, 1994. Catalogue with text by Peter Halley.
- 58. A Fistful of Flowers. Curated by Collins & Milazzo, Grand Salon, New York, June 23 - July 1994. Artists: Barry Bridgwood, Robert Burke, Fabian Cereijido, Charles Clough, Suzan Etkin, Rosario Guerrero, Pansy Merriweather, Donna Moylan, Vik Muniz, Mark Turgeon, Alessandro Twombly, Marianna Uutinen.
- 59. Across the River and into the Trees (A Sculpture Show). Curated by Collins & Milazzo, The Rushmore Festival, Woodbury, New York, June 25 - July 10, 1994. Catalogue with text by Tricia Collins and Richard Milazzo. Artists: Willard Boepple, Saint Clair Cemin, John Clement, Charles Clough, James Croak, Paul Dickerson, Devon Dikeou, Suzan Etkin, Joel Fisher, James Hyde, Alain Kirili, Charles Long, Vik Muniz, Dennis Oppenheim, Jeffrey Plate, Sal Scarpitta, Taro Suzuki, Not Vital, Meg Webster.

== Art publications ==
- Radical Consumption and the New Poverty, Collins & Milazzo, (New York: New Observations, 1987) ISSN 0737-5387
- Art at the End of the Social, Collins & Milazzo, with a Swedish translation by Stefan Sandelin (Malmö, Sweden: The Rooseum, 1988) ISBN 0-945295-03-0
- Jonathan Lasker: A Conversation with Collins & Milazzo and 13 Studies for a Painting Entitled "Cultural Promiscuity" (Rome: Gian Enzo Sperone, 1989)
- Hyperframes: A Post-Appropriation Discourse in Art (“The Yale Lectures”), Collins & Milazzo, translated by Giovanna Minelli (Vol I), and by Giovanni Minelli, Marion Laval-Leantet and Benôit Mangin (Vol II) (Paris: Editions Antoine Candau, 1989 and 1990). ISBN 2-908139-00-6
- The Last Decade: American Artists of the ’80s, Collins & Milazzo, (New York: Tony Shafrazi Gallery, 1990)
- Who Framed Modern Art or the Quantitative Life of Roger Rabbit, Collins & Milazzo (New York: Sidney Janis Gallery, 1991)
- Sal Scarpitta: New Works, Collins & Milazzo, (New York: Annina Nosei, in cooperation with Leo Castelli, 1991)

== See also ==
- Collins & Milazzo Exhibitions
- Post-conceptual art
- Postmodern art
