= Joel Otterson =

American artist (born 1959)

Joel Otterson (born in Inglewood, CA, 1959, United States) is an American artist who lives and works in Los Angeles, CA.

== Professional life and education ==
Otterson received his BFA at Parsons School of Design, New York, NY in 1982. In 1983, Otterson exhibited for the first time at Gallery Nature Morte in Manhattan. He would have exhibitions with other notable artists together with artists like Richard Prince, Jeff Koons, and Haim Steinbach.

Otterson is a sculptor with a career of over 30 years, known for reworking domestic forms to explore relationships within the home. His work addresses themes such as the gendering of objects, cultural context, and American identity, using materials like copper pipe, concrete, and blown glass alongside techniques including woodworking, pottery, and needlework.

=== Selected exhibitions ===
Otterson has shown his work internationally at venues such as The Museum of Modern Art (PROJECT series, 1987), the Venice Biennale (1993), the Hammer Museum (Made in L.A, 2012), Whitney Museum of American Art (2014 Whitney Biennial) for which he received much praise, and Maloney Fine Art.

=== Collections ===
Otterson's work is in the permanent collections of Cincinnati Art Museum, Israel Museum, The Broad Foundation (by Edythe and Eli Broad), and the Jewish Museum.
