= Saint Clair Cemin =

Postmodern sculptor (born 1951)

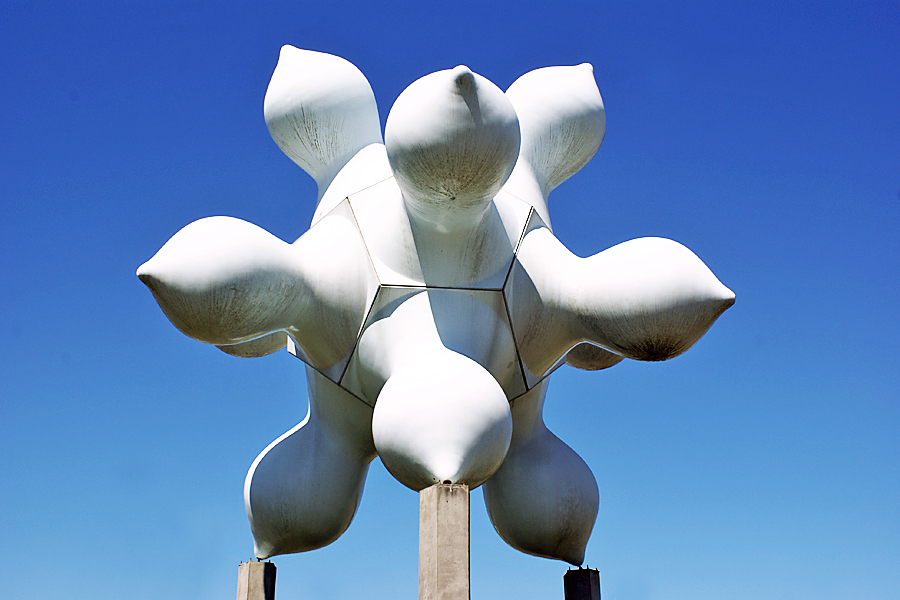
- Born: 1951 (age 74–75); Cruz Alta, Brazil
- Education: École Nationale Superieure des Beaux Arts, Paris 1975-78
- Website: saintclaircemin.net

Saint Clair Cemin (born Cruz Alta, Brazil in 1951) is a postmodern sculptor.

== Life and work ==
Saint Clair Cemin lives and works in New York City and Beijing. His work encompasses multiple styles, approaches, and materials, from neo-surrealism to furniture to toys in popular culture to the history of sculpture.

Cemin became interested in sculpting as a teenager. Once interested in philosophy and physics, he began to focus his attention on art, drawing and working on illustrations for magazines.

Cemin earned his degree at École nationale supérieure des Beaux-Arts in Paris, France, from 1975 to 1978 where he learned printmaking for three years. He moved to New York City shortly after, where he experimented in several fields as a way of earning an income. From 1981 to 1983, Cemin worked in carpentry renovating lofts in New York, cabinet making, and finally sculpture. The artist's first exhibited sculpture was The Granny Ashtray, which has been described as an anti-modernist piece. Throughout the 1980s, Cemin became an integral part of NY's East Village art scene. Some of his works from this era are on permanent exhibition at important institutions such as the Museum of Contemporary Art in Los Angeles. After those formative years in NYC Cemin moved to Egypt and then Paris to pursue sculpture in different environments and with different mediums. After 2010 he returned to NY and continues to create sculptural works in his Brooklyn studio.

In 2012 Saint Clair Cemin had a public exhibition of works along Broadway in Manhattan. Of the several works exhibited on Broadway one "vortex" at the corner of 57th street and Broadway, stood some 40 feet tall.

== Publications ==
In 2005, Richard Milazzo's book on Saint Clair Cemin titled "Saint Clair Cemin: Sculptor from Cruz Alta" was published by Sikkema Jenkins & Co. A book of Saint Clair Cemin's art writings have been published by Edgewise Press titled Fragments of a Mind: Stories and Comments on Art 1987-2004.

== Public monuments ==
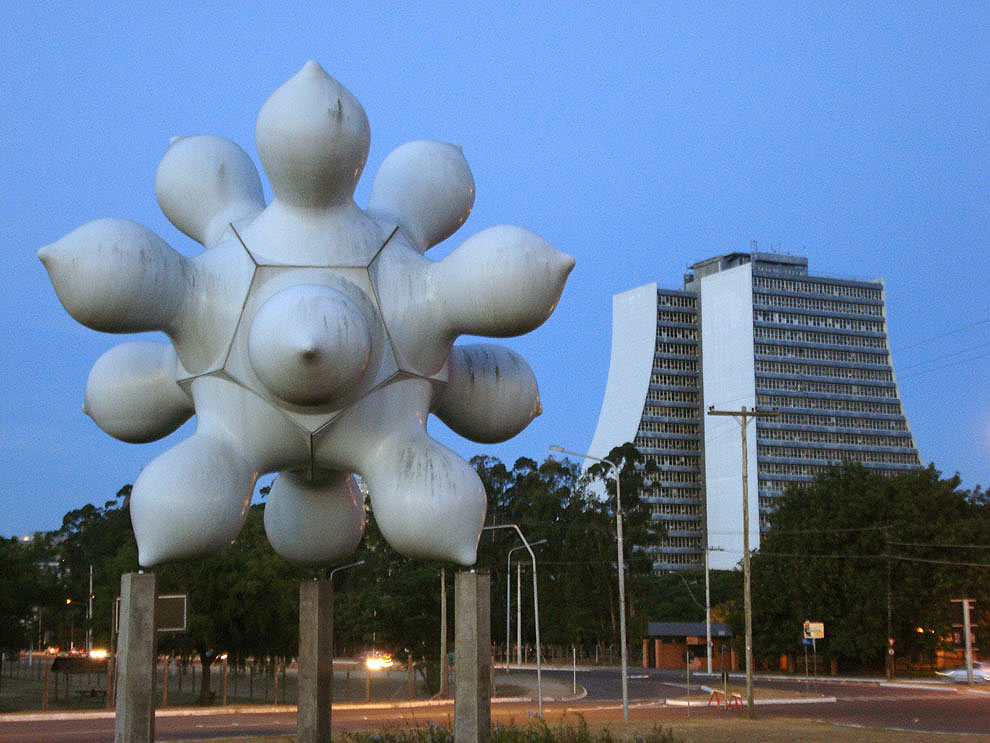
One of Cemin's sculptures, Porto Alegre, Brazil

In 1990 Saint Clair Cemins' first public sculpture was installed in the town of Reston, Virginia. Since then he has had large public monuments installed throughout the world, including "Open" in Schaumburg, Illinois, "Tree" in Bergen, Norway, "Spring" in Båstads Kommun, Sweden. The monument, "Supercuia", pictured aside, is in Porto Alegre, Brazil and was completed in 2003. He received the Biennial Award from the Ueno Royal Museum and the Hakone Open-Air Museum in Japan in 1995.

== Collections ==
Saint Clair Cemin's work is included in the collections of the Whitney Museum of American Art, Fonds National d’Art Contemporain, Paris, France; Emily Fisher Landau Collection, Long Island City, NY; Rooseum, Stockholm, Sweden; Eli Broad Family Foundation, Los Angeles, CA; Museum of Contemporary Art, Los Angeles; and Inhotim, Minas Gerais, Brazil.
