= Brett Reichman =

American painter

Brett Reichman is an American painter and professor at the San Francisco Art Institute. Born in Pittsburgh, Pennsylvania, he has lived and worked in San Francisco since 1984. His work came to fruition in the late 1980s out of cultural activism that addressed the AIDS epidemic and gay identity politics and was curated into early exhibitions that acknowledged those formative issues. These exhibitions included:

- Situation: Perspectives on Work by Lesbian and Gay Artists at New Langton Arts in San Francisco,
- The Anti-Masculine at the Kim Light Gallery in Los Angeles,
- Beyond Loss at the Washington Project for the Arts in Washington, D.C, and
- In A Different Light: Visual Culture, Sexual Identity, Queer Practice at the Berkeley Art Museum, Berkeley, California.

Reichman approached these themes subtly after a legislation passed in 1989 restricting federal funding for art dealing with homosexuality and AIDS. His And the Spell Was Broken Somewhere Over the Rainbow references Oz while indirectly addressing that San Francisco could no longer be viewed as a land of enchantment due to the AIDS crisis.

== Style and theme ==
Reichman's inquiry into the politics of gay culture critiques political correctness and cultural assimilation. He separates the concept of realism from naturalism within a discourse that views popular culture as anxious, obsessed with artificiality and unnatural beauty. His pictures take lubricious fantasy to the point of ridicule, without losing completely a quotient of psychological truth.

Often, Reichman's works, such as Gildcraft Italia Mondrian Vase, include what he collects: mid-century modern furniture and dinnerware. The aesthetics of these mid-century items are often present in his representations of non-normative contemporary gay domestic space. The works in his show Better Living Through Design at the CB1 Gallery are titled after his mid-century furniture and set pieces.

Reichman's gay identity in the age of AIDS drew him to expose social prejudices while expressing his sense of self. The AIDS era drew his consciousness to loss—the loss of life as well as of innocence and the sense of freedom that once prevailed in the gay community. Reichman's 1998 show, It's Hard to Be Happy, displayed at the Orange County Museum of Art, reveals his fascination with duality and misleading appearances. In Threefold, Reichman depicts three elves to describe the awareness and threat of AIDS.

== Technique ==
Reichman's early works use children's toys (such as rubber lambs and pixies) and childhood fables while focusing on a certain loss of cultural innocence.

Reichman draws attention to how posh clothing and other drapery in pre-modern European paintings can communicate the indescribable and unimaginable to viewers. He uses watercolor and gouach with layered crosshatching, which simultaneously builds up and negates his works.

== Exhibitions ==
Reichman has been the subject of numerous solo exhibitions at:

- Gallery Paule Anglim in San Francisco,
- the PPOW Gallery in New York, Feature Inc., New York,
- the Rena Bransten Gallery in San Francisco, and
- the Orange County Museum of Art.

Museums also included his works, such as:

- I Am Not Monogamous in Art AIDS America,
- I Heart Poetry, at Feature, Inc. New York,
- Silence, Exile and Cunning at the Sonoma Valley Museum of Art,
- Kiki: The Proof Is In The Pudding at Ratio 3 Gallery, San Francisco, California,
- Pacific Light: A Survey of California Watercolor 1908-2008, at the Nordic Watercolor Museum, Skärhamn, Sweden.

Reichman's works are in many public collections, including the San Francisco Museum of Modern Art, the Berkeley Art Museum, the Portland Art Museum, and the Orange County Museum of Art.

His work is featured in the publications Art—A Sex Book by John Waters and Bruce Hainley, Untitled Publication (Red Square), by Feature Inc, Pacific Light: A Survey of California Watercolor 1908-2008, the Nordiska Akvarellmuseet and In A Different Light: Visual Culture, Sexual Identity, Queer Practice, Art, AIDS, America, among others.

== Awards and grants ==
- 2012 San Francisco Art Institute, Morgan Library, New York, New York, Faculty Development Grant
- 2005 San Francisco Art Institute, Faculty Development Grant
- 2001 San Francisco Art Institute, Faculty Development Grant
- 1999 Artadia Award
- 1999 Art Council Grant, San Francisco, California

== Bibliography ==
- Baker, Kenneth, “Reichman and Sherwood at Anglim”, San Francisco Chronicle, September 11, 2010, page E3
- Baker, Kenneth, “ Reichman and Beech at Paule Anglim”, San Francisco Chronicle, April 22, 2006, page E10
- Little, Carl, “Brett Reichman at PPOW”, Art In America, January 2006, pp121–122
- Curtis, Cathy, "Art Reviews: " Pieces of Theater in Light, Shadow", Los Angeles Times, July 14, 1998, p.F3K
- Porges, Maria, "Reviews: Brett Reichman, Rena Bransten Gallery", Artforum, September 1997, XXXVI, No. 1, p. 130
- Duncan, Michael, "Queering the Discourse", Art in America, July, 1995, pp. 27–31
- Galloway, Munro, "Manifest Disney: I'Eden Selon Disney: Culture Pop et Peinture", Art Press (special issue on painting), 1995, pp. 163–166
- Bonetti, David, "Childlike Show Reveals Artist's Hidden Elf", San Francisco Examiner, November 29, 1991
