= Paul Weiner =

American contemporary artist (born 1993)

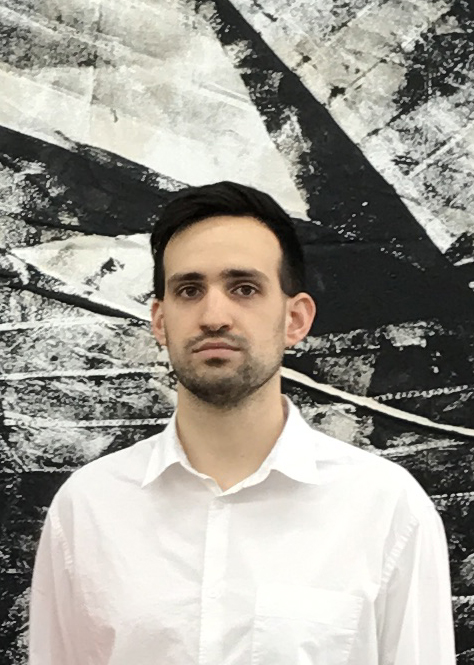
- Born: July 6, 1993 (age 33)
- Education: Syracuse University
- Known for: Artist, painting, drawing, sculpture
- Website: paulowenweiner.com

Paul Weiner is an American contemporary artist known for his paintings, sculptures, and drawings originating from topics of American symbolism, cultural hybridity, place, politics, and violence. He lives and works in Denver, Colorado. Weiner's works have been included in non-profit and university museums such as Mana Contemporary, HF Johnson Gallery of Art at Carthage College, Leeds Arts University, and York St John University as well as a variety of international gallery exhibitions in Australia, Belgium, Germany, the United Kingdom, and the United States.

== Life ==
Paul Weiner was born in Denver, Colorado in 1993 and raised in Aurora, Colorado. Weiner graduated from Syracuse University with a Bachelor of Fine Arts degree. He grew up a short distance from the site of the Columbine massacre and, later, the 2012 Aurora theater shooting.

== Work ==
Weiner is best known for his large-scale American flag monoprint paintings and his works in charcoal on canvas. These works are notable for advancing the American flag painting lineage by using the American flag as a brush and material rather than an illusionistic element or painterly symbol. Weiner's gestural and abstract charcoal works, which reference current events, are created using giant willow branches and detritus from his studio. An article in Westword explains how, in his studio, "virtually every surface is covered in a layer of charcoal and paint." The use of these processes was on display in the works shown at Krupic Kersting Gallery in Cologne, Germany, which received mixed reactions in critical circles. In a review of the 2018 exhibition highlights of the Düsseldorf Cologne Open, Die Welt's Alexandra Wach remarked that Weiner's works are "weniger lieblich" or "less lovely" but that they also gave insight into the dark sensitivities of his generation regarding American politics and democracy. Wach also commented on Weiner's work in Monopol Magazin für Kunst und Leben, where she described his American flag paintings as a "spätromantische Ode an den Untergang" or "a late romantic ode to the downfall." In a 2017 article regarding Weiner's residency at Long Road Projects in Jacksonville, Folio Weekly's Madeleine Peck Wagner described his flag paintings as "designed to challenge viewer's (and his own) notions of patriotism, nationalism and anxiety" and remarked that "censorship is a topic close to the artist. His earlier works dealt with how information is disseminated—paintings that look like redacted documents—and these flag works take the literal fabric of patriotism as their material."

Weiner is also known for his earlier series of works focusing on the legal trial surrounding James Holmes and the 2012 Aurora theater shooting, which comment on the zeitgeist of a city rattled by mass violence and suggest peripheral issues relating to censorship within the American legal system. In the lead up to a 2016 exhibition, Concrete Playground's Sarah Ward described how "the community Denver artist Paul Weiner called his own was rocked by tragedy when a man opened fire in a Colorado movie theatre" and "the horrific events sparked another kind of art: a response." 5280 Magazine describes how his redacted paintings, which are direct transcriptions of significant legal documents from this trial, "became more conceptual in nature" and "those dark black lines became a recurring element in Weiner's earliest explorations of the topic. Young Space's Kate Mothes describes the impact of "violence, especially in such close proximity to the Aurora cinema and its impact on his community" and how it "instilled an entirely new meaning and significance as an expression of self, the politics of painting, and his surroundings."

=== Exhibitions ===
Weiner's solo and group exhibitions have taken place at Mana Contemporary, Chicago, IL; HF Johnson Gallery of Art, Carthage College, Kenosha, Wisconsin; Leeds Arts University, Leeds, England; York St John University, York, England; Krupic Kersting Gallery, Cologne, Germany; TWFINEART, Brisbane, Australia; Durden and Ray Gallery, Los Angeles, CA; Re:Art, Brooklyn, NY; MARQUEE Projects, Bellport, NY; SABOT/MIMI/FASTER, Berlin, Germany; Long Road Projects, Jacksonville, Florida; Alto Gallery, Denver, Colorado; Chabah Yelmani Gallery, Brussels, Belgium; YIA Art Fair, Brussels, Belgium; ARTBandini Fair, Los Angeles, California; Miscellaneous Press, Los Angeles, California; and CTRL+SHFT, Oakland, CA among others.
