= Stephen Westfall =

American painter (born 1953)

- Born: 1953 (age 72–73); Schenectady, New York, U.S.
- Education: University of California, Santa Barbara

Stephen Westfall (born 1953 Schenectady, New York) is an American painter, critic, and professor at Rutgers University and Bard College.

== Biography ==
When Stephen Westfall was an adolescent, he was fascinated by the social spaces created by architecture. By age twelve, he was bringing home books about Louis Kahn, Le Corbusier, and Luis Barragán, architects who carved up space with colored walls. Barragan was more polychromatic, but even white was a color for Corbusier, who also added color to his interior walls in his chapel masterpiece. Stephen Westfall attended University of California, Santa Barbara with a B.A. and M.F.A. in 1978.

After an art class taken at the College of Creative Studies in Santa Barbara which further ignited his already creative spirit, he picked up an art major to go with a Literature major. As a student, he loved 60’s American abstract painting because it seemed to address interior space with the same forthrightness that the architects he admired addressed exterior space. He later received his Master of Fine Arts also from the University of California, Santa Barbara. While he was still an undergraduate, he also began writing art criticism for Art Week, then the only art magazine on the west coast. He has continued to write art criticism after he moved to New York (state), beginning with Arts Magazine in 1981.

== Artwork ==
Westfall's paintings combine post-minimalist geometries and pop to create an awareness of a painting as a thing in the world. His recent canvases are made up of brightly colored diamonds, triangles, and trapezoids that are conjoined and "seem to lean into space rather than recede." Westfall draws inspiration from Caucasian and Navajo rugs, medieval heraldry, Byzantine floor tile, architecture, and early twentieth-century abstraction, to create his minimalist and postminimalist paintings.

Over the course of the last decade, Westfall has focused his work to address architecture more directly and wall paintings have become his way to fuse paintings to architectural scale. He regards these paintings as now being essential to his artistic practice as his paintings on canvas and paper, which are bound by more conventional notions of portability and transferability. Important exhibitions of these wall paintings have taken place at Art Omi in 2014, The McNay Art Museum in 2015, and at the Museum of Art, Architecture and Design at the University of California, Santa Barbara, also in 2015.

In 2018, Westfall worked closely with Queens-based glass fabricator Depp Glass to create the 47 laminated glass panels installed at the 30 Ave Subway Station in New York City. The scale, mirrored glass, and merging movement invoke not only the repertoire of processional themes in classical friezes, but also the movement of public transportation in our contemporary life, in particular the shuttering of light through the mezzanine windows and the bustle of commuters in our mass transit system.

== Exhibitions ==
After Westfall received his MFA in 1978 from the University of California, Santa Barbara, he had his first solo exhibition in 1984 at Tracey Garet in New York’s East Village and earned reviews that took note of his particular brand of geometric abstraction. During the 1980s and 1990s, he continued to have more exhibitions: They were held at Daniel Newburg Gallery in New York, Galerie Paal in Munich, Germany and Galerie Wilma Lock in St. Gallen, Switzerland. In 1995, an exhibition of paintings took place at Andre Emmerich Gallery in New York, followed by several exhibitions in Paris at Galerie Zurcher. Recent work has been exhibited at Kunstgaleriebonn in Germany, David Richard Gallery in Santa Fe, Galerie Gisela Clement in Germany, Robischon Gallery in Denver, LA Projects in Germany, and Anne Morreseri-Marlio Galerie, Switzerland.

Over the years, Westfall has been included in several survey exhibitions of abstract painting, including Abstraction/abstractions, geometries provisoires at the Musée d’art Moderne in Saint-Etienne, France, in 1997. He was also in both exhibitions titled Conceptual Abstraction, the first at Sidney Janis Gallery in 1991, and next in the exhibition that revisited that show which took place at the Hunter College Art Gallery in 2012.

Westfall's works are in the collections of the Whitney Museum of American Art in New York, the Kemper Museum in Kansas City, the Louisiana Museum in Humlebaek, Denmark, the Albertina Museum in Vienna, the Munson Williams Proctor Museum in Utica, New York, the Baltimore Museum of Art, the Museum of Fine Arts, Boston and the Santa Barbara Museum of Art.

His writing has appeared in Art in America, Vogue (magazine), Flash Art, New York (magazine), Hyperallergic, The New York Times, Arts Magazine, ARTnews, Partisan Review, and The New Criterion.

== Awards ==
Westfall has received grants and awards from the National Endowment for the Arts, the American Academy of Arts and Letters, the Nancy Graves Foundation, and the Guggenheim Foundation. He received a Rome Prize Fellowship and spent a year at the American Academy in Rome during 2009 and 2010. He has been a professor at the Mason Gross School of the Arts at Rutgers University since 2005, and a tenured professor since 2010. He was also painting chair at Bard University's Milton Avery School of the Arts for a number of years and now serves as a lecturer. He is a Contributing Editor at Art in America. Westfall is also a member of American Abstract Artists.

- 2019 NYS AIA Excelsior Award (MTA Astoria Station Project)
- Americans for the Arts 2019 Public Art Network (PAN) Year in Review (Astoria Station Project)
- 2009 Rome Prize.
- 2007 Guggenheim Fellowship
- 2006 Nancy Graves Grant for Visual Artists
- 2005 Princeton University Fellow, Humanities Council
- 2002 Academy Award in Painting, American Academy of Arts and Letters
- 1993 National Endowment for the Arts
- 1989 National Endowment for the Arts
- 1988 New York State Council on the Arts
- 1987 National Endowment for the Arts
- 1986 New York State Council on the Arts

== Essays ==
- "AN UNBEARABLE WHITENESS OF BEING ", Lawrence Oliver Gallery
- "Jessica Stockholder", BOMB 41/Fall 1992
- "Mary Gaitskill", BOMB 30/Winter 1990
