= Mark Innerst =

American painter (born 1957)

- Born: 1957 (age 68–69); York, PA
- Education: Kutztown State College

Mark Innerst (born 1957 in York, PA) is an American painter known for his luminous urban landscapes.

== Biography ==
Innerst earned his Bachelor of Fine Arts at Kutztown State College, Kutztown, PA in 1980. He worked as a preparator at the newly formed Metro Pictures Gallery in 1981. There he met Robert Longo and became one of his assistants.

Innerst has been exhibiting in New York City galleries since the early 1980s. He currently lives and works in Philadelphia, PA and Cape May, NJ. He is represented by DC Moore Gallery in New York.

== Work ==
Innerst is known for his modernist paintings of New York City and his small landscape paintings that harken back to American 19th-century Luminism.

The curator Katherine Gass has linked Innerst's work to the landscapes of American painters James McNeill Whistler and Winslow Homer.

Earlier works by Innerst include the Monochromatic Gray Drawings from the early 1980s, the Ultramarine Blue Paintings from 1984 to 1985, and the Amusement Park Paintings from the late 2000s.

Innerst's work has been exhibited widely in the United States and abroad, including shows at the Nelson-Atkins Museum of Art, Kansas City; Contemporary Arts Museum, Houston; and Museum of Contemporary Art, Chicago. His work is in numerous public collections including the Museum of Modern Art, NY, Metropolitan Museum of Art, Ny, Solomon R. Guggenheim Museum, NY, Brooklyn Museum, NY, Albright-Knox Museum, Buffalo, NY, and Indianapolis Museum of Art, IN among others. Innerst lives and works in Philadelphia and Cape May.

== Process ==
Innerst paints in acrylic on board and oil on canvas. He builds layer upon layer of paint onto the surface, which he keeps flat on a table as he works. Paintings are ultimately glazed and joined with a frame custom-made by Innerst. He also creates many preliminary photographs, drawings, and painted studies. He usually underpaints his paintings in bright red.
