= James Welling =

American photographer (born 1951)

James Welling (born 1951 in Hartford, Connecticut) is an American artist, photographer and educator living in New York City. He attended Carnegie-Mellon University where he studied drawing with Gandy Brodie and at the University of Pittsburgh where he took modern dance classes. Welling transferred to the California Institute of the Arts in Valencia, California in 1971 and received a B.F.A. and an M.F.A. in the School of Art. At Cal Arts, he studied with John Baldessari, Wolfgang Stoerchle and Jack Goldstein.

== Life and work ==
Welling began to make photographs in 1976 using a 4x5 view camera. His first body of work, Los Angeles Architecture and Portraits, consisted of photographs of his friends and local architecture. In 1977 he began Diary/Landscape, photographs of his great-grandparents' diary that he paired with landscapes made in Connecticut. In 1978 he moved to New York and began a sequence of abstract photographs, Aluminum Foil, Drapes, Gelatin Photographs. These works were exhibited at Metro Pictures, New York in exhibitions in 1981, 1982 and 1984. In 2002 The Metropolitan Museum of Art acquired the complete set of Aluminum Foil photographs and in 2011 the Art Institute of Chicago acquired the complete Diary/Landscape.

In 1988, Welling began Railroad Photographs, a body of work that documented railroad landscapes in North America. These photographs were exhibited at Jay Gorney Modern Art, New York, documenta 9, Kassel, Germany and Donald Young Gallery, Seattle. In the late 1980s Welling began Degrades, color photograms ranging from 10 x 8 inches to 40 x 30 inches, a project that continues to the present. In 1991 Welling began Light Sources, various sized black and white photographs made in America and Europe. Light Sources was first exhibited at Galerie Philip Nelson in Paris in 1994 and in 2014 the Tate Modern, London acquired a core group of Light Sources.

In 1995 Welling joined the faculty of the Department of Art at the University of California, Los Angeles. At UCLA Welling began to work with digital technology and with color. In Glass House, (2005–10) Welling photographed of the eponymous home of architect Philip Johnson with an array of colored filters in front of his digital camera. In Wyeth (2009–15) Welling used digital collage and subtle chromatic alterations to record the places where the American artist Andrew Wyeth painted. The complete series was exhibited at the Brandywine River Museum of Art.

Welling returned to modern dance with Choreograph, a series of digital prints consisting of chromatically intense superimpositions of dance, architecture and landscape. Choreograph was exhibited at David Zwirner, New York, Regen Projects, Los Angeles, (both shows designed by Johnston Mark Lee) Galerie Marta Cervera, Madrid, Galerie Marian Goodman, Paris and at the George Eastman Museum, Rochester, 2020. A companion volume, Choreograph, was published by Aperture in 2020.

Currently, Welling teaches in the Visual Art Program at the Lewis Center at Princeton University.

== Recognition and awards ==
- In 2014, Welling was named one of the recipients of the Infinity Award given by the International Center of Photography, New York.
- 2009 Pilara Foundation Distinguished Visiting Photography Fellow
- 2008 International Association of Art Critics Award of Excellence, First Place/Best Show in a Commercial Gallery Nationally
- 1999 DG BANK-Förderpreis Fotografie award, Sprengel Museum Hannover

== Publications ==
- James Welling: Photographs 1977–1990. Bern: Kunsthalle Bern, 1990.
- Usines de Dentelle. Calais: Le Channel, Scene Nationale de Calais, 1993.
- Wolfsburg. Wolfsburg: Kunstmuseum Wolfsburg, 1994.
- Light Sources. Gent: Imschoot, 1996.
- New Abstractions. Hannover, Germany: Sprengel Museum, 1999
- James Welling, Photographs 1974–1999. Columbus, Ohio: Wexner Center for the Arts, 2000.
- Abstract. Brussels, Belgium: Palais de Beaux-Arts, 2002.
- Glass House. Bologna: Damiani, 2010
- Light Sources. London / Göttingen: SteidlMACK, 2010.
- The Mind on Fire. New York: Prestel, 2012
- Monograph. New York: Aperture, 2013.
- Diary/Landscape. Chicago: University of Chicago Press, 2014. ISBN 9780226204123.
- Things Beyond Resemblance. Chadds Ford: Brandywine River Museum of Art, 2015
- Metamorphosis. Munich: Prestel, 2017
- Meridian. Roman Nvmerals: New York, 2017

== Exhibitions ==
Group exhibitions include Indian Summer, Project Inc, Cambridge, 1974; Forest of Signs, MoCA Los Angeles, 1989; documenta 9, Kassel, 1992; Prospect 96, Cologne, 1996; the Whitney Biennial, New York City; 2008; The Pictures Generation, 1974–1984, the Metropolitan Museum of Art, New York, 2009, This Will Have Been: Art, Love & Politics in the 1980s, MCA, Chicago, 2012. Solo exhibitions at museums and alternative spaces include, Le Channel, Calais, 1993; Arts Club of Chicago, 1994; the Camden Art Center, London, 1996; Kunstmuseum, Luzern, 1998; Albany Institute of History and Art, Albany, 2004; Minneapolis Institute of the Arts, 2010; Wadsworth Atheneum, Hartford, 2012; University of Massachusetts, Amherst, 2013. Retrospective shows include Kunsthalle, Bern, 1990; Wexner Center, Columbus, OH, 2000; MoCA, Los Angeles, 2001; the Palais de Beaux Arts, Brussels, 2002; Art Gallery of York University, Toronto, 2002, MK Gallery, Milton Keynes, 2012; the Contemporary Art Gallery, Vancouver, 2012; the Cincinnati Art Museum, Cincinnati, 2013; the Hammer Museum, Los Angeles, 2013, S. M. A. K, Gent 2017, the KunstForum, Vienna, 2017.

== Collections ==
Welling's work is held in the following permanent collections:

- Art Institute of Chicago, Chicago
- Brandywine River Museum of Art, Pennsylvania
- Centre Georges Pompidou, Paris
- Hammer Museum, Los Angeles
- Los Angeles County Museum of Art
- Metropolitan Museum of Art, New York
- Mumok, Vienna
- Museum of Contemporary Art, Los Angeles
- Museum of Fine Arts, Boston
- Museum of Modern Art, New York
- National Gallery of Art, Washington, D.C.
- Solomon R. Guggenheim Museum, New York
- Tokyo Metropolitan Museum of Photography
- Tate Modern, London
- Wadsworth Atheneum, Hartford, CT
- Whitney Museum of American Art, New York
- The Olympic Collection at University of Inland Norway at Lillehammer
