= Peter Nagy (artist) =

American artist (1959–2026)

Peter Nagy in 2014

Peter Allen Nagy (November 11, 1959 – October 13, 2026) was an American artist known for his post-conceptual art of the 1980s and as an art gallerist. He is closely associated with Gallery Nature Morte, which he co-founded with artist Alan Belcher in New York City's East Village in 1982. Gallery Nature Morte remained open until 1988 and is considered a major part of the Collins & Milazzo exhibitions sensual conceptualism scene. In 1992, Nagy moved to New Delhi, India, where Gallery Nature Morte is now located.

== Early life and education ==
Nagy was born in Bridgeport, Connecticut, on November 11, 1959, and grew up in Fairfield, Connecticut. He studied at the Parsons School of Design, receiving a degree in communication design in 1981.

== Career as gallerist ==
With artist Alan Belcher, Nagy opened Gallery Nature Morte in the East Village of Manhattan in 1982. Nagy was part of a generation of East Village artist/gallery owners who established a small, trendy, post-minimal alternative to the established SoHo and uptown art scenes. The gallery was open for six years, until 1988. It combined conceptualism and pop art, exploring the relationship between art and commodity.

In 1992, Nagy moved to New Delhi, where he revived Gallery Nature Morte in 1997. Indian artist Subodh Gupta said of him: "He has fresh eyes and has provided a platform for contemporary artists." In 2021, the gallery opened two additional exhibition spaces in the Indian capital. In 2024, Nature Morte opened a branch in Mumbai.

== Art career ==
In the early 1980s, Nagy became known for works he created by mixing painting techniques with the technology of photocopy machines. One series he executed during this period, International Survey Condominiums, used photocopying as a tool to combine timelines of art history with the floor plans of art museums.

Nagy's work is included in the collections of the Whitney Museum, the Los Angeles Museum of Contemporary Art, the Brooklyn Museum, and the Metropolitan Museum of Art.

In 2014, Eisbox Projects published an exhaustive account of Nagy's work by Richard Milazzo in the book Peter Nagy, Entertainment Erases History – Works 1982 to 2004 to the Present.

In 2020, Deitch Projects held a retrospective exhibition in New York City of Nagy's works from the 1980s.

Nagy was represented by the New York gallery Magenta Plains.

== Writing ==
Nagy authored seven reference articles on contemporary Indian artists, all published on September 22, 2005, in Grove Art Online, contained in Oxford Art Online. Their titles are "Dodiya, Atul", "Dube, Anita", "Gupta, Subodh", "Pushpamala N.", "Raqs Media Collective", " "Sheikh, Nilima", and "Sundaram, Vivan".

== Death ==
Nagy died at his home in New Delhi after a long battle with cancer, on October 13, 2026, at the age of 66.
