= Sarah Charlesworth =

American conceptual artist and photographer

- Born: Sarah Edwards Charlesworth; March 29, 1947; East Orange, New Jersey, U.S.
- Died: June 25, 2013 (aged 66); Hartford, Connecticut, U.S.
- Education: Bradford College and Barnard College
- Known for: Conceptual art
- Spouse: Amos Poe (m. 1983–2010)
- Awards: John Simon Guggenheim Fellowship Award, Visual Art (1995)

Sarah Edwards Charlesworth (March 29, 1947 – June 25, 2013) was an American conceptual artist and photographer. She is considered part of The Pictures Generation, a loose-knit group of artists working in New York in the late 1970s and early 1980s, all of whom were concerned with how images shape our everyday lives and society as a whole.

== Early life and education ==
Charlesworth was born in East Orange, New Jersey, and raised in Summit, New Jersey. She received a Bachelor of Arts degree from Barnard College in 1969. Her undergraduate thesis project, a work of conceptual art devoid of text, was a 50-print study of the Solomon R. Guggenheim Museum. Prior to that she studied under Douglas Huebler at Bradford College. After completing her degree, she studied briefly under the photographer Lisette Model at The New School. After college, she worked as a freelance photographer and became active in downtown Manhattan art circles.

== Work ==
Charlesworth worked in photographic series, but stated in a 1990 interview that she had not really thought of herself as a photographer. She stated, rather, that she viewed her work as investigating questions about the world and her role in it, but realized as of that point that she had been investigating those questions through the medium of photography for the past twelve years.

In 1975, Charlesworth and fellow conceptual artists Michael Corris, Preston Heller, Joseph Kosuth, Andrew Menard, and Mel Ramsden founded The Fox, a magazine dedicated to art theory, but the magazine only remained in publication until 1976. Along with Glenn O'Brien, Betsy Sussler, Liza Bear, and Michael McClard, she co-founded BOMB magazine in 1981. Charlesworth also created the cover art for the very first edition of BOMB magazine.

Charlesworth worked in series, exploring one idea to its conclusion. For a series called Modern History (1977–79), she photographed, at actual size, the front pages of 29 American and Canadian newspapers and blanked out everything except for their photographs and mastheads. For Movie-Television-News-History (1979), a part of the series, Charlesworth selected a specific event – the shooting of American journalist Bill Stewart by the Nicaraguan National Guard – and presented it as it was reported on June 21, 1979, in 27 American newspapers. All images in the final work were printed at the same size as the original newspapers.

In February 1980, Charlesworth created Stills, a series of harrowing, six-and-a-half-foot-tall photographs depicting bodies falling from buildings. When Stills was first shown in 1980 in Tony Shafrazi's East Village apartment, it consisted of seven images. To create the series, Charlesworth scoured news wires and the archives of the New York Public Library for images of people plunging through the air, having jumped out of a windows to commit suicide or because of a catastrophe like fire. After appropriating the photograph, she would crop or tear it, often leaving the edges ragged so that it appeared to be haphazardly torn like a homemade clipping. She would then rephotograph the image and enlarge it. Charlesworth later expanded the series, printing an eighth work from her original source material in 2009 and – as a commission of the Art Institute of Chicago – creating a set of six new ones from the original transparencies that were never printed. Each gelatin silver print was made and mounted to the exact specifications of those she created in 1980.

In her "Objects of Desire" series (1983–1988), Cibachrome prints of appropriated images – typically a cutout picture of a single object, including a gold bowl and a statue of a Buddha – are photographed against bright, laminated monochrome backgrounds that match their lacquered frames.

In the series Renaissance Paintings and Renaissance Drawings (both 1991), Charlesworth combined imagery from disparate Italian Renaissance paintings and drawings to make new, often ironic paintings and drawings.

Charlesworth began to photograph actual objects only in the early 1990s. Her series The Academy of Secrets is Charlesworth's attempt to convey her emotions through using abstracted images of objects that have symbolic associations. She illustrated how the way light falls on objects affects our perceptions of them as the subject of her own 2012 solo exhibition Available Light.

Charlesworth held various teaching positions at New York University, the School of Visual Arts, and Hartford University. Before her death she taught Master Critique in the MFA Photography, Video and Related Media Program and The School of Visual Arts. A major influence on a new generation of artists, including Sara VanDerBeek and Liz Deschenes, she was appointed to the faculty of Princeton University in 2012.

Charlesworth's work is included in the collections of museums around the world, which in 2012 included the Art Institute of Chicago acquiring the complete series (14 photographs) of her over-lifesize series Stills (1980), and the Museum of Modern Art acquired her 27-photo piece Movie-Television-News-History (1979).

== Death ==
Charlesworth had two children with her former husband, filmmaker Amos Poe. Charlesworth died of a brain aneurysm on June 25, 2013, at the age of 66. She lived and worked both in New York City and in Falls Village, Connecticut, at the time of her death.

== Exhibitions ==
Charlesworth's work was the subject of more than 40 solo exhibitions at venues including the Centre d'art contemporain, Geneva (1977), the Queens Museum of Art, New York (1992), the National Museum of Women in the Arts, Washington, D.C. (1998), and the Art Institute of Chicago (2014). A 1998 survey organized by SITE Santa Fe in Santa Fe, New Mexico, toured to four additional museums. Her work was included in the Whitney Biennial (1985) and the Venice Biennale (1986). In 1995, she cocurated Somatogenies at New York's Artists Space with fellow artists Cindy Sherman and Laurie Simmons.
