= Haim Steinbach =

Israeli-American artist

Haim Steinbach (Hebrew: חיים שטיינבך; born 1944 in Rehovot, Palestine) is an Israeli-American artist, based in New York City. His work consists of arrangements of everyday objects, presented in “Displays” and shelves of his own making.

== Life and work ==
Since the late 1970s Steinbach's art has been focused on the selection and arrangement of objects, above all everyday objects. In order to bring them to light, he has been conceiving structures and framing devices for their presentation. Steinbach presents objects, ranging from the natural to the ordinary, the artistic to the ethnographic, giving form to art works that underscore their identity and inherent meanings. Exploring the psychological, aesthetic, cultural and ritualistic aspects of objects as well as their context, Steinbach has redefined the status of the object in art.

He lives and works in New York with his partner, Gwen Smith and son.

== Exhibitions ==
After his 1979 and 1980 solo shows at Artists Space and Fashion Moda in the New York, Steinbach's interest in the world of objects made him a significant figure in the creative discourse of Eighties' New York. In 1983 Steinbach worked as a guard and caretaker of The New York Earth Room by Walter de Maria. Steinbach participated with Group Material, an artist-run collaborative which exhibited in stores, apartments, and subways, and also showed his work at the new galleries in the East Village, including Jay Gorney Modern Art and Nature Morte.

By the second half of the decade, Steinbach's work gained increasing attention in both America and Europe, and was included in various international shows: "New Sculpture", at the Renaissance Society of Chicago and "Prospect 86", at the Kunstverien in Frankfurt, in 1986; "El arte y su doble", at the Fundacion Caja de Pensiones, Madrid, "Les courtiers du desire", at the Pompidou Center, Paris, and the Group Material installation at Documenta 8, Kassel, in 1987; "Horn of Plenty", at the Stedelijk Museum, Amsterdam, and "A Forest of Signs", at the Museum of Contemporary Art, Los Angeles, 1988. He also had numerous solo shows at important galleries, such as Sonnabend Gallery, New York; Rhona Hoffman Gallery, Chicago; Margo Leavin Gallery, Los Angeles; Galleria Lia Rumma, Naples; and Galerie Yvon Lambert, Paris.

By the late 1980s, Steinbach was recognized as one of the world's leading contemporary artists. One person shows were organized at the capc Musée d'Art Contemporain, Bordeaux in 1988, the Palais des Beaux-Arts, Brussels (with John Knight), in 1991, the Witte de With Center for Contemporary Art, Rotterdam, in 1992, and at the Guggenheim Museum, in New York (with Ettore Spalletti), in 1993.

Throughout the 1990s, his work has been included in many important shows, for example Metropolis, at the Martin-Gropius Haus, Berlin in 1991; Documenta 9, Kassel and The Boundary Rider, Ninth Sydney Biennale in 1992; Viaggio Verso Citera, XLV Venice Biennale in 1993; Passions privée at the Musée d'Art Moderne de la Ville de Paris in 1995; NowHere, at the Louisiana Museum of Art Humblebeak in 1996; Città Natura, at the Botanical Gardens and the Palazzo delle Esposizioni in Rome, and Passato, Presente, Futuro XLVI Venice Biennale, in 1997; Pop/ Abstraction at the Museum of American Art, at the Pennsylvania Academy of the Fine Arts, Philadelphia in 1998; Dinge in der Kunst des XX. Jahrhunderts, Haus der Kunst, 2000; Partage d'Exotismes, Biennale de Lyon, 2000; Shopping, Schirn Kunsthalle, 2002.

In 1995, a major survey of Haim Steinbach's work took place at the Castello di Rivoli Museum of Contemporary Art in Turin, Italy. Other important one person museum shows followed at the Art Gallery of York University, Toronto, 1996; Museum Moderner Kunst Stiftung Ludwig, Vienna, 1997; Neuer Berliner Kunstverein, Berlin and Haus der Kunst, Munich, 2000 and the Serpentine Gallery, London, 2014.

Haim Steinbach's work has been the subject of discussion in numerous publications, such as Artforum, 1988 ("Haim Steinbach's Wild, Wild, West", Germano Celant); Artscribe, 1988 ("The Consumption of Everyday Life", John Miller); and Flash Art International, 1996 ("Haim Steinbach: Naked in the Nineties", Jen Budney). His work has been discussed in numerous anthologies such as: L'Ivresse du Reel: L-Objet dans l'art du XXè siècle, 1993; Return of the Real, 1996; Art of the 20th Century, 1998; Art Since 1940 – Strategies of Being, 1995; Conceptual Art, 1998; and Modernism in Dispute, 1993. Publications devoted to his work accompanied one person exhibitions as follows: capc Musee d'Art Contemporain de Bordeaux, 1998; Castello di Rivoli, 1995; Museum Moderner Kunst Stiftung Ludwig, Vienna, 1997; Neuer Berliner Kunstverein, Berlin; Haus der Kunst, Munich, 2000 and the Serpentine Gallery, London, 2014.

== Education ==
1971-73 Yale University, New Haven, CT, M.F.A.

1965-66 Université d'Aix Marseille, France, Diploma

1962-68 Pratt Institute, Brooklyn, NY, B.F.A.

== Sources ==
- Haim Steinbach, Published by Ritter Klagenfurt, 1995
- Haim Steinbach, Edited by Ida Gianelli, Published by Charta, 1999
