= Richard Milazzo =

American art historian

Richard Milazzo is a critic, curator, publisher, independent scholar, and poet from New York City. In the 1970s, he was the editor and co-publisher of Out of London Press. He is the co-founding publisher and editor of Edgewise Press. In the 1980s, under the rubric of Collins & Milazzo, he co-curated numerous Collins & Milazzo Exhibitions and co-wrote with Tricia Collins essays on art and art theory.

== Life and work and Edgewise Press ==
Richard Milazzo is a graduate of McBurney School and Franklin and Marshall College. In the 1970s, he earned an M.A. for his thesis on Ezra Pound’s Cantos at City College of New York.

He is the editor of Edgewise Press, a small press art publication house founded by Milazzo in 1995. It maintains editorial offices in New York and Paris and is dedicated to publishing small, uniformly packaged, paperback books on art criticism, art theory, aesthetics, philosophy, fiction and poetry.

Since 1982, he has worked internationally as a critic and curator in the art world. In the early 1980s, he co-published and co-edited Effects : Magazine for New Art Theory in the East Village.

Among the many publications of those years were Radical Consumption and the New Poverty (New York: New Observations, 1987); Art at the End of the Social (Malmö, Sweden: The Rooseum, 1988); and Hyperframes: A Post-Appropriation Discourse in Art, the lectures they delivered as Senior Critics at Yale University in 1988 and 1989. They were reissued in an Italian edition by Campanotto Editore in Udine in 2005. In 2014 Milazzo authored the book Peter Nagy: Entertainment Erases History (Works 1982 to 2004 to the Present) for Eisbox Projects.

== Collins & Milazzo ==
The idea of neo-conceptual art (sometimes later termed post-conceptual art) articulated by Tricia Collins and Richard Milazzo in the early 1980s in New York City, brought to prominence a new generation of artists through their copious writings and curatorial activities. It was their exhibitions and writings that originally fashioned the theoretical context for a new kind of neo (or post) conceptual art; one that argued simultaneously against Neo-Expressionism and The Pictures Generation. It was through this context that the work of many of the artists associated with Neo-Conceptualism (or what some of the critics reductively called Simulationism and Neo Geo) was first brought together.

== See also ==
- Post-conceptual art
- Postmodern art
