= 1960 in art =

Events from the year 1960 in art.

== Events ==
- August 10 – The Scottish National Gallery of Modern Art opens at Inverleith House in the Royal Botanic Garden Edinburgh.
- December – The Huysman Gallery is founded in Los Angeles.
- Launch of Nouveau réalisme movement.
- The Pace Gallery is founded in Boston, Massachusetts.

== Awards ==
- Archibald Prize: Judy Cassab – Stanislaus Rapotec
- Prix de Rome (for painting) – Pierre Carron

== Works ==
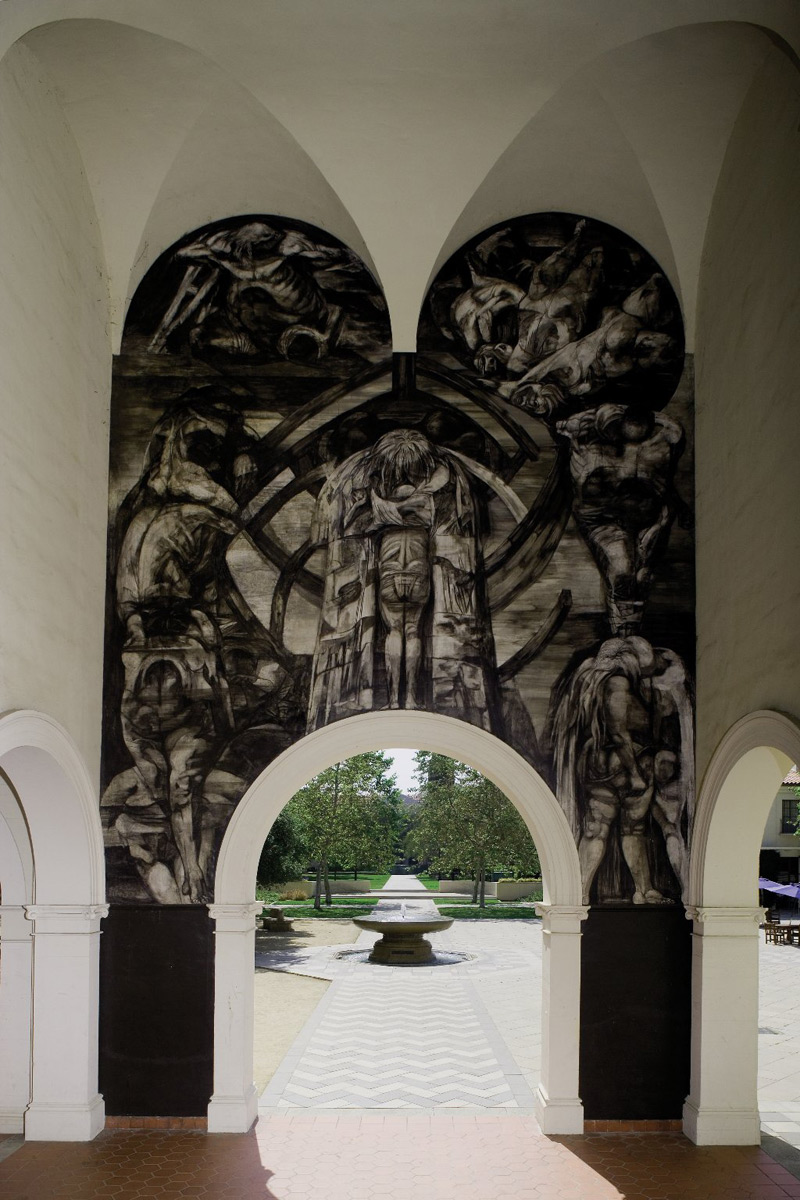
Rico Lebrun's Genesis mural at Pomona College

- Bison (stone sculpture, University of Oregon, Eugene, Oregon)
- Salvador Dalí – The Ecumenical Council
- M. C. Escher – Ascending and Descending (lithograph)
- Alberto Giacometti – bronzes
  - Large Standing Woman I (Museum of Fine Arts, Houston)
  - Monumental Head (Hirshhorn Museum and Sculpture Garden, Washington, D.C.)
- Barbara Hepworth
  - Archaeon
  - Figure for Landscape (bronze)
- Edward Hopper – Second Story Sunlight
- M. F. Husain – The Prancing Horse
- Alex Katz - Black Dress
- Yves Klein
  - Anthropometries of The Blue Epoch (performance art)
  - A Leap Into The Void
- Alberto Korda – Guerrillero Heroico (photograph of Che Guevara)
- Peter Lanyon – Thermal
- Rico Lebrun – Genesis
- Julio Le Parc - Mobile Transport Theme
- Norman Lewis - American Totem
- Morris Louis – Unfurled paintings
- Piero Manzoni – Corpo d'aria (artist's multiple)
- William McMillan – Lion and Unicorn statues for Kensington Central Library, London
- Ivan Meštrović – Immigrant Mother (bronze)
- Pablo Picasso – Bust of a Seated Woman (Jacqueline Roque)
- Ceri Richards – Cathedrale Engloutie
- Will Roberts – Woman with Cup of Tea
- Norman Rockwell – Triple Self-Portrait
- Antoni Tàpies - Cnvas Burned to Matter (circa)
- Jean Tinguely – Homage to New York (self-destroying sculpture)
- Andy Warhol – Campbell's Soup Cans
- Robert Whitman - American Moon (performance)

== Births ==
- February 21 – Isaac Julien, Black British installation artist and filmmaker
- March 13 – Joe Ranft, American magician, animation storyboard artist and voice actor (d. 2005)
- March – Philip Mould, English art dealer and historian
- July 28 – Jon J Muth, American author and illustrator
- August 13 – Lorna Simpson, African American photographic and video artist
- September – Shaun Greenhalgh, English art forger
- September 21 – Maurizio Cattelan, Italian satirical sculptor
- October 2 – Joe Sacco, Maltese-born comics journalist
- December 22 – Jean-Michel Basquiat, American neo-expressionist painter (suicide 1988)
- December 26 – Andrew Graham Dixon, British art historian and broadcaster
- date unknown
  - Ken Currie, British figurative painter
  - Antonia Papatznaki, Greek artist

== Deaths ==
- January 12 – William Adams Delano, American architect (b. 1874)
- January 16 – Rudulph Evans, American sculptor (b. 1878)
- February 8 – Hakuyō Fuchikami, Japanese photographer (b. 1889)
- February 22 – Paul-Émile Borduas, Canadian painter (b. 1905)
- March 3 – Nina Veselova, Russian painter (b. 1922)
- March 18 – Alexander V. Kuprin, Russian painter (b. 1880)
- March 26 – Francisco Goitia, Mexican realist painter (b. 1882)
- April 13 – Eric Kennington, English sculptor and war artist (b. 1888)
- May 8 – Hugo Alfvén, Swedish musician and painter (b. 1872)
- May 16 – Igor Grabar, Russian painter, publisher, and art historian (b. 1871)
- May 27 – James Montgomery Flagg, American illustrator, poster artist (b. 1877)
- June 6 – Ernest L. Blumenschein, American painter, member of the Taos art colony (b. 1874)
- August 8 – Georg Mayer-Marton, Hungarian-British graphic artist (b. 1897)
- September 20 – David Park, American painter (b. 1911)
- October 22
  - Morgan Dennis, American painter and illustrator (b. 1892)
  - Alexander Matveyev, Russian sculptor (b. 1878)
  - Sreten Stojanović, Serbian sculptor (b. 1898)
- November 14 – Anne Bonnet, Belgian painter (b. 1908)
- November 17 – Gene Ahern, American comic-strip artist (b. 1895)
- November 29 – Fortunato Depero, Italian futurist painter, sculptor, and designer b. 1892)
- December 4 - Dean Cornwell - American illustrator, muralist, and painter (b. 1892)
- date unknown

-Charles Pillet, French sculptor and engraver (b. 1869

== See also ==
- 1960 in Fine Arts of the Soviet Union
