= Prometheus (Orozco) =

Mural by José Clemente Orozco

- Prometeo (Spanish)
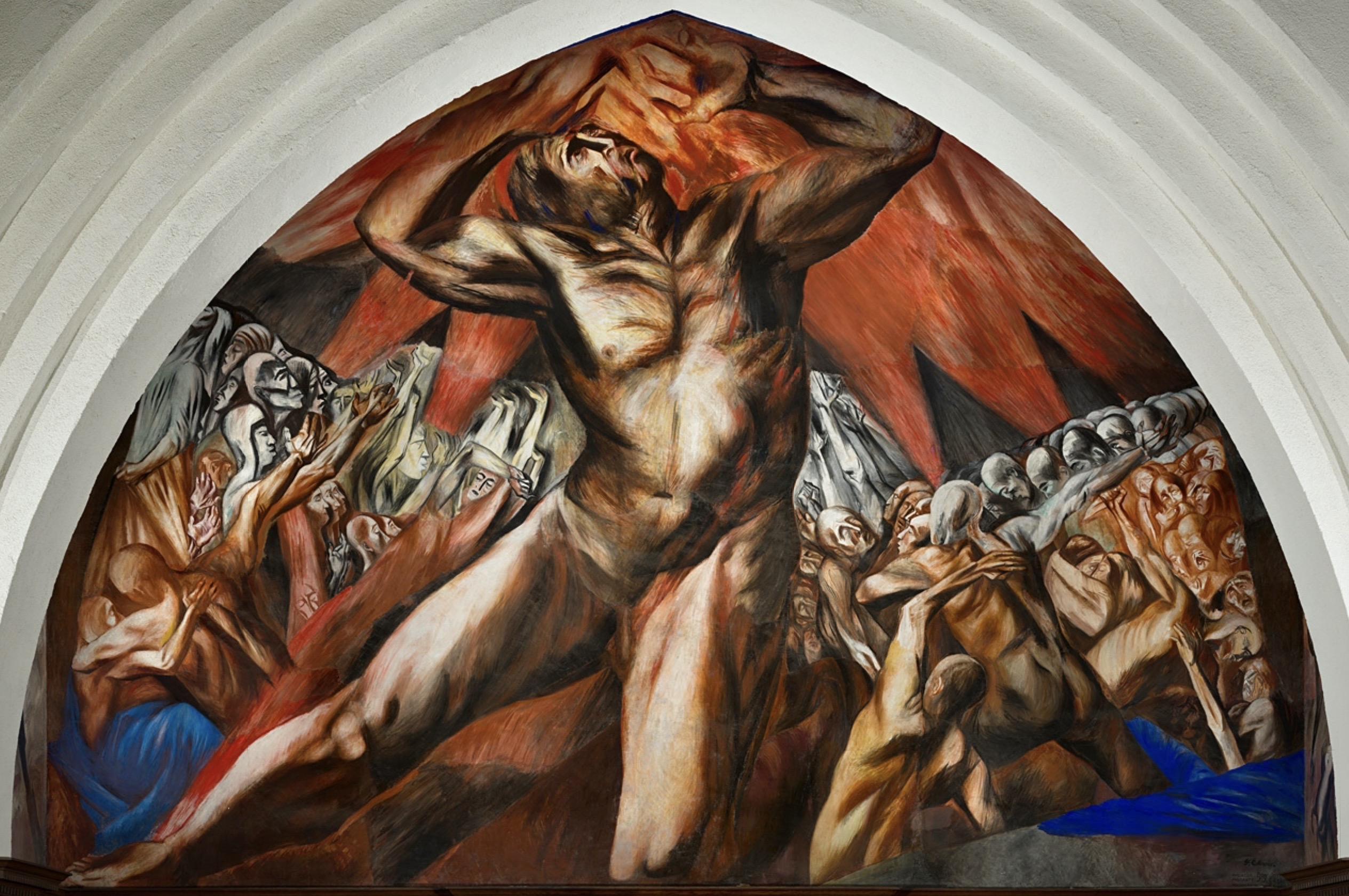
- Artist: José Clemente Orozco
- Year: 1930
- Medium: Fresco
- Movement: Mexican muralism
- Dimensions: 610 cm × 870 cm (20 feet × 28 feet)
- Location: Frary Dining Hall, Pomona College, Claremont

Prometheus (Spanish: Prometeo) is a fresco by Mexican muralist José Clemente Orozco depicting the Greek Titan Prometheus stealing fire from the heavens to give to humans. It was commissioned for the Frary Dining Hall of Pomona College in Claremont, California, and completed in June 1930, becoming the first modern fresco in the United States. It has received widespread critical acclaim.

== Description ==
The mural is above a fireplace at the north end of the refectory of Frary Dining Hall at Pomona College. It consists of four panels: a main one facing the open eating area of the dining hall, two side ones, and an overhead one. The Titan Prometheus of ancient Greek mythology dominates the main panel, reaching for fire to give to humans, an act for which he would later be punished by Zeus. Surrounding his muscular, contorted figure is a crowd of people reacting to the gift, with some welcoming it and others scorning it. The color palette features heavy use of reds, blues, and black.

Prometheus side panels

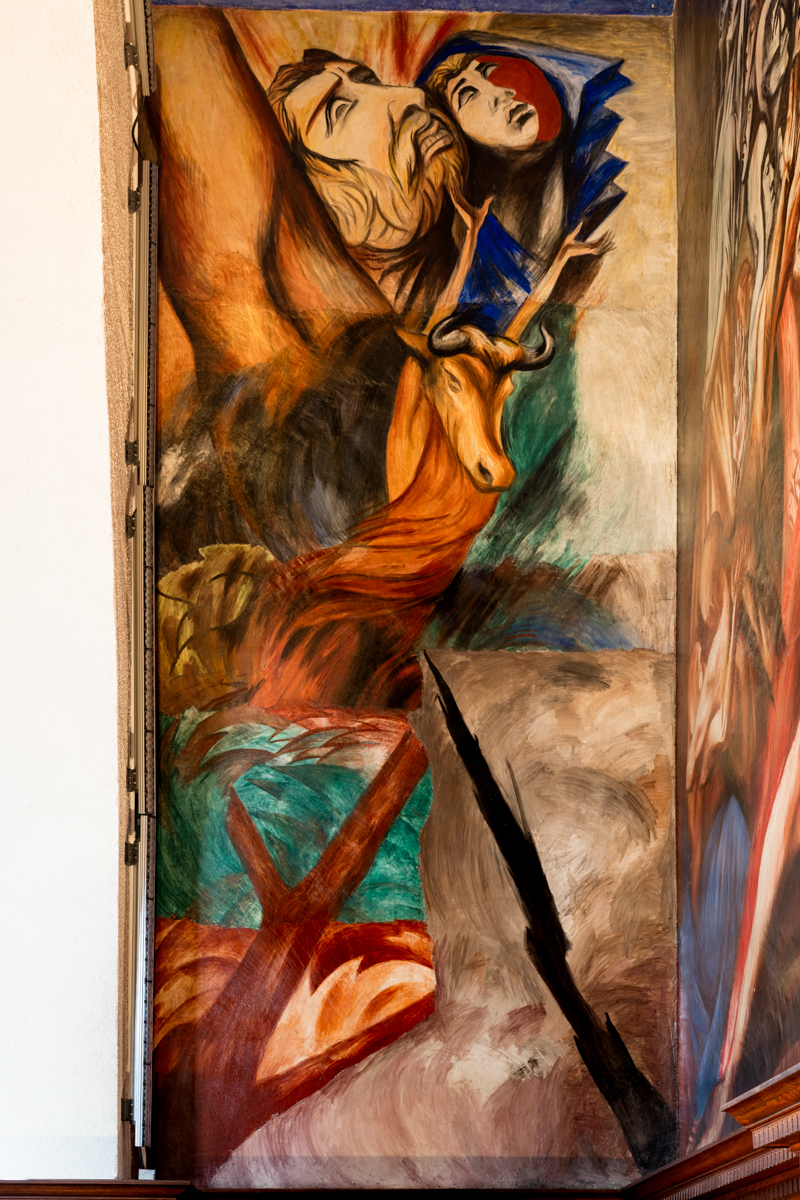
Left panel

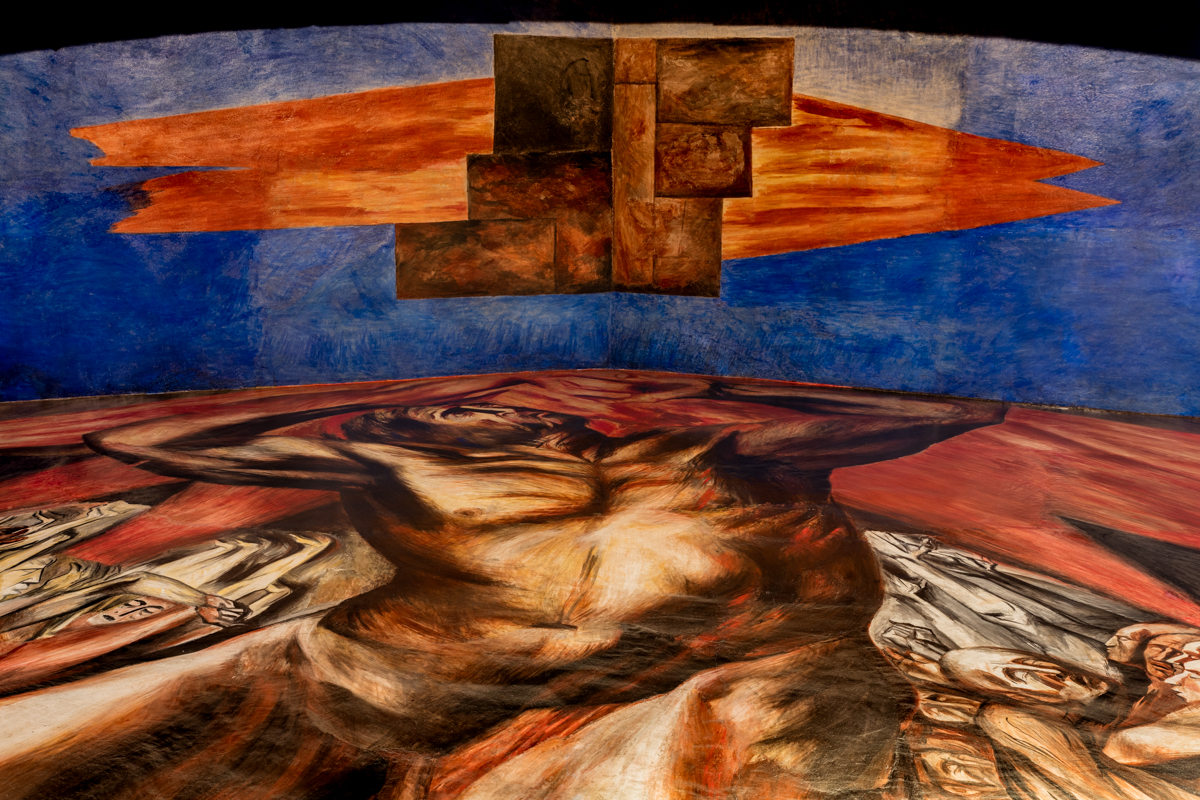
Overhead panel

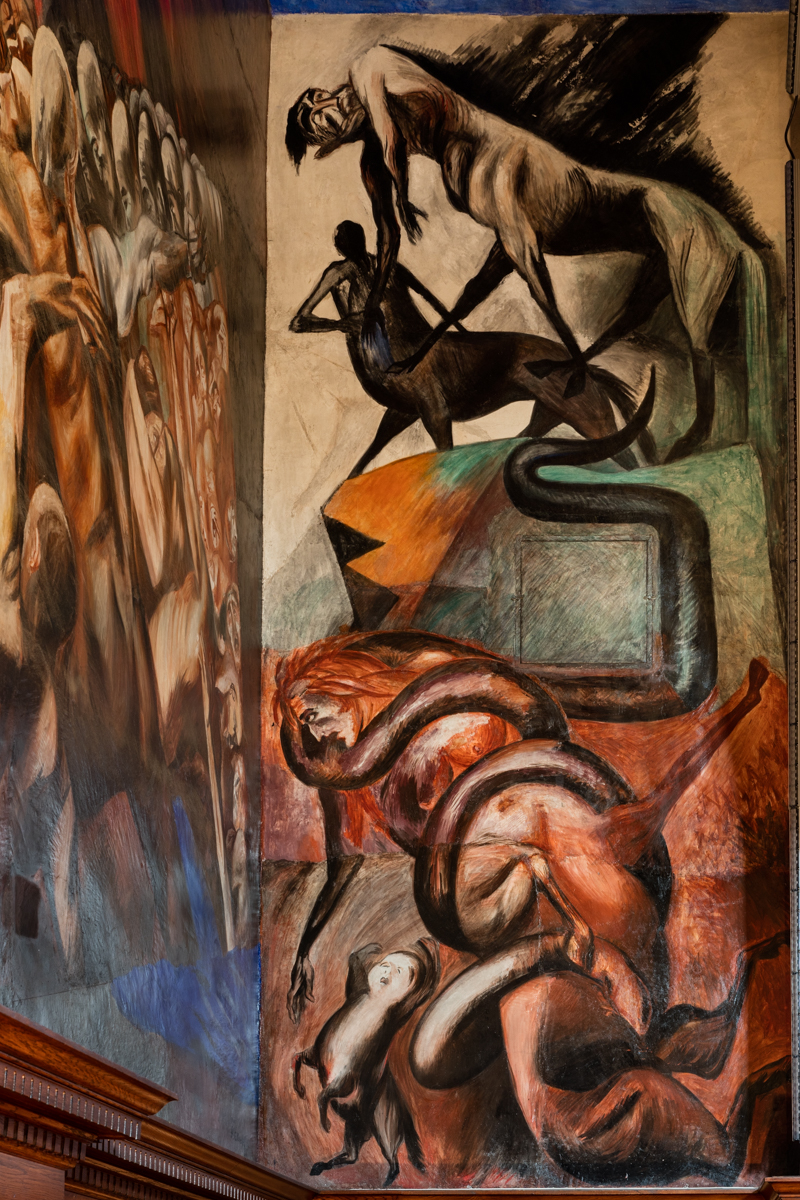
Right panel

== Production ==
The mural was commissioned in 1930 for Pomona's newly built neo-Gothic men's dining hall by its architect, Sumner Spaulding, and professor of art history and Hispanic studies José Pijoán. Journalist Alma Reed, a patron of Orozco's in New York, also helped the artist obtain the commission. Students helped to raise $300 of Orozco's artist fee of $2500 (equivalent to $48,000 in 2025).

Orozco stayed on campus for three months to complete the mural, living in a Clark dormitory, eating meals at Frary, and using students as models. He was assisted in the painting by Jorge Juan Crespo de la Serna, particularly with the side panels.

== Interpretation ==
Art historians generally interpret the mural to be a metaphor for the challenges often faced by those seeking to expand the realm of knowledge, particularly from conservative authority figures. The varying reactions of the crowd around Prometheus depicts that human development comes with both costs and benefits.

This theme connects to the mural's collegiate setting. It also had personal resonance for Orozco, who faced resistance throughout his life from those opposed to his leftist political views.

The subject of fire was of interest to him because of a fireworks accident in which he lost his left hand when he was 17.

== Reception and influence ==
External images
- 1930 banquet in Frary Dining Hall
- Empty Frary Dining Hall; Prometheus is visible in the background of both photos.

Prometheus received immediate critical acclaim upon completion. Los Angeles Times art critic Arthur Millier declared it a masterpiece, writing that Orozco "has energized that wall with his sublime conception of Prometheus bearing fire to cold, longing humanity until it lives as probably no wall in the United States lives today." He praised its "dynamic composition", describing it as "powerful beyond anything one can anticipate".

It was the first major work by a Mexican muralist in the United States, and helped Orozco, who was relatively unknown at the time, to subsequently land two other U.S. commissions, a mural room at The New School in New York City and The Epic of American Civilization at Dartmouth College in New Hampshire. He would later become known as one of the "big three" of the Mexican Mural Renaissance.

Prometheus heavily influenced abstract expressionist Jackson Pollock, who first visited the mural in the summer of 1930 and called it "the greatest painting in North America". Spaulding, Frary's architect, said "I feel as though the building would fall down if the fresco were removed."

Among contemporary students, it is often noted for its conspicuous lack of a penis; Orozco likely omitted it to avoid offending puritanical sensibilities. He attempted to add one when he visited Pomona several months after initially completing the mural, but it did not adhere properly to the wall.

== Preservation and restoration ==
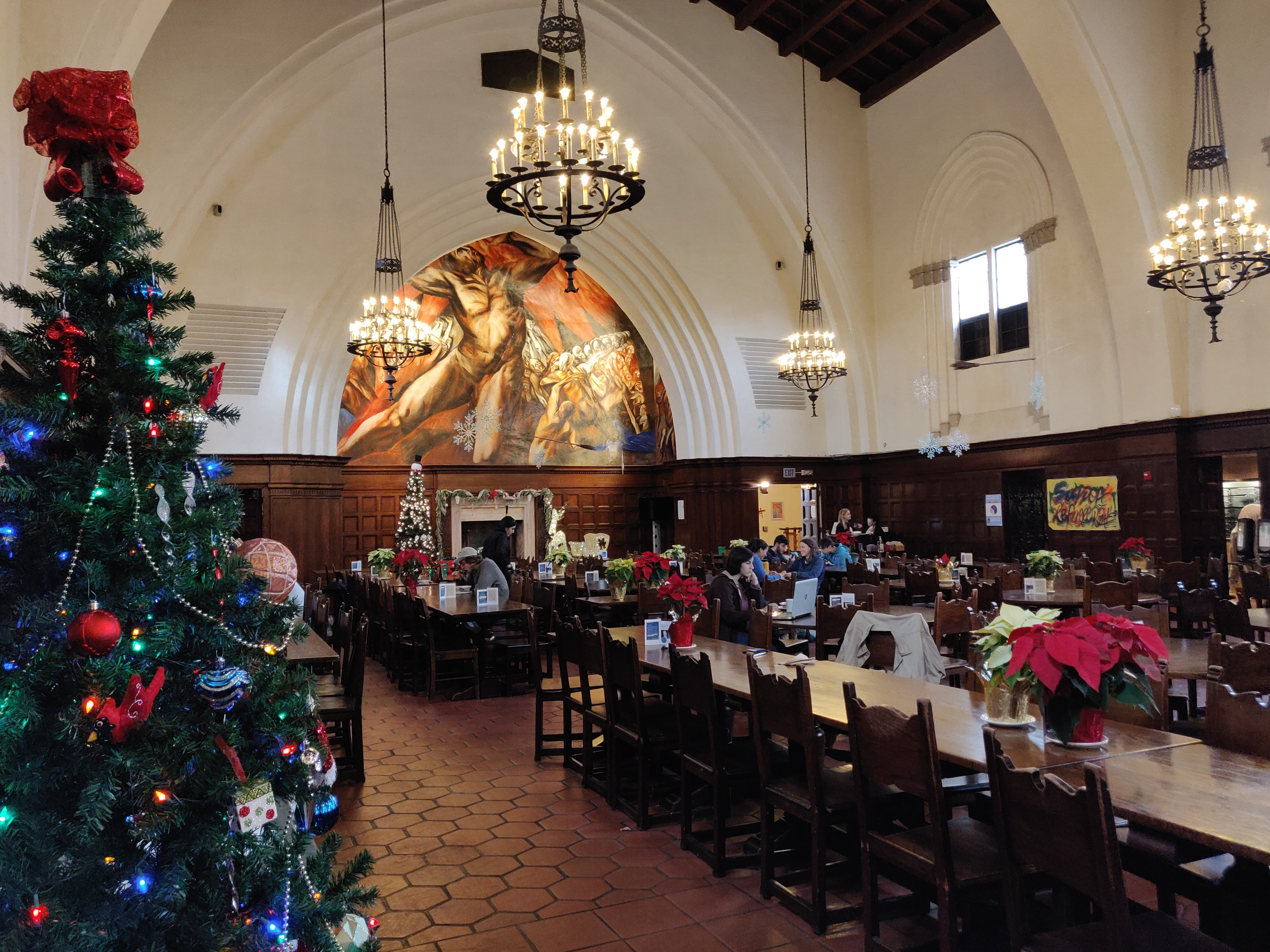
The Frary Dining Hall refectory in winter 2018 (view as a 360° interactive panorama)

Pomona has undertaken various preservation and restoration efforts over the years. In 1980, a protective varnish was applied over the mural. In 1982, structural damage was discovered in the wall behind the mural; it was subsequently reinforced. In 1995, it was restored after being damaged by vandals. In 2000, the college acquired preparatory drawings for the work from Orozco's relatives.

== See also ==
- Prometheus in popular culture
- 1930 in art

Public art at Pomona College

- Dividing the Light (Pomona College skyspace) by James Turrell, 2007
- Genesis by Rico Lebrun, 1960
- The Spirit of Spanish Music by Burt William Johnson, 1916
