= Corpo d'aria =

Artist's multiple by Piero Manzoni

Corpo d'Aria, 1960.

Corpo d'aria ("Body of Air"; plural Corpi d'aria) is an artist's multiple by the Italian artist Piero Manzoni. Manufactured between October 1959 and March 1960, the pieces are a box, a tripod base, a deflated balloon and a mouthpiece. 45 copies were made and sold at 30,000 lire each. Originally, any buyer could ask Manzoni to inflate the balloon himself, but would be charged an extra Deutschmark for every litre of air expanded. When fully expanded, the balloons measured 80 cm in diameter.

== Public presentation ==
The Corpi d'aria were first exhibited at the Galleria Azimut, run by Manzoni and his friend, the Italian artist Enrico Castellani, from May 3 to May 9, 1960. Manzoni organised an elaborate photo shoot and a short film to publicise the event. He was to write later in the year that the bodies had sold well.

By making a purely transient work, that would deflate before the buyer's eyes, Manzoni was parodying the traditional sculptural emphasis on permanence and mocking the traditional emphasis on the artist's creative force. He was also using modern materials to suggest an aggressively modern aesthetic whilst creating a poetic metaphor for the transience of life itself.

== Related works ==
=== Fiato d’artista ===
The most famous related work is the Fiato d’artista (Artist’s Breath), involving red, blue or white balloons inflated by Manzoni himself, closed with string and lead, with the name "Piero Manzoni" punched into it, then attached to a wooden base with a plaque on it using gesso. The pieces were made in 1960, and 11 examples are known to have survived, although all are now in an extreme state of decomposure. When exhibited now, the works inevitably assume the aura of a modern memento mori, featuring a rotting plastic membrane stuck to a polished wooden base, with a brass plaque commemorating the original act.

=== Placentarium ===
The largest variation on the theme was a giant double-skinned Placentarium, filled with compressed air to keep the balloon inflated. Manzoni designed especially for the projection of Otto Piene's Light Ballets, but also referred to the building housing a giant maze, made up of 60 cells controlled by "an electric brain". Equipped with 73 alcoves for viewers, the Placentarium was intended to be silver on the outside and white internally. Designs and a photograph of a small architectural model survive.

Manzoni simultaneously planned a series of public sculptures, of balloons 2.5 m diameter, to be installed in parks. These were to be fitted with air compressor to slowly pulsate ‘with a slow unsynchronized rhythm of breathing.’ He never took this idea further than a small experimental version.

The final experiment was for a sphere held suspended by a jet of air. Again, this never advanced beyond a small experimental maquette, but emphasises Manzoni's conception of balloons representing freedom and weightlessness.

== Influences ==
Manzoni is known to have been heavily influenced by Yves Klein, who had released 1001 blue balloons on the opening night of his "Proposition: Monochrome" exhibition at Iris Clert’s gallery, 1957.

Andy Warhol would later use balloons in a similar way, but filled with helium rather than suspended in a stream of compressed air. Indeed, his first balloon, made in 1965, corresponded to an unfulfilled project described by Manzoni in a letter as ‘a cluster of pneumatic cylinders, elongated in shape, like steel, which would vibrate in the blowing of the wind.’ Damien Hirst has used ping pong balls suspended in compressed air, but within the context of floating above a bed of sharp knives or a skeleton.

His most lasting influence, however, was on Arte Povera, a group of Italian artists, including Luciano Fabro and Alighiero e Boetti, who brought everyday materials into their work in a movement analogous to contemporary radical politics. (see Protests of 1968).

== See also ==
- Linee
- Artist's Shit
