= Monumental Head =

1960 bronze sculpture by Alberto Giacometti

- Tête Monumentale (French)
- Artist: Alberto Giacometti
- Year: 1960
- Catalogue: AGD 1003
- Medium: Bronze sculpture
- Movement: Abstract
- Subject: Roughly modeled head with a long neck
- Dimensions: 94 cm × 29.8 cm × 37.5 cm (37 in × 11.75 in × 14.75 in)
- Location: Hirshhorn Museum and Sculpture Garden, Washington, D.C.
- Owner: Smithsonian Institution
- Accession: 66.2042
- Followed by: L'Homme qui marche I

Monumental Head (French: Tête Monumentale) is a 1960 bronze sculpture by Alberto Giacometti, installed at the Hirshhorn Museum and Sculpture Garden in Washington, D.C., in the United States. The abstract work measures 37 x 11 3/4 x 14 3/4 inches and depicts a roughly modeled head with an extended neck. Other casts of Monumental Head from this period are found in the collections of other institutions, including the Phillips Collection and the Los Angeles County Museum of Art.

== See also ==
- 1960 in art
- List of public art in Washington, D.C., Ward 2
