= Prometheus in popular culture =

Appearances of mythological figure in cultural works

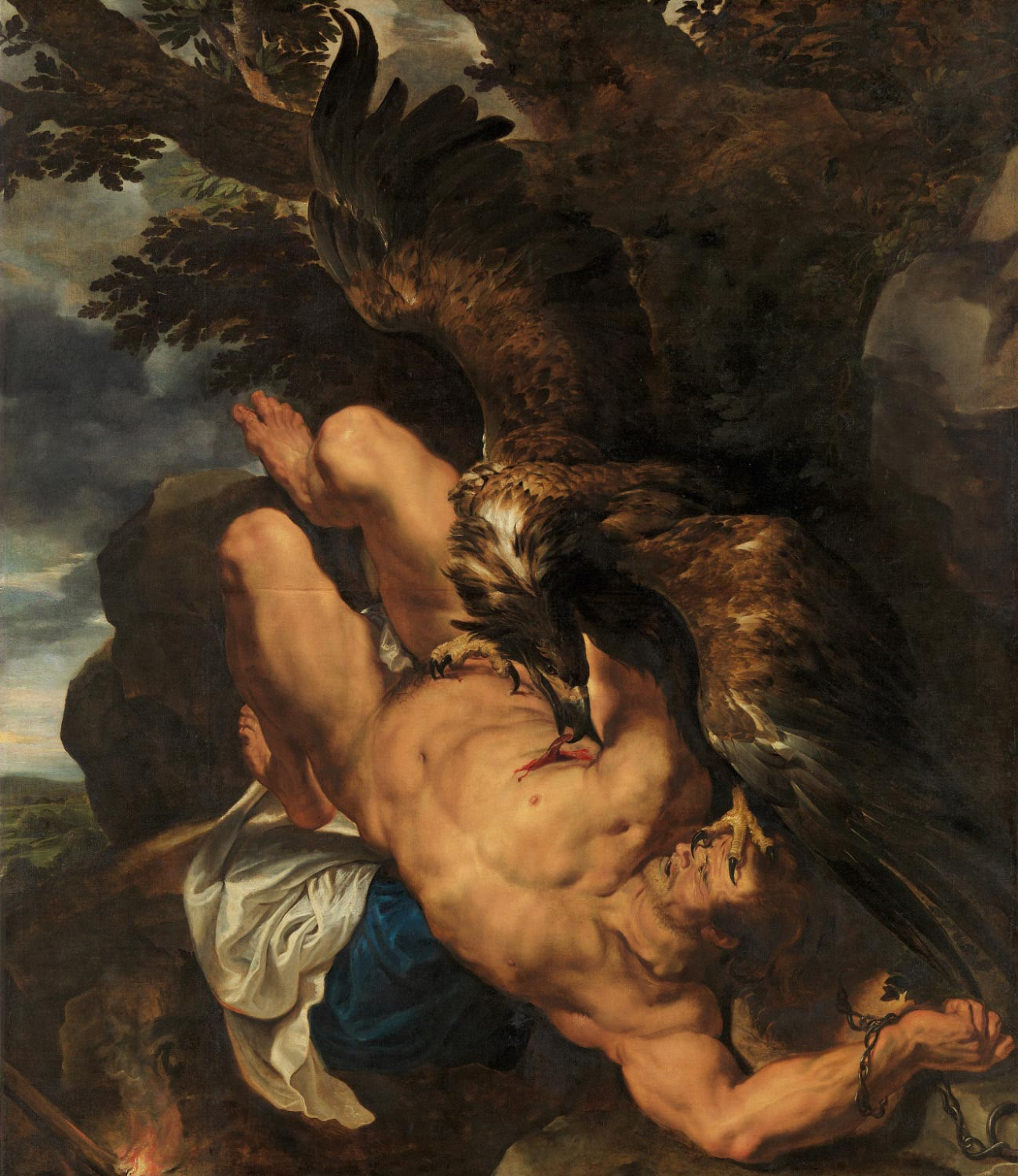
Chained Prometheus (1611–12), by Peter Paul Rubens

The figure and name of Prometheus from classical mythology has appeared in various art and literature.

== Cartoons and comics ==
- Soviet director Aleksandra Snezhko-Blotskaya created two cartoons in which Prometheus appears - The Return from Olympus (Возвращение с Олимпа, 1969) and Prometheus (Прометей, 1974), as part of her 5-film series about the Ancient Greek myths.
- Prometheus appears in an episode of Hercules: The Animated Series, where protagonist Hercules takes it upon himself to release Prometheus from his punishment, subsequently defending his decision to his father Zeus by arguing that humanity has proven themselves worthy of Prometheus' gift.
- An animated short aired on Nickelodeon Prometheus and Bob used the name to describe one of the main characters, an alien attempting to teach a primitive human different things about modern society and civilization.

== Film and television ==
- Prometheus appears as a character in an episode of the TV series eighth season of the TV series Supernatural, "Remember the Titans", now suffering from amnesia after an avalanche eight years prior to the episode. Here Prometheus's curse is portrayed as granting him a form of immortality; although no longer chained to the mountain, Prometheus still dies every day in various ways, ranging from being hit by a car to having a heart attack, with his seven-year-old son Oliver having 'inherited' his curse (Seven being the age at which the Greeks believed boys began to become men). Series protagonists Dean and Sam Winchester attempt to help Prometheus break his curse by summoning Zeus- reasoning that mankind owes Prometheus for giving them fire and the ability to stand against the dark- but in the end Prometheus is forced to sacrifice himself to kill Zeus with the aid of Artemis, thus sparing Oliver from having to endure his curse.
- Prometheus is the name of a space exploration ship and the title of a 2012 science-fiction film directed by Ridley Scott. The film's plot also involves an ancient alien race that were involved in the creation of human life.
- In the science fiction TV series Stargate SG-1, the Prometheus is humankind's first interstellar spacecraft – made possible with technology stolen from the Goa'uld, a parasitic race that enslaves humanity throughout the galaxy by posing as gods.
- The plot of the 2019 horror film The Lighthouse, directed by Robert Eggers, loosely resembles the myth of Prometheus.
- The animated film Promare is heavily based on the story to the point where various characters' names come from Greek terminology, the word 'Promare' coming from Prometheus, its plot revolving around fire, and callbacks to the mythos such ias Fennel Volcano. This would later be confirmed by staff in interviews.
- Prometheus is a major character in the British mythological black comedy series Kaos, with the character also functioning as the series narrator throughout.

== Gaming ==
- In Portal 2, the tale of Prometheus is used by the oracle turret to foreshadow future events in the game. It recounts how Prometheus was cast into the depths of the earth and pecked by birds. Later, the antagonist/anti-hero GLaDOS is cast into the deepest levels of the Aperture Science facility and is pecked by a bird.
- The game BioShock's 12th level is called Point Prometheus.
- In the game God of War II, the protagonist Kratos encounters and frees Prometheus from his eternal torment, in turn gaining the power of the Titans.
- In the game Destiny 2, there is a weapon obtainable from exotic engrams in world drops throughout the various maps called Prometheus Lens. A powerful trace rifle added in the Curse of Osiris DLC expansion.
- In Borderlands 3, there is a planet with metropolis-like city called Promethea.
- In the Mass Effect game series, the 'Protheans' are an extinct ancient race that are believed to have built the Citadel and mass relays present in the game's lore and known to have uplifted several younger races. Their ruins are the original source of all mass effect and FTL technology for the younger races. Some people believe the species name sounds similar to Prometheus.
- Godfire: Rise of Prometheus is a mobile game in which the player character, Prometheus steals an artifact called the "Spark of Godfire" from Helios with the help of Aphrodite. It features numerous Greek monsters, including the Minotaur, Cyclops, Lamia, and Scylla.
- In Persona 2: Eternal Punishment, Prometheus is Baofu's ultimate Persona.
- In Persona 5, Persona Q2: New Cinema Labyrinth, and Persona 5 Royal, Prometheus is Futaba Sakura’s ultimate Persona.
- In Chrono Trigger, Prometheus is Robo's real name, as revealed by Atropos in Geno Dome.
- Prometheus appears in Immortals: Fenyx Rising as a story narrator alongside Zeus.
- In Hades II, Prometheus appears as the boss encounter of the Mount Olympus region. When Chronos launched his war against the Gods, Prometheus foresaw his victory and allied with him.
- In The Talos Principle 2, Prometheus is one of the three Greek mythologic entities that appears and influence the player choices by representing the voice of progress and advance of humankind.

== Magazines ==
- The Eulenspiegel Society began the magazine Prometheus in the early 1970s; it is a decades-long-running magazine exploring issues important to kinksters, ranging from art and erotica, to advice columns and personal ads, to conversation about the philosophy of consensual kink. The magazine now exists online.

== Music ==
- The Norwegian symphonic black metal band Emperor released, in 2001, an album entitled "Prometheus: The Discipline of Fire & Demise".
- The American Metalcore band Trivium pointed out similarities of the crucifixion of Jesus Christ, and Prometheus' torment of being eternally tortured in their song "Of Prometheus and The Crucifix".
- The American punk band The Menzingers mention Prometheus in their song "Sir Yes Sir".

== Novels/Short stories ==
- Prometheus appears in The Last Olympian by Rick Riordan, where he is a diplomat of the antagonistic Titan Army.
- "Frankenstein; or, The Modern Prometheus" is the title of the 1818 novel written by Mary Shelley.
- The spaceship in Arthur C. Clarke's Summertime on Icarus is called 'Prometheus'.
- The biography American Prometheus: The Triumph and Tragedy of J. Robert Oppenheimer references the Prometheus myth as a parallel to the Manhattan Project and the development of the atomic bomb. The biography served as inspiration for the 2023 film Oppenheimer.

== Paintings ==
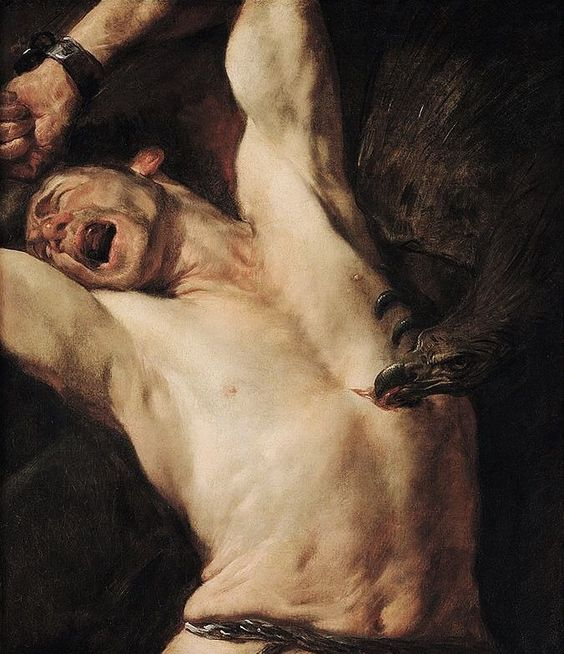
The Torture of Prometheus by Gioacchino Assereto (1620–48)

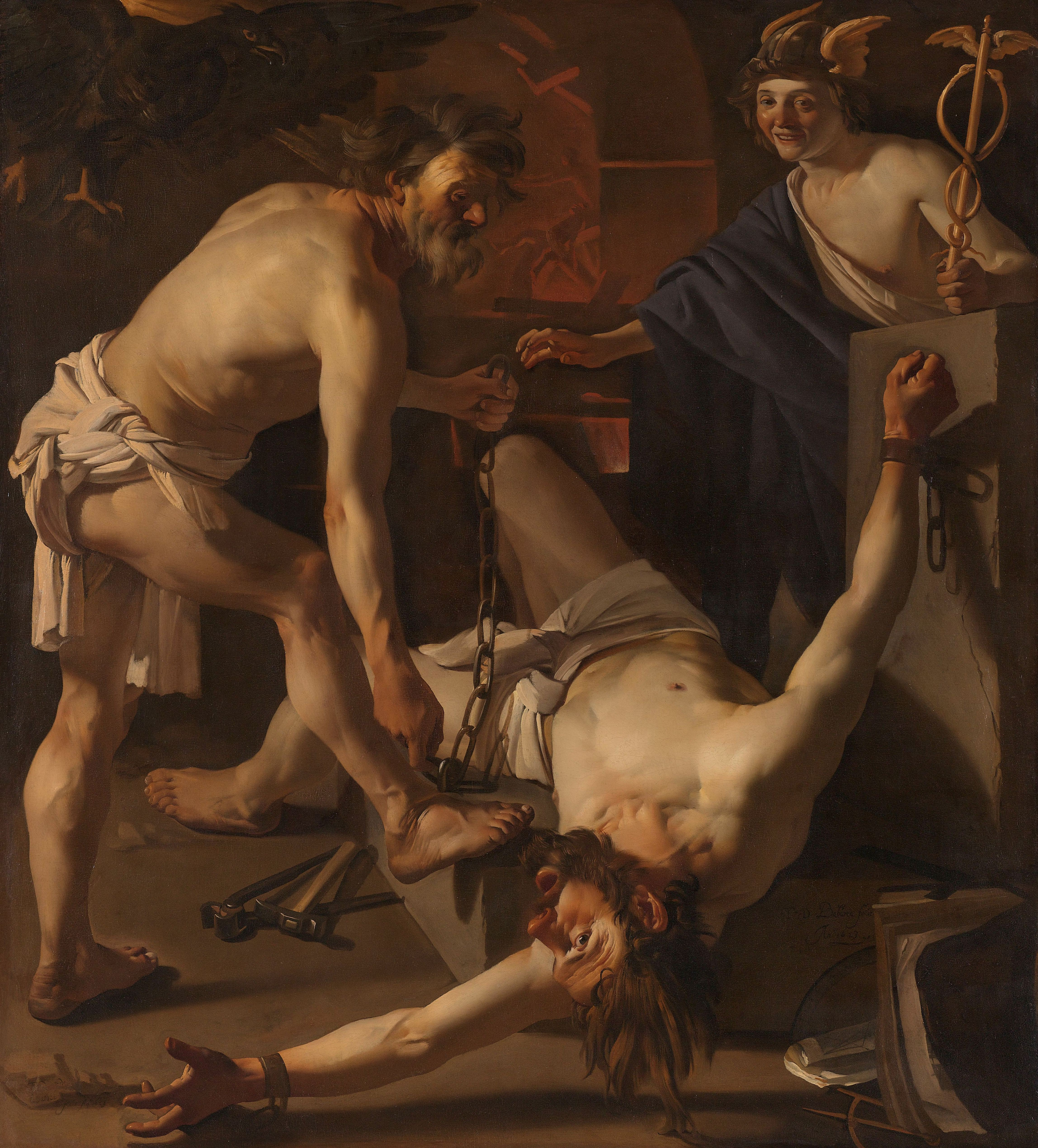
Prometheus Being Chained by Vulcan by Dirck van Baburen (1623)

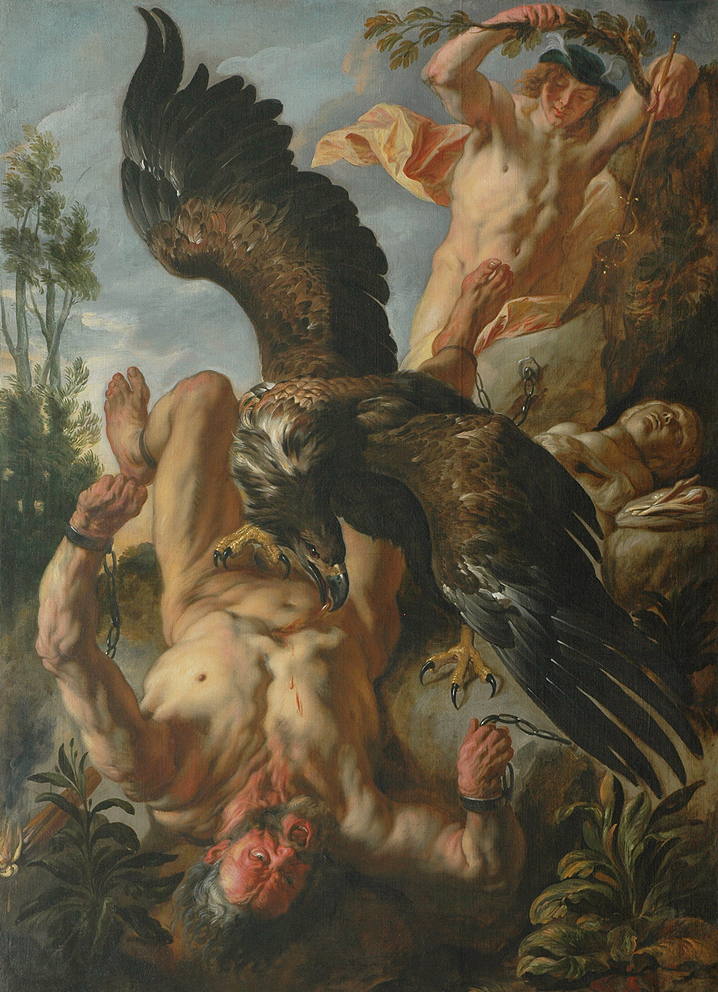
Chained Prometheus by Jacob Jordaens (1640)

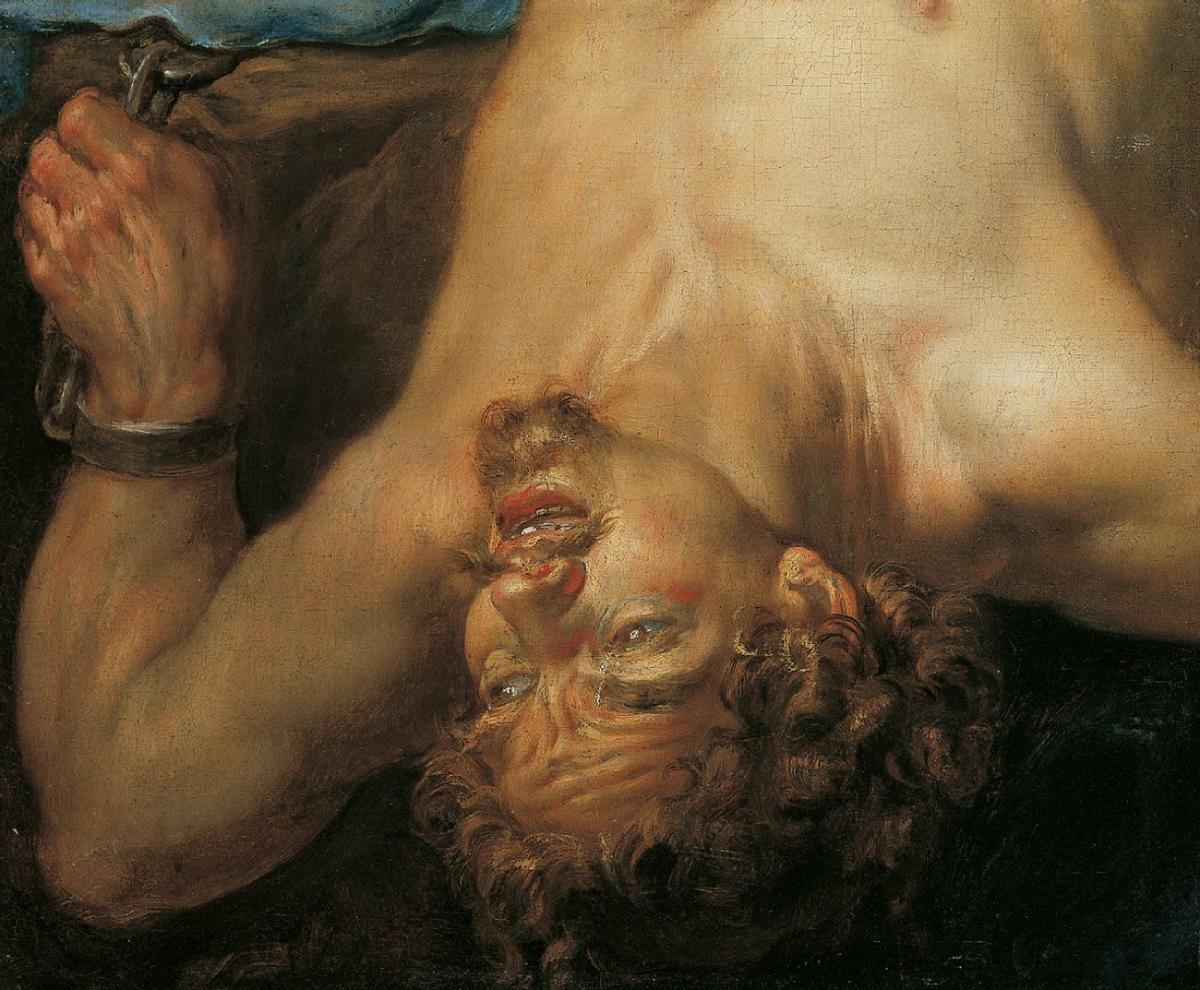
Chained Prometheus by Jacques de l'Ange (1640/50)

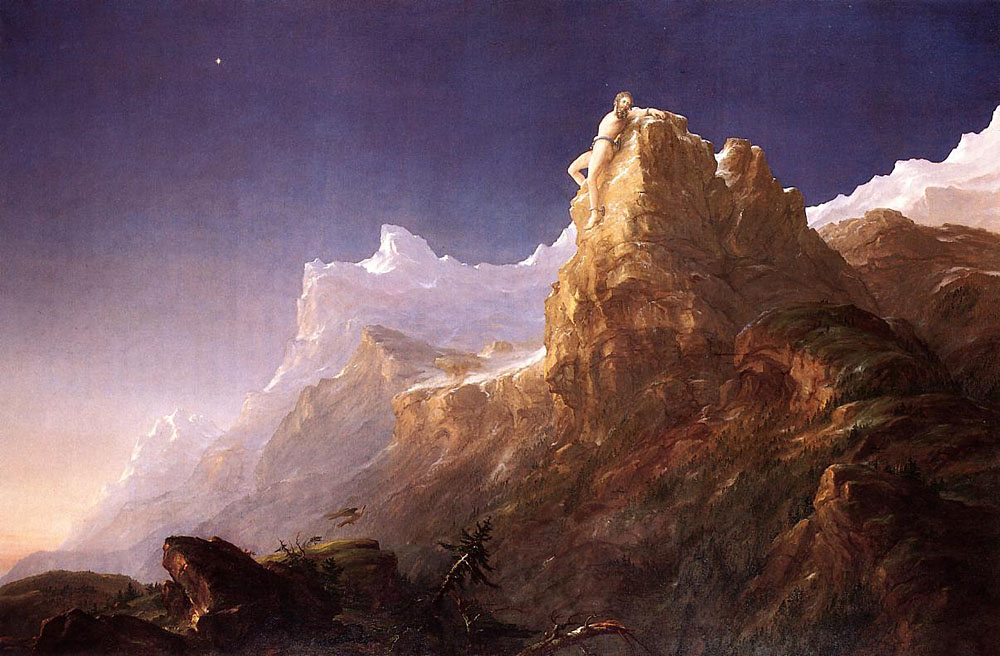
Prometheus Bound by Thomas Cole (1847)

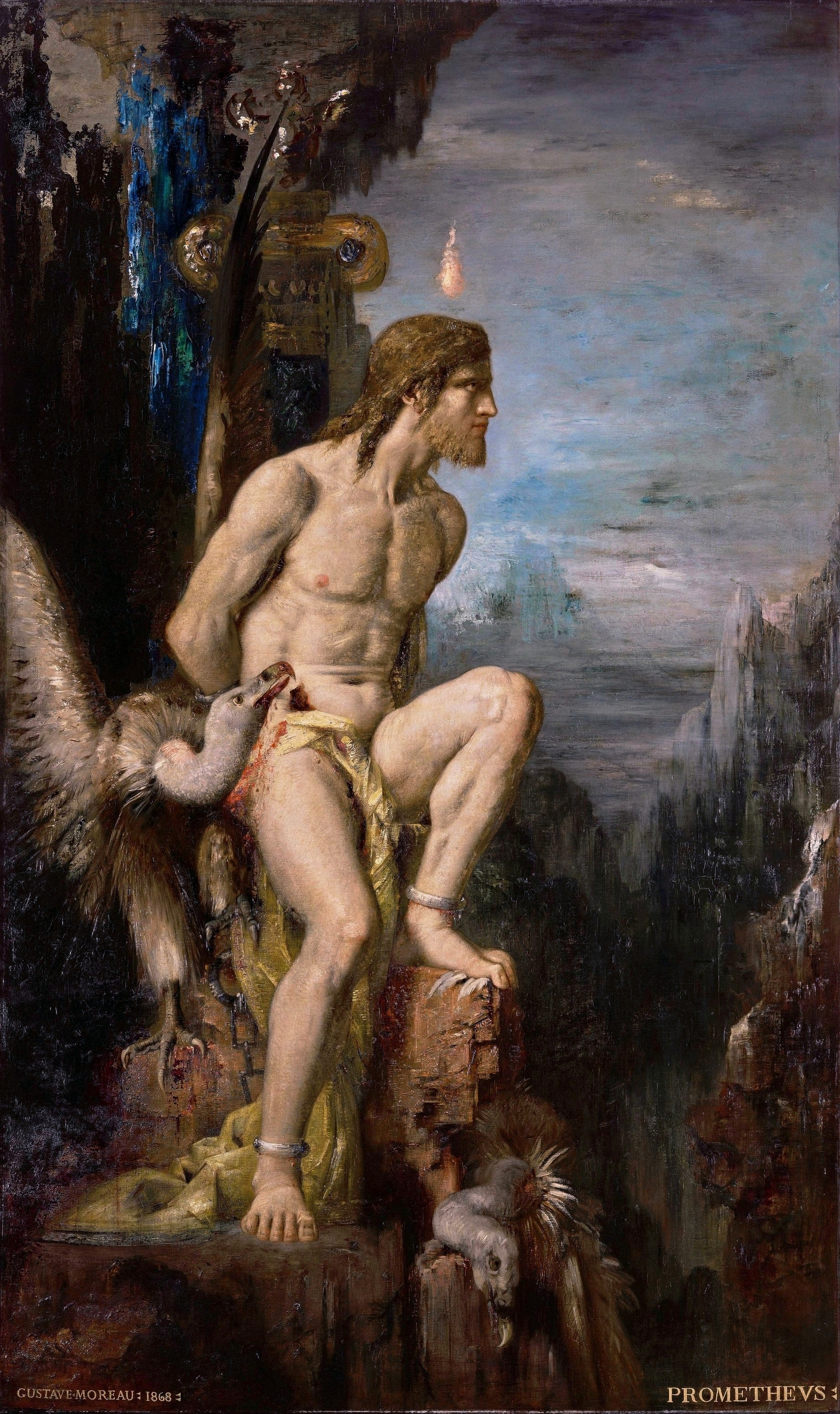
Prometheus by Gustave Moreau (1868)

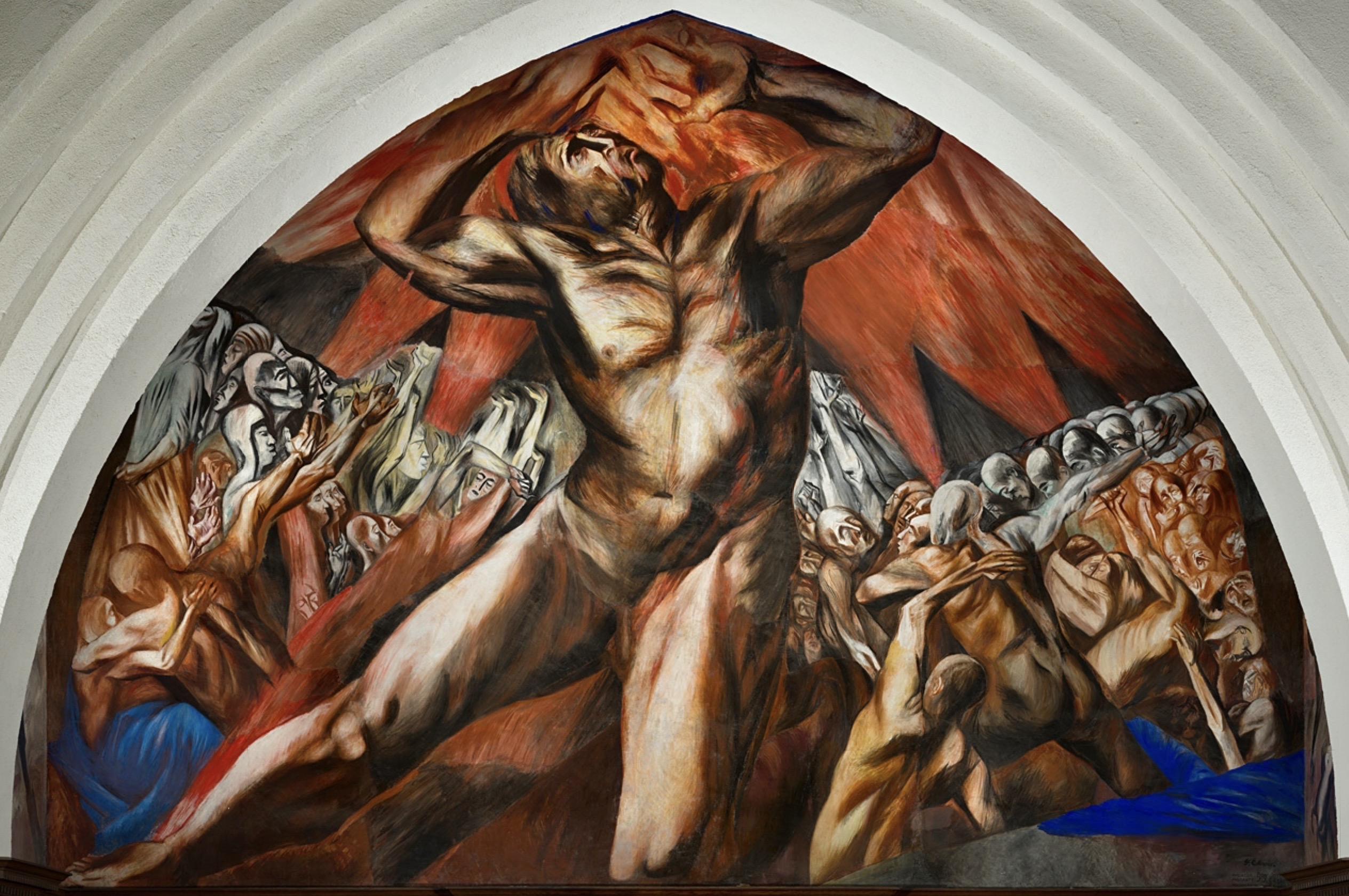
Prometheus by José Clemente Orozco (1930)

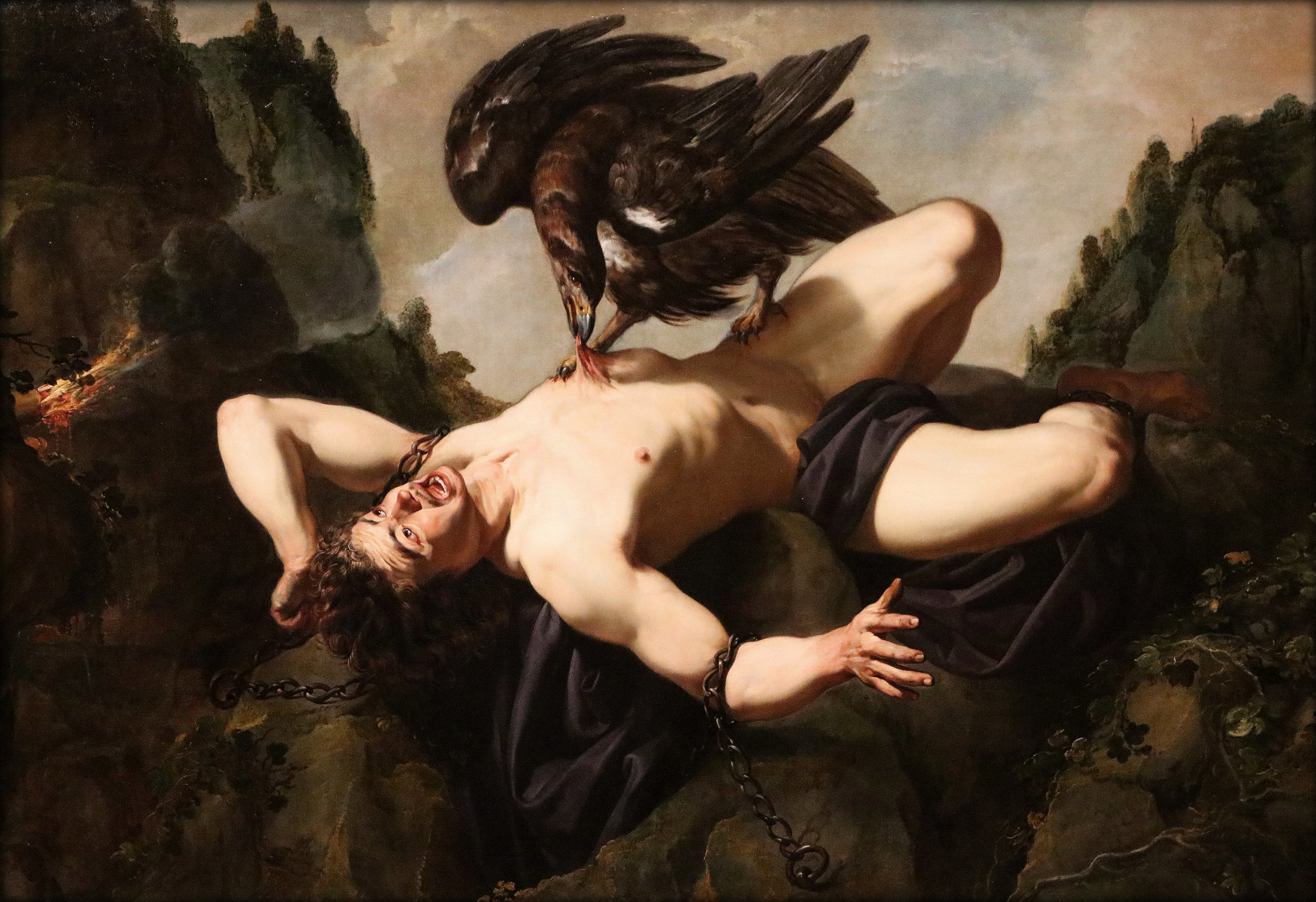
Prometheus by Theodoor Rombouts (1597–1637)

== Sculptures ==
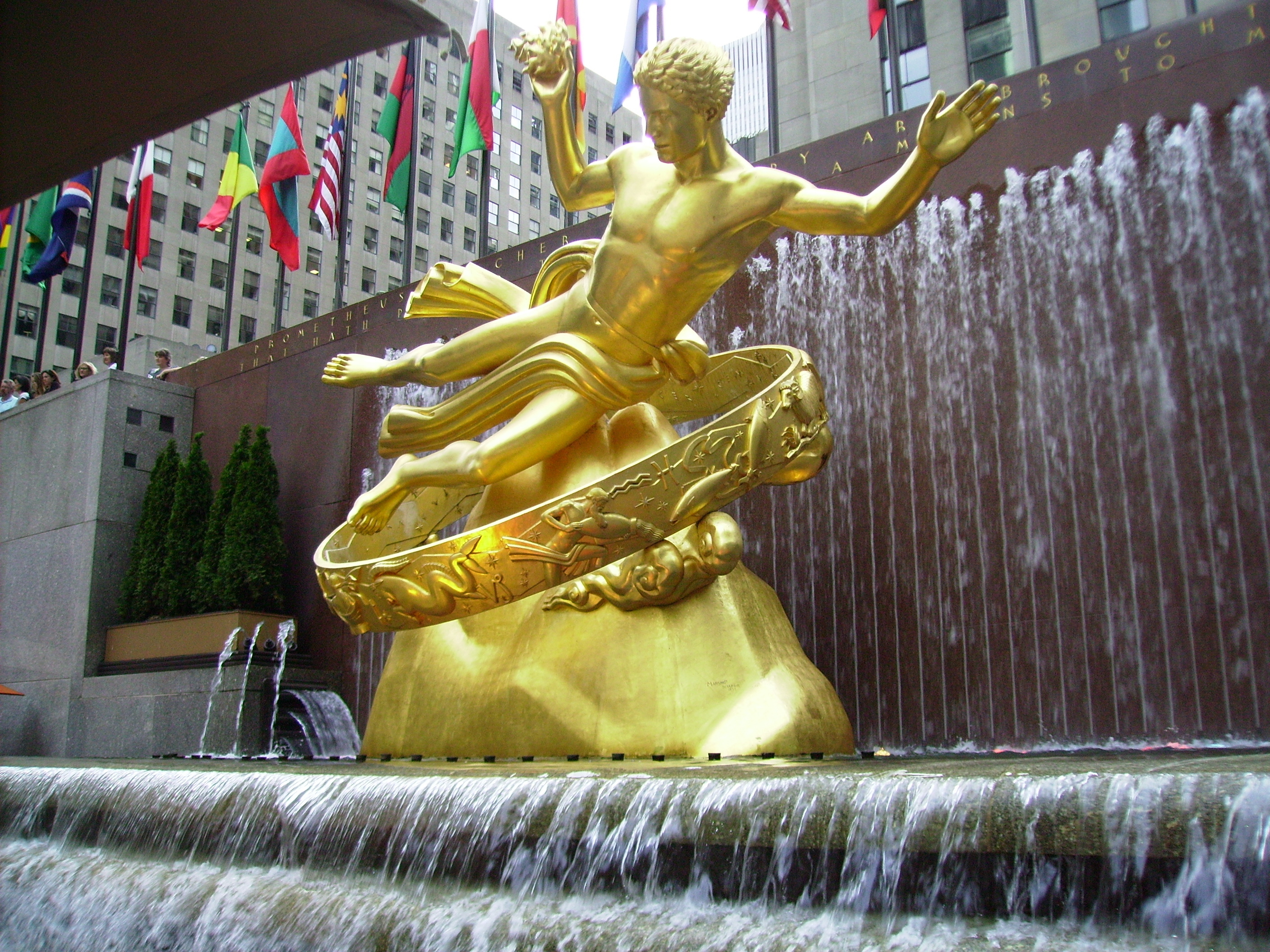
Prometheus by Paul Manship, 1933 (Rockefeller Center)

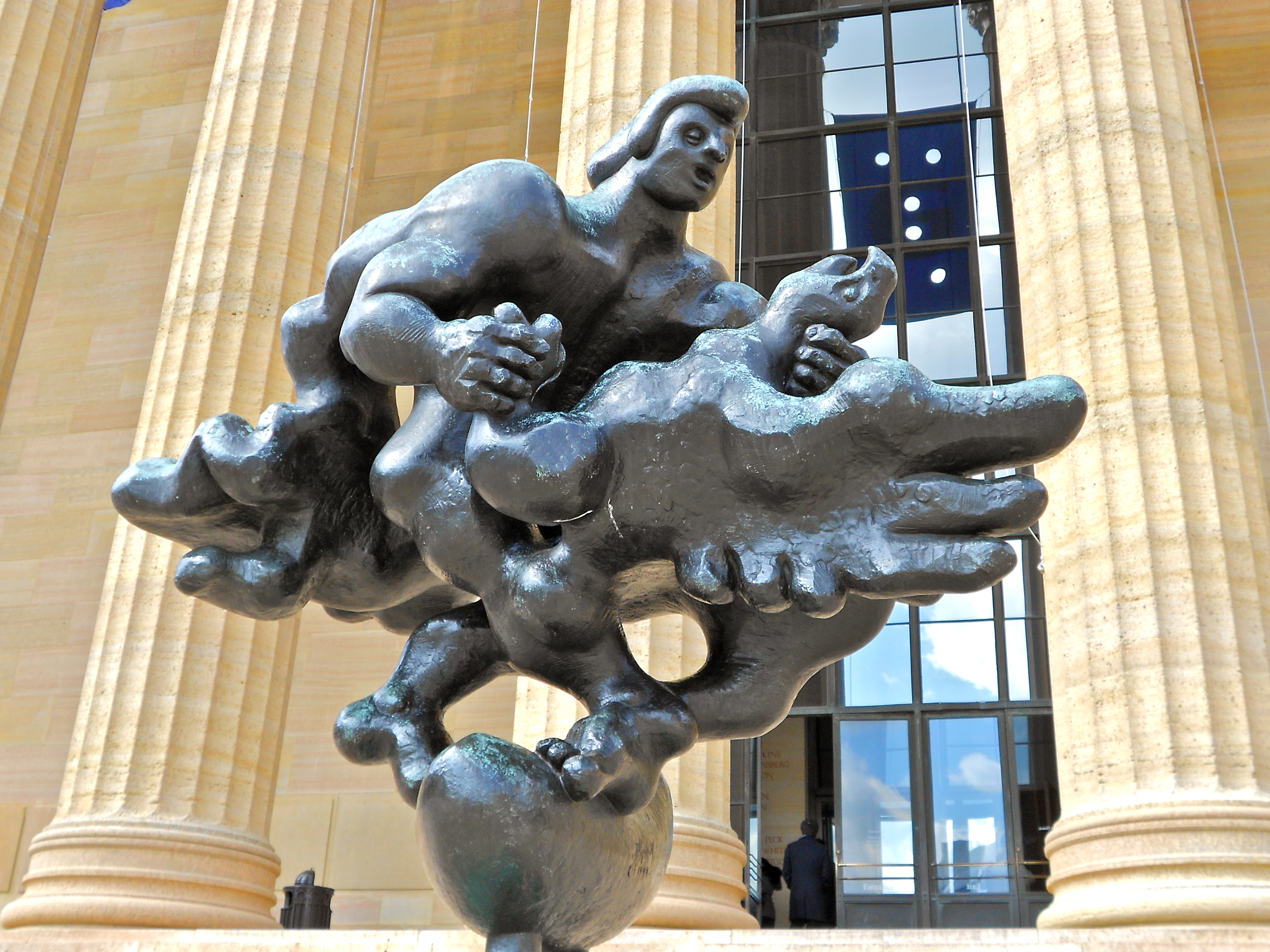
Jacques Lipchitz, 1943 (Philadelphia Museum of Art)

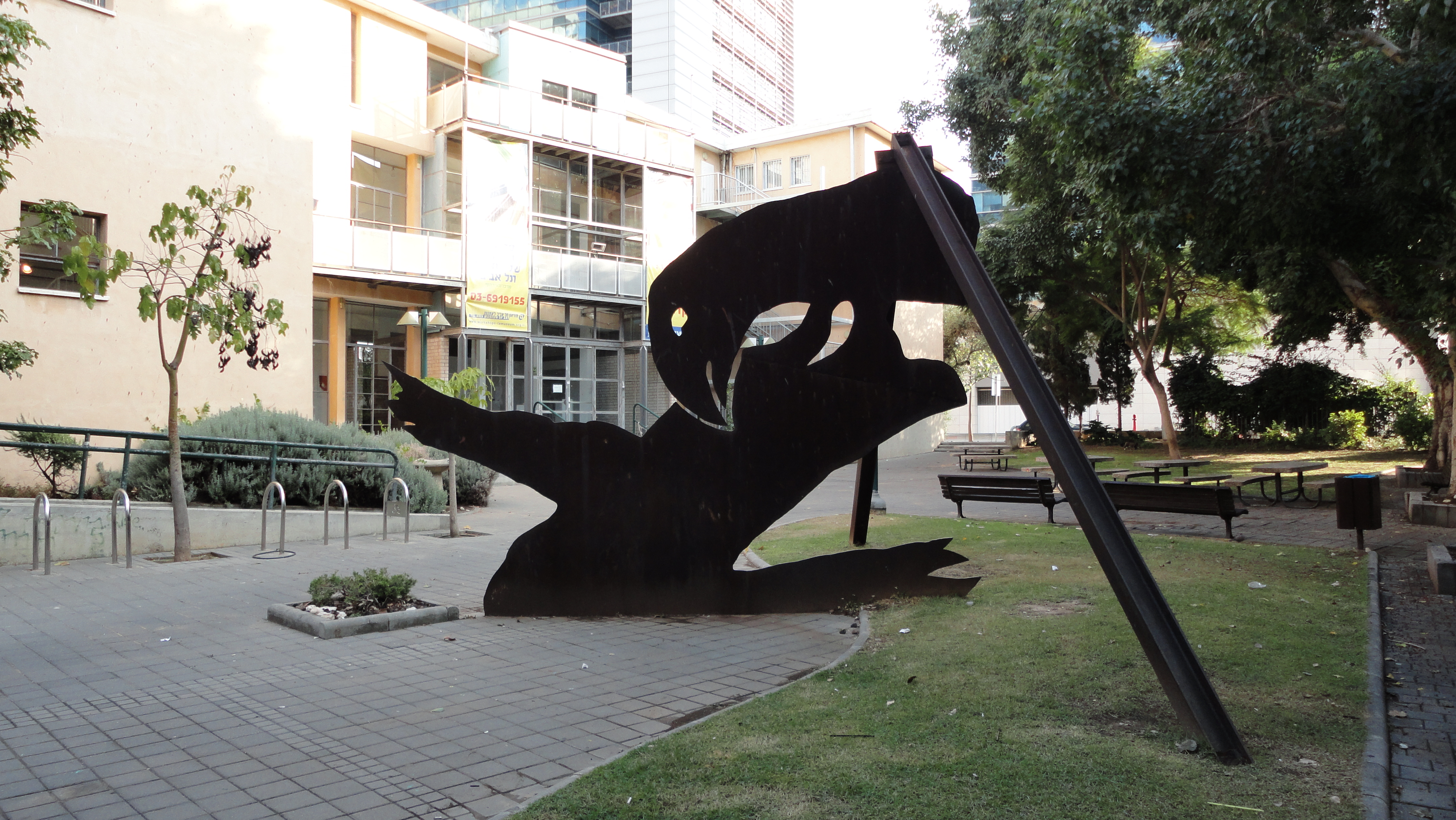
Menashe Kadishman, 1980–87 (Meyerhoff Art Education Center, Tel Aviv)

== Science ==
The myth of Prometheus, with its theme of invention and discovery, has been used in science-related names and as a metaphor for scientific progress.

- The cloned horse Prometea, and Prometheus, a moon of Saturn, are named after this Titan, as is the asteroid 1809 Prometheus.
- The name of the sixty-first element, promethium, is derived from Prometheus.
- The Prometheus Society is a High IQ society. The name of its magazine, Gift of Fire, is explained by the ancient association of fire with mental gifts.
- Prometheus Books, a publishing company for scientific, educational, and popular books, especially those relating to secular humanism or scientific skepticism, takes its name from the myth.
- The Prometheus Award is given by the Libertarian Futurist Society for Libertarian science fiction.
- In 1983 Robert Anton Wilson published a non-fiction book called Prometheus Rising (which was followed by Quantum Psychology)
- Scientific and medical literature about liver regeneration often alludes to Prometheus and the devouring and daily regrowth of his liver. Some think the myth even indicates that the ancient Greeks knew about the liver’s remarkable capacity for self-repair. The Greek word for liver, hēpar, hepat- (ἧπαρ, cf. English "hepatitis", "hepatology", etc.) is derived from the verb hēpaomai (ἠπάομαι), meaning "mend, repair". While others doubt the significance to Greek medical knowledge, Prometheus's name is associated with biomedical companies involved in regenerative medicine.
- The emblem of the National Technical University of Athens depicts "Prometheus the fire-bringer" (Προμηθεύς Πυροφόρος).

== Military ==
A Russian air defense system called S-500 missile system is named after Prometheus

== See also ==
- Olympic flame
- Prometheism, a political project in Poland named for Prometheus.
