= Bison (sculpture) =

Sculpture in Eugene, Oregon, U.S.

- The sculpture in 2015
- Artist: Unknown
- Year: c. 1960
- Type: Sculpture
- Medium: Stone
- Subject: American bison
- Dimensions: 57 cm × 41 cm × 71 cm (22.5 in × 16 in × 28 in)
- Condition: "Treatment urgent" (1994)
- Location: Eugene, Oregon, United States; 44.0469°N 123.07533°W
- Owner: University of Oregon

Bison is an outdoor c. 1960 stone sculpture of an American bison by an unknown artist, installed at the west entrance to the courtyard of Lawrence Hall on the University of Oregon campus in Eugene, Oregon, in the United States.

== Description and history ==
The Bison measures approximately 22.5 inches (0.57 m) long, 16 inches (0.41 m) wide, and 28 inches (0.71 m) tall. The statue rests on a brick base that measures approximately 15 inches (0.38 m) wide, 20.5 metres (67 ft) long, and 42 inches (1.1 m) tall. The work was surveyed and deemed "treatment urgent" by the Smithsonian Institution's "Save Outdoor Sculpture!" program in 1994. It is administered by the University of Oregon.

== See also ==
- 1960 in art
