= Genesis (Lebrun) =

1960 mural by Rico Lebrun

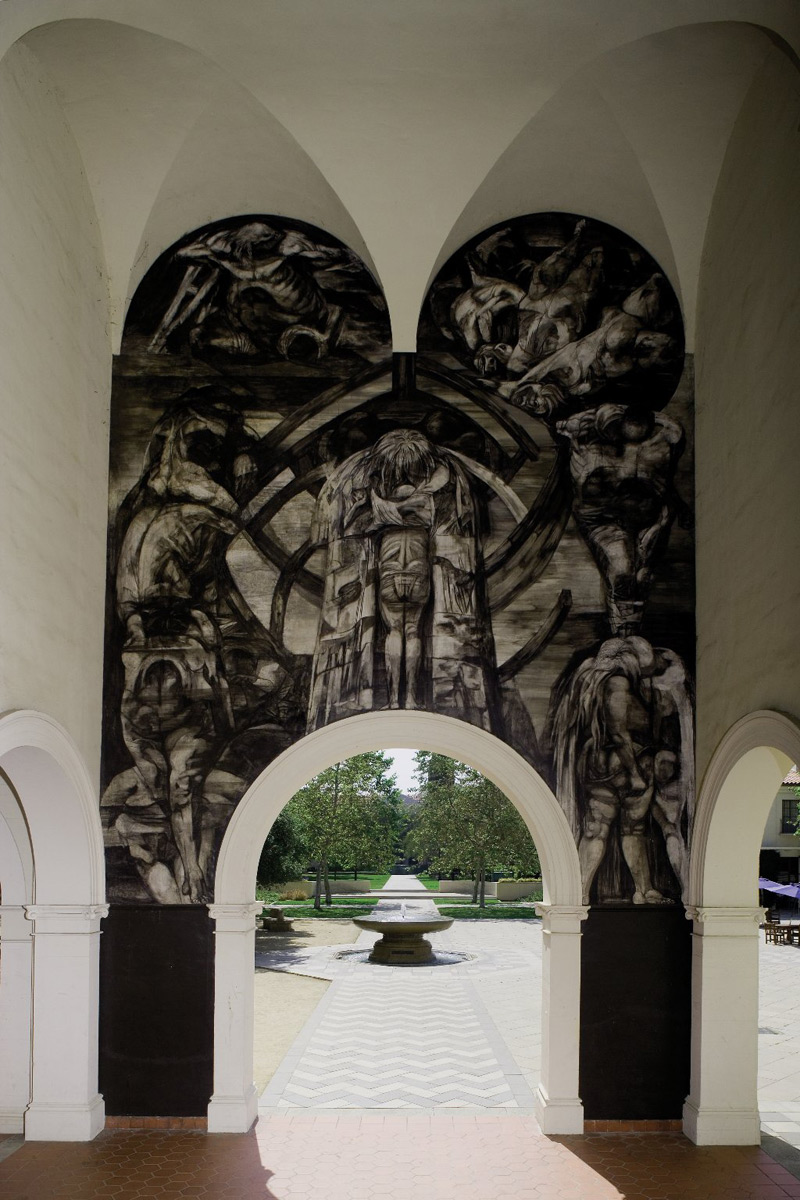
- Artist: Rico Lebrun
- Year: 1960
- Medium: Black polyvinyl acetone on gypsum plaster
- Dimensions: 880 cm × 760 cm (29 feet × 25 feet)
- Location: Frary Dining Hall, Pomona College; Claremont

Genesis is a mural by Italian-American painter and sculptor Rico Lebrun depicting the suffering that humankind experiences in the Book of Genesis. It was commissioned by Pomona College and completed in 1960. It is located on the south entrance of Frary Dining Hall.

== Description ==
The mural is on the interior wall of the south entrance of Frary Dining Hall at Pomona College. The central figure is Noah sheltering a child, while being surrounded by representations of Adam and Eve, Cain and Abel, the Genesis flood, Job, and Sodom and Gomorrah. Lebrun's concept was to depict "the evolution of form," and he discussed "half-borrowing and half-inventing organic fragments, skulls, sections of backbones, sections of ribcages, roots of plants, geological formations ... to weld some kind of design which would put across the becoming of form."

== Development ==
In November 1956, Lebrun visited Pomona in preparation for a solo exhibition for his work at its art gallery organized by Peter Selz. He admired José Clemente Orozco's fresco Prometheus in Frary and expressed an interest in painting a work in conversation with it.

Selz pursued a commission for Lebrun, and secured a donation from Donald and Elizabeth Winston. The project stalled, however, after the Pomona Board of Trustees suggested that Lebrun submit sketches to the college's Buildings and Grounds Committee for approval, which he—along with Selz and the Winstons—viewed as a violation of his artistic freedom. The board relented and the commission was approved in October 1958.

Lebrun worked on sketches for the mural during a residency at the American Academy in Rome, during which time architect John Rex prepared a curtain wall for the work. Lebrun arrived at Pomona in July 1960, bringing drawings that occupied most of the tables of Frary. After redesigns, he began to paint in September, assisted by Bill Ptaszynski and Jim Pinto. He finished the work in December 1960.

== Reception ==
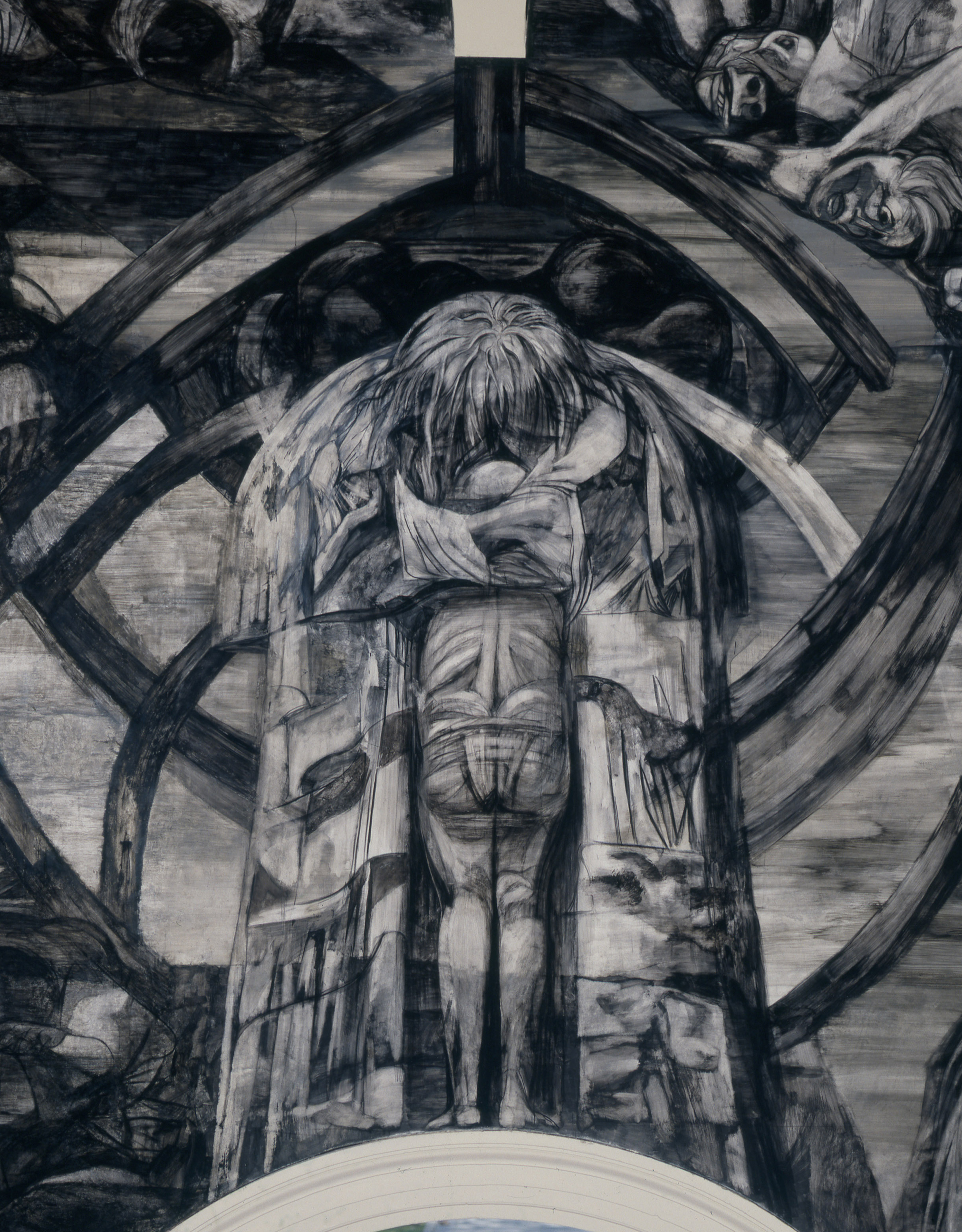
Detail of Noah in Genesis

Genesis was met with critical acclaim. Seldon Rodman wrote in The New York Times that it was "the most ambitious mural painting north of the Rio Grande". Lebrun wrote that it was "the best and most conclusive work I have painted to date". Leonard Baskin, referencing Prometheus, wrote, "José Clemente can rest in peace. Hallowed ground has not been despoiled."

Genesis is noted for its divergence from many of the artistic trends popular at the time. Its serious subject matter sets it apart from the more decorative works then popular in the region. It is an example of a figurative work, contrasting with the abstract expressionism then in vogue. Lastly, its religious themes contrast with the increasing secularization of postwar America; Selz described it as "a religious painting created during a non-religious age".

== See also ==
- 1960 in art

Public art at Pomona College

- Dividing the Light (Pomona College skyspace) by James Turrell, 2007
- Prometheus by José Clemente Orozco, 1930
- The Spirit of Spanish Music by Burt William Johnson, 1916
