= The Epic of American Civilization =

Mural by José Clemente Orozco

- U.S. National Register of Historic Places
- U.S. National Historic Landmark
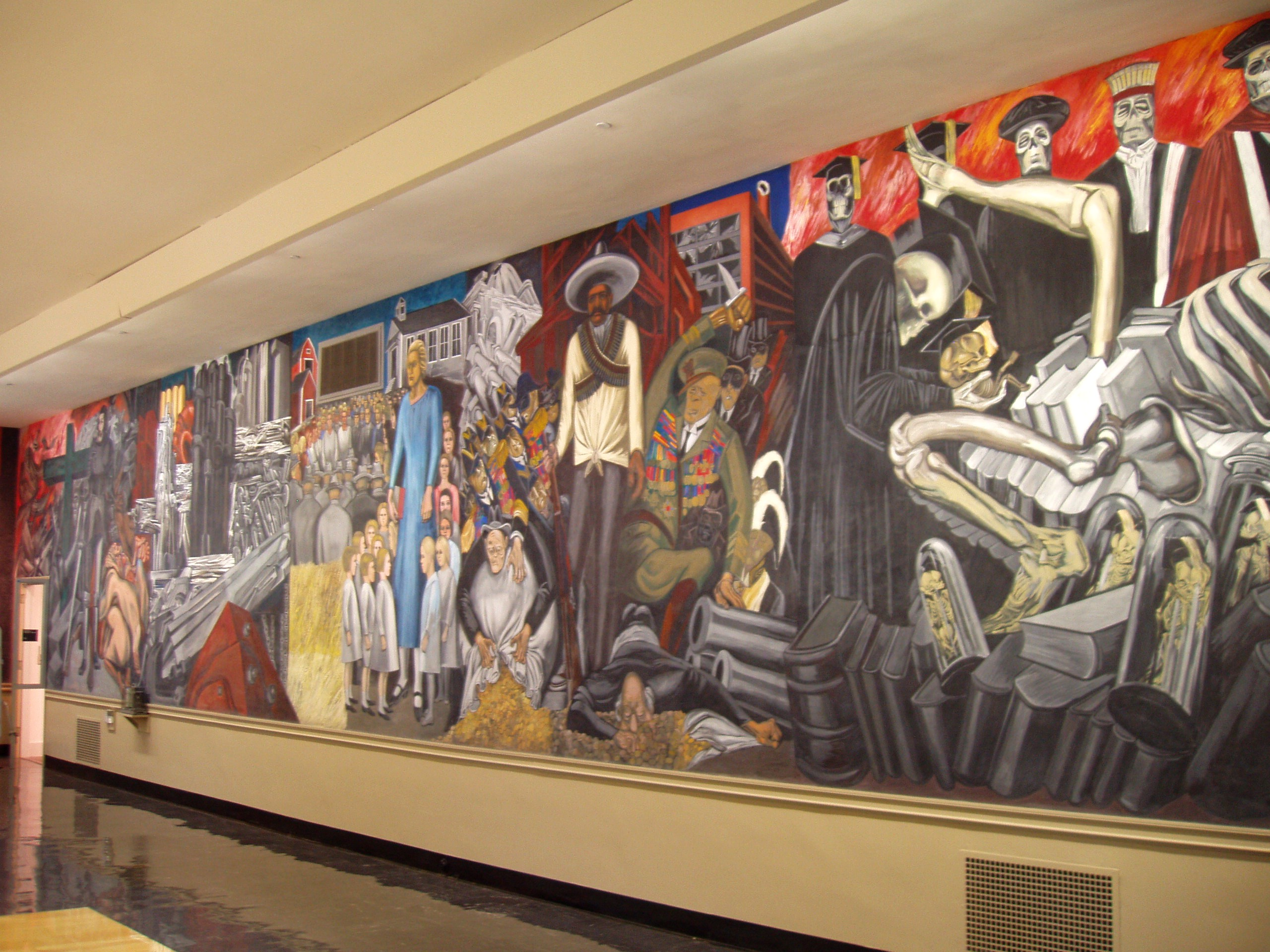

- Location within New Hampshire Location within the United States
- Location: Baker Memorial Library, Dartmouth College, Hanover, New Hampshire
- Coordinates: 43°42′18″N 72°17′21″W
- Built: 1932
- NRHP reference No.: 13000283
- Added to NRHP: February 27, 2013

The Epic of American Civilization is a mural by the social realist painter José Clemente Orozco. It is located in the basement reading room of the Baker Memorial Library on the campus of Dartmouth College in Hanover, New Hampshire. The mural, painted between 1932 and 1934, consists of a series of 24 fresco panels, whose principal themes are the impact of both indigenous Native Americans and European colonists on North America, and the impact of war (particularly the Mexican Civil War and the First World War) and rapid industrialization on the human spirit. The mural was designated a National Historic Landmark in 2013.

Orozco painted the mural during the same time his fellow muralist, Diego Rivera, was working on his murals at the Rockefeller Center in New York. But while Rivera's portrait of Lenin led to his mural being painted over, Orozco was given full political freedom to paint as he chose. His images offended a group of Dartmouth parents who called themselves the Boston Mothers. "We would be everlastingly grateful to you," the mothers wrote to college president Ernest Hopkins, "if the pictures could be destroyed." Another letter to Hopkins was more blunt: "Orozco has shouted forth in paint the Communist Manifesto!"

But Hopkins, a lifelong Republican, defended Orozco's right to paint as he chose. "There are 100% Americans who have objected to the fact that we employed a Mexican to do this work," Hopkins wrote to the mothers, "but I have never believed that art could be made either racial or national." Responding to concerns that Orozco's imagery was not "nice", Hopkins wrote, "if that be a criterion of judgment many of the great works of the medieval masters would have to be removed from the Louvre."

In addition to the letter writing campaign, four satirical murals were painted as a direct response to the Orozco murals from 1938 to 1939 in the basement of the Class of 1953 Commons. This second set of murals depicts the foundation of Dartmouth College, and caricatures of Native Americans, including those related to education and alcohol. This second set of murals were moved off-site to an art storage facility in 2018.

== Background ==
The mural was one of Orozco's last major works in the United States, following Prometheus at Pomona College in Southern California and a mural cycle at The New School in Manhattan. Orozco's last major work in the United States may have been his "Dive Bomber and Tank" fresco, which he created at New York City's Museum of Modern Art in 1940. https://www.moma.org/collection/works/80681

== The Coming and Departure of Quetzalcoatl ==
The two themes of the mural are arranged in separate wings of the reading room. The west wing contains ten panels on the first theme, that of Native Americans.

Migration

This panel is located on the short western wall, to the left of the doors. It depicts the arrival of natives as a grim march, echoing the industrially-oriented panel at the far eastern end of the room.

Snake and Spears

Located over the western doors, this panel shows a rattlesnake flanked by spears. Its color palette suggests it was painted when Orozco worked on the eastern panels.

Ancient Human Sacrifice

This panel, to the right of the western doors, depicts human sacrifice as practiced by ancient Mesoamericans, in which the living heart is removed from the sacrificial victim. The panel has an analog (as the first one does) on the opposite wall of the east wing.

Aztec Warriors

This and the next four panels are on the north wall of the west wing. This one depicts Aztec warriors wearing eagle and jaguar costumes, and includes a representation of the head of the plumed serpent god Quetzalcoatl.

Coming of Quetzalcoatl

Quetzalcoatl is presented as a benevolent god in human form. He is shown granting the benefits of education and culture on his people, and driving off older gods.

The Pre-Columbian Golden Age

The benefits of agriculture, arts, and science brought by Quetzalcoatl bring a golden age. A man works crops, another creates a stone stele, and a third studies the stars.

Departure of Quetzalcoatl

Adherents of the banished gods band together to drive Quetzalcoatl away. Sorcerers massed in front of a pyramidal temple oppose the departing god.

The Prophecy

This small panel, located above a door, depicts Spanish conquistadors on horseback wielding a giant Christian cross as a weapon.

Totem Poles

This pair of vertical panels are applied to poles in the western half of the room. They are caricatures of totem poles found in the Pacific Northwest.

== Cortez and the Modern Era ==
Machine Totems

These vertical panels depict modern industrial themes in a manner similar to a totem pole. They are applied to poles in the eastern half of the room.

Cortez and the Cross

This panel and the next four are located on the south wall of the eastern half of the room. Orozco depicts Hernán Cortés as a brutal anti-hero leading the 16th century Spanish conquest of the Aztec Empire, fulfilling the prophecy of Quetzalcoatl. Cortés stands surrounded by images of destruction, accompanied by a cross-bearing Franciscan friar.

The Machine

This panel marks the transition to the 20th century, depicting a mass of machinery with no discernible function.

Anglo-America

Orozco presents a visually mixed assessment of North American society. A schoolhouse and town meeting are shown, but an overbearing schoolteacher dominates the scene, and the town meeting is presented with rigidity.

Hispano-America

A modern Mexican rebel, resembling Emiliano Zapata, dominates a caricature of rich and militaristic society.

Gods of the Modern World

This panel savages the institutional church's indifference to the social upheavals of the 1930s, with flames reminiscent of the scenes from this section's first panel.

Symbols of Nationalism

This small panel is located above a door on the north wall of the east side. It depicts a junk pile of historical symbols of warfare and empire.

Modern Human Sacrifice.

An analog to the "Ancient Human Sacrifice" panel on the west side, this panel shows the body of a soldier, wrapped in the trappings of patriotism, symbolizing the pointless sacrifice of the individual for the institution. This panel is to the left of the easternmost doors.

Modern Migration of the Spirit

A depiction of Jesus, sweeps away old religious and political ideologies, discarding symbols of religion, culture, and the military. This panel is to the right of the easternmost doors.

Chain of Spirit

This panel, located over doors on the south side of the eastern half, shows vultures wearing clerical collars. They hold keys to chains of bondage piled below them.

Modern Industrial Man

This is a series of five panels, centrally located by the reserve reading desk. It presents Orozco's vision for a possible new world (after the actions of Jesus in the "Modern Migration of the Spirit" panel) in which workers are free to benefit from their own labor, and the different cultures are able to coexist harmoniously.

== See also ==
- Prometheus, Orozco's first mural in the United States
- List of National Historic Landmarks in New Hampshire
- National Register of Historic Places listings in Grafton County, New Hampshire
