= Morgan Dennis =

American illustrator and author

Morgan Dennis (1892 – October 22, 1960) was an American illustrator and author known primarily for his paintings of dogs. He was born in Boston, Massachusetts and grew up in Long Island, New York. He studied art with William Harry Warren Bicknell. He was commissioned by the Black and White Scotch Whiskey Company to illustrate the "Black and White Scotties", a successful ad campaign used over many years. One of his murals, "The Dog House", is in the bar and lounge of the Sheraton Russell Hotel in New York. He also competed in art competitions at the 1936 Summer Olympics, but did not win a medal.

== Bibliography ==
- Crazy Dog - 1944
- Burlap (Houn' Dog Extraordinary) – 1945
- The Dog Next Door – 1950
- Himself and Burlap on TV – 1954
- Kitten On The Keys – 1961
- Lost Dog Jerry – 1952
- The Morgan Dennis Dog Book (With Some Special Cats) – 1946
- Pete (Airedale Terrier) – 1941
- The Pup Himself – 1943
- The Sea Dog – 1958
- Skit And Skat – 1951
- Every Dog Has His Say – 1947

"Pure Breeds" – 1954
