= Piero Manzoni =

Italian avant-garde artist (1933–1963)

- Manzoni in 1960
- Born: Piero Meroni Manzoni di Chiosca e Poggiolo; July 13, 1933; Soncino, Italy
- Died: February 6, 1963 (aged 29); Milan, Italy
- Known for: Artist
- Notable work: Artist's Shit
- Movement: Conceptual art

Piero Manzoni di Chiosca e Poggiolo (July 13, 1933 – February 6, 1963) was an Italian artist best known for his ironic approach to avant-garde art. Often compared to the work of Yves Klein, his own work anticipated, and directly influenced, the work of a generation of younger Italian artists brought together by the critic Germano Celant in the first Arte Povera exhibition held in Genoa, 1967. Manzoni is most famous for a series of artworks that call into question the nature of the art object, directly prefiguring Conceptual Art. His work eschews normal artist's materials, instead using everything from rabbit fur to human excrement in order to "tap mythological sources and to realize authentic and universal values".

His work is widely seen as a critique of the mass production and consumerism that was changing Italian society (the Italian economic miracle) after World War II. Italian artists such as Manzoni had to negotiate the new economic and material order of post-war Europe through inventive artistic practices which crossed geographic, artistic, and cultural borders. Manzoni died of myocardial infarction in his studio in Milan on February 6, 1963. His contemporary Ben Vautier signed Manzoni's death certificate, declaring it a work of art.

== Biography ==
Manzoni was born in Soncino, in the province of Cremona, as the eldest of five children of Egisto Manzoni and Valeria Meroni. His full name was Count Meroni Manzoni di Chiosca e Poggiolo. Through his sister Elena he was the uncle of the artist Pippa Bacca. Self-taught as an artist, Manzoni first exhibited at the Soncino's Castle in Soncino in August 1956, at the age of 23. His early work was broadly gestural, and showed the influence of Milanese proponents of Nuclear Art, such as Enrico Baj. His later works, from approximately 1957 until his death in 1963, questioned and satirized the status of the art object as it had been conceived throughout modernism. Influences include earlier yet still active artists like Marcel Duchamp and contemporaneous practitioners Ben Vautier and Yves Klein.

=== Achromes ===
Achrome, 1961–62

Manzoni's work changed irrevocably after visiting Yves Klein's exhibition 'Epoca Blu' at the Galleria Apollinaire in Milan, January 1957. This exhibition consisted of 11 identical blue monochromes. By the end of the year, he had ceased producing work influenced by the prevailing trends in Art Informel, to works that responded directly to Klein's monochromes. Called Achromes, they invariably looked white but were actually colourless. In these paintings Manzoni experimented with various pigments and materials. Initially favouring canvases coated in gesso (1957–1958), he also worked with kaolin, another form of white clay often used in the production of porcelain.

The kaolin works are generally made from clay covered canvases folded horizontally, or sometimes cut-out squares of canvas coated in the clay and adhered onto the canvas; he created just nine large-scale relief paintings depicting folded cloth. As well as Yves Klein, these works showed the influence of Lucio Fontana and Alberto Burri and the American artist Robert Rauschenberg, who had painted neutral white canvases in 1951. He would later create Achromes from white cotton wool, fiberglass, rabbit skin and bread rolls. He also experimented with phosphorescent paint and cobalt chloride so that the colours would change over time.

== Azimut Gallery ==
Manzoni founded the Azimut Gallery in Milan in 1959 with the artist Enrico Castellani, and staged a series of revolutionary exhibitions of multiples. The first, 12 Linee (12 Lines) took place in December 1959, quickly followed by Corpi d'Aria (Bodies of Air) in May 1960. This was an edition of 45 balloons on tripods that could be blown up by the buyer, or the artist himself, depending on the price paid. In July 1960, he exhibited Consumption of Art by the Art-Devouring Public, in which he hard-boiled 70 eggs, printed his thumbprint onto them, and after eating several himself handed them out to the audience to eat. The eggs themselves were titled Uova con impronta (Egg With Thumbprint). This was the last exhibition by Manzoni at Azimuth, after which the gallery was forced to close when the lease ran out. Although the invitation named the Gallery Azimut as the location of the opening, the actual event took place at the Studio Filmgiornale Sedi in Milan. The discrepancy between the location on the invitation and the film studio where the event was recorded further complicates the role and space of art as it was expected to be seen.

Artist's Breath, 1960

=== Artist's Breath ===
Contemporaneously with the Bodies of Air (Corpi D'Aria), Manzoni produced the Artist's Breaths (Fiato d'Artista), a series of red, white or blue balloons, inflated and attached to a wooden base inscribed "Piero Manzoni- Artist's Breath". The works continued Manzoni's obsession with the limits of physicality, whilst parodying the Art World's obsession with permanence, and also provided a poignant Memento Mori.

=== Artist's Shit ===
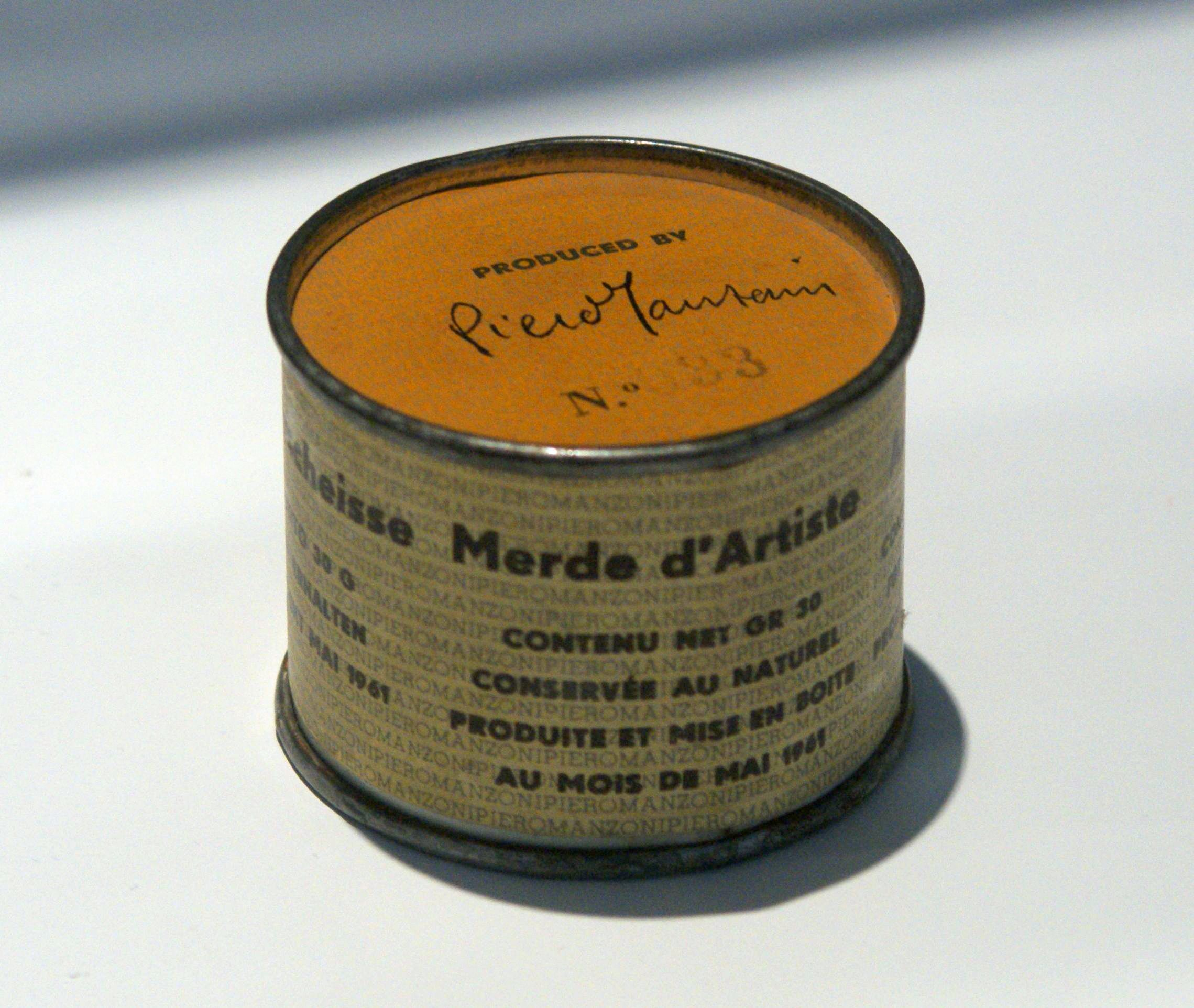
Artist's Shit

In May 1961, Manzoni created 90 small cans, sealed with the text Artist's Shit (Merda d'Artista). Each 30-gram can was priced by weight based on the current value of gold (around $1.12 a gram in 1960). The contents of the cans remain a much-disputed enigma, since opening them would destroy the value of the artwork. Various theories about the contents have been proposed, including speculation that it is plaster. In the following years, the cans have spread to various art collections all over the world and netted large prices, far outstripping inflation. A tin was sold for € 124,000 at Sotheby's on May 23, 2007; in October 2008, tin 83 was offered for sale at Sotheby's with an estimate of £ 50–70,000. It sold for £97,250. It was described thusly:

"It is a joke, a parody of the art market, and a critique of consumerism and the waste it generates."

— Stephen Bury

On October 16, 2015, tin 54 was sold at Christies for £182,500. The tins were originally to be valued according to their equivalent weight in gold – $37 each in 1961 – with the price fluctuating according to the market. Other works from this period include limited edition thumbprints, and the Declarations of Authenticity, 1961–62, a printed multiple that could be bought, proving the owner's status as either part or whole work of art, depending on the price paid. He also designated a number of people, including Umberto Eco, as authentic works of art gratis. Various other experimental pieces by Manzoni included trying to create a mechanical animal as a moving sculpture and using solar energy as a power source. In 1960 he created a sphere that was held aloft on a jet of air.

== Works ==
The following list records some of the works created by Piero Manzoni between 1956 and 1963. Much of the content is sourced from Database.

=== Paintings ===
- 1956, Untitled (Untitled), oil on canvas.
- 1956, Untitled (Untitled), tempera and oil on paper.
- 1956, Untitled (Senza Tleolo), oil on canvas.
- 1956, Composition (Composizione), oil on canvas.
- 1956–1957, Scissors (Forbici), oil and tar on canvas forming 21 scissor shapes. Later, Manzoni created a dark version in 1957.
- 1957, Genus (Genus), oil and tar on canvas.
- 1957, Untitled (Senza titolo), oil and tar on canvas.
- 1957, Untitled (Senza titolo), enamel on paper.
- 1957, Untitled (Senza titolo), tar, tempera and enamel on canvas forming a black skull shape.
- 1958, Achromes (Achromes).
- 1958, Achrome-White (Achrome-Bianco).
- 1958, Ireland (Irlanda), lithograph on map paper forming the complete shape and regions of Ireland.
- 1959, Cork Cotton (Impronta sughero), cork lithograph.
- 1959, Cork Lithograph (Impronta Sughero), brown collage, from La lune en rodage I.
- 1959, Line (Linea), horizontal line drawn on paper with ink.
- 1960, The Artist’s Fingerprint (The Artist’s Fingerprint), Manzoni imprinted his fingerprint on a plate.
- 1960, Thumbprint (Thumbprint), Manzoni dipped his thumb in ink and imprinted it on paper.
- 1960, Proof of Work (Prova d'opera), mixed media on board placed on canvas.
- 1960, Footprint (Impronta), Manzoni dipped his fingerprint in ink and imprinted it on paper, signing "IIEAO HAN20NI’60" below the print.
- 1960, Right Thumbprint (Impronta del pollice destro), lithograph.
- 1961, Linea m 3,10 (frammento), ink on paper.
- 1961, Rauchbild (Rauchbild), candle smoke forming a horizontal line on paper.
- 1962, Package (Pacco), painting, oil, and mixed media.
- Year unknown, Tomorrow at Sea (Domani al Mare), ink on paper.
- Year unknown, With a line (With a line), gelatin silver print.

=== Achrome Series: Abstract Art ===
- 1957, Achrome (Achrome), mixed media and plaster on canvas.
- 1957, Achrome (Achrome), white canvas, rough plaster, liquid glue, and kaolin.
- 1958, Achrome (Achrome), canvas and clay.
- 1958, Achrome (Achrome), kaolin on pleated canvas.
- 1958, Achrome (Achrome), fiberglass reinforced plastic.
- 1958, Achrome (Achrome), kaolin on canvas.
- 1958, Manzoni's Achromatic Painting (La pittura acromatica di Manzoni), gelatin silver print (two pieces).
- 1958–1959, Achrome (Achrome), kaolin on canvas.
- 1959, Achrome (Achrome), board.
- 1959, Achrome (Achrome), fabric on stretchers.
- 1959, Achrome (Achrome), kaolin on canvas.
- 1959, Achrome (Achrome), frame made of durable plastic.
- 1959, Achrome (Achrome), cotton sewn on linen.
- 1959–1960, Achrome (Achrome), squares of sewn canvas.
- 1960, Achrome (Achrome), carpet.
- 1960, Achrome (Achrome), handmade paper.
- 1960, Achrome (Achrome), squares of cotton yarn.
- 1960, Achrome (Achrome), squares of sheep's wool.
- 1960, Achrome (Achrome), squares of cotton.
- 1960, Achrome (Achrome), DM frame and floor tiles.
- 1960, Achrome (Achrome), DM frame with lines forming a 35-square grid.
- 1960–1962, Achrome (Achrome), nylon fabric mounted on a panel wrapped in white velvet, housed in a velvet-lined wooden box.
- 1961, Achrome (Achrome), plush.
- 1961, Achrome (Achrome), cotton.
- 1961, Achrome (Achrome), synthetic fibers.
- 1961, Achrome (Achrome), white plaster block (kaolin).
- 1961, Achrome (Achrome), white feathers.
- 1961, Achrome-Glass Wool (Achrome-Lana di vetro), fiberglass.
- 1961, Achrome (Achrome), squares of polystyrene.
- 1961, Achrome (Achrome), polystyrene and phosphorescent paint.
- 1961–1962, Achrome (Eggs in Acrylic Resin), consisting of 16 eggs cast in acrylic resin and placed in a Plexiglas showcase.
- 1962, Achrome (Achrome), unknown material.
- 1962, Achrome (Achrome), fiberglass.
- 1962, Achrome (Achrome), 6 bread rolls attached to kaolin.
- 1962, Achrome (Achrome), 35 bread rolls attached to kaolin.
- 1962, Achrome (Achrome), canvas.
- 1963, Achrome (Sassi) (Achrome (Stones)), stones and white pigment on canvas.

=== Installation Art ===
- 1959, Lines of Exceptional Length (Lines of Exceptional Length), lines drawn on paper, the longest of which was 7.2 km (created in Denmark). Manzoni intended to leave one in every major city in the world, which would equal the length of the equator when joined.
- 1961, Line 1000 Meters Long (Line 1000 Meters Long), sealed in a metal drum.
- 1959–1960, Bodies of Air (Corpi d'aria), pneumatic sculpture kit consisting of a box, tripod, balloon, and mouthpiece. 45 copies were produced.
- 1959–1960, Body of Air (Body of Air), a backup or display version of Bodies of Air,Manzoni makes standing balloons that come in red, white, and blue.
- 1960, Artist's Breath (Artist's Breath), inflated balloons available in red, white, and blue.
- 1960, Fiato d'artista (Fiato d'artista), rubber balloon, string, glue, metal tag, and wood base; a deflated version of Artist's Breath with the balloon attached to the board.
- 1960, Eggs (Uova / Ega), hard-boiled eggs with thumbprints meant to be consumed by the audience, Manzoni left his fingerprints on hard-boiled eggs and put them in a box, implying that he had betrayed them.
- 1961, Magic Base (Magisk Sockkel), a series of wooden plinths that could be stood on to acquire status of "Living Sculpture".
- 1961, Base of the World (Socle du Monde / Base of the World), a large metal plinth inscribed "The Base Of The World, Homage To Galileo" placed upside down in a field in Herning, Denmark. It announces that the whole world is a work of art, rendering the artist obsolete.
- 1961, Artist's Shit (Merda d'artista), 90 sealed tin cans (4.8x6.5 cm) each containing 30 grams of excrement.

=== Books and literary works ===
- 1962, Some Achievements, Experiments, and Projects (Alcune realizzazioni, alcuni esperimenti, alcuni progetti), a three-page book detailing results, experiments, and projects.
- 1962, Alfabeto, Lithograph on cardboard.
- 1963, Piero Manzoni; The Life And Works (Piero Manzoni; The Life And Works), an artist's book published posthumously by Jes Petersen. It consists of 100 sheets of transparent plastic bound to a white metal sheet. The only text is the title page; the rest of the book is totally blank.

== Exhibitions ==
Manzoni's works were often featured at Galleria Azimuth. His work has been the subject of numerous international exhibitions, including retrospectives at the Musée d'Art Moderne de la Ville de Paris (1991), Castello di Rivoli-Museo d'Arte Contemporanea (1992), the Serpentine Gallery, London (1998), at the Museo d'Arte Contemporanea Donnaregina, Naples (2007), curated by Germano Celant, and in 2019 "Piero Manzoni: Materials of His Time" at Hauser & Wirth's Los Angeles and then New York City galleries.

== Collections ==
Manzoni's work is represented in many public collections, including the Museum of Modern Art, New York; Stedelijk Museum, Amsterdam; Tate Modern, London; the Galleria Civica d'Arte Moderna e Contemporanea, Turin; and the Museum of Contemporary Art Villa Croce in Genoa.

== Legacy ==
Fondazione Piero Manzoni, a family-run Italian foundation, oversees the artist's estate. It has been represented by Hauser & Wirth since 2017.

== See also ==
- Conceptual Art
- Linee
- Artist's Shit
- Corpo d'aria
- Arte Povera
