= Charles Pillet =

French sculptor and engraver

Charles Pillet (July 20, 1869 – 1960) was a French sculptor and engraver.

Born in Paris, Pillet was a pupil of Henri-Michel-Antoine Chapu and Jules-Clément Chaplain. He won the first Grand Prix de Rome engraving medals 1890. He became a member of the Société des Artistes Français in 1898. The Louvre preserves a letter he wrote to Eugène Delacroix.

== Life and work ==
Though he described himself as Engraver, he was both engraver and sculptor. Charles Philippe Germain Pillet was born in Paris on 20 July 1869, the son of a craftsman who restored polychrome statues, whose work took him travelling to churches and cathedrals across France. In July 1886, after one year studying at the École des Arts Décoratifs, Charles entered the Ecole Nationale Supérieure des Beaux Arts, studying under Henri Chapu, who was a member of the Academy of Beaux Arts. Young Charles loved Chapu like a father, and until the end of his life would speak warmly of him, with much emotion.

Four years later, in 1890, at the age of 21 Pillet was awarded the first prize Prix de Rome for medallion engraving (the subject was Phorbas extracting the child Oedipus from the tree) From 1892 to 1895 he was an intern at the Villa Médicis in Rome. Seven major sketches made there bore witness to his talent as a medallion maker.

On his return to Paris, he was accepted into the Salon des Artistes Français which awarded him a first class medal in 1905, followed in 1928 by a Médaille d’Honneur.

During this period Pillet began to receive many commissions for medallions and plaquettes: in 1898 of General Porfirio Díaz, President of Mexico, in 1902 another commemorating the famous airman Santos Dumont at the Tour Eiffel; in 1910 another commemorating Henri Germain the founder of the Crédit Lyonnais bank. He also engraved coins for the Grand Duchy of Luxembourg, Morocco, Mexico, Romania as well as many plaques for national and international exhibitions. These included Saint Louis (1904), Liége (1905), Milan (1906), London (1908), Bruxelles and Buenos-Aires (1910).

Following the end of World War One, Pinet made several commemorative medals for the Paris Mint, including Verdun, No Entry!, The Debarkation of American Troops, and The Recapture of Douamont.

Shortly after followed a large number of large scale medallions and busts of eminent people; scientists, doctors, musicians, politicians, and also friends and family members.

He also made large scale public sculpture such as the Brauvilliers limestone sculpture at Notre-Dame d’Épreville (Seine Maritime), erected in thanks for keeping the town safe from the horrors of war and consecrated in 1948.

Pillet worked into advanced old age, up until 1952 when he completed a medallion of the music editor, Francis Salabert. He was promoted to the grade of Officier of the Légion d’Honneur in 1954 and died in 1960.

== Honors and awards ==
- Grand Prix de Rome engraving medal in 1890.
- Third-class medal in 1895.
- Second-class medal in 1896.
- Silver medal at the Universal Exhibition of 1900.
- First class medal in 1905.
- Medal of Honor in 1923.
- Knight of the Legion of Honour in 1911.

== Bibliography ==
- Emmanuel Bénézit Dictionary of painters, sculptors, designers and engravers, 1976, Volume 8, p. 336.
