= Rico Lebrun =

20th-century Italian-American painter and sculptor

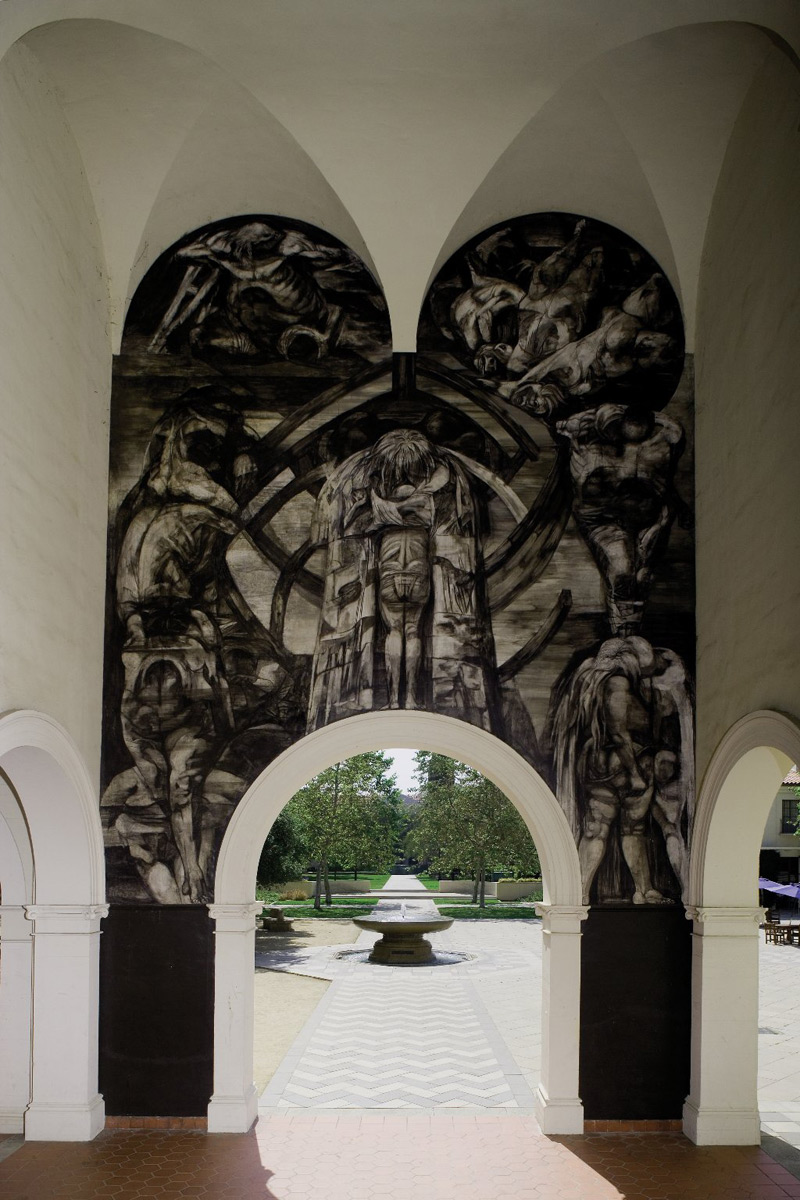
Rico Lebrun's Genesis (1960) at Pomona College

Rico Federico Lebrun (December 10, 1900 – May 9, 1964) was an Italian-American painter and sculptor.

== Early life ==
Lebrun was born in 1900 in Naples, Italy. Before he started his art career he began a two-year service in the Italian Army during World War 1. Then he studied banking and journalism before taking art classes at the Naples Academy of Fine Arts from 1919 to 1921. Following this he went to Florence, where he studied as a muralist. He received practical training at a stained-glass factory.

== Artistic career ==
After moving to the United States in 1924, he worked as a commercial artist in Pittsburgh and New York for several years. In the early 1930s he returned to Italy where he studied the frescoes of Luca Signorelli. He moved to California in 1936. He exhibited in New York, Boston, Chicago, Los Angeles, and Toronto. In the mid-1950s, his work focused on the experience of the concentration camps at Buchenwald and Dachau. He is best known for his series of paintings on "The Crucifixion."

== Teaching ==
In 1940, Lebrun taught at the Chouinard Art Institute in Los Angeles, then at the Jepson Art Institute, also in L.A., from 1947–50, directing it from 1951-54 when it closed. In 1938 for one year and half, he presided art drawing classes at Disney during the production of Bambi. In 1958 Lebrun was a visiting lecturer of art at Yale University. He also taught at UCLA, Tulane University and the Art Students' League of New York.

== Personal life ==
Lebrun was survived by his filmmaker son David (b. 1944), his widow, Constance, his mother, Assunta Lebrun, brother, Eugenio and sister, Maria.

== Awards ==
- John Simon Guggenheim Memorial Foundation Fellowship (1936–37)
- John Simon Guggenheim Memorial Foundation Fellowship (1937–38)
- First Prize, "Abstract & Surrealist American Art", The Art Institute of Chicago (1947)
- Norman Wait Harris Silver Medal, The Art Institute of Chicago (1947)
- First Prize, "Artists of Los Angeles & Vicinity", Los Angeles County Museum of Art (1948)
- Purchase Prize, "Illinois National Exhibition of Contemporary Painting", University of Illinois (1949)
- Second Prize, "American Painting Today", The Metropolitan Museum of Art (1950)
- Award of Merit of the American Academy of Arts & Letters for "Outstanding achievement in the past five years in paintings" (1952)
- Temple Gold Medal, The Pennsylvania Academy of the Fine Arts (1953)
- Lippincott Prize, The Pennsylvania Academy of the Fine Arts (1962)
- Elected into the National Academy of Design (1962)
- Purchase Award, "Third Biennial National Print Exhibit", Pasadena Art Museum (1962)
- Joseph Pennell Award, The Pennsylvania Academy of the Fine Arts (1963)
- John Simon Guggenheim Memorial Foundation Fellowship (1962–63)

== Collections ==
Lebrun's papers are held in the Smithsonian Archives of American Art. His work is included in numerous collections, including:

- the Museum of Modern Art, New York,
- the Los Angeles County Museum of Art,
- the Metropolitan Museum of Art, New York
- the Whitney Museum of American Art,
- The Jewish Museum, New York,
- the North Carolina Museum of Art,
- the Benton Museum of Art,
- the Santa Barbara Museum of Art,
- the Vincent Price museum of Art,
- the Harvard Art Museum,
- the Museo ItaloAmericano, and
- the Claremont Museum of Art.
- the Collection of Modern Religious Art, Vatican Museums
