= Artist's Shit =

Artist's multiple by Piero Manzoni

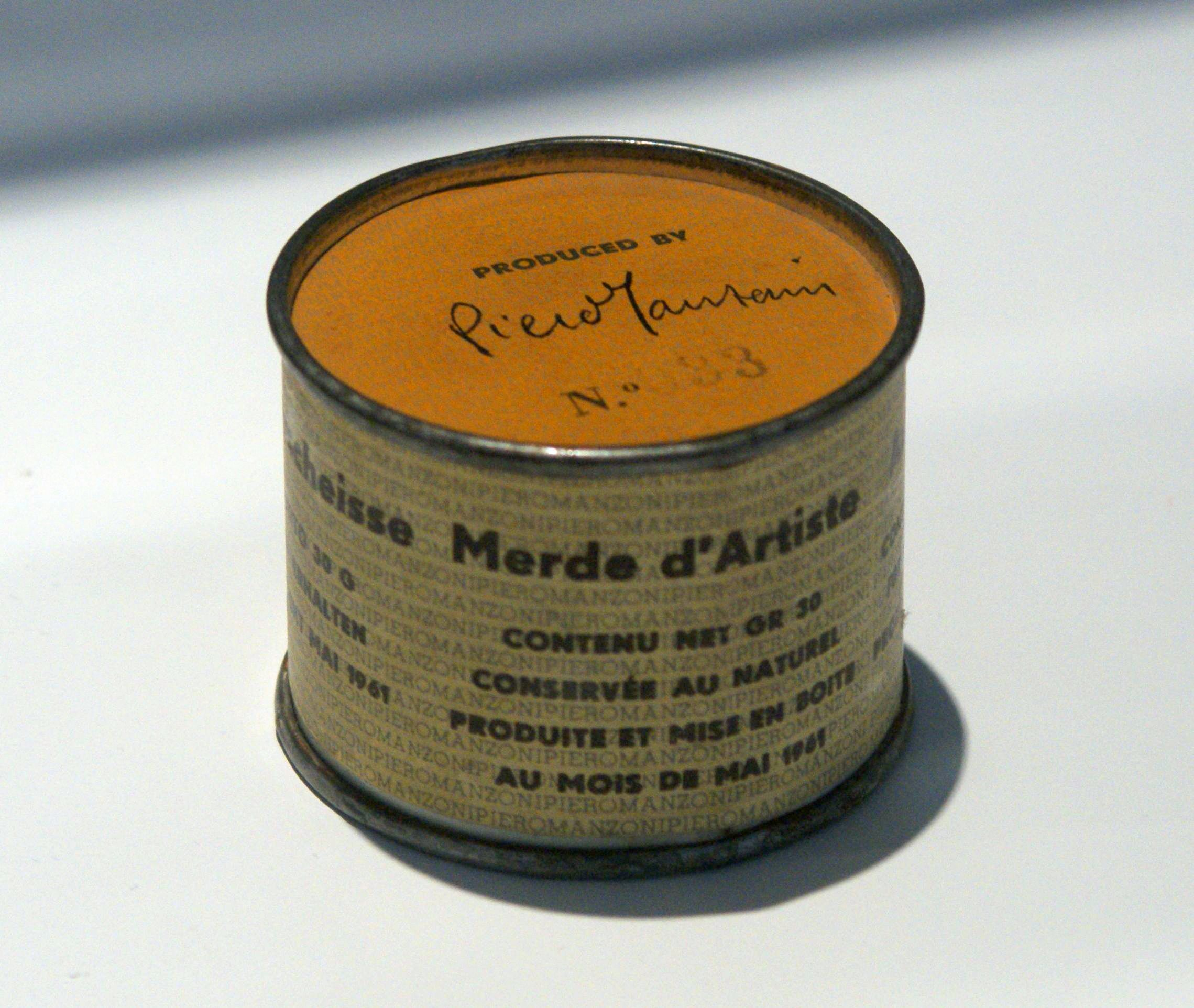
Artist's Shit

Artist's Shit (Italian: Merda d'artista) is a 1961 anti-artwork by Piero Manzoni. The work consists of 90 tin cans, each reportedly filled with 30 grams (1.1 oz) of feces, and measuring 4.8 by 6.5 centimetres (1.9 in × 2.6 in), with a label in Italian, English, French, and German stating:

Artist's Shit
Contents 30 gr net
Freshly preserved
Produced and tinned
in May 1961

== Inspiration and interpretations ==
At the time the piece was created, Manzoni was producing works that explored the relationship between art production and human production, Artist's Breath (Fiato d'artista), a series of balloons filled with his own breath, being an example. In December 1961, Manzoni wrote in a letter to his friend Ben Vautier:

I should like all artists to sell their fingerprints, or else stage competitions to see who can draw the longest line or sell their shit in tins. The fingerprint is the only sign of the personality that can be accepted: if collectors want something intimate, really personal to the artist, there's the artist's own shit, that is really his.

Another friend, Enrico Baj, said that the cans were meant as "an act of defiant mockery of the art world, artists, and art criticism". Artist's Shit has been interpreted in relation to Karl Marx's idea of commodity fetishism and Marcel Duchamp's readymades. In September 2021, YBA artist Gavin Turk made a piece called "Artist's Piss" where he canned his own urine and sold it for its weight in silver.

During the NFT market boom of 2021, Manzoni's concept was adapted into blockchain-based digital artworks, including Federica Sutti's "Crypto Merda d'Artista" video loop (May 2021) and "The 100 Pieces of Shit," a collection deployed on the Ethereum blockchain (October 2021), both continuing the original work's satirical critique of art market commodification and speculative value.

== Value ==
A tin was sold for €124,000 at Sotheby's on May 23, 2007. In October 2008, tin 83 was offered for sale at Sotheby's with an estimate of £50,000–70,000. It sold for £97,250. On October 16, 2015, tin 54 was sold at Christies for £182,500. In August 2016, at an art auction in Milan, one of the tins sold for a new record of €275,000, including auction fees. The tins were originally to be valued according to their equivalent weight in gold – $37 each in 1961 – with the price fluctuating according to the market.

== Contents of the cans ==
One of Manzoni's former friends, Agostino Bonalumi, claimed that the tins are full not of feces but plaster. The cans are steel, and thus cannot be x-rayed or scanned to determine the contents, and opening a can would cause it to lose its value; as a result, the true contents of Artist's Shit are unknown. Bernard Bazile exhibited a partially opened can of Artist's Shit in 1989, titling it Opened can of Piero Manzoni (French: Boite ouverte de Piero Manzoni). The can's contents were difficult to identify on sight, being variously described as "paper wrapping with unidentified contents", "an unidentifiable wrapped object", and "a can within a can". Bazile did not attempt to extract or open the inner object.

The piece received media coverage due to a lawsuit in the mid-1990s, when an art museum in Randers, Denmark, was accused by art collector John Hunov of causing leakage of a can which had been on display at the museum in 1994. Allegedly, the museum had stored the can at irresponsibly high temperatures. The lawsuit ended with the museum paying a 250,000 Danish kroner settlement to the collector, approximately US$35,000.

== See also ==
- Shock art
- Gamer Girl Bath Water
- Piss Christ
