= Gretchen Bender =

American artist (1951–2004)

Gretchen Bender

TV Text & Image (DREAM NATION) (1989), Smithsonian American Art Museum. Live television broadcasts are used in this artwork, with the vinyl lettering DREAM NATION attached to the screen.

Gretchen Bender (1951 in Seaford, Delaware – December 19, 2004 in New York City) was an American artist who worked in film, video, and photography. She was from the so-called 1980s Pictures Generation of artists, which included Cindy Sherman, Robert Longo, Jack Goldstein, Laurie Simmons and Richard Prince, and who mixed elements of Conceptual Art and Pop Art using images from popular culture to examine its powerful codes.

Bender also designed the credits for the TV show America's Most Wanted, which Roberta Smith of the New York Times suggested in 2004 "may have originated the rapid-fire hyper-editing now pervasive in film, television and video art." She also directed music videos for such musicians as Babes in Toyland; edited music videos directed by Robert Longo; and designed sets for choreographers Bill T. Jones and Molissa Fenley, including the former's Still/Here that New Yorker dance critic Arlene Croce condemned.

Her work is in the collections of the Museum of Modern Art in New York City, the Pompidou Center in Paris and the Menil Collection in Houston.

Bender is one of five artists that art historian Patrick Frank examines in his 2024 book Art of the 1980s: As If the Digital Mattered.

== Early life ==
Bender was born in Seaford, Delaware to Charles and Carolyn Bender, and had one brother and two sisters. Her childhood was characterized by the era of big Hollywood extravaganzas at local theaters and constant messaging by early television. Her parents had a general interest in art and supported her in learning basic art techniques, leading her to develop an interest in traditional studio art.

== Education ==
She earned a bachelor of fine arts from the University of North Carolina at Chapel Hill in 1973. Her instructors emphasized the decorative nature of studio art, which alienated her from the general art curriculum. It was only later, when visiting the university's art gallery, that she was introduced to a group exhibition of experimental artworks. This experience exposed her to a new way of exploring and communicating ideas and visions that drew her to engage in various cultural examinations of the time.

She then turned to the printmaking department, seeing it as the best place for radical discovery within the art school. It was there that she became interested in the silkscreening process because of its potential for mass production and targeting large audiences.

== Early career ==
After university, Bender moved to Washington, DC to continue her interest in printmaking by working at a feminist-Marxist silkscreening collective. There she printed banners, T-shirts, and other materials for political demonstrations. These exercises helped her absorb crucial information related to the synthesis of art and politics (a practice relevant to her later work). Though her work in DC created a solid foundation for her future work, she felt the city was too constricting for young emerging artists. She was soon attracted by New York City and its large experimental performance scene.

On moving to New York in 1978, Bender befriended like-minded artists including Eric Bogosian, Bill T. Jones, Robert Longo, Richard Prince, Cindy Sherman and Arnie Zane. Emboldened by this supportive community, she continued working in silkscreening, but now on square tin panels, arranging them in various shapes. She began to incorporate abstract computer graphics into her work, generated from media images found in network television.

By 1982 Bender had found television a fruitful source of imagery that she could reprocess and re-contexualize. This became a differentiating advantage, as few artists had the necessary technical skills to utilize TV as a source. In a 1985 article in Andy Warhol's Interview Magazine, Bender asserted that “artists should be spending their money on VCRs instead of paint and canvas.” This differentiation gave her the opportunity to exhibit widely, such as at the alternative gallery Artists Space and Gallery Nature Morte.

Bender taught herself how to edit and work with video and quickly assembled her first media-theater piece, which included video, film, and slide projections that she orchestrated onstage to create the effect of a media-image overload. She used video television footage to examine corporate logos and the power structure they symbolize in society.

Her style began to evolve, combining live television, documentary, and abstract photo-panels, frequently with a chaotic aesthetic. She often silkscreened phrases and words directly onto the television screens, such as “Relax”, “I’m Going to Die”, and “People with AIDS”, labeling each broadcast image that appeared beneath them. The superimposed texts became subliminal codes, meant to awaken the viewer’s consciousness when encountering the controlled, "mental zombie" state of television, and to make viewers more critical of the content they received and the "candy-coated" images used to convey it.

== Later career ==
Bender continued to work with television, and began to group the electronic boxes into arrangements recalling the displays found in the television department of an electronics store, but with an unconscious and ideological discursive twist. In this way, Bender continued to explore the parasitic relationship between television and technology and its concomitant psychological manipulations. Through her eyes, humanity is composed of videodrome refugees.

She had her first New York solo gallery show in the East Village in 1983 at Gallery Nature Morte. She appropriated images from the Neo-Expressionist painters of her generation, and in her more dramatic pieces put computerized patterns together with grisly images from mass murders. A theme throughout her work is the contrast between the power of corporations and technology with the struggle of individual human beings.

Eventually showing with Metro Pictures, her mid-career retrospective was organized by the Everson Museum of Art in Syracuse in 1991, and toured internationally. Said Ronald A. Kuchta, then Director of the Everson Museum of Art in his foreword for the retrospective catalog, "Gretchen Bender is an artist not unlike the artist of an earlier era who observed their changing environment, examined it in their artworks, and caused a questioning public to realize that they were living in a world different from the one they took for granted. Her implied critique of the sophisticated art of advertising and media, perhaps the most cogent artistic phenomena of our time, is both apt and provocative."

Her multimedia installations also toured internationally, including: Total Recall (1987) and Dumping Core (1984), along with Wild Dead (1984), which she showed at Danceteria, the New York City dance club, have been called her central installations from that decade. Total Recall, was an eight-channel installation with 24 TV monitors and two rear projections that combined corporate logos from TV commercials, computer-generated forms by Amber Denker, doctored clips from Salvador with a post-punk soundtrack by Stuart Argabright. She was included in the 1989 Whitney show "Image World: Art and Media Culture," with Jeff Koons, Jenny Holzer, Barbara Kruger, Cindy Sherman, Sherrie Levine, and David Salle and in 1992, "Contemporary Women Artists: Mixed Messages" with Kruger and Sherman again, and Nancy Dwyer, held at the Castellani Art Museum, on the campus of Niagara University in 1992. Her 42-foot-long work People in Pain, a vinyl field backlit by neon illuminating a series of movie titles that point to the cultural and narrative meanings of the films named, was included in the 1989 "Forest of Signs" show at the Los Angeles Museum of Contemporary Art, and later, in 2014 in the Whitney Biennial. She taught video art at Hunter College in the 1990s.

She died of cancer on December 19, 2004 at age 53 in New York City and is survived by her long time partner, Mitchell Wagenberg.

== Posthumous exhibitions ==
- Gretchen Bender: Tracking the Thrill (2012), Poor Farm, Wisconsin
- Gretchen Bender, So Much Deathless (A retrospective), Red Bull Arts New York, 2019

== Collections ==
Her work is in the collections of the Museum of Modern Art and Metropolitan Museum of Art in New York City, the Pompidou Center in Paris and the Menil Collection in Houston.
