= Ericka Beckman =

American filmmaker and artist

- Born: Hampstead, New York, U.S.
- Education: California Institute of the Arts; Washington University in St. Louis
- Known for: Film, video, installation art, drawing
- Awards: Andy Warhol Foundation; National Endowment for the Arts; New York Foundation for the Arts
- Website: Ericka Beckman

Ericka Beckman, You the Better, installation image, MIT List Visual Arts Center, 2019. Original film, 16mm/color/sound, 32 min., 1983.

Ericka Beckman is an American contemporary visual artist and filmmaker. She came to prominence in the 1970s as part of the Pictures Generation, a group of American conceptual artists who appropriated popular culture imagery for the purpose of cultural critique. Beckman's practice has focused on the potential for cultural transformation and individual agency through the exposition and subversion of dominant ideologies in media. Her film and video works adopt game and fairytale tropes as structuring device, employing hand-made sets that suggest playing fields together with protagonists (or "players"), whose rule-based actions are choreographed to the rhythms of musical scores and incantations. Now considered prescient, her work has marked the rising influence and effects of video gaming and digital image-production on psychological development and social life. In a review of Beckman's first US retrospective, Margaret Carrigan wrote, "Beckman has centered her video work on the visual language of games, fairytales, and folklore. While these might be sources of childhood fun, Beckman is not playing around: her dark, techno-futuristic films and installations use these tropes to question role-play, gender and identity, as well as issues surrounding late-capitalist systems of power and control."

Beckman's work belongs to the public collections of the Museum of Modern Art (MoMA), Metropolitan Museum of Art, Centre Georges Pompidou, Whitney Museum, The Broad, and Walker Art Center, among others. She has exhibited or screened work at those institutions, as well as at Mumok (Vienna), Tate Modern, Los Angeles County Museum of Art, the Mori Art Museum (Tokyo), and Drawing Center. Beckman lives and works in New York City and is a professor emeritus of film and video at the Massachusetts College of Art and Design.

== Early life and career ==
Beckman was born in Hampstead, New York. She studied at the School of Art at Washington University in St. Louis (BFA, 1974) and the Whitney Museum Independent Study Program in New York in 1975, before relocating to attend CalArts (California Institute of the Arts). At CalArts—then building a reputation for a rigorous, theory-based curriculum under the conceptualist leadership of John Baldessari—she shifted her focus to filmmaking and performance, earning an MFA in 1976. After graduating, Beckman moved to New York along with fellow alumni such as Jack Goldstein, David Salle, Matt Mullican and James Welling, where they individually pursued artmaking that addressed an image-saturated culture and became identified, collectively, as part of the Pictures Generation.

== Work and reception ==
Beckman is known for her films that explore game-play as a means of elucidating social issues. The games involved vary by type—some resemble video games while others evoke casino games, board games and sports—and are largely concerned with questions of power, specifically its entrenchment and redistribution in social systems. Other subjects include agency, technology, gender, capitalism, ethics and knowledge. According to Boston Globe critic Cate McQuaid, "Beckman models her incantatory, hallucinogenic films on the ritualistic repetitions of games and hard labor. She draws on fairy tales and uses percussive, throbbing music. Woven together, these structures offer a desperate, frenzied model of life in a society driven by work, production, and the almighty dollar." Characters from childhood stories and media, such as "Cinderella," "Jack and the Beanstalk" and Pokémon, have been featured in Beckman's films.

Ericka Beckman, Cinderella, film still, 16mm/color/sound, 28 min., 1986.

The films are noted for their complex use of layering as a compositional principle. Beckman superimposes images, uses plays on words to create double meanings, and juxtaposes a bright, pop-art aesthetic with psychologically dark underlying themes in a manner that ARTnews described as "cheery but biting." Rhythmic temporal patterns are prominent in the work's sound and pacing, repetitive actions and chanting in concert with a kinetic, nonlinear style of editing. Much of the work is filmed in black box-style theaters, which lends itself to superimposition and allows for scenes that lack a horizon line, suggesting representational ambiguity.

Beckman's works develop an internal system of symbols which critics have likened to filmic language. Her use of symbolism, disjointed editing and black field backgrounds create what observers describe as "dreamlike" narratives, referencing reality but in a heavily abstracted form. Interactivity is regarded as a key quality in her oeuvre with considerations of audience engagement being central to her strategic use of games as a structuring device and sound, her editing style and the layout of her exhibitions. Beckman's process is considered labor-intensive for its extensive use of preliminary drawings, hand-made props, hand-drawn animation and manual manipulation of imagery, all done by the artist. She is known to conduct in-depth research for films prior to their creation, for example at NASA's Ames Research Center for her 1999 film Hiatus, and has also acted in her own works.

Critics consider Beckman's work to be rooted in surrealism and structuralism. The artist has cited child psychologist Jean Piaget, conceptualist John Cage, and artists Vito Acconci and Yvonne Rainer as creative influences. Her work is often compared and contrasted with contemporary artists such as Cindy Sherman, Dara Birnbaum, Robert Longo and Joan Jonas.

=== Early films ===
After reading Piaget's Genetic Epistemology, Beckman began creating her experimental "Super-8 Trilogy," which includes We Imitate; We Break Up (1978), The Broken Rule (1979) and Out of Hand (1980). It featured a rotating cast of performers—Beckman and artists including James Casebere, Mike Kelley and Matt Mullican—and combined childhood dream recollections, cognitive development ideas and narrative structures related to games and folklore. Characterized by elaborately choreographed performances, labor-intensive hand-altered animation, crude sets and chantlike music, the films evoked a fragmented, ambiguous experience.

The limited infrastructure for film in art at the time left Beckman to screen her work outside of traditional exhibition venues, to mixed public effect. She showed her early work at alternative spaces such as Franklin Furnace, Artists Space and The Kitchen in New York, and LAICA, Pacific Film Archive (BAMPFA) and LACE on the west coast. Its reception was divided. In a 1981 Artforum review, J. Hoberman described Beckman as "one of the most accomplished of younger American filmmakers [located] at the 'perceptual' edge of Poststructural Punk," and likened her work to primitive cartoons whose "enigmatic allegories are filled with nervous activity and comic violence, sexual imagery and syncopated energy, perceptual game-playing and ingenious homemade optical effects." Others considered her work's appearances at venues such as the Whitney Biennial influential in terms of art-world acceptance for film and video as a medium.

However, the inclusion of cinematic audiences in some of her screenings made for awkward interactions. Her first 16 mm film, the experimental meditation on competition You the Better (1983), debuted at the New York Film Festival and despite outwardly light elements—bright primary colors, punchy animated graphics, an upbeat jingle and sports lingo—offered a menacing, non-narrative vision that proved too much for a general audience. The 35-minute film—which combined elements of basketball, dodgeball and roulette in an absurdist gambling game—was met with catcalling by viewers, who were likely in attendance for the Jean Luc Godard premiere with which Beckman's was co-billed. You the Better was viewed more favorably in art circles and received subsequent attention for its early engagement with concepts such as interactivity, digital avatars, virtual reality, cybernetics, video gaming and themes involving financial success and capitalism. In 2016, it was re-presented at the Walker Art Center as a larger installation with animated props based on those from the original film.

Ericka Beckman, Switch Center, film still, 16mm/color/sound, 14 min., 2003.

=== Later films and installations ===
Issues involving gender are a focal point in Beckman's work. Cinderella (1986), one of her best-known works, is a feminist musical adaptation of the famed children's story that reformulates the protagonist's journey as an arcade-style game. The film's focus on attending rules, violations and rewards foregrounds the normally subtle workings of ideology and socialization in the story and functions as a critique of popular narrative structure, which often obscures these influences. Its surprise ending, whereby Cinderella forgoes the prince in favor of the greater prize of freedom, suggests the possibility of social change by way of personal insight and agency. Hiatus (1999/2015), a faux interactive online game with feminist leanings, features a young woman who plays a video game as "go-go cowgirl" avatar Wanda and must use the game's tools to defeat the villainous character Wang, a takeover artist who threatens to take Wanda's freedom.

Architecture is another characteristic theme for Beckman. Her 2003 film Switch Center is a post-industrial meditation on the embodiment of social power in architectural structures. Filmed in an abandoned water purification plant in Hungary, the piece shows people hard at work, flipping switches and turning cranks to keep a large machine in motion. The style of filming resembles traditional documentaries, notably excepting the animated appearance of Pokémon characters partway through the film. Beckman's decision to include the animations was inspired by the real-life interruption of Switch Center's filming by another crew filming a Pokémon commercial at the same location.

Ericka Beckman, Reach Capacity, film still, 16mm/HD/color/sound, 13 min., 2020.

Beckman filmed the disorienting work Tension Building in three stadiums, then displayed it on a large film screen opposite a set of bleachers (Secession, Vienna; 2016) in an installation positing the physical immediacy, spectacle and architecture of sports pageantry as means of sociopolitical control. The film uses interactive techniques known to invoke a mimetic response in viewers—rhythmic sound, stop-motion editing, camera movement and variations of focal length and exposure—creating an effect that Amy Taubin wrote, transformed its coliseum settings "into a giant thrashing machine."

Beckman revisited her concerns with capitalist excess in two late works. Reach Capacity (2020, M – Museum Leuven) examined contemporary real estate market abuses and the history of the Monopoly board game, invented in 1904 by feminist and socialist Lizzie Magie. The film reimagined Manhattan's grid as a game board that simulates the course of the game and real-life residential displacement, but ends with a socialist reversal that overturns the expected monopolist results. Beckman directed Stalk (Performa Biennial 2021), an anti-capitalist musical adaptation of the folktale "Jack and the Beanstalk" and her first live performance work. Like her films, Stalk exposes the hegemonic workings of a cherished archetype within a multi-field, multimedia experience—in this case, a live-action space unfolding against a Beckman-created, synchronized video backdrop. In keeping with her style, the performance featured staccato temporal patterns and a nonlinear, montage approach to scene progression.

== Collections, awards and exhibitions ==
Beckman's work belongs to the public collections of Anthology Film Archives and British Film Institute, The Broad Collection, Centre Georges Pompidou, High Museum of Art, Kunsthalle Bern, MIT List Visual Arts Center, MAMCO (Geneva), Metropolitan Museum of Art, MoMA, Saastamoinen Foundation (Helsinki), Walker Art Center, Wexner Center for the Arts, the Whitney Museum, and Zabludowicz Collection, among others. She has been recognized with awards from the Andy Warhol Foundation, LEF Foundation and CEC Artslink, and grants from the National Endowment for the Arts, New York Foundation for the Arts, New York State Council on the Arts, Massachusetts Council on the Arts and Jerome Foundation.

Beckman has had solo exhibitions at institutions including the Hirshhorn Museum, MoMA PS1, Walker Art Center, Secession, KANAL - Centre Pompidou, M – Museum Leuven, Mumok, and The Drawing Center. Retrospectives of her work have been held at Tate Modern, Kunsthalle Bern, Le Magasin – Centre National d'Art Contemporain, and MIT List Visual Arts Center. She has appeared in surveys at the Museum of Contemporary Art, Los Angeles ("A Forest of Signs," 1989), Wexner Center for the Arts, Metropolitan Museum of Art ("The Pictures Generation 1974–1984," 2009), Kestner Gesellschaft ("Fair Game," 2021), MoCA Taipei ("Making Worlds," 2022), and Fondazione Prada ("A Kind of Language," 2025), among others, as well as in four Whitney Biennials.
