= Fisher Landau Center =

Former art center in Queens, New York

Coordinates: 40°45′12.47″N 73°55′59.25″W

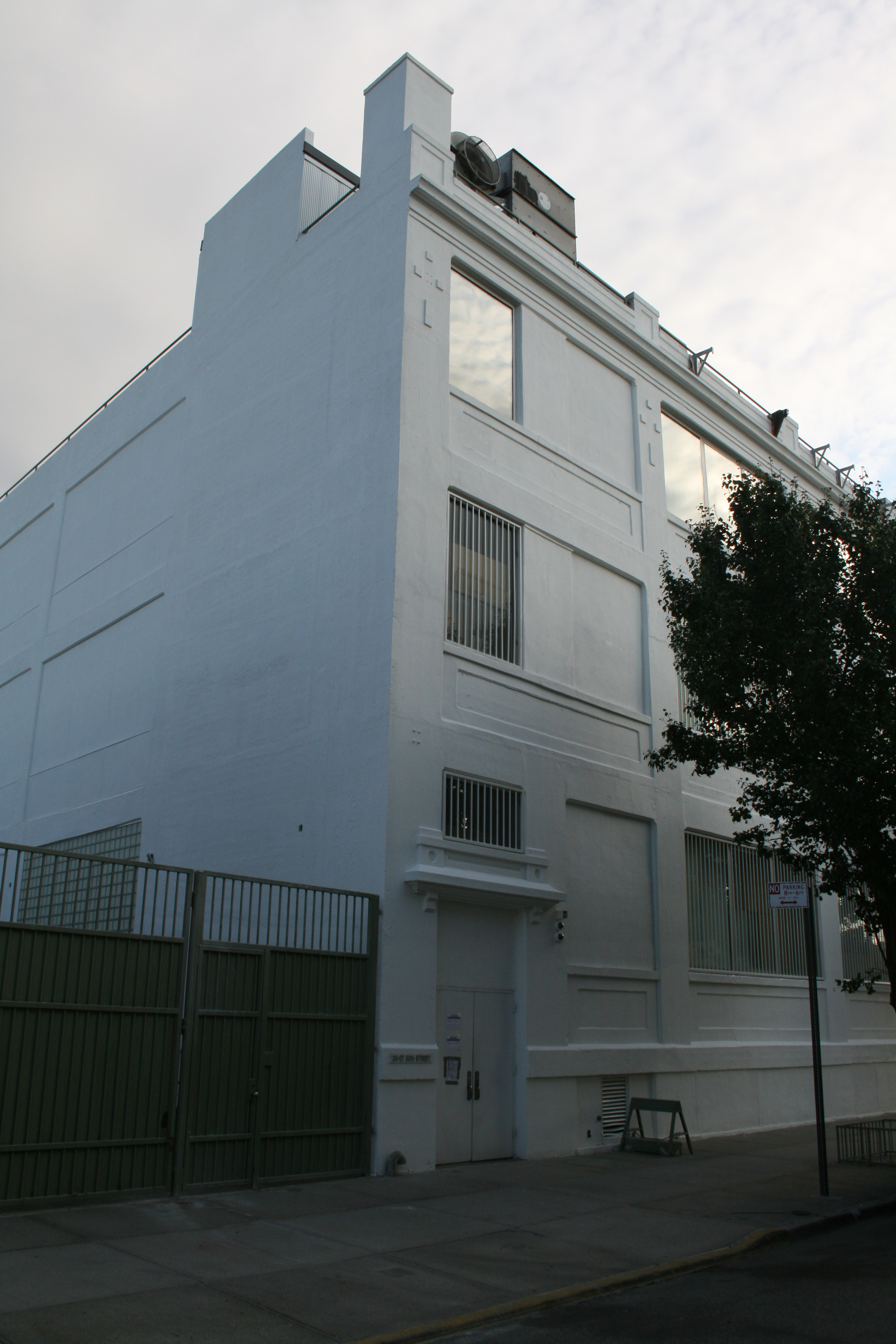
Fisher Landau Center

The Fisher Landau Center for Art is a private foundation in Long Island City, Queens, New York City, United States. It offered regular exhibitions of contemporary art, open to the public Thursdays through Mondays, until it closed to the public in November 2017.

== History ==
The center, established in 1991, was accessible by appointment only until regular public hours were established in April 2003. The 25,000-square-foot (2,300 m^{2}), three-story facility is devoted to the exhibition and study of the contemporary art collection of Emily Fisher Landau. The core of the 1,500-work collection is art from 1960 to the 2000s, and contained key works by artists who had shaped the most significant art of the prior 50 years, including Ellsworth Kelly, Cy Twombly, Andy Warhol, Susan Rothenberg, Barbara Kruger, Annette Lemieux, Matthew Barney, Richard Artschwager, Donald Baechler, John Baldessari, Jenny Holzer, Alfredo Jaar, Neil Jenney, Jasper Johns, Donald Judd, Sherrie Levine, Glenn Ligon, Agnes Martin, Robert Rauschenberg, Ed Ruscha, Kiki Smith and Mark Tansey.

Once a parachute-harness factory, the building at 38-27 30th Street in Long Island City was transformed into galleries and a library by the late English architect Max Gordon, designer of the widely admired Saatchi Collection in London, in collaboration with Bill Katz. A close friend and adviser to Ms. Landau, Mr. Katz also serves as curator for the collection. The center is appointed with furniture by Warren McArthur, a mid-20th century designer of whose work Ms. Landau has collected some 150 examples.

== Emily Fisher Landau ==
Emily Fisher Landau (1920-2023), the widow of Martin Fisher and who was married to Sheldon Landau, was a principal in the real estate firm of Fisher Brothers. Mrs Landau was a generous donor to other institutions, notably the Whitney Museum of American Art, where the fourth-floor galleries are named for her, and where she served on the board of trustees. She also served on the Painting and Sculpture Committee of the Museum of Modern Art, New York, and the Board of Trustees of the Georgia O'Keeffe Museum in Santa Fe.
