= Roselee Goldberg =

American art historian

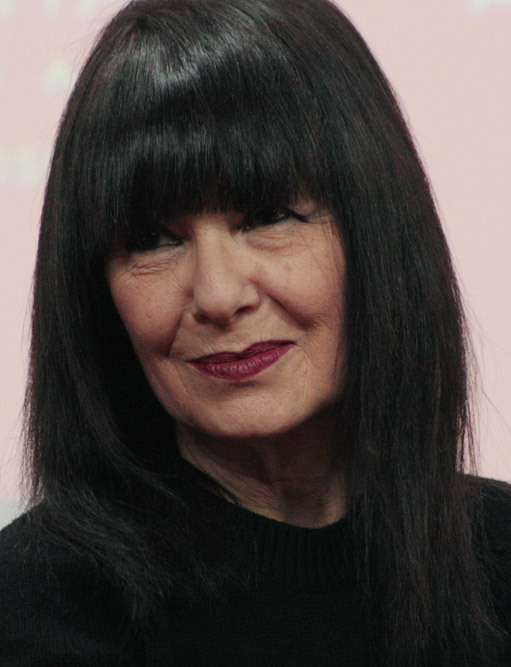
Roselee Goldberg in 2013

RoseLee Goldberg is an art historian, author, critic and curator of performance art. She is most well known as being the founder and director of Performa, a performance art organisation. She is also currently a Clinical Associate Professor of Arts Administration at New York University.

== Early life ==
Goldberg was born in Durban, South Africa and grew up in a middle-class family. She danced in her youth. Goldberg studied political science and fine arts at Wits University, Johannesburg. In 1970 she attained a degree in Art History from the Courtauld Institute of Art in London.

== Career ==
As director of the Royal College of Art's Gulbenkian Gallery, London, (1972–75) Goldberg set precedents for exhibiting modern and contemporary performance and organised exhibitions, performance series, and symposia on a broad range of multi-disciplinary artists including Marina Abramović, Bernd and Hilla Becher, Christian Boltanski, Brian Eno, the Kipper Kids, Piero Manzoni, Anthony McCall, and Christo and Jeanne Claude.

In 1975 Goldberg moved to New York City. In 1978 Goldberg became a curator at The Kitchen, New York. Her programming included the creation of an exhibition space, a video viewing room, and performance series. While at The Kitchen, Goldberg presented works by Laurie Anderson, Sherrie Levine and Robert Longo. She also organised performances by Philip Glass, Peter Gordon, Meredith Monk, and Robert Wilson and curated the first solo exhibitions of Jack Goldstein, David Salle, and Cindy Sherman, among others.

Goldberg has curated several performance series including "Six Evenings of Performance," as part of the High and Low: Modern Art and Popular Culture, exhibition at the Museum of Modern Art, New York and Couleurs Superposees: Acte VII, a performance by Daniel Buren, (in association with Works & Process), at the Guggenheim, New York.

In 2001 Goldberg commissioned and produced Logic of the Birds, a multi-media performance by Shirin Neshat. Developed in residency at Mass MOCA, Logic of the Birds was presented in workshop at the Kitchen in 2001, and premiered at the 2002 Lincoln Center Festival, and toured to the Walker Arts Center, Minneapolis, and Artangel, London.

In 2004, Goldberg founded Performa, a non-profit multi-disciplinary arts organisation for performance art. According to the organisation's Mission Statement, Performa was created to commission new performance projects, to present a dedicated performance biennial, to consult and collaborate with art institutions, and to offer ongoing education on performance art. The organisation also hosts the Performa Biennial, which Goldberg considers "a form of radical urbanism to counteract the homogenisation of New York". Artists who have created performances include William Kentridge.

Goldberg has taught at New York University since 1987 and has lectured at Columbia University, the Guggenheim Museum, New York, Kyoto University of Art and Design, the Mori Art Museum, Tokyo, the Tate Modern, London, the Whitney Museum of American Art, and Yale University, among other institutions.

In 2009, Goldberg co-curated 100 Days, a travelling exhibition on the history of performance art with Klaus Biesenbach.

In 2013 Goldberg produced rapper Jay-Z's performance art video for his song "Picasso Baby," which included notable artists such as Marina Abramović, Lawrence Weiner and Fred Wilson.

== Publications ==
She wrote a study of performance art, Performance Art: From Futurism to the Present. Published in 1979 and now in its third edition (2001), Goldberg's book is now a key text for teaching performance in universities and has been translated into over seven languages, including Croatian, French, Japanese, Korean, Portuguese, and Spanish.

- Performance Art from Futurism to the Present
- Performance: Live Art Since 1960
- Laurie Anderson
- Performance Now: Live Art for the 21st Century (2018)

== Awards ==
In 2006 Goldberg was named a Chevalier of the Ordre des Arts et des Lettres by the French government.

In 2010 Goldberg was awarded with the ICI Agnes Gund Curatorial Award.

In 2013 Goldberg was ranked 24th on ArtReview's Power 100 list of the most influential figures in the contemporary art world.

== Bibliography ==
- Hughley, Marty (2000). "A Tribute to the Eye of Laurie Anderson." The Oregonian. 18 June.
- Rockwell, John (2004). "Preserve Performance Art?" The New York Times. 30 April.
- Smith, Roberta (2005). "Performance Art Gets Its Biennial." The New York Times. 2 November.
