= The Pictures Generation =

2009 exhibition at The Metropolitan Museum of Art (The Met) in New York City

The Pictures Generation, 1974–1984 was an exhibition at The Metropolitan Museum of Art (The Met) in New York City that ran from April 29 – August 2, 2009. The exhibition took its name from Pictures, a 1977 five person group show organized by art historian and critic Douglas Crimp (1944–2019) at New York City's Artists Space gallery. The artists exhibited from September 24 to October 29, 1977 were Troy Brauntuch, Jack Goldstein, Sherrie Levine, Robert Longo and Philip Smith.

Artists in the 2009 Met exhibition included well known artists of the 1980s such as Cindy Sherman, Barbara Kruger, Louise Lawler, Robert Longo, David Salle, Richard Prince, Laurie Simmons, Jack Goldstein and Sherrie Levine, together with lesser-known contemporaries such as Troy Brauntuch and Michael Zwack. It also featured some of the group's artistic predecessors including John Baldessari and Allan McCollum.

== Precursors ==
In his catalogue essay for the 1977 show and a 1979 expansion of the essay published in the journal October, Crimp outlined a framework to describe shared themes in the work of the five artists he presented. In general, these were an interest in representational imagery, and references to mass media that the artists explored through "processes of quotation, excerptation, framing, and staging."

The Pictures Generation was not the first major exhibition to examine these artists as a distinct group, but it was the first to focus only on this cohort from a scholarly perspective. A Forest of Signs: Art in the Crisis of Representation, a 1989 exhibition at the Museum of Contemporary Art, Los Angeles examined the work of American artists born between 1944 and 1956 who used mass media imagery. Also in 1989, Image World: Art and Media Culture, an exhibition at the Whitney Museum of American Art, examined the role of mass media imagery in contemporary art from the 1950s to the 1980s, with the Pictures Generation artists playing a prominent role.

== Details ==
The Met's show, curated by Douglas Eklund, argued that, from the perspective of three decades later, it is evident that Crimp's observations described a widely shared sensibility among artists of the 1970s and 80s. The exhibition and its accompanying catalogue sought to tell the story of this "Pictures Generation" and explore the ways that these artists developed their approach to art-making. In the main catalogue essay, Elkund focused on three communities where artists shared and refined the concepts that unify the Pictures Generation: The California Institute of the Arts (CalArts) in Los Angeles, Hallwalls in Buffalo and Artists Space.

Artists in the Met exhibition included art stars of the 1980s such as Cindy Sherman, Barbara Kruger, Louise Lawler, Robert Longo, David Salle, Richard Prince, Jack Goldstein and Sherrie Levine, together with lesser-known contemporaries such as Troy Brauntuch and Michael Zwack. It also featured some of the group's artistic predecessors including John Baldessari and Allan McCollum. The artists in Crimp's 1977 show were Troy Brauntuch, Jack Goldstein, Sherrie Levine, Robert Longo and Philip Smith. For the 1979 expansion of his catalogue essay, Crimp deleted Philip Smith and added Cindy Sherman.

As time has gone on, other writers have argued that artists not included in the Metropolitan Museum of Art show, such as Eric Fischl and Julian Schnabel, were a part of this group. Norman Rosenthal, the curator of Schnabel's 2011 retrospective at the Museo Correr in Venice, in that show's catalogue calls the artist "a leader and an outsider of the so-called Pictures Generation". Gary Indiana has proposed further artists as having been part of this group despite the exclusion of their work from the Metropolitan Museum's exhibition, including Walter Robinson.

A few artists grouped under the "Pictures Generation" category, such as Sherrie Levine and Richard Prince, have been involved in legal disputes concerning their appropriation of content protected by intellectual property laws, particularly copyright law.

== Artists in the Metropolitan Museum of Art exhibition ==
- John Baldessari
- Ericka Beckman
- Dara Birnbaum
- Barbara Bloom
- Eric Bogosian
- Glenn Branca
- Troy Brauntuch
- James Casebere
- Sarah Charlesworth
- Rhys Chatham
- Charles Clough
- Nancy Dwyer
- Jack Goldstein
- Barbara Kruger
- Louise Lawler
- Thomas Lawson
- Sherrie Levine
- Robert Longo
- Allan McCollum
- Paul McMahon
- MICA-TV (Carole Ann Klonarides & Michael Owen)
- Matt Mullican
- Richard Prince
- David Salle
- Cindy Sherman
- Laurie Simmons
- Michael Smith
- James Welling
- Michael Zwack

== Legacy ==
During the fall of 2020 into the winter of 2021 the Metropolitan Museum has produced a follow-up exhibition on the occasion of the ten year anniversary of The Pictures Generation, titled Pictures Revisited. This second show focuses on "appropriation" and features the work of five artists from the original exhibition as well of that of other artists whose careers began both before and after the Pictures Generation practitioners' did.

== See also ==
- Criticism of capitalism
- Remix culture
- Pop art
- Spiritual America
