= Charles Clough (artist) =

American painter

Charles Sidney Clough (born February 2, 1951, in Buffalo, New York) is an American painter. His art has been exhibited in over 70 solo and over 150 group exhibitions throughout North America and Europe and is included in the permanent collections of over 70 museums, including the Metropolitan Museum of Art, National Gallery of Art, and Smithsonian American Art Museum. Clough has received fellowships and grants from the New York State Council on the Arts, National Endowment for the Arts, Adolph and Esther Gottlieb Foundation, the Pollock-Krasner Foundation, and the John Simon Guggenheim Foundation.

== Early life and education ==
Charles Clough was born and raised in Buffalo, New York, where he attended Hutchinson Central Technical High School. He then attended Pratt Institute in Brooklyn from 1969 to 1970 where the two-dimensional design teacher Joseph Phillips, introduced Artforum magazine to him. Clough dropped out and on January 5, 1971, decided that he would devote his life to art. He traded his sculptor's assistant services for studio space with artist Larry W. Griffis Jr., at the Ashford Hollow Foundation's 30 Essex Street former ice-house facility. From 1971-1972 he attended the Ontario College of Art and was introduced to the artists and galleries of Toronto, Ontario, Canada. He observed closely the organization of A-Space, a not-for-profit gallery which exhibited emerging artists. This model along with that of Artists Space in New York provided the example that Clough followed in forming Hallwalls Center for Contemporary Art.

By 1973 many of the University at Buffalo's and Buffalo State's art professors had rented studios at 30 Essex Street. One of these, Joseph Panone, brought his student, Robert Longo and introduced him to Clough, which resulted in the program of exhibitions and artists' visits which became Hallwalls in 1974. Larry W. Griffis Jr. and the Ashford Hollow Foundation shared its space and its Internal Revenue Service's 501 c3 status to seek and be awarded grants by the National Endowment for the Arts and New York State Council on the Arts. Artists whose works were presented during the early years of Hallwalls include, amongst others Vito Acconci, Kathy Acker, Laurie Anderson, Lynda Benglis, Ross Bleckner, Barbara Bloom, Eric Bogosian, Jonathan Borofsky, Chris Burden, Robert Creeley, Eric Fischl, Philip Glass, Jack Goldstein, Dan Graham, Robert Irwin, Sol LeWitt, Robert Mangold, Malcolm Morley, David Salle, Julian Schnabel and Michael Snow.

In 1978 after separating Hallwalls from the Ashford Hollow Foundation, establishing its board of directors and obtaining its own 501 c3 status, Clough returned to New York City to pursue his art.

== Artwork ==
Clough has said, of his artwork, "What I like most about painting, all kinds of painting, is that it ain't what it looks like. Not that it's simply an illusion. I like the contradiction, that my things can have an old master look, the look of Abstract Expressionism and a look of shiny smoothness. I like those paradoxes—flatness and its opposite, the way the photo reveals and the paint conceals. Shuffling and reshuffling, then adding another deck and reshuffling that."

In his autobiographical book of images, Pepfog Clufff, Clough has written of the period following his commitment to art that: "my examination of impulses, desires, and intentions finally began to coalesce in my journal-like Studio Notes with which I have developed the themes and procedures which articulate my meanings to this day. At that point I had abandoned illustrational strategies for paint-as-material processes, generally, as established by Pollock and his progeny. My wood carving gave way to making maquettes for Tony Smith-like sculptures. My photographs reflected Walker Evans on the one hand and Jan Dibbets on the other."

Pepfog Clufff includes the following categories of works: 1. The Arrow 2. The Composites 3. Flung, Stroked, Squeegeed, and Ground 4. The Studio Notes 5. The Photo Reveals and the Paint Conceals 6. Clouds 7. Paint Creatures 8. Male and Female 9. Group Portraits 10.The History of Foolish Hope 11. Old Masters and Utopias 12. C-notes 13. Display Models 14. The Airbrush Detour 15. The Big Finger 16. The Vortices 17. Sun Wei 18. Arena Painting 19. The Stereos 20. Sticks and Stones 21. The Polychromes 22. Tinnitus and the Movies 23. Caesura 24. The Zodiac Conclusion 25. The Zodiac Macros 26. The Terminal Painting 27. Stream 28. The Tributaries 29. The Westerly Sculpture 30. The Books 31. The Segue 32. Pepfog.

Pepfog Clufff includes "Chance and Choice," Clough's statement of concerns, excerpted here: "My subject is a web of metaphysical categories including: 1. Unity: wholeness, integrity, fragmentation, connectedness, and cosmic parameters. 2. Identity: similarities and differences, sums of distinguishing characteristics, units of consciousness and processes of projection, introjection, and transference. 3. Freedom: the fixed limits of nature, the shifting limits of society, the free exchange of ideas, and the boundless imagination. 4. Creation: the process of nature as a metaphor for thought and action and the correlation of form and content to establish the symbolic realm. 5. Truth: the limits of nature, the nature of belief, and the interpretation of the ambiguous. 6. Utopia: progress or a timeless ideal, perfect moments or a state of grace. 7. Nothingness: death, oblivion, the absolute, the infinite and/or the unimaginable."

Beginning in 1978 Herbert and Dorothy Vogel (New York City) began collecting Clough's art and since then acquired over four hundred works, many of which were distributed to a museum in each of the fifty (United) States through a project implemented by the National Gallery of Art (Washington). Clough has been awarded grants by National Endowment for the Arts (1982, 1989), New York State Council on the Arts (1983) and the Pollock-Krasner Foundation (2009). [1] His work was included in The Metropolitan Museum of Art's The Pictures Generation, 1974–84, from April 21-August 2, 2009.

As of July, 2015 Clough established his studio, and the Clufffalo Institute, on the Roycroft Campus in East Aurora, New York, outside of Buffalo, New York.

== Personal life ==
Charles Clough is married to book designer Liz Trovato, and they are the parents of Edward George Clough (b. 1980) and Nicolas Henry Clough (b. 1982).
