= Nancy Dwyer =

American contemporary artist

- Born: 1954 (age 70–71); New York City
- Website: www.nancydwyer.com

Nancy Dwyer (born 1954) is an American contemporary artist whose works include paintings, works on paper, public art, word sculpture and furniture art. Her work has been exhibited widely at venues including the Whitney Museum of American Art, the Museum of Contemporary Art, Los Angeles, the Contemporary Arts Museum in Houston, the New Museum in New York and many others. Her work was included in the 2009 exhibition “The Pictures Generation” (of which she is considered to be a member) at the Metropolitan Museum of Art in New York, alongside the work of her peers and contemporaries, including Cindy Sherman and Robert Longo, with whom she cofounded Hallwalls in Buffalo, New York in 1974, as well as work by Barbara Kruger, Richard Prince, John Baldessari, Louise Lawler and Sherrie Levine, among others.

== Early life and education ==
Dwyer was born in New York City in 1954. She studied at the State University of New York at New Paltz (1972-1974), the Empire State College “Studio Program” in New York (1975), and completed her Bachelor of Fine Arts at the University at Buffalo (1974-1976). She completed a master's degree in Interactive Telecommunications at New York University in 2002. She is currently an Associate Professor of Sculpture at the University of Vermont in Burlington, Vermont.

== Career ==
Dwyer is considered a core member of what art historians call "The Pictures Generation", a loose generational grouping of artists who came of age around the mid-1970s. Many of them, like Dwyer, Sherman and Longo, were associated with Hallwalls in Buffalo. Their early work, in particular, is typically characterized by their critical appropriation of images from the mainstream media. Dwyer and her contemporaries approached the image-saturated pop cultural landscape with a sense of suspicion and irony, even black comedy. Dwyer's own early series Cardz (1980), for example, was created from an archive the artist had assembled of magazine clippings, advertisements and news stories purporting to depict “everyday life.” Dwyer distilled from these images a set of twenty-six line drawings that at once defamiliarizes them from their original, often commercial, publishing context and at the same time transforms them into an impersonal catalog of expressive gesture, universal and yet unmistakably the artist's own. These line drawings were screen printed onto a set of twenty-six “cards” on laminated leatherette paper, returning the images as objects into circulation, albeit one profoundly transformed.

In the mid-1980s Dwyer turned to what she calls “word sculptures,” drawing on her expertise as a one-time commercial sign maker to craft punchy, often darkly comedic pieces that provide Dwyer with a vehicle for her critical take on contemporary American society, mores and messaging. A recent example of this sort of work is BIG EGO II (2010), a huge inflatable sculpture spelling out the word “ego” in bloated, vulnerable-looking letters made from bright yellow nylon. An earlier example of this type of work is Dwyer's KILLER (1991), which consists of a large, lacquered aluminum table, that seen from above, spells out the title of the piece in a violent-looking sans serif font.

Dwyer is also notable for being the only subject in one of Cindy Sherman's Untitled Film Stills that is not Sherman herself. The photograph in question is Untitled Film Still #7 (1978): Dwyer is the woman in the sun hat. A line drawing by Dwyer was used for the cover of Hall & Oates' Rock 'n Soul Part 1 (1983).

== Exhibitions ==
Dwyer's first solo exhibition was at Hallwalls in Buffalo, in 1977.

In 1980 Dwyer's early work was included in the “Hallwalls: 5 Years” exhibition; originally exhibited at the Parsons School of Design, the exhibition then traveled to; the Contemporary Arts Museum, Houston, the University of Colorado Museum in Boulder; the Albright-Knox Art Gallery in Buffalo, New York and the Renaissance Society at the University of Chicago.

As well as having her work included in group exhibitions at the New Museum in New York (Fluxattitudes, 1992; Bad Girls 1994), Dwyer's work has been exhibited at White Columns (1982), The Drawing Center (1979, 1982), and Artists Space (1976, 1980, 1985) in New York, as well as the Brooklyn Museum (1985), the Birmingham Museum of Art (1985), the Museum of Contemporary Art Chicago (1987), the Sao Paulo Biennial (1983) and Whitney Biennial (1987). Her work has been shown at the Metro Pictures Gallery (1981, 1985, 1986), among many visual venues.

Dwyer's work was included in the major exhibition “Laughter Ten Years After,” which featured pieces by twenty artists, including Sherman, Kruger, the Guerilla Girls, Carrie Mae Weems and Jenny Holzer. The exhibition toured North America for three years (1995-1998).

In 2013, the Fisher Landau Center for Art in Long Island City, New York, hosted a major solo retrospective of Dwyer's work titled “Painting & Sculpture, 1982-2012.” New York Times critic Ken Johnson suggested that Dwyer's Desk of Envy, a mahogany desk-shaped word sculpture that, when viewed from above spells out “envy” in large, aggressive letters, be added to “a short list of artworks emblematic of the 1980s, including Jeff Koons’s ‘Rabbit’ and Barbara Kruger's montage ‘I Shop Therefore I Am.” Critic Robert Pincus-Witten reviewed the exhibition in the pages of Artforum, writing that while “Dwyer never became as well known as some of her peers,” the retrospective of her work at the Fisher Landau center “must be regarded as a vivifying corrective to the unwarranted quiet surrounding works so conspicuous by their wit, craft, and serious import.”
