= Annette Lemieux =

American artist (born 1957)

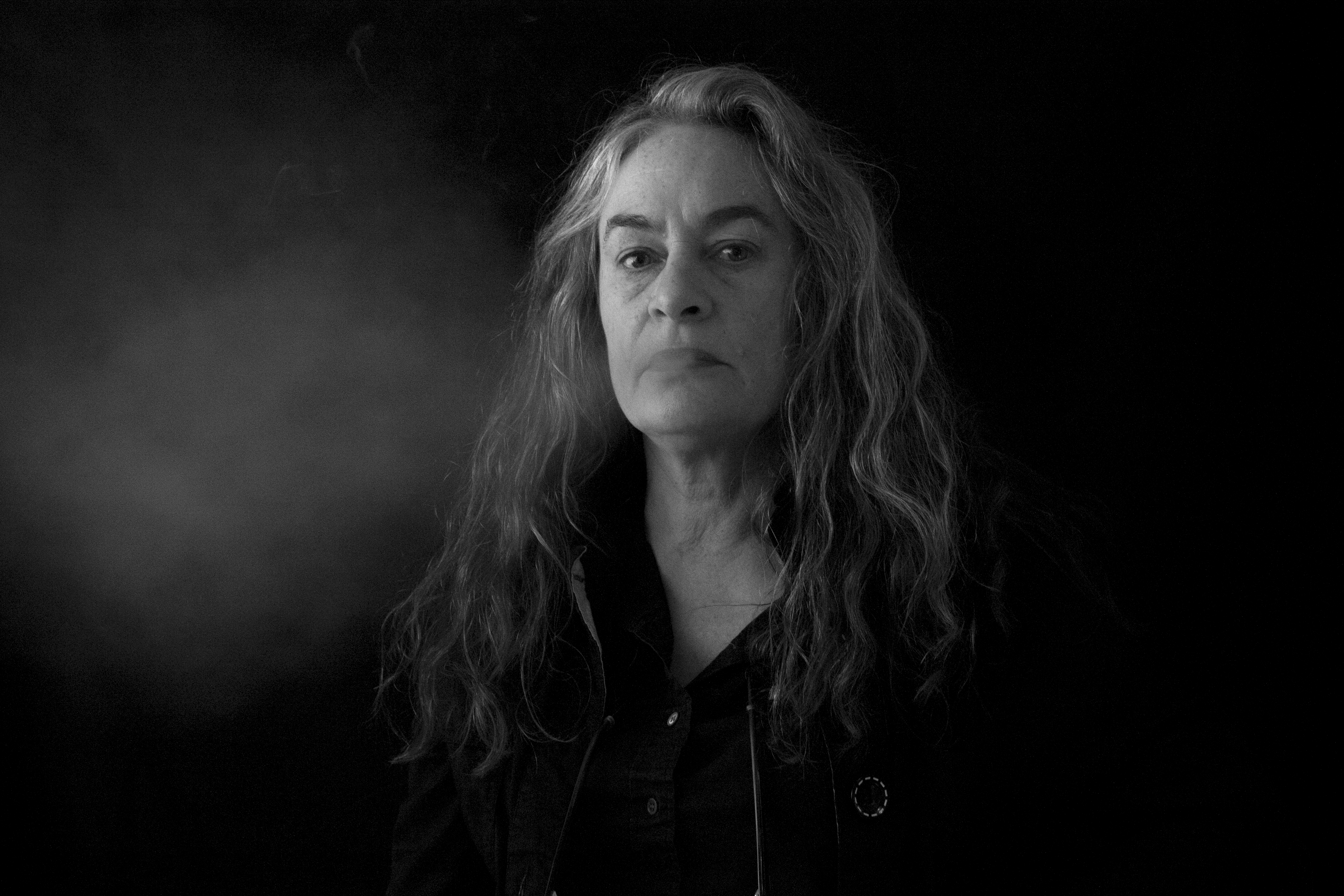
- Annette Lemieux, 2015. Photo by Elyse Harary.
- Born: 1957 (age 68–69); Norfolk, Virginia
- Movement: Pictures Generation
- Website: http://annettelemieux.net/

Annette Lemieux (born 1957 in Norfolk, Virginia) is an American artist who emerged in the early 1980s along with the "picture theory" artists (David Salle, Jack Goldstein, Cindy Sherman, Barbara Kruger, Richard Prince). Lemieux brought to the studio a discipline equally based on introspection, and the manifestations of an ideological minimalism. Process is a key component in the execution of her works over the past three decades, creating the lure to the confrontation of issues of social and historical urgency. Lemieux has been the recipient of awards from the National Endowment of the Arts and the Keiser Wilhelm Museum, Germany and an honorary Doctorate in Fine Arts from Montserrat College of Art. Presently, in addition to her studio and exhibition schedule, she is a senior lecturer at Harvard University in the area of visual and environmental studies.

== Early life ==
Annette Rose Lemieux was born in Norfolk, Virginia. Her father Joseph was in the Marines, and the family lived in a house close to the base. When Lemieux's father was called overseas, her mother, Margaret, moved with their two daughters – Annette and Suzette – to her hometown of Torrington, Connecticut; her parents would later divorce. Later on, she received her Bachelor of Fine Arts in painting from Hartford Art School University of Hartford in Connecticut.

== Work ==
In early works like It's a Wonderful Life, 1986 [named after the 1946 Frank Capra film], Lemieux incorporated multiple forms of popular media to create a narrative in the form of self-doubt, personal vulnerability, along with an awareness of the absurdist political/religious/economic histories we accumulate as a civilization in a never-ending current. Following the legacies of Robert Rauschenberg and John Cage, she works to narrow the gap between "art" and "life". Lemieux's works resist the traps of a "signature style", and she has referred to her shows looking more like group shows rather than a single artist's. Her work surprises us, challenges her audience to keep up, and resists the conformity of the brand. As stated by Peggy Phelan, "For Lemieux, the art object offers her thoughts and feelings a way to travel . . . Art is her way of responding, both publicly and intimately, to the ongoing predicament of our lives".

Lemieux works from a repertoire of real objects and images from films and books featuring reproductions of historical photographs from the forties and fifties, which she calls her "landscape". Her practice reflects a deep commitment to content and well as process, incorporating intellectual analyses of social codes with an emphasis on psychological and emotional content. Fundamentally interdisciplinary in content and form, Lemieux's work is a continual exploration and explication of our cultural constructs and how objects that reflect the self define the self within the culture. In her review of Lemieux's major retrospective "The Strange Life of Objects," Elizabeth Michelman explains that, "[In] addressing her content-laden material systematically, not sentimentally, Lemieux places objects and images in predicaments that are highly structured and memorable. In both two- and three-dimensional formats, she appropriates and wittily recontextualizes furnishings, texts and photographs rescued from history, popular culture and personal records."

In her recent show entitled Unfinished Business at the Carpenter Center, Harvard University, Lemieux explored the territory between object, mediated memory, personal experience and cultural history that has informed her practice for three decades. Lemieux's objects and imagery derive directly from the world as it exists, not from the recesses of a private imagination that must search itself to produce the substance of invented images. With representative examples of her work in over 50 public collections, Lemieux has been the focus of two recent exhibitions organized by the Krannert Art Museum and Harvard University.

In 2017, awarded with the Maud Morgan Prize Lemieux had the space to exhibit her work at the Museum of Fine Arts Boston. In an article about the exhibition, Lemieux remarks that she did not intend for her work to come out as political commentary, but due to the current political climate after the United States 2016 elections, viewers could not help but feel their current worries and the tensions reflected in Lemieux's work. Lemieux remarked that what she creates are "duets," taking objects from different places and times and blending them together, leaving her 2017 exhibit, "hair-raising polarity between peril and play."

Lemieux has also revised her works as the Global Correspondent reported, "The Day after the election last November, Lemieux e-emailed the Whitney Museum of America Art and instructed them to upend her piece 'Left Right Left Right." The raised fists in 30 photolithography now point downward." As Lemieux remarked that she created the piece in a time of optimism and felt that the piece needed reflect the time rather than a past moment.

Lemieux is represented by Elizabeth Dee Gallery in New York.

In 2022, the Venezuelan curator Mario Pérez invited her to intervene the deteriorated basements of the Residential Complex of Parque Central in Caracas where she recreated a zen garden, the piece was called Dry Garden, an ephemeral installation which was latter recreated in the second stage of the event at the Museum of Fine Arts of Caracas during the first edition of the project titled Without Stars, the show included Meyer Vaisman, Nikola Uzunovski, Régulo Pérez, Eduardo Azuaje and Mario Pérez.

In 2024, Annette Lemieux participated in Without Stars 2, the show took place at the Experimental Exhibition Room of the Museum of fine Arts of Caracas, it was completely illuminated with emergency lamps and included the work titled No words/Sin palabras. The exhibition included Kishio Suga, Meyer Vaisman, Annette Lemieux, Eduardo Azuaje and Mario Pérez who also curated the project.

== Collections ==
Lemieux's work can be found in the permanent collections of numerous art museums, including Museum of Modern Art, New York; Metropolitan Museum of Art, New York; Whitney Museum of American Art; Solomon R. Guggenheim Museum, New York; Hirshhorn Museum, Washington; Walker Art Center, Minneapolis; Yale University Art Gallery, New Haven; Fogg Art Museum, Harvard University; Worcester Art Museum, Worcester MA; Museum of Fine Arts Boston; The Art Institute Chicago, as well as many other museums throughout the world. Additionally, she has received awards and grants from the National Endowment for the Arts, the Kaiser Wilhelm Museum, the Museum of Fine Arts Boston, as well as other institutions. In 2009, received an honorary Doctorate in Fine Arts from Montserrat College of Art as well.

== Recent Solo exhibitions ==
- Annette Lemieux. Broken, Mazzoli Gallery, Berlin, Germany (2019)
- Mise en scène. Museum of Fine Arts Boston (2017)
- Past Present. Elizabeth Dee Gallery, New York, (2016)
- Everybody wants to be a catchy tune. Kent Fine Art, New York, (2015)

== Literature ==
- Heynen, Julian. Ein Ort der denkt. Stuttgart: Krefelder Kunstmuseen, 2000.
- Hillstrom, Laurie C, and Kevin Hillstrom. Contemporary Women Artists. Detroit: St. James Press, 1999.
- Homburg, C. The Matter of History. St. Louis, Missouri: Washington University Gallery of Art.
- Janson, H.W. The History of Art. New York: Harry N. Abrams, Inc. 4th and 5th editions, 1991, 2009.
- Lafo, Rachel R, Nicholas J. Capasso, and Jennifer Uhrhane. Painting in Boston: 1950–2000. Lincoln, Mass: DeCordova Museum and Sculpture Park, 2002, pp. 111, 170, 198–200, 217, 230, 244.
- Le, Thorel-Daviot P. Contemporary Artist 500. Paris: Larousse-Bordas, 1996.
- "Lemieux, Annette | Biography". www.mutualart.com. Retrieved 2020-03-10.
- Lemieux, Annette. Memoirs of a Survivor. San Francisco, Calif.: ZG Publications, 1989.
- Lemieux, Annette, Lelia Amalfitano, Judith H. Fox, Rosetta Brooks, Peggy Phelan, Robert Pincus-Witten, and Lucy Flint-Gohlke. The Strange Life of Objects: The Art of Annette Lemieux. Champaign, Ill: Krannert Art Museum and Kinkead Pavilion, 2010.
- Lucie-Smith, Edward. Art Today. Phaidon Press Limited, 1995, ill. p. 323.
- Miller, Dana, Salvo D. M. De, and Joseph Giovannini. Legacy: The Emily Fisher Landau Collection. New York: Whitney Museum of American Art, 2011, pp. 158 – 161.
- Moos, David. Annette Lemieux: Time To Go. Modena, Italy: Emilio Mazzoli Galleria d'arte contemporanea, 1994.
- Morgan, Jessica. Collectors Collect Contemporary: 1990–99. Boston: Institute of Contemporary Art, Boston, 1999.
- Neidhardt, Jane E. and Lorin Cuoco. The Dual Muse, The Writer As Artist – The Artist As Writer. St. Louis: Washington University Gallery of Art, 1997.
- Oliva, Achille Bonito. Superart. Milan: Giancarlo Politi, 1988, ill. pp. 42, 48, 116–118.
- Paneque, Guillermo. Entre Chien Et Loup: Works from the Meana Larrucea Collection. Madrid: Iberdrola, 2011, pp. 202, 220 – 221.
- Peters, Thomas J. Reinventing Work: The Brand You 50, Or, Fifty Ways to Transform Yourself from an Employee into a Brand That Shouts Distinction, Commitment, and Passion! New York: Knopf, 1999.
- Philbrick, Harry and Princenthal, Nancy. Landscape Reclaimed: New Approaches to an Artistic Tradition. Ridgefield, CT: The
- Prather, Marla. History of Modern Art. New York: Harry N. Abrams, Inc., 1996, 1998.
- Princenthal, Nancy, and Jennifer Dowley. A Creative Legacy: A History of the National Endowment for the Arts Visual Artists' Fellowship Program, 1966–1995. New York: H.N. Abrams with the National Endowment for the Arts, 2001, pp. 148, 183.
- Richer, Francesca, and Matthew Rosenzweig. No. 1: First Works by 362 Artists. New York: D.A.P./Distributed Art Publishers, 2005, p. 214.
- Romano, Gianni. Crisis and Desire. Post Media. Milan, Italy, 1995.
- Rosenthal, Mark. Abstraction In the Twentieth Century: Total Risk. New York: The Solomon R. Guggenheim Museum, 1996, ill.p. 233.
- Schor, Mira. Wet: On Painting, Feminism, and Art Culture. Durham, NC: Duke University Press, 1997.
- Schjeldahl, Peter. Columns and Catalogues. "Annette Lemieux." Great Barrington, MA: The Figures, 1994.
- Sorin, Gretchen S, Helen M. Shannon, and Dr W. L. Leonard. In the Spirit of Martin: The Living Legacy of Dr. Martin Luther King Jr. Atlanta, Georgia: Tinwood, 2001, ill. p. 197.
- Vergino, Lea. From Junk to Art. California :Museoi Arte Moderna e Contemporanea di Trento e Rovereto, Gingko Press Inc, 1997.
- Wolf, Sylvia. Visions from America: Photographs from the Whitney Museum of American Art, 1940–2001. Munich; New York: Prestel, 2002, p. 156.
