= Michael Zwack =

American artist

- Born: 1949; Buffalo, New York, U.S.
- Died: May 5, 2017 (aged 67); New York City, New York, U.S.
- Occupation(s): American artist; co-founder of Hallwalls Gallery

Michael Zwack (1949 – May 5, 2017) was an American artist most often associated with The Pictures Generation.

He studied sculpture at Buffalo State College and later, with artists such as Robert Longo and Cindy Sherman, he co-founded the Hallwalls Gallery, a space run by a non-profit organization of the same name (still open today) in his hometown. Then as did many of his immediate contemporaries he relocated to New York City in the midst of its burgeoning art scene. His work has been the subject of solo exhibitions at such galleries as Metro Pictures and Paul Kasmin Gallery in New York and Thaddaeus Ropac in Salzburg, Austria, and was included in The Pictures Generation exhibition in 2009 at the Metropolitan Museum of Art curated by Douglas Eklund.

Writing in the February 1996 edition of Artforum, Rosetta Brooks said of his exhibition at Thomas Soloman's Garage:

"Part of a generation of artists in the early '80s who appropriated mass media imagery, Zwack reconsiders the impact of the photographic on our way of seeing. He mines the photograph's ability to capture the fugitive, to reveal the unexpected, and to create a reverberative depth, celebrating the slow metamorphic quality of the natural world and our apprehension of it. For him, the image is a cipher of the archetypal, a vessel that has the power to hold echoes of an ancestral voice. Echoing the floating, phenomenal worlds that characterize the Japanese painting tradition, Zwack's work encourages a contemplative, almost trancelike relationship to the phenomenal world"...

Zwack died in New York City on May 5, 2017, due to lung cancer. He was 67.
