= Just Buffalo Literary Center =

Just Buffalo Literary Center (JBLC) is a not-for-profit literary organization centered in Buffalo, NY which serves the greater Western New York region as a literary curator.

Just Buffalo Literary Center is located above the Western New York Book Arts Center on Washington Street.

== History ==
=== Inception ===
Just Buffalo began in 1975 when founder Debora Ott hosted a reading featuring Diane di Prima at the Allentown Community Center. In the following years, notable authors and poets such as Robert Creeley, Ed Dorn, Alice Notley, Maureen Owen, and Ted Berrigan came to Buffalo to participate in readings offered by what had by then become "Just Buffalo". The organization proceeded to host writing workshops for writers of all ages and published a literary magazine. It also had a radio show.

=== Continued growth ===
In 1982, Just Buffalo Literary Center established its renowned Writers in Education program, providing in-school creative writing programs for young people. At its peak, this program served approximately 4,000 students per year. After more than two decades of stewarding community-based literary programs and establishing Just Buffalo Literary Center as a national presence on the literary scene, Debora left the organization in 1998. She hired Michael Kelleher as artistic director in the months before she left. Ed Taylor served as executive director from 1998-2001.

=== 2002-present ===
Laurie Dean Torrell took over as executive director in 2002, ushering in a new era. During her tenure, Just Buffalo Literary Center moved from the Tri-Main Center to the Market Arcade Building in 2005, a change that marked the beginning of an administrative collaboration with CEPA and Big Orbit Galleries. In 2016, Just Buffalo Literary Center moved from the Market Arcade Building to its current home on the second floor at the corner of Washington and Mohawk in downtown Buffalo.

== Programs ==
=== BABEL ===
BABEL is an international literary lecture series that brings notable authors to Buffalo to speak four times per year. It is co-sponsored by Hallwalls. It was conceived in 2006 by Michael Kelleher, who was at the time Just Buffalo's artistic director. The series was launched in 2007. Past authors have included Nobel Prize winners Orhan Pamuk, Derek Walcott and V.S. Naipaul, as well as global literary icons Isabel Allende, Amos Oz, Salman Rushdie, A.S. Byatt, Chinua Achebe and many others.

BABEL was initially hosted in folk-musician Ani Difranco's recording space, "Babeville", in the old Asbury Delaware United Methodist Church, until it outgrew the space late in its second season and moved to Kleinhans Music Hall.

In 2009, BABEL was awarded "Most Innovative Arts Programming (any artform)" by Buffalo Spree Magazine.

The BABEL series has been hailed by the Buffalo News as:

...one of the most exciting literary series Buffalo has ever seen.

In describing BABEL in its first year, Kelleher states:

The idea of the series is really to bring global perspective to the literary discussion in Buffalo.
