= Hallwalls =

Non-profit art organization

Coordinates: 42.89369°N 78.87530°W

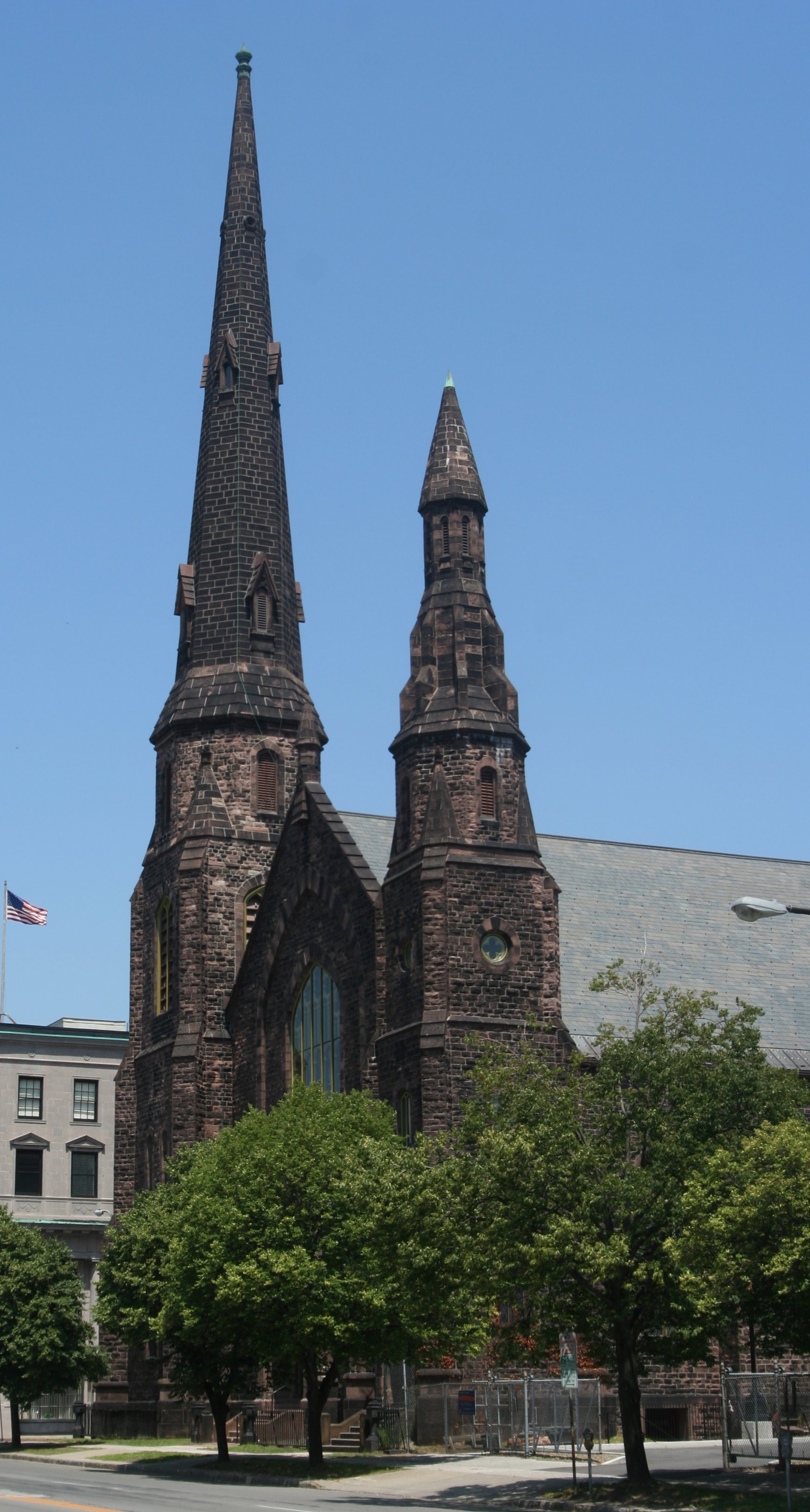
Babeville, former Asbury Delaware Methodist Church, now home to Righteous Babe Records and the Hallwalls Contemporary Arts Center.

Hallwalls Contemporary Arts Center (aka Hallwalls) is a non-profit art organization located in Buffalo, New York. Since 1974, Hallwalls has shown and shows the work of contemporary artists of diverse backgrounds who work in film, video, literature, music, performance, media and the visual arts. The ideology behind Hallwalls has always been: "Hallwalls provides direct access to developing ideas in Art for Western New York and Southern Ontario. This is accomplished through exhibitions, a visiting Artist/Critic program, and correspondence with other organizations involved with recent art in the United States, Canada and Europe.". “Hallwalls came into existence through a convergence of factors. Initiated by the ambitious friendship of (Charles) Clough and (Robert) Longo, fueled by new state funding to alternative spaces, and embraced by a hungry Buffalo arts community, it rapidly picked up speed and girth as it tumbled onto existence." Hallwalls describes its mission as supporting the creation and presentation of new work in visual, media, performing, and literary arts, while making this work available to the public.

== History ==
Hallwalls was established by Charles Clough, Robert Longo, Diane Bertolo, Nancy Dwyer, Larry Lundy, Cindy Sherman, Joseph Panone, Linda Brooks, Pierce Kamke, and Michael Zwack in 1974 in a converted ice packing warehouse, the Essex Art Center, which had been converted into studios for artists. The gallery's odd moniker actually commemorates its founding relationship by naming the space that the friendship transformed. The ‘walls’ in question ran the length of the ‘hall’ that separated, or, from the perspective of the new alliance, united the studios of Clough and Longo.

The focus of Hallwalls since its inception has been to produce a space that will accommodate artists from diverse backgrounds. Works from varying mediums, which include film, video, performance art, music, painting, photography, and sculpture, have come together since the beginning, to confront the prevailing social issues of contemporary culture.

In the 1980s, Hallwalls moved to 700 Main Street. During this time, the curators found it increasingly difficult to counterbalance the initial intentions of the founders, which were to create a space where artists could freely show works that were not creations sponsored or funded by corporate interests, and grow as an arts institution that could serve the largest possible audience. Funding increases allowed for a larger gallery space in the 700 Main Street complex, as well as opportunities for more artists to show their work in the gallery, but required the input and compensation of more staff and organizers.

Funding has been a consistent issue, but Hallwalls has been able to survive. Despite severe cuts in the 1990s, Hallwalls has remained a strong presence in the Western New York community.

In January 2006, Hallwalls moved into its new home, which it shares with Righteous Babe Records, at 341 Delaware Ave., in a former Asbury Methodist Church, purchased by Ani DiFranco.

A catalog of some of the films shown at Hallwalls are archived at The Poetry Collection at the University at Buffalo.

Some of the performers who have performed at Hallwalls include: Kathy Acker, Glenn Branca, Fifth Column, The Kipper Kids, Ann Magnuson, Christian Marclay, Harvey Pekar, Richard Serra and Karen Finley.

== Babel ==
The annual literary festival, Babel, which Hallwalls co-sponsors, featured a reading by Michael Ondaatje, the winner of the 1992 Man Booker Prize for The English Patient, in 2008. Hallwalls also collaborates with other non-profit organizations in Western New York. Since 1986, ARTGREASE, both Hallwalls' and Squeaky Wheel's shared timeslot on Buffalo Public-access television cable TV, Channel 20, has given the institution a chance to serve the community with its half-hour television program, Artwaves. Hallwalls also co-sponsors, along with organizations Just Buffalo Literary Center, Gay & Lesbian Youth Services of WNY, and Compass House, Spotlight on Youth, an open-mic poetry program dedicated to young poets and artists in Buffalo.

== Gallery ==
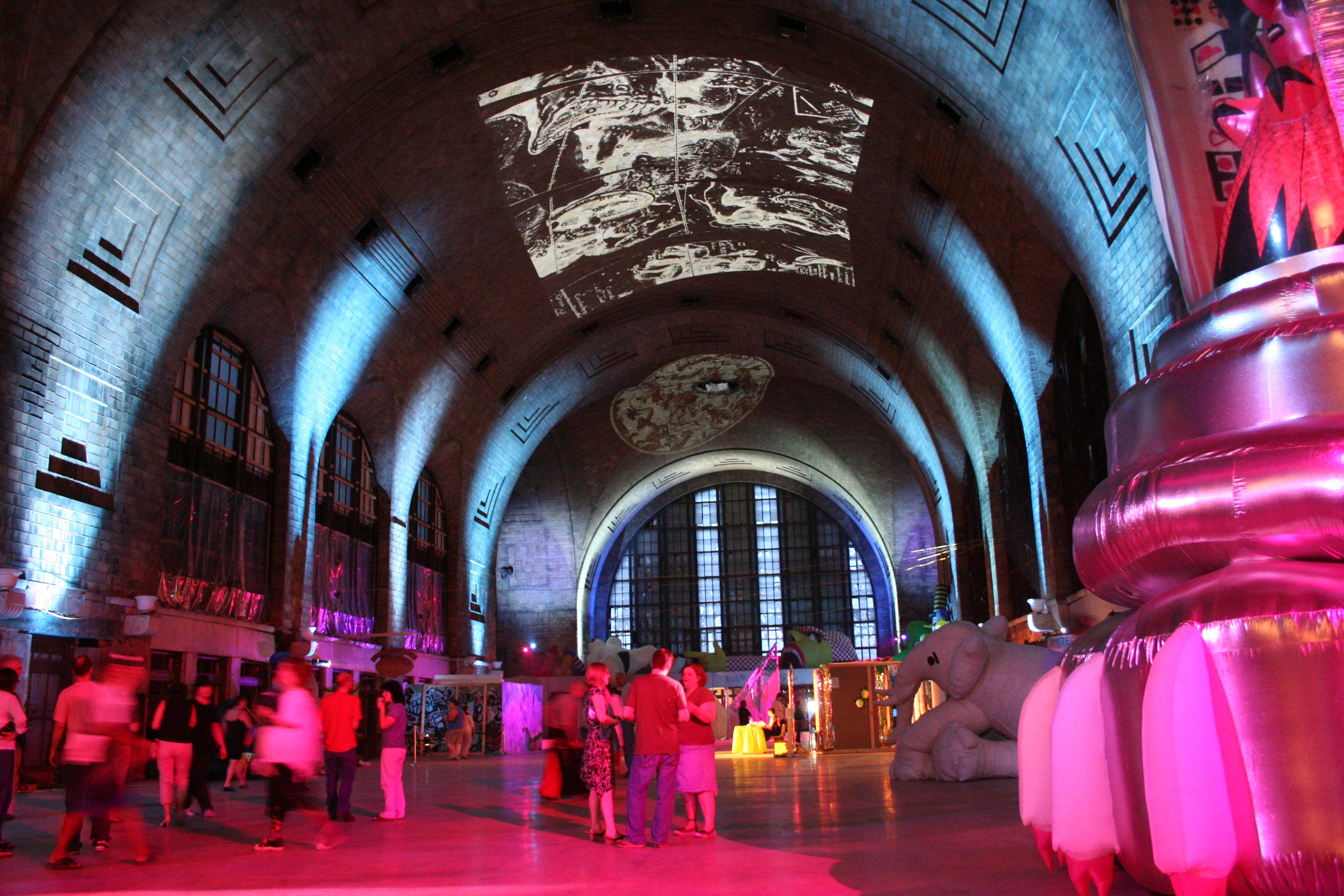
Artists and Models fundraiser event in the Buffalo Central Terminal, 2007
