= Troy Brauntuch =

American artist (born 1954)

- Born: 1954 (age 71–72); Jersey City, New Jersey, U.S.
- Education: California Institute of the Arts (BFA)
- Occupation: Artist

Troy Brauntuch (born 1954 in Jersey City, New Jersey) is an American artist known for his association with the Pictures Generation, a group of artists who came to prominence in the 1970s and 1980s exploring the relationship between images, media, and meaning. He currently teaches at the University of Texas, and previously was an adjunct professor at Columbia University.

== Biography ==
Brauntuch received his Bachelor of Fine Arts degree in 1975 from the California Institute of the Arts in Valencia, California. He first gained recognition in 1977 as a participant in the influential Pictures exhibition at Artists Space in New York City, which included artists such as Sherrie Levine, Robert Longo, and Jack Goldstein.

In the following decades, Brauntuch exhibited widely in major national and international exhibitions. His work was in two group shows in 1982, including the Il Biennale di Venezia in Venice and documenta 7 in Kassel. In 1983, his work was featured in Back to the USA at Kunstmuseum Luzern in Lucerne, and Modern Nude Paintings: 1880–1980 at the National Museum of Art in Osaka. In 1984, he was included in An International Survey of Recent Painting and Sculpture at the Museum of Modern Art in New York, as well as Content at the Hirshhorn Museum and Sculpture Garden in Washington, D.C.

Throughout the 1980s and 1990s, Brauntuch's work appeared in exhibitions such as Avant-Garde in the ’80s (1987, Los Angeles County Museum of Art), Art for Your Collection (1988, Museum of Art, Rhode Island School of Design), Prospect ’89 (1989, Schirn Kunsthalle, Frankfurt), and Nocturnal Visions in Contemporary Painting (1989, Whitney Museum of American Art at Equitable Center, New York). He continued to exhibit internationally with shows such as Art Meets Science and Spirituality in a Changing Economy (1990, Museum Fodor, Amsterdam), American Art of the 80’s (1991, Palazzo delle Albere, Trento), and Glaube-Hoffnung-Liebe-Tod (1995, Kunsthalle Wien, Vienna).

In the late 1990s and 2000s, Brauntuch was included in Fast Forward (1998, Kunstverein in Hamburg), Texas Draws (1999, Museum of Contemporary Art, Houston), and Modern Art Despite Modernism (2000, Museum of Modern Art, New York). He was a recipient of a Joan Mitchell Foundation Grant in 1999 and awarded a Guggenheim Fellowship in 2010.

Brauntuch’s work was also featured in key survey exhibitions such as Drawing from the Modern 1975–2005 (2006, MoMA), The Pictures Generation, 1974–1984 (2009, Metropolitan Museum of Art), and Day for Night: Whitney Biennial 2006 (Whitney Museum of American Art, New York). Additional group exhibitions include Time Again (2011, SculptureCenter, Long Island City), In the Crack of Dawn (2014, LUMA/Westbau Zurich), and The Illusion of Light (2014, Palazzo Grassi, Venice).

In recent years, his work has been included in Where Art Might Happen: The Early Years of CalArts (2019, Kestner Gesellschaft, Hannover; 2020, Kunsthaus Graz, Graz). He continues to exhibit with Petzel Gallery in New York, including solo exhibitions such as A Strange New Beauty in 2020.

He shows at Friedrich Petzel Gallery in New York, and Mai 36 Gallery in Zurich, Switzerland.His work is in the Museum of Modern Art. He lives in Austin, Texas.

== Awards ==
- Guggenheim Fellowship (2010)
- National Endowment for the Arts Grants
- Joan Mitchell Foundation Grant (1999)
