= David Salle =

American painter

- Born: September 28, 1952 (age 73); Norman, Oklahoma, US
- Education: California Institute of the Arts (BFA 1973, MFA 1975)
- Known for: Painting, Printmaking, Set Design, Photography, Sculpture, Film
- Movement: Contemporary art, Postmodernism, Neo-expressionism Pictures Generation
- Spouse: Emily Cole Hunt
- Awards: Guggenheim Fellowship (1986)
- Website: www.davidsallestudio.net

David Salle (born September 28, 1952; last name pronounced "Sally") is an American Postmodern painter, printmaker, photographer, and stage designer. Salle was born in Norman, Oklahoma, and lives and works in East Hampton, New York. He earned a BFA and MFA from the California Institute of the Arts, Valencia, California, where he studied with John Baldessari. Salle’s work first came to public attention in New York City in the early 1980s.

== Biography ==
David Salle was born to Russian Jewish immigrant parents on September 28, 1952, in Norman, Oklahoma, but grew up in Wichita, Kansas. He developed an interest in art at a very young age, spending his childhood and teenage years in art classes provided by a local art organization. At an early age he began taking life-drawing classes at the Wichita Art Association. During high school, he attended outside art classes three days a week.

After graduating from high school, Salle attended the California Institute of the Arts. There he trained and studied under John Baldessari, whom he credits for showing him a path to his artistry. Salle earned his BFA in three years, then received his MFA in two.

After graduating, Salle relocated to New York City, where he worked for Vito Acconci. During this time, he established a working partnership with Mary Boone. Around the same time, Salle was hired by the American Ballet Theatre to design set and costumes for dancer and choreographer Karole Armitage.

In 1995, Salle made his Hollywood directorial debut with Search and Destroy, starring Christopher Walken and Griffin Dunne and produced by Martin Scorsese. The film met with very negative reactions.

== Art ==
Salle's paintings and prints consist of what appear to be randomly juxtaposed and multilayered images, or images placed on top of one other with deliberately illogical techniques, in which he combines original and appropriated imagery. Imagery he uses includes items from popular culture, such as Donald Duck, and pieces from art history, such as parts from a Caravaggio painting.

Salle has worked with different media and processes. Many of his works consist of juxtaposed images, where he takes abstraction and the human figure. He manipulates images by combining a variety of different styles, recognizable imagery, and textures. Exhibitions of his work have taken place at the Whitney Museum of American Art in New York, the Stedelijk Museum in Amsterdam, Museum of Contemporary Art, Los Angeles, Castello di Rivoli (Torino, Italy), the Guggenheim Museum Bilbao, and the Kestnergesellschaft Museum in Hannover, Germany. Salle's work was also featured in The Pictures Generation, an exhibition curated by Douglas Eklund at the Metropolitan Museum of Art in New York. His work was shown among a number of other contemporary artists including Richard Prince, Sherrie Levine, Cindy Sherman, Nancy Dwyer, Robert Longo, Thomas Lawson, Charles Clough, and Michael Zwack.

Salle's process typically starts with photographs he takes for reference, such as hired models. This was both groundbreaking and controversial at the time, primarily because the combination of these two art forms was not common practice. During this period, painters and photographers were often debating which form had more merit, or whether they had merit at all. Though his collection of photographs is considered art itself, Salle has said he would paint his final images because it took images from the real world and placed them in the world and context of painting.

According to Salle, his intention was to eliminate any narrative from his work, though one might attempt to decipher a story from the imagery. His decision-making process begins with one image he is attracted to, to which he continues to add pieces from specific images he acquired until the painting feels complete. Though Salle's works do not contain a narrative, they do not lack meaning or relation. He has said that his choices of image are far from random, and that the pieces he chooses are cross-referenced with one another in complex ways. He believes this to be his form of originality in pieces that he appropriates.

During the COVID-19 pandemic of 2020-21, Salle has painted a series of works called Tree of Life which reference Adam and Eve, the Garden of Eden, and The New Yorker cartoonist Peter Arno (1904-1968). The canvases alternate between a black and white and polychrome palette.

Salle has also done set and costume design and directed films. In 1986 he received a Guggenheim Fellowship for Theater Design, and directed the feature film Search and Destroy. He is a longtime collaborator with the choreographer Karole Armitage, designing sets and costumes for her ballets.

Salle has explored the use of artificial intelligence (AI) in his art. In 2023, he collaborated with computer scientists to create a program capable of generating images reflective of his style. The program was trained on a dataset composed of Salle’s paintings and refined based on his input. Salle has described the generative AI as useful because he can conceptualize variations of artwork when brainstorming ideas for new paintings. When asked about the potential of AI superseding him someday, Salle acknowledged the large role that AI may play in the future of art.

== Written works ==
Salle is also a prolific writer on art. His essays and reviews have appeared in Artforum, Art in America, Modern Painters, The Paris Review, Interview, and numerous exhibition catalogs and anthologies. He was a regular contributor to Town & Country magazine. His collection of critical essays, How to See, was published by W. W. Norton in 2016. Salle worked closely with fellow contemporary artists such as Jeff Koons, Roy Lichtenstein, and John Baldessari in creating this collection. According to Dwight Garner:

Mr. Salle’s mission in How to See is to seize art back from the sort of critics who treat each painting “as a position paper, with the artist cast as a kind of philosopher manqué.” Mr. Salle is more interested in talking about nuts and bolts, about what makes contemporary paintings tick.

Salle's writing is much like his artistic style, witty and intriguing. He believes the jargon associated with art history can and should be simplified so that those who are interested but lack fine art schooling can still learn about and appreciate art.

== Criticism and praise ==
Though Salle insists that his works are not a random assortment of images layered onto one another, critics were difficult to convince. Some common critiques are that his paintings are incoherent and the images he chooses arbitrary and unrelated to one another. The art critic and philosopher Arthur Danto wrote that Salle's paintings convey a "sense of purposiveness with no specific purpose." Critic Robert Storr was fascinated by the work's "graphic double-exposure" and "kaleidoscopic effect," as well as its infinite meanings and interpretations.

Another point of contention was Salle's use of pornographic images of women, which some critics found a form of voyeurism or downright provocation, particularly to the feminist movement. Mira Schor, a feminist artist and writer, wrote that his portrayals of women seem "to be a continuation of a male conversation which is centuries old, to which women are irrelevant except as depersonalized projections of man's fears and fantasies." Salle, as well as many critics, says that the images, though sexually explicit, are not "particularly erotic" because they are faded and blurred, distancing them from reality.

== Public collections ==
Salle's work is in the permanent collections of numerous art museums, including the Museum of Modern Art, New York; Metropolitan Museum of Art, New York; Museum of Contemporary Art, Los Angeles; Los Angeles County Museum of Art (LACMA); Museum of Contemporary Art, Chicago; Walker Art Center, Minneapolis; Whitney Museum of American Art, New York; Tate Modern, London; and the National Gallery of Australia, Canberra.
