= John Baldessari =

American conceptual artist (1931–2020)

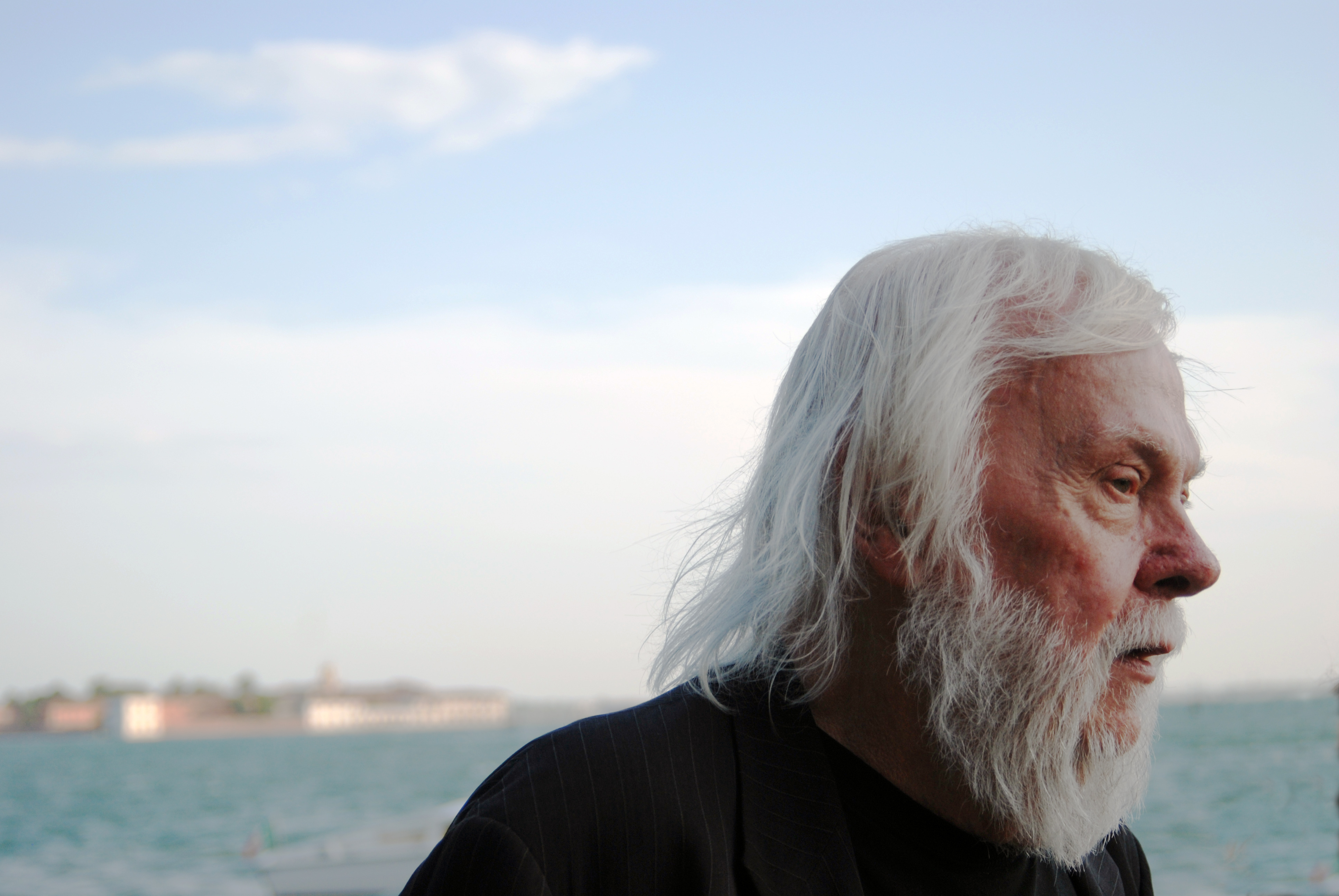
- Baldessari in 2009
- Born: John Anthony Baldessari; June 17, 1931; National City, California, U.S.
- Died: January 2, 2020 (aged 88); Venice, California, U.S.
- Known for: Painting, conceptual art
- Notable work: Everything is Purged... (1966–68), Tips for Artists Who Want to Sell (1966–68), Bloody Sundae (1987), Frames and Ribbons (1988), Noses & Ears, Etc.: Blood, Fist, And Head (With Nose And Ear) (2006)
- Style: Contemporary Art
- Spouse: Carol Ann Wixom (1960–1984)
- Awards: 2014 National Medal of Arts Award, Golden Lion for Lifetime Achievement, awarded by La Biennale di Venezia, Goslarer Kaiserring, Guggenheim Fellowship

John Anthony Baldessari (June 17, 1931 – January 2, 2020) was an American conceptual artist known for his work featuring found photography and appropriated images. He lived and worked in Santa Monica and Venice, California.

Initially a painter, Baldessari began to incorporate texts and photography into his canvases in the mid-1960s. In 1970, he began working in printmaking, film, video, installation, sculpture and photography. He created thousands of works which demonstrate—and, in many cases, combine—the narrative potential of images and the associative power of language within the boundaries of the work of art. His art has been featured in more than 200 solo exhibitions in the United States and Europe. His work influenced that of Cindy Sherman, David Salle, Annette Lemieux, and Barbara Kruger among others.

== Early life and education ==
Baldessari was born in National City, California, to Hedvig Marie Jensen (1896–1950), a Danish nurse, and Antonio Baldessari (1877–1976), an Italian salvage dealer. Baldessari and his elder sister were raised in Southern California. Baldessari grew up in relative isolation during the Great Depression.

He attended Sweetwater High School; earned a BA from San Diego State College (1949–53); studied at University of California, Berkeley (1954–55); University of California, Los Angeles (1955); earned an M.A. from San Diego State College, California (1955–57); and studied at Otis Art Institute, Los Angeles (1957–59), and Chouinard Art Institute, Los Angeles.

== Career ==
In 1959, Baldessari began teaching art in the San Diego school system. He taught for nearly three decades, in schools and junior colleges and community colleges, and eventually at the university level. When the University of California decided to open up a campus in San Diego, the new head of the Visual Art Department, Paul Brach, asked Baldessari to be part of the originating faculty in 1968. At UCSD he shared an office with David Antin. In 1970, Baldessari moved to Santa Monica, where he met many artists and writers, and began teaching at CalArts. His first classes included David Salle, Jack Goldstein, Mike Kelley, Ken Feingold, Tony Oursler, James Welling, Barbara Bloom, Matt Mullican, and Troy Brauntuch. While at CalArts, Baldessari taught "the infamous Post Studio class", which he intended to "indicate people not daubing away at canvases or chipping away at stone, that there might be some other kind of class situation." The class, which operated outside of medium-specificity, was influential in informing the context for addressing a student's art practice at CalArts, and established a tradition of conceptual critique at CalArts that was carried on by artists such as Michael Asher. He quit teaching at CalArts in 1986, moving on to teach at UCLA, which he continued until 2008. At UCLA, his students included Elliott Hundley and Analia Saban.

== Work and themes ==
=== Early text paintings ===
By 1966, Baldessari was using photographs and text, or simply text, on canvas. His early major works were canvas paintings that were empty but for painted statements derived from contemporary art theory. An early attempt of Baldessari's included the hand-painted phrase "Suppose it is true after all? WHAT THEN?" (1967) on a heavily worked painted surface. However, this proved personally disappointing because the form and method conflicted with the objective use of language that he preferred to employ. Baldessari decided the solution was to remove his own hand from the construction of the image and to employ a commercial, lifeless style so that the text would impact the viewer without distractions. The words were then physically lettered by sign painters, in an unornamented black font. The first of this series presented the ironic statement "A TWO-DIMENSIONAL SURFACE WITHOUT ANY ARTICULATION IS A DEAD EXPERIENCE" (1967).

Another work, Painting for Kubler (1967–68) presented the viewer theoretical instructions on how to view it and on the importance of context and continuity with previous works. This work referenced art historian George Kubler's seminal book, The Shape of Time: Remarks on the History of Things. The seemingly legitimate art concerns were intended by Baldessari to become hollow and ridiculous when presented in such a purely self-referential manner.

=== Disowning of early work ===
In 1970, Baldessari and five friends burnt all of the paintings he had created between 1953 and 1966 as part of a new piece, titled The Cremation Project. The ashes from these paintings were baked into cookies and placed into an urn, and the resulting art installation consists of a bronze commemorative plaque with the destroyed paintings' birth and death dates, as well as the recipe for making the cookies. Through the ritual of cremation Baldessari draws a connection between artistic practice and the human life cycle. Thus the act of disavowal becomes generative as with the work of auto-destructive artist Jean Tinguely.

=== Juxtaposing text with images ===
Baldessari is best known for works that blend photographic materials (such as film stills), take them out of their original context and rearrange their form, often including the addition of words or sentences. Related to his early text paintings were his Wrong series (1966–1968), which paired photographic images with lines of text from an amateur photography book, aiming at the violation of a set of basic "rules" on snapshot composition. In one of the works, Baldessari had himself photographed in front of a palm precisely so that it would appear that the tree were growing out of his head. His photographic California Map Project (1969) created physical forms that resembled the letters in "California" geographically near to the very spots on the map that they were printed. In the Binary Code Series, Baldessari used images as information holders by alternating photographs to stand in for the on-off state of binary code; one example alternated photos of a woman holding a cigarette parallel to her mouth and then dropping it away.

Another of Baldessari's series juxtaposed an image of an object such as a glass, or a block of wood, and the phrase "A glass is a glass" or "Wood is wood" combined with "but a cigar is a good smoke" and the image of the artist smoking a cigar. These directly refer to René Magritte's The Treachery of Images; the images similarly were used to stand in for the objects described. However, the series also apparently refers to Sigmund Freud's famous attributed observation that "Sometimes a cigar is just a cigar", as well as to Rudyard Kipling's "… a woman is only a woman, but a good cigar is a smoke."

In "Double Bill", a 2012 series of large inkjet prints, Baldessari paired the work of two selected artists (such as Giovanni di Paolo with David Hockney, or Fernand Léger with Max Ernst) on a single canvas, further altering the appropriated picture plane by overlaying his own hand-painted color additions. Baldessari then names only one of his two artistic "collaborators" on each canvas's lower edge, such as …AND MANET or …AND DUCHAMP.

=== Arbitrary games ===
Baldessari has expressed that his interest in language comes from its similarities in structure to games, as both operate by an arbitrary and mandatory system of rules. In this spirit, many of his works are sequences showing attempts at accomplishing an arbitrary goal, such as Throwing Three Balls in the Air to Get a Straight Line (1973), in which the artist attempted to do just that, photographing the results, and eventually selecting the "best out of 36 tries", with 36 being the determining number just because that is the standard number of shots on a roll of 35mm film. The writer eldritch Priest ties John Baldessari's piece Throwing four balls in the air to get a square (best of 36 tries) as an early example of post-conceptual art. This work was published in 1973 by a young Italian publisher: Giampaolo Prearo that was one of the first to believe and invest in the work of Baldessari. He printed two series one in 2000 copies and a second more precious reserved to the publisher in 500 copies. Following Baldessari's seminal statement "I will not make any more boring Art", he conceived the work The Artist Hitting Various Objects with a Golf Club (1972–73), composed of 30 photographs of the artist swinging and hitting with a golf club objects excavated from a dump, as a parody of cataloging rather than a thorough straight classification.

=== Pointing ===
Much of Baldessari's work involves pointing, in which he tells the viewer not only what to look at but how to make selections and comparisons, often simply for the sake of doing so. Baldessari's Commissioned Paintings (1969) series took the idea of pointing literally, after he read a criticism of conceptual art that claimed it was nothing more than pointing. Beginning with photos of a hand pointing at various objects, Baldessari then hired amateur yet technically adept artists to paint the pictures. He then added a caption "A painting by [painter's name]" to each finished painting. In this instance, he has been likened to a choreographer, directing the action while having no direct hand in it, and these paintings are typically read as questioning the idea of artistic authorship. The amateur artists have been analogized to sign painters in this series, chosen for their pedestrian methods that were indifferent to what was being painted. Baldessari critiques formalist assessments of art in a segment from his video How We Do Art Now (1973), entitled "Examining Three 8d Nails", in which he gives obsessive attention to minute details of the nails, such as how much rust they have, or descriptive qualities such as which appears "cooler, more distant, less important" than the others.

=== Dots ===
Circular adhesive dots covering up the faces of photographed and painted portraits are a prevailing motif in Baldessari's work from the mid-1980s onward. The artist himself suspected that, despite the broad array of approaches he's taken over the course of his career, he will be best remembered as "the guy who puts dots over peoples faces." Examples of the "dot portraits" would include—for example—Bloody Sunday (1987) or Stonehenge with Two Persons (2005), though these works are numerous and it is difficult to identify an exemplar. The dots in these paintings evoke brightly colored price-stickers sometimes seen at garage sales, thrift stores or placed on retail items during a sale. Indeed, these stickers appear to have been the inspiration for the method. Describing his initial intuitive leap in this direction, Baldessari said, "I just had these price stickers I was using for something else, in some graphic way and I put them on all the faces and I just felt like it leveled the playing field." The dot-faced works may sometimes be described as paintings, collages, or may be released as print editions.

=== Prints ===
The Fallen Easel (1988) at the Art Institute of Chicago, in 2023

Studio (1988) at the Los Angeles County Museum of Art

Baldessari began making prints in the early 1970s and continued to produce editions. He created his first print – I Will Not Make Any More Boring Art (1971) - as an edition to raise funds for the Nova Scotia College of Art and Design, Halifax. The lithograph was created in conjunction with the now renowned exhibition for which – at Baldessari's request – students endlessly wrote the phrase "I will not make any more boring art" on the gallery walls. The artist has since worked internationally with premier publishers including Arion Press of San Francisco, Brook Alexander Editions of New York, Cirrus Editions of Los Angeles, Crown Point Press of San Francisco, Edition Jacob Samuel of Santa Monica, Gemini G.E.L. of Los Angeles, Mixografia of Los Angeles, Multiples, Multi Editions of Los Angeles, Inc. of New York, and Peter Blum Editions of New York. His 1988 prints, The Fallen Easel and Object (with Flaw), represented a major shift in Baldessari's approach to presentation, allowing a more complex relationship between his found imagery. In both prints, Baldessari expertly contrasts unrelated photographs to suggest a mysterious and/or ominous undercurrent. In the 1990s Baldessari began working with Mixografia Workshop to create three-dimensional prints utilizing their unique process of printing from metal molds. Baldessari's interest in dimensionality has carried over to recent editions from Gemini G.E.L., including the Person with Guitar series (2005) and the print series Noses & Ears, Etc. (2006–2007) in which screen-printed images are constructed in three layers on sintra with hand painting. A 2007 publication from Gemini is God Nose, a cast aluminum piece that is designed to hang from the ceiling. Baldessari also contributed to the 2008 Artists for Obama portfolio, a set of prints in a limited edition of 150 published by Gemini G.E.L.

=== Performance and film ===
Originally conceived in 1970, Unrealised Proposal for Cadavre Piece would have visitors look through a peep-hole and see a dead male body laid out with its feet towards them inside a climate-controlled vitrine, made to resemble Andrea Mantegna’s painting, The Lamentation over the Dead Christ (1480). Hans Ulrich Obrist, the co-director of London’s Serpentine Gallery and Klaus Biesenbach, the director of MoMA PS1, first attempted to realize Baldessari’s idea in 2011 and the resulting paperwork of failed attempts to procure a willing male cadaver was displayed in the exhibition "11 Rooms" at the Manchester International Festival.

Baldessari's film Police Drawing documents a 1971 performance, Police Drawing Project. In this piece, the artist walked into a class of art students who had never seen him, set up a video camera to document the proceedings, and left the room. Subsequently, a police artist entered and, based on the students' testimony, sketched a likeness of the artist. In the black-and-white video I Am Making Art (1971), Baldessari stands facing the camera; for nearly 20 minutes, he strikes and then holds various poses — crossing his arms over his chest or swinging one arm out to one side or pointing directly at the lens, for example — and with each new gesture, he states "I am making art." In a 1972 tribute to fellow artist Sol LeWitt, Baldessari sang lines from LeWitt's thirty-five statements on conceptual art to the tune of popular songs. Other films include Teaching a Plant the Alphabet and the Inventory videos, also from 1972.

A riff on his 1977 color video Six Colourful Inside Jobs, in Thirteen Colorful Inside Jobs (2013) a room is repainted by a performer in a different colour every day for the duration of the exhibition, carefully following the instructions of the artist.

=== Sculpture ===
Baldessari created his first ever sculpture, Beethoven's Trumpet (with Ear) Opus # 127, 130, 131, 132, 133, 135 (2007), a series of 6 resin, fiberglass, bronze, aluminum, and electronics components in the form of a gigantic bronze trumpet extending off an oversized ear sculpted on the wall. The sculpture was produced with Beyer Projects. When the viewer speaks into the trumpet, the sounds causes a short recital of a phrase from a Beethoven string quartet. Baldessari has gone on to create sculptural works that often incorporate resin, bronze, and steel, such as the approximately 2.4 m carrot (Fake Carrot, 2016) and an elongated bronze figure trapped wearing a wooden barrel in a nod to Giacometti (Giacometti Variation, 2018).

== Exhibitions ==
Baldessari was in over 200 solo shows and 1,000 group shows in his six-decade career. He had his first gallery solo exhibition at the Molly Barnes Gallery in Los Angeles in 1968. His first retrospective exhibition in the U.S. in 1981 was mounted by the New Museum of Contemporary Art in New York, and traveled to the Contemporary Arts Center, Cincinnati, the CAM, Houston, the Van Abbemuseum, Eindhoven, and the Museum Folkwang, Essen.

His work has since been exhibited in:

- Documenta V (1972) and VII (1982)
- the Whitney Biennial (1983)
- the Carnegie International (1985–86)
- the 47th Venice Biennial (1997)

Solo presentations of his work at museums have included exhibitions at:

- Cornerhouse, Manchester (1995)
- the Albertina, Vienna (1999)
- Sprengel Museum, Hannover (1999–2000)
- Museo d'Arte Moderna Contemporanea di Trento e Rovereto, Trento (2000–2001)
- Museum Moderner Kunst Stiftung Ludwig Wien, the Kunsthaus Graz, and Deutsche Guggenheim Berlin (2004)
- Museo Jumex, Mexico City (2017)

Retrospectives of his work were shown at MOCA, Los Angeles, which traveled to SFMOMA, the Hirshhorn Museum and Sculpture Garden, the Whitney Museum and the Musée d'Art Contemporain, Montreal in 1990–92; at Cornerhouse, Manchester, and traveled to London, Stuttgart, Ljubljana, Oslo, and Lisbon in 1995-96 entitled "This Not That"; and Pure Beauty opened at the Tate Modern, London, in 2009 and travelled to MACBA, Barcelona; LACMA, Los Angeles; and The Metropolitan Museum of Art, New York, through 2011.

There was an "Artist's Choice: John Baldessari" at the Museum of Modern Art in 1994, and the artist was invited to curate the exhibition "Ways of Seeing: John Baldessari Explores the Collection" at the Hirshhorn Museum and Sculpture Garden in 2006, and he created the exhibition design for "Magritte and Contemporary Art: The Treachery of Images" at the Los Angeles County Museum of Art.

For the 2017/2018 season at the Vienna State Opera he designed the large-scale image (176 m^{2} (1,890 sq ft)) "Graduation" for the ongoing series "Safety Curtain", conceived by museum in progress.

== Publications ==
- Choosing: Green Beans. Milan: Edizioni Toselli
- Ingres and Other Parables. Texts in English, French, German, and Italian. London: Studio International Publications
- Throwing Three Balls in the Air to Get a Straight Line (Best of Thirty-Six Attempts). Milan: Giampaolo Prearo Editore S.r.L.; and Galleria Toselli
- Four Events and Reactions. Florence: Centro Di; and Paris: Galerie Sonnabend.
- Throwing a Ball Once to Get Three Melodies and Fifteen Chords, John Baldessari: 1973. Berkeley, California: Regents of the University of California; and Irvine, California: Art Gallery, University of California, Irvine
- Brutus Killed Caesar. Akron, Ohio: Emily H. Davis Art Gallery, University of Akron; in cooperation with Sonnabend Gallery, New York, and Ohio State University, Columbus, Ohio.
- Fable - A Sentence of Thirteen Parts (With Twelve Alternate Verbs) Ending in FABLE. Hamburg, West Germany: Anatol AV und Filmproduktion
- Close-Cropped Tales. CEPA Gallery and Albright—Knox Art Gallery, Buffalo, NY, 1981.
- The Life and Opinions of Tristram Shandy. Images by John Baldessari, text by Laurence Sterne, Arion Press, San Francisco, CA.
- The Telephone Book (With Pearls). Gent, Belgium: Imschoot, Uitgevers for IC.
- Lamb. Images by John Baldessari, story by Meg Cranston. Valencia, Spain: IVAM Centre Julio Gonzlez
- Zorro (Two Gestures and one Mark). Oktagon Verlag, Cologne, Germany.
- The Metaphor Problem Again. Collaboration with Lawrence Weiner. Ink-Tree Kunsnacht and Mai 35 Galerie Zurich, Switzerland.
- Brown and Green and Other Parables. Reykjavik, Iceland: i8 and Reykjavik Art Museum, Iceland, 2001.
- Yours in Food, John Baldessari: With Meditations on Eating by Paul Auster, John Baldessari, David Byrne, Dave Eggers, David Gilbert, Tim Griffin, Andy Grundberg, John Haskell, Michael More, Glenn O’Brien, Francine Prose, Peter Schjeldahl, Lynne Tillman. New York: Princeton Architectural Press, 2004.
- The Metaphor Problem Again: A Conversation Moderated by Beatrix Ruf. Heidelberg, Germany: Springer-Verlag, 2006. Transcription of a conversation with John Baldessari, Liam Gillick, Lawrence Weiner, Beatrix Ruf, and Cristina Bechtler.
- Prima Facie: Marilyn's Dress, A Poem (In Four Parts). Cologne: Verlag Der Buchhandlung Walther König, 2006.
- Again the Metaphor Problem and Other Engaged Critical Discourses about Art: A Conversation Between John Baldessari, Liam Gillick and Lawrence Weiner, Moderated by Beatrix Ruf. Vienna and New York: SpringerWienNewYork, 2007.
- John Baldessari: Alejandro Cesarco: Retrospective. Cologne:Verlag der Buchhandlung Walther König, 2007. Collaborative work with Alejandro Cesarco.
- John Baldessari: Koen van den Broek: This an Example of That. Gemeenteplein (Belgium): bkSM (beeldende kunst Strombeek/Mechelen), 2008. Collaborative work with Koen van den Broek.
- Parse. Zurich: JRP|Ringier, 2010. Artist's book version of the Ringier Annual Report 2009 project.
- John Baldessari: A Catalogue Raisonne of Prints and Multiples, 1971–2007, by Sharon Coplan Hurowitz, published by Hudson Hills Press, 2009.

== Collections ==
Baldessari's work is held in the following permanent collections:

- Art Institute of Chicago: 5 works (as of 18 August 2021)
- Museum of Modern Art: 113 works (as of 18 August 2021)
- Guggenheim Museum: 2 works (as of 18 August 2021)
- Los Angeles County Museum of Art: 267 works (as of 18 August 2021)
- Hirshhorn Museum and Sculpture Garden
- Broad Collection

== Recognition ==
Baldessari has been the recipient of numerous awards, among others:

- 1986 Guggenheim Fellowship
- 1996 Oscar Kokoschka Prize, Austria
- 1997 Governor's Award for Lifetime Achievement in the Visual Arts, California.
- 1999 Spectrum-International Award for Photography of the Foundation of Lower Saxony, Germany

College Art Associations Lifetime Achievement Award

- 2002 "Best Web-Based Original Art," AICA USA Best Show Awards, 2001/2002 Season.

Los Angeles Institute for the Humanities Fellow, sponsored by the University of Southern California

- 2003 "2nd Place Best Show Commercial Gallery National by US Art Critics Association for exhibit at Margo Leavin, 2003
- 2004 Fellow of the American Academy of Arts and Sciences
- 2005 Lifetime Achievement Award, Americans for the Arts, New York, October 11, 2005
- Rolex Mentor and Protégé Arts Initiative, Honoring, New York, November 7, 2005.
- 2006 Certificate of Recognition, the Los Angeles Convention and Visitors Bureau, Los Angeles, CA.
- 2009 Golden Lion Lifetime Achievement, 53rd International Art Exhibition Venice Biennale, Venice, Italy
- 2011 Honoree, LACMA Art + Film Gala, Los Angeles, November 5, 2011.
- 2012 Goslarer Kaiserring (City of Goslar's Kaiser Ring), Germany
- 2015 Honoree, Museum of Contemporary Art, Los Angeles, May 31, 2015.

In 2013, the California Institute of the Arts opened its John Baldessari Art Studio Building, which features approximately 7,000 square feet of space—much of it used as studio space for art students and faculty.

== Art market ==
Baldessari set a personal auction record when his acrylic-on-canvas piece Quality Material (1966–1968) was sold for $4.4 million at Christie's New York in 2007.

In 1972, Ileana Sonnabend agreed to represent him worldwide. In 1999, after twenty-six years with the Sonnabend Gallery, Baldessari went to Marian Goodman. He was also represented by Margo Leavin (1984–2013), Sprüth Magers (from 1998), Mai 36 Galerie and Galerie Greta Meert. Since 2021, the artist's estate has been working with Sprüth Magers worldwide.

== Personal life ==
Between 1960 and 1984, Baldessari was married to Montessorian teacher Carol Ann Wixom; they had two children.

In 1990, Baldessari purchased a bungalow in the coastal Ocean Park neighborhood of Santa Monica and enlisted architects Ron Godfredsen and Danna Sigal for a redesign. He also owned a Frank Gehry-designed vacation home in Venice, California. He operated a studio on Main Street in Santa Monica alongside Richard Diebenkorn and James Turrell.

== Bibliography ==
- Isenberg, Barbara. State of the Arts: California Artists Talk About Their Work. 2005
- Interview with Fabian Stech in ANNUAL MAGAZINE No. 5, 2012, pp. 143–146.
