= Sherrie Levine =

American photographer and conceptual artist (born 1947)

- Born: 17 April 1947 (age 79); Hazleton, Pennsylvania, US
- Education: University of Wisconsin in Madison
- Known for: Rephotography, Painting, Sculpture, Conceptual art, Appropriation art

Sherrie Levine (born 1947) is an American photographer, painter, and conceptual artist. Some of her work consists of exact photographic reproductions of the work of other photographers such as Walker Evans, Eliot Porter and Edward Weston.

== Early life and education ==
Sherrie Levine was born in Hazleton, Pennsylvania in 1947. The Midwest, however, shaped her identity, as she spent most of her childhood and adolescence in the suburbs of St. Louis, Missouri. Levine recalled her mother—who enjoyed painting—sparking her interest in art at eight years old, as she would take Levine to the St. Louis Art Museum. Levine's mother would also take her to see art house films on a regular basis, which later influenced her work. After graduating high school in 1965, she spent eight years in Wisconsin, receiving her B.A. from the University of Wisconsin in Madison in 1969. In 1973, she earned her M.F.A. from the same institution. After working odd jobs in commercial art and teaching, Levine then moved to New York City in 1975 to pursue her art career.

== Work ==
=== Artworks ===
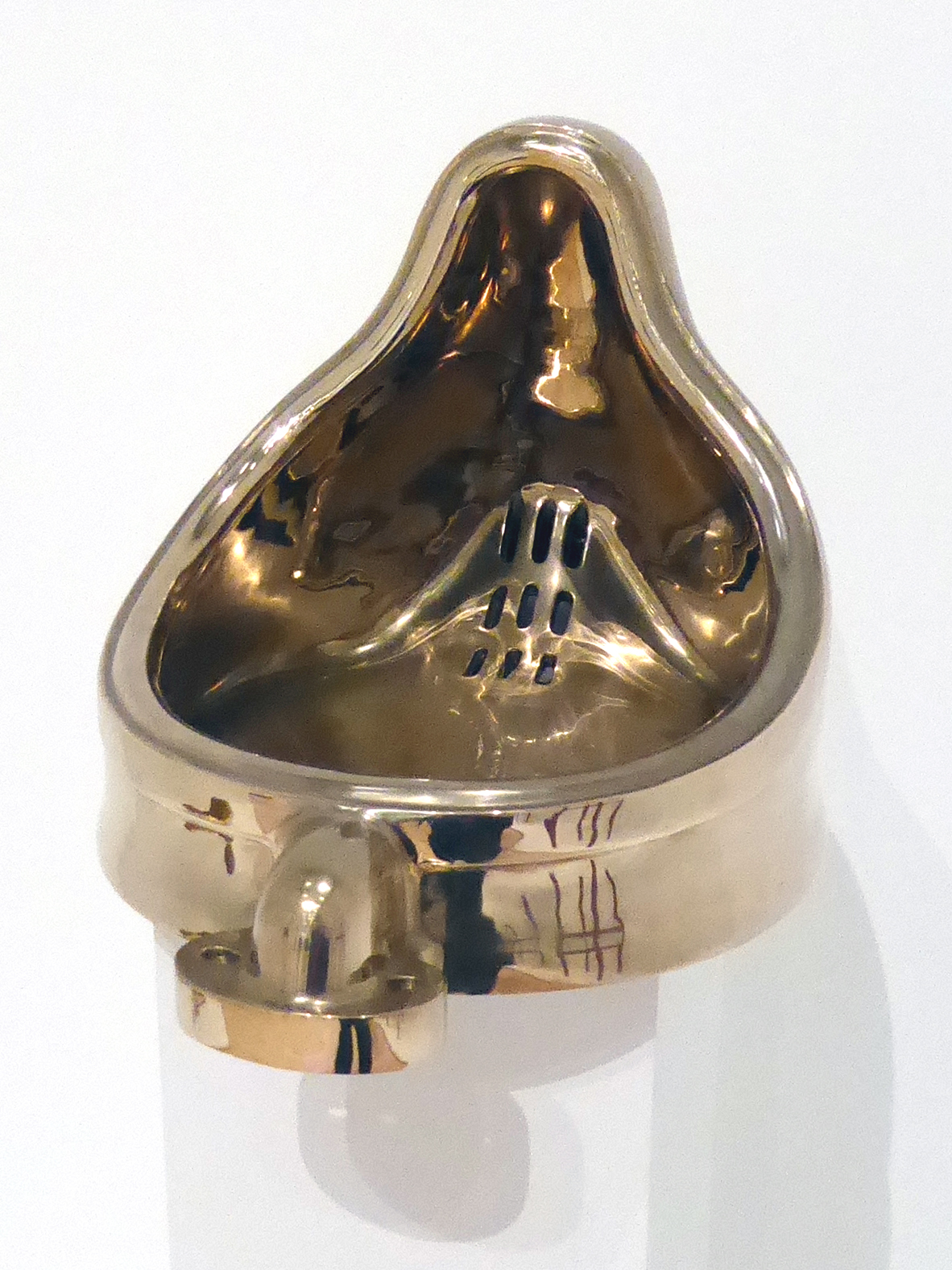
This is an homage to Duchamp’s renowned readymade. Adding to Duchamp’s audacious move, Levine turns his gesture back into an “art object” by elevating its materiality and finish. As a feminist artist, Levine states that she remakes works specifically by male artists who she claims commandeered patriarchal dominance in art history.

Much of Levine's work is explicitly appropriated from recognizable modernist artworks by artists such as Walker Evans, Edgar Degas, Marcel Duchamp, and Constantin Brâncuși. Appropriation art gained notoriety in the late 1970s, although it can be traced to early modernist works, specifically those using collage. Other appropriation artists such as Louise Lawler, Vikky Alexander, Barbara Kruger, and Mike Bidlo came into prominence in New York’s East Village in the 1980s. The importance of appropriation art in contemporary culture lies in its ability to fuse broad cultural images as a whole and direct them towards narrower contexts of interpretation. When coming under criticism with her appropriated works, most notably, Walker Evans' depression-era images, the role of appropriation within Levine's work also helped her to link the 'rarefied art object' and 'mass-produced' works to the extent that she perceived her appropriated works to be 'no less products of mass culture than the images of Elvis or Liz Taylor appropriated and reproduced by Andy Warhol.'

In 1977, Levine participated in the exhibition Pictures at Artists Space in New York, curated by Douglas Crimp. Other artists in the exhibition included Robert Longo, Troy Brauntuch, Jack Goldstein, and Philip Smith. Crimp's term, "Pictures Generation," was later used to describe the generation of artists in the late 1970s and early 1980s who were moving away from minimalism and towards picture-making.

After Walker Evans: 4 (1981) at the National Gallery of Art in 2022

Levine is best known for her series of photographs, After Walker Evans, which was shown at her 1981 solo exhibition at Metro Pictures Gallery in New York. The works consist of well-known Walker Evans photographs, rephotographed by Levine from an Evans exhibition catalogue and then presented as Levine's own artwork without manipulation of the images. The Evans photographs — made famous by his book project Let Us Now Praise Famous Men, with writings by James Agee — are widely considered to be the quintessential photographic record of rural American poor during the Great Depression. The Estate of Walker Evans saw the series as a copyright infringement, and acquired Levine's works to prohibit their sale. Levine later donated the whole series to the estate. All of it is now owned by the Metropolitan Museum of Art, New York. Levine's appropriation of Evans's images has since become a hallmark of the postmodern movement. By rephotographing and re-feminizing this series, Levine makes the images more transparent in their message, rather than focusing on authorship. Including herself in this series can be seen as the artist's gesture of solidarity with the subject.

Levine has rephotographed a number of works by other artists, including Eliot Porter and Edward Weston. Additional examples of Levine's works include photographs of Van Gogh paintings from a book of his work; watercolor paintings based directly on work by Fernand Léger; pieces of plywood with their knotholes painted bright solid colors; and her 1991 sculpture Fountain, a bronze urinal modeled after Marcel Duchamp's 1917 work, Fountain. This work in particular brings attention to the idea of originality and Levine's ability to remake artworks as not quite themselves. In the case of Fountain, Levine purposefully chooses a polished bronze finish to evoke works by Brancusi. By doing so, Levine likens the two artists' works, and raises the question of originality and the copy. Levine also appropriated Duchamp's The Bride Stripped Bare By Her Bachelors, Even, through the creation of her 1989 series, The Bachelors (After Marcel Duchamp). The series comprises six frosted-glass sculptures, each of which follows the design of a different malic-mold found in Duchamp's original. The sculptures are displayed in individual glass vitrines, separate from one another so as to upset the structure of power depicted by Duchamp originally, allowing Levine to make a greater social commentary through her series.

In 1993, Levine created cast glass copies of sculptures by Constantin Brâncuși, held in the permanent collection of the Philadelphia Museum of Art, for an exhibition titled Museum Studies. In 2009, the Metropolitan Museum of Art held an exhibition titled The Pictures Generation, which featured Levine's works. In November 2011, the Whitney Museum of American Art in New York mounted a survey exhibition of Levine's career titled Mayhem. Sherrie Levine: Mayhem, mounted at the Whitney Museum of Art from November 2011 through January 2012, was a meticulously organized installation, ranging from Levine's best-known photographs to works including her more recent Crystal Skull series (2010). During the winter of 2016, Levine exhibited new work of monochrome paintings paired with refrigerators. In 2016-2017 she exhibited at Neues Museum Nürnberg: After All.

In 2010, the artist created a series of eighteen monochromes titled "Gray and Blue Monochromes" based on Alfred Stieglitz's Equivalents (a series of abstract photographs of the sky).

=== Feminism ===
Large Check: 3, 5, 6 -10, and 12 (1987) at the Museum of Modern Art in 2022

Levine's art is most often associated with 1980's theoretical feminism. She was showcased in the exhibit Difference: On Representation and Sexuality in 1984 along with artists such as Barbara Kruger, Jeff Wall, and Mary Kelly. This exhibit focused on gender distortions rather than differences, and the construct of sexuality. Three paintings from Levine's series After Ernst Ludwig Kirchner were included in this exhibit. Her appropriations of male artists' famous works combined with her intentional re-feminizing brings attention to the "difference problem" which this exhibit was focused on. Levine has noted her distaste for the voyeuristic quality of media culture, aligning with Laura Mulvey's analysis of the male gaze. Her work contends with the fact that, in her words, "the art world is so much an arena for the celebration of male desire."

== Exhibitions ==
- Sherrie Levine: La Fortune (After Man Ray), San Francisco Museum of Modern Art (1991)
- Sherrie Levine: Newborn, Philadelphia Museum of Art; Portikus, Frankfurt, Germany; Marian Goodman Gallery, New York; The Menil Collection, Houston; Museum of Contemporary Art, Los Angeles (1993-1995)
- Inviter 5/ Sherrie Levine, Casino Luxembourg - Forum d'art contemporain, Luxembourg (1997)
- Taking Pictures: Sherrie Levine after Walker Evans, Harn Museum of Art, University of Florida, Gainesville (1998)
- New Sculpture, 1996-1999, with Joost van Oss, Musée d'art moderne et contemporain (MAMCO), Geneva (two-person exhibition) (1999)
- Abstraction, The Arts Club of Chicago, Chicago (then traveled to Georgia O'Keeffe Museum, Santa Fe (2006)
- Pairs and Posses, Museum Haus Lange, Krefeld (2010)
- Mayhem, Whitney Museum of American Art, New York (2011)
- Sherrie Levine, Portland Art Museum, Oregon (2013)
- After All, Neues Museum, State Museum for Art and Design in Nuremberg, Germany (2016)
- After Russell Lee: 1-60, Museum of Wisconsin Art, West Bend, WI, USA (2025)

== Public collections ==
Levine's works is held in a number of public institutions, including:

- Albright-Knox Art Gallery, Buffalo, New York
- Allen Memorial Art Museum, Oberlin College, Ohio
- Art Institute of Chicago
- Astrup Fearnley Museet, Oslo
- Baltimore Museum of Art, Maryland
- The Broad, Los Angeles
- CCS Bard Hessel Museum of Art, Annandale-on-Hudson, New York
- Centre Georges Pompidou, Paris
- CAPC Musée d'art contemporain de Bordeaux, France
- Colby College Museum of Art, Waterville, Maine
- La Colección Jumex, Mexico City
- Dallas Museum of Art
- Davison Art Center, Wesleyan University, Middletown, Connecticut
- Falckenberg Collection, Deichtorhallen Hamburg
- Fotomuseum Winterthur, Winterthur, Switzerland
- Hirshhorn Museum and Sculpture Garden, Washington
- Institute of Contemporary Art, Boston
- Los Angeles County Museum of Art
- Louisiana Museum of Modern Art, Humlebæk, Denmark
- Musée d’art moderne et contemporain (MAMCO), Geneva
- The Menil Collection, Houston
- The Metropolitan Museum of Art, New York
- Museum of Contemporary Art Chicago
- Museum of Modern Art
- The National Museum of Art, Osaka
- Philadelphia Museum of Art
- Rhode Island School of Design (RISD) Museum, Providence
- Sammlung Goetz, Munich
- San Francisco Museum of Modern Art
- Smith College Museum of Art, Northampton, Massachusetts
- Solomon R. Guggenheim Museum, New York
- Tate Gallery, London
- Tacoma Art Museum, Washington
- Whitney Museum of American Art
- Williams College Museum of Art, Williamstown, Massachusetts
- Walker Art Center

== See also ==
- Appropriation art
- Neo-conceptual art

== Bibliography ==
- Juan Martín Prada, La Apropiación Posmoderna, Fundamentos, Madrid, 2001, ISBN 978-84-245-0881-4 (in Spanish)
