= Jack Goldstein =

Canadian-American painter

- Born: September 27, 1945; Montreal, Quebec, Canada
- Died: March 14, 2003 (aged 57); San Bernardino, California, US
- Education: Chouinard Art Institute, California Institute of the Arts
- Known for: Performance artist, Conceptual artist, Painter
- Movement: Minimalist sculpture The Pictures Generation

Jack Goldstein (September 27, 1945 – March 14, 2003) was a Canadian born, California and New York-based performance and conceptual artist turned post-conceptual painter in the 1980s.

== Early life and education ==
Goldstein was born to a Jewish family in Montreal, Quebec, and moved as a boy to Los Angeles, California, where he attended high school in the 1960s and started taking an interest in learning about art. He received his training at Chouinard Art Institute and was a member of the inaugural class of California Institute of the Arts, where he worked in post-studio art under John Baldessari, receiving an MFA in 1972.

== Work ==
A performance artist with roots in minimalist sculpture and a conceptual artist who made experimental films and their audio equivalent on vinyl records, Goldstein divided his time between Los Angeles and New York City during the 1970s. While still a student at CalArts in 1972, he buried himself alive; with a stethoscope attached to his chest. He breathed air from plastic tubes while a red light above ground flashed to the rhythm of his beating heart.

In the early 1970s as audio art and video recordings became more accessible to the general public, Goldstein seized the opportunity and began producing his own art records. Among his records were A Swim Against the Tide, A Faster Run (a recording of a stampede), The Tornado, Two Wrestling Cats and The Six Minute Drown. The Six Minute Drown in particular gained attention within the art world. In it, the dreary, agonizing sounds of a drowning man reverberate for six minutes.

Goldstein eventually became one of the linchpins of the Pictures Group, which gained its first recognition at Artists Space in New York City in the fall of 1977. During this time, he shared a studio building with James Welling.

The Pictures artists, including Goldstein, Robert Longo and Troy Brauntuch came to the forefront of the early-1980s and flourished to varying degrees as the decade wore on. Goldstein began seriously to make paintings at this time. Eventually he became known for what he referred to as "salon paintings", designed both to be sold and secure for the artist a place in art history. Although he was accused by some of "selling out" to a bull market in painting, this tactic appropriated the art star mantle that Goldstein's work always has assumed.

Goldstein began to concentrate on painting in the late 1970s. His paintings were based on photographic images of natural phenomena, science, and technology – the result of Goldstein's intent to record "the spectacular instant," as previously depicted in photography. Many of them depict streaking fighter jets, lightning storms, exploding nebulae and city skylines illuminated by fireworks or bombing raids. Using found photographs, and highlighting the reproduction or copy, Goldstein blew up details to near abstraction and then hired painters to apply them to canvases on boxlike stretchers that stand more than six inches off the wall. He was among the first contemporary painters to hire others to make his works.

By the mid-’70s, Goldstein had stopped appearing in his films and performances and instead hired actors, stuntmen and light and sound technicians from the film industry. His films include the well-known Metro-Goldwyn Mayer (1975), a two-minute loop of the film studio’s roaring lion mascot on a blood red field, and Shane (1975), named for the trained German Shepherd that barks in response to inaudible commands from someone behind the camera.

Most of Goldstein's work revolved around the concept of experience, the concept of grappling with the conflation of experience and our recording of it. It asks whether documentation has become primary in our experience.

As the 1980s continued there was less and less call for his paintings and Goldstein's work sold less well than some others'. Reluctant to teach rather than practice full-time, Goldstein left New York in the early 1990s and returned to California where he lived out the decade in relative isolation.

He committed suicide by hanging in 2003. Less than a year later, he was featured in the 2004 Whitney Biennial as a major film influence alongside Stan Brakhage. It was the first sign of his early work enjoying renewed acclaim. in San Bernardino, California on March 14, 2003.

Goldstein may be remembered for a certain post-conceptual representational approach to painting that helped shape a generation of artists and beyond, even though they might not even be aware of him.

A posthumous documentary was made on Goldstein in 2014, titled Jack Goldstein: Pictures and Sounds: ART/New York No. 67

He has also been the subject of solo presentations at Venus Over Manhattan: Where is Jack Goldstein? in 2013 and Jack Goldstein in 2017.

== Exhibitions ==
Goldstein compiled an extensive exhibition record during his productive years. Even after he stopped painting and moved back to Southern California, museums continued to exhibit his work. In 2002, a show of his films and performances was presented at the Whitney Museum of American Art in New York, and retrospectives were staged at the Maison de la culture de Grenoble in Grenoble, France, and the Luckman Gallery at California State University, Los Angeles. A large-scale retrospective was originally scheduled for the Museum of Contemporary Art in Los Angeles but was canceled in 2010 by its then-director, Jeffrey Deitch; it was instead shown at the Orange County Museum of Art and the Jewish Museum in New York in 2013. A new exhibit called "Disappearing" at the Modern Art Museum of Fort Worth showcased Goldstein's work (along with two other artists) in the summer of 2019.

== See also ==
- List of contemporary artists
- Contemporary art
- Documenta
- Tellus Audio Cassette Magazine
