= Robert Longo =

New York-based artist, filmmaker, and musician

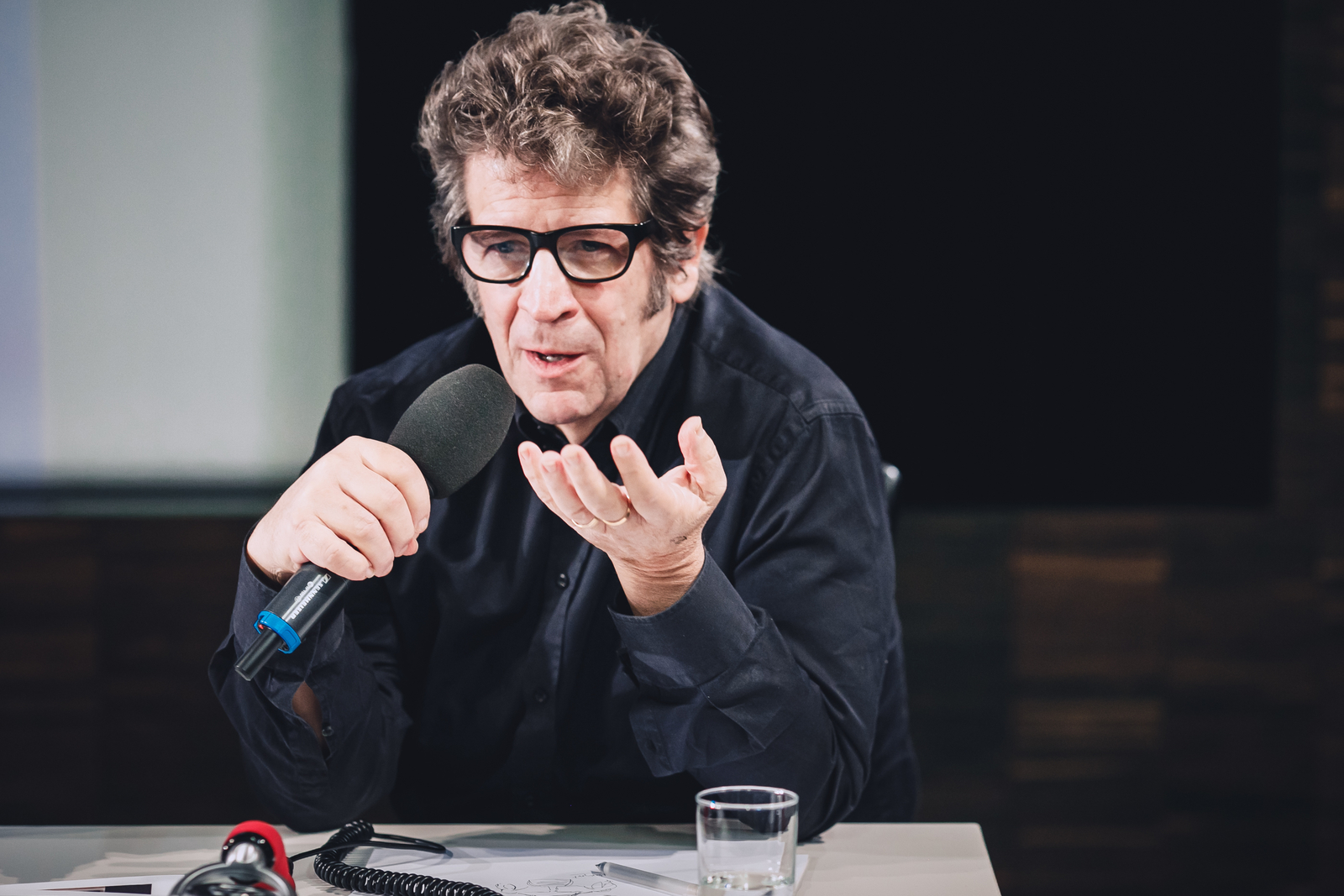
- Longo in 2018
- Born: January 7, 1953 (age 73); Brooklyn, New York City, U.S.
- Education: University of North Texas (dropped out); Buffalo State College (BFA)
- Occupation: Artist
- Spouse: Sophie Chahinian (m. 2022) Barbara Sukowa (m. 1994; sep. 2018)
- Children: 3

Longo interviewed by Hal Foster in 2017

Robert Longo (born January 7, 1953) is an American artist, filmmaker, photographer and musician. Longo became first well known in the 1980s for his Men in the Cities drawing and print series, which depict sharply dressed men and women writhing in contorted emotion. He lives in New York and East Hampton.

== Early life and education ==
Longo was born in 1953 in Brooklyn, New York, and raised in Long Island. During his childhood he had a fascination with mass media; movies, television, magazines, and comic books, which continue to influence his art.

Longo began college at the University of North Texas, in the town of Denton, but left before earning a degree. He later studied sculpture under Leonda Finke, who encouraged him to pursue a career in the visual arts. In 1972, Longo received a grant to study at the Accademia di Belle Arti in Florence, Italy. Upon his return to New York, Longo enrolled at Buffalo State College, where he received a BFA in 1975. While at Buffalo State, he studied under art professor Joseph Piccillo. At this time he was in a romantic relationship with artist Cindy Sherman, who was also studying art at Buffalo State.

While in college, Longo and friends established a contemporary art gallery in their co-op building called the Essex Art Center, which eventually became Hallwalls Contemporary Art Center. Through his gallery efforts, Longo met many local and New York City artists and eventually moved to New York City to participate in the No Wave art scene of the late-1970s and befriended artists and critics involved with the journal Effects: Magazine for New Art Theory.

== Work ==
=== Drawing ===
Although he studied sculpture, drawing remained Longo's favorite form of self-expression. However, the sculptural influence pervades his drawing technique, as Longo's "portraits" have a distinctive chiseled line that seems to give the drawings a three-dimensional quality. Longo uses graphite like clay, molding it to create images like the writhing, dancing figures in his seminal Men in the Cities series. In 1978 Longo commissioned professional illustrator, Diane Shea to draw ‘Percival’ for his 1979 show at The Kitchen. She continued as the sole illustrator of all his drawings; Men In The Cities, Body Hammers, Roses, Combines, and his lithographs, until the early 2000’s when Longo’s work evolved into larger scale drawings. For that series, Longo photographed his friends lurching backward, collapsing forward or sprawled on invisible pavement. After enlarging the pictures through a projector, he and an artist assistant drew them in sizes ranging from three-quarter scale to larger than life-size. In the process, Longo often dramatized poses and always standardized attire into quite formal, black-and-white clothing. The idea for this work came, in 1975, from a still image in Rainer Werner Fassbinder's film The American Soldier. According to art critic William Wilson of the Los Angeles Times, the pictures recall nothing so much as the final scene in Ingmar Bergman's The Seventh Seal. About four years passed before Longo turned the vision of a man shot in the back into a monumental series of drawings. He produced about 60 Men in the Cities between 1979 and 1982. One drawing from this series was used as the album cover to Glenn Branca's album The Ascension. As a consequence, in his 30s, Longo was among the most widely publicized, exhibited and collected artists of the 1980s, along with the likes of Cindy Sherman and David Salle. However, several critics have commented that Longo had lost his way as a visual artist by the mid-'80s.

Working on themes of power and authority, Longo produced a series of blackened American flags (Black Flags 1989–91) as well as oversized hand guns (Bodyhammers 1993–95). From 1995 to 1996 he worked on his Magellan project, 366 drawings (one per day) that formed an archive of the artist's life and surrounding cultural images. Magellan was followed by 2002's Freud Drawings, which reinterpreted Edmund Engelman's famous documentary images of Sigmund Freud's flat, moments before his flight from the Nazis. In 2002 and 2004 he presented Monsters, Bernini-esque renderings of massive breaking waves and The Sickness of Reason, baroque renderings of atomic bomb blasts. "Robert Longo: Monsters showed at Metro Pictures in New York City from September 21-October 26, 2002. Monsters was included in the 2004 Whitney Biennial.

To create works such as Barbara and Ralph, Longo projects photographs of his subjects onto paper and traces the figures in graphite, removing all details of the background. After he records the basic contours, his long-time illustrator, Diane Shea, works on the figure for about a week, filling in the details. Next, Longo goes back into the drawing, using graphite and charcoal to provide "all the cosmetic work". Longo continues to work on the drawing, making numerous adjustments until it is completed about a week later.

In March 2013, The Lexander Magazine reviewed Longo's 1982–83 diptych entitled Pressure, highlighting it as the "penultimate visual anthem of the era," expanding upon Neal Benezra's 1988 analysis of the work as having been "the most representative work of art of the 1980s."

The artist's Engines of State series (made between 2012 and 2019) was given to and exhibited by the National Gallery of Art in 2023 by Clifford Ross.

=== Music videos ===
In the 1980s, Longo directed several music videos, including New Order's "Bizarre Love Triangle", Megadeth's "Peace Sells" and "The One I Love" by R.E.M. He is responsible for the front covers of Glenn Branca's The Ascension from 1981 and The Replacements' 1985 album Tim.

=== Film and television ===
In 1992, Longo directed an episode of Tales from the Crypt entitled "This'll Kill Ya". He also directed the cyberpunk film Johnny Mnemonic, starring Keanu Reeves, Dolph Lundgren and Takeshi Kitano, and a short film named Arena Brains. At the time, Longo was quoted as saying, "making a painting is one thing, but making a film kicks your ass." During the late 1980s and early 1990s Longo developed a number of performance art theatre pieces, such as Marble Fog and Killing Angels, collaborating with Stuart Argabright, the guitarist Chuck Hammer and Douglas Sloan.

=== Music ===
Longo was the leader and guitarist of a musical act called Robert Longo's Menthol Wars, which performed no wave experimental music in New York rock clubs in the late 1970s, such as Tier 3. Members of the band included Richard Prince and David Linton. Menthol Wars also was part of a series of three staple-bound paperback books by Richard Prince published during 1980 by Printed Matter, Inc.

During the same period, Longo also performed with Rhys Chatham in Chatham's Guitar Trio and produced a series of slowly fading slides entitled Pictures for Music which was projected behind the musicians.

=== Photography ===
Commissioned by Italian luxury label Bottega Veneta, Longo photographed models Terron Wood and Alla K for the brand's fall/winter 2010 advertisements, evoking memories of the dancing silhouettes of his Men in the Cities series.

== Exhibitions ==
Longo has had retrospective exhibitions at Hamburger Kunstverein and Deichtorhallen, Menil Collection in Houston, the Los Angeles County Museum of Art in 1989, the Museum of Contemporary Art, Chicago in 1990, Wadsworth Atheneum, The Isetan Museum of Art in Tokyo, a Survey Exhibition 1980–2009 at Musée d'art moderne et d'art contemporain in Nice, France in 2009 and at the Museu Colecção Berardo in Lisbon, Portugal in 2010.

In 2002 Robert Longo exhibited Monsters at Metro Pictures Gallery in New York. In 2025 Longo presented a large survey exhibition at Pace Gallery in New York called The Weight of Hope. The Weight of Hope was a sequel to his Milwaukee Art Museum show The Acceleration of History.

Group exhibitions include Documenta VIII, the Whitney Biennial, and the Venice Biennale. His photorealistic charcoal drawings were featured in the exhibition Proof at the Brooklyn Museum in 2017 alongside works by Francisco Goya and Sergei Eisenstein. exhibited at the Louisiana Museum of Modern Art in Denmark in 2025.

== Influence ==
Longo's work from the Men in the Cities series was prominently displayed in the apartment of fictional character Patrick Bateman in the film American Psycho (2000).

In 2013, Longo's artwork was featured in an article in the men's magazine Man of the World, along with an article discussing his life and career.

== Art market ==
Longo is represented by Pace Gallery (since 2021) and Thaddaeus Ropac.

== Personal life ==
Longo lived with artist Cindy Sherman from 1974 to 1980. He lived with artist Gretchen Bender from 1981 to 1989. Longo married German actress Barbara Sukowa in 1994. Together they have three sons: Hans Longo, Viktor Longo, and Joseph Longo. On May 21, 2022, Longo married Sophie Chahinian, founder of the Artist Profile Archive, in Los Angeles.

Longo moved to Europe in 1990, living for a few years in Paris and working in Spain and Germany. He lives in New York and East Hampton.

When the COVID-19 pandemic forced the Guild Hall of East Hampton to cancel its 2021 summer gala and auction, Longo volunteered to postpone his own summer exhibition at the space and spearhead a $1 million benefit show in its stead.

== Literature ==
- Heinz-Norbert Jocks: Robert Longo. Das Poetische für mich ist eine höhere Form der Gerechtigkeit, Interview from Heinz-Norbert Jocks, in: Kunstforum International, Nr. 273, Cologne 2021, p. 192–211.
