= Helene Winer =

Art gallery owner and curator

Helene Winer (born 1946) is an American art gallery owner and curator. She co-owned Metro Pictures Gallery in New York City with Janelle Reiring. Metro Pictures closed in late 2021. Her career deeply involved the postmodern artists of the 1970s and 1980s known as the Pictures Generation. She lives in Tribeca.

== Early life and education ==
Born in 1946 in Los Angeles, Winer was raised in Westchester and received a B.A. in Art History from the University of Southern California in 1966. She started as an assistant at the Los Angeles County Museum of Art before travelling to Europe, where she took the position of assistant director of the Whitechapel Gallery.

== Pomona College Museum of Art ==
In late 1970, Winer returned to Southern California, where she was appointed as Director of the Museum of Art at Pomona College, and as an assistant professor of art. At Pomona, Winer organized the first solo shows of Jack Goldstein and William Wegman, as well as exhibitions of John Baldessari, Joe Goode, Bas Jan Ader, John McCracken, Ed Moses, Allen Ruppersberg, and Ger van Elk. She also organized sometimes-controversial presentations for performance artists Chris Burden, Hirokazu Kosaka, Wolfgang Stoerchle, and John M. White.

== Artists Space ==
After leaving Pomona, Winer spent a brief period writing for the Los Angeles Times, before moving to New York and freelancing before becoming Director of the non-profit Artists Space in 1975. The 1977 show Pictures, curated by Douglas Crimp, featured the early work of Troy Brauntuch, Jack Goldstein, Sherrie Levine, Robert Longo, and Philip Smith. Pictures turned out to be a seminal exhibition for that group of emerging postmodern artists, who later came to be known as the Pictures Generation, whom Winer's influence helped shape and bring together.

== Metro Pictures ==
Winer left Artists Space and joined with Reiring, formerly of the Castelli Gallery, to open Metro Pictures in 1980. The opening group exhibition featured works from Pictures Generation artists Brauntuch, Goldstein, Levine, Longo, Richard Prince, Cindy Sherman, and James Welling. Subsequent individual exhibitions that followed marked the first major exhibitions for these artists in New York. In the years that followed, new artists have joined the gallery and continued to present new and varied conceptual works, including Olaf Breuning, André Butzer, Andy Hope 1930, Gary Simmons, Andrea Slominski, Isaac Julien, Claire Fontaine, David Malkjovic, Paulina Olowska, Trevor Paglen, Catherine Sullivan, Sara VanDerBeek, Tris Vonna-Michell, B. Wurtz, Camille Henrot, and Nina Beier. The gallery closed in late 2021.
