= Metro Pictures Gallery =

New York City art gallery

Coordinates: 40°44′56.21″N 74°0′17.41″W

Metro Pictures was a New York City art gallery founded in 1980 by Janelle Reiring (previously of Leo Castelli Gallery), and Helene Winer (previously of Artists Space). It was located in SoHo until 1995 when it moved to Chelsea. The gallery closed in December of 2021.

== Artists ==
Metro's opening group exhibition in 1980 included Cindy Sherman, Robert Longo, Troy Brauntuch, Jack Goldstein, Sherrie Levine, Laurie Simmons, James Welling, and Richard Prince.

During the early and mid-1980s, Mike Kelley, Louise Lawler, Martin Kippenberger, John Miller, Tony Oursler, Walter Robinson, and Jim Shaw joined the gallery. Subsequent generations of artists included Gary Simmons, Olaf Breuning, Andy Hope 1930, Andre Butzer, Sara VanDerBeek, Tris Vonna-Michell, Trevor Paglen, Camille Henrot, Sam Falls , Judith Hopf, and Gretchen Bender.

== History ==
In 1996, Metro Pictures teamed up with two other galleries – Gladstone Gallery and Matthew Marks Gallery – to acquire and divide up a 29,000 sq ft (2,700 m^{2}) warehouse at 515 West 24th Street. The space was renovated by 1100 Architect in 2016. It closed in December 2021.
