= Benton Museum of Art =

College art museum in California

Benton Museum of Art at Pomona College
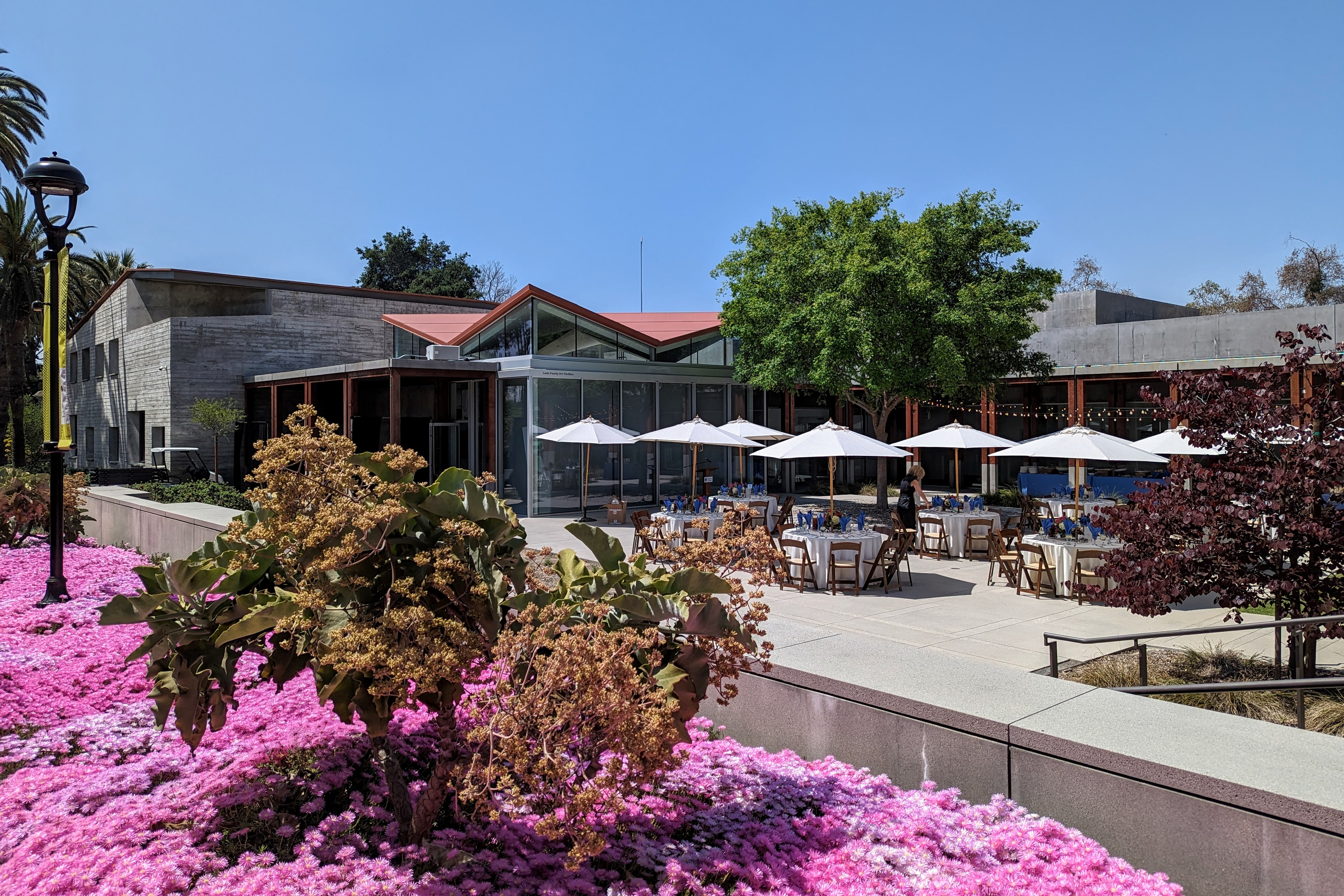
- The museum's courtyard, viewed from College Avenue
- Former names: Gladys K. Montgomery Art Center/Gallery (until 2001); Pomona College Museum of Art (until 2020)
- Established: 1958; 68 years ago
- Location: 211 N. College Ave., Claremont, California, United States
- Coordinates: 34°5′46.2″N 117°42′55.1″W
- Type: Art museum
- Collection size: 19,963 items
- Visitors: 23,710 per year
- Director: Victoria Sancho Lobis
- Architects: Machado Silvetti, Gensler
- Owner: Pomona College
- Public transit access: Claremont
- Website: pomona.edu/museum

The Benton Museum of Art at Pomona College, known colloquially as the Benton, is an art museum at Pomona College in Claremont, California. It was completed in 2020, replacing the Montgomery Art Gallery, which had been home to the Pomona College Museum of Art (PCMA) since 1958. It houses a collection of approximately 20,000 items, including Italian Renaissance panel paintings, indigenous American art and artifacts, and American and European prints, drawings, and photographs. The museum is free to the public.

== History ==
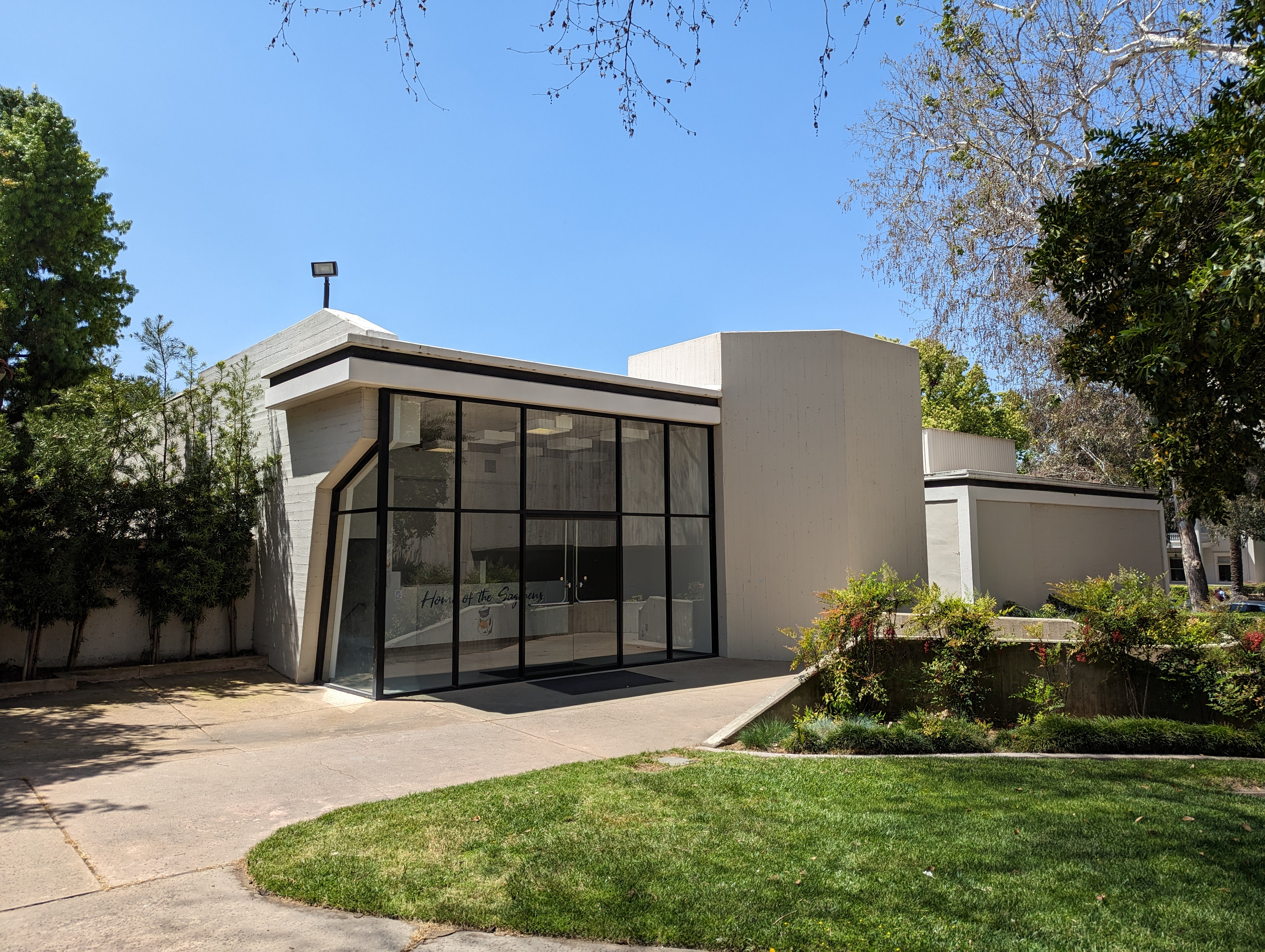
Montgomery Art Gallery building in 2023

Pomona College established a separate School of Art and Design in 1892, and incorporated it into the college c. 1913. In 1958, responding to increased postwar interest in the arts, the Gladys K. Montgomery Art Center was completed adjacent to the art department in Rembrandt Hall, enabling the college to present its permanent collection in one place for the first time. A $280,000 expansion (equivalent to $2.6 million in 2025) completed in 1968 added a second story and nearly doubled its size.

The gallery experienced a brief golden age from 1969 to 1973, during which director Mowry Baden (class of 1958) and curators Hal Glicksman and Helene Winer staged a number of groundbreaking post-minimalist and conceptual exhibitions, including work by James Turrell (class of 1965), Judy Fiskin (class of 1966), Chris Burden (class of 1969), and Peter Shelton (class of 1973), all of whom would later achieve fame. Resistance from the more socially conservative administration, including to a controversial March 1972 performance by Wolfgang Stoerchle in which he urinated on a rug, led to a mass exodus of the art faculty in 1973. Art historian Thomas E. Crow later wrote that the works created and presented at the college during this period were arguably "as salient to art history as any being made and shown anywhere else in the world at that time."

In 1977, a new 2,500-square-foot (230 m^{2}) gallery was added, doubling the available exhibition space. In 2001, the gallery acquired museum status. A more minor renovation was completed in 2006, adding a new entrance.

In 2020, the museum moved to a new building, the Benton, constructed diagonally adjacent to the old Montgomery Gallery. The new facility, named after donor and trustee Janet Inskeep Benton (class of 1979), more than tripled the exhibition and storage space available to the museum. It overcame local opposition from Claremont residents who objected to the moving of a historic house to create space on the lot. It reopened to the public on May 25, 2021, during the COVID-19 pandemic.

== Design ==
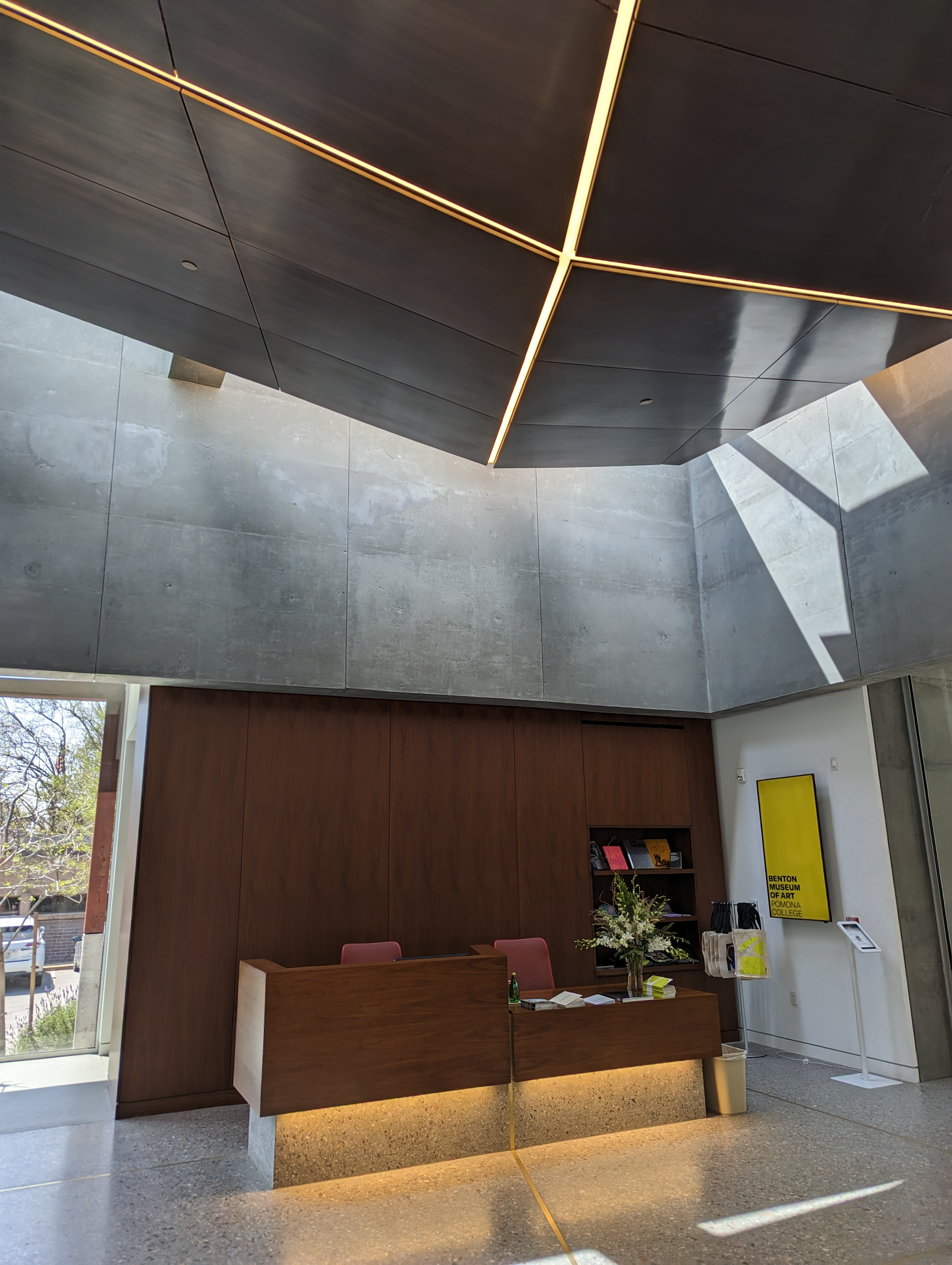
The museum's lobby (view as a 360° interactive panorama)

The museum is located near the southwestern edge of Pomona's campus, adjacent to the Village, Claremont's downtown commercial district. It was designed collaboratively by Boston-based Machado and Silvetti Associates and California-based Gensler, and cost $44 million to build. The building is U-shaped around a courtyard, and is constructed primarily of cast-in-place concrete, with stained heavy timbers as an ornamental accent. It features several visual axes, and is designed to be "visually porous" so that visitors can easily see both into and out of it. It was designed to a LEED Gold standard.

Critical reception of the museum's design was positive. Mick Rhodes of the Claremont Courier described the material palette as "clean and cool without being cold" and noted the spaciousness of the galleries. Brian T. Allen, reviewing for National Review, called the museum "a perfect gem". He wrote that "I've rarely seen a more thoughtful, comprehensive, economically efficient building project". Michael J. Lewis wrote in The Wall Street Journal that "its distinction is obvious; it is arrayed on three sides of an open plaza, its cast-in-place concrete walls suggesting an abstract classicism while the stained timber elements that form its portico and porch give it a stately and equally classical rhythm."

== Collections ==
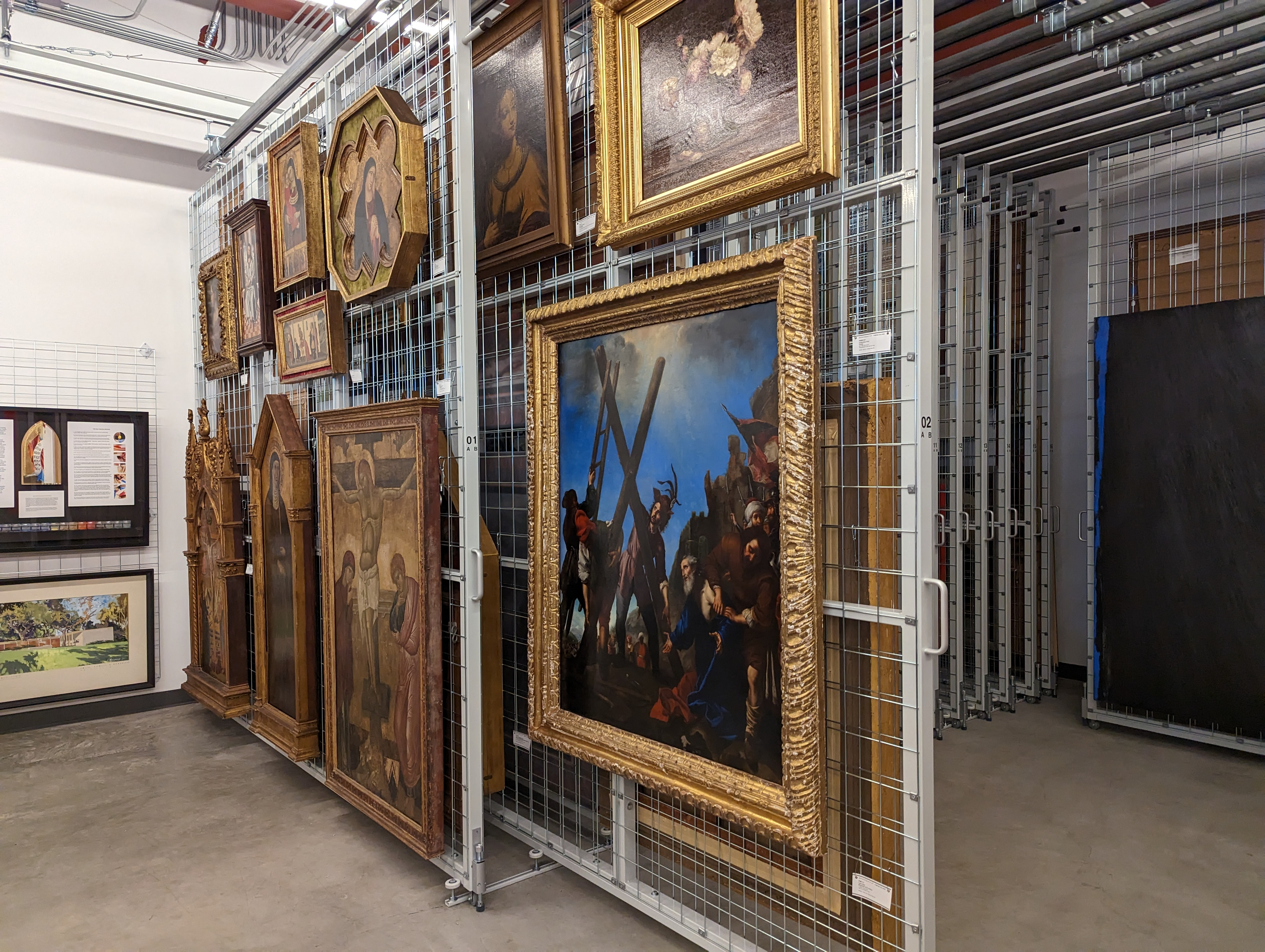
Collections vault at the museum

The Benton houses a collection of approximately 20,000 items, including Italian Renaissance panel paintings, approximately 6,000 Pre-Columbian to 20th-century indigenous American art and artifacts, and American and European prints, drawings, and photographs. Many of the museum's exhibitions focus on Southern Californian artists. Former director Kathleen Howe described its primary focus as "contemporary art with an edge".

The museum oversees several notable public artworks on Pomona's campus, including The Spirit of Spanish Music by Burt William Johnson (1915), Prometheus by José Clemente Orozco (1930), Genesis by Rico Lebrun (1960), and Dividing the Light by James Turrell (2007). A statue by Alison Saar, Imbue, is located in the museum's courtyard; it depicts the Yoruba goddess of childbirth, Yemọja, carrying a large stack of pails on her head.

Public art at Pomona College

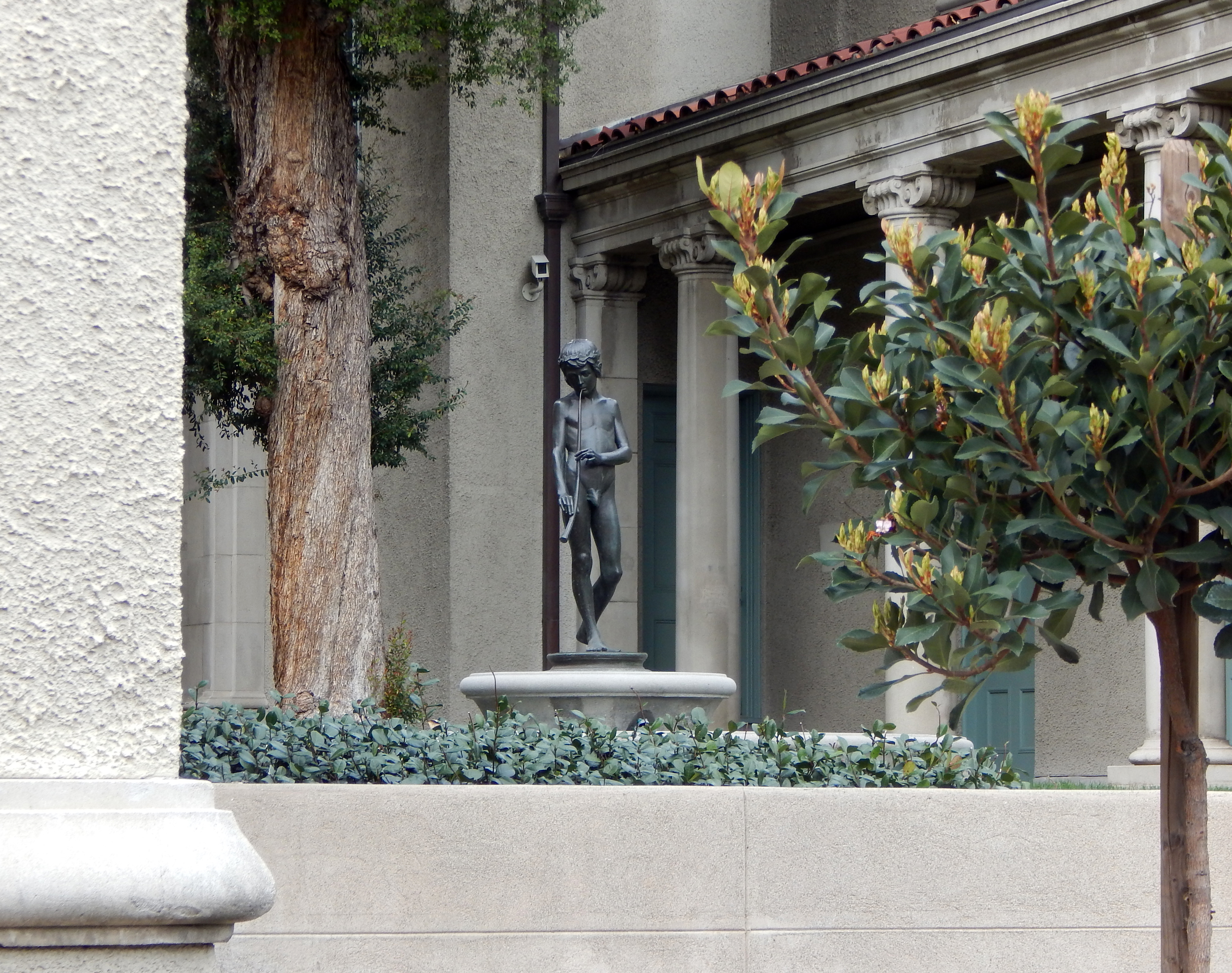
The Spirit of Spanish Music (1916) by Burt Johnson

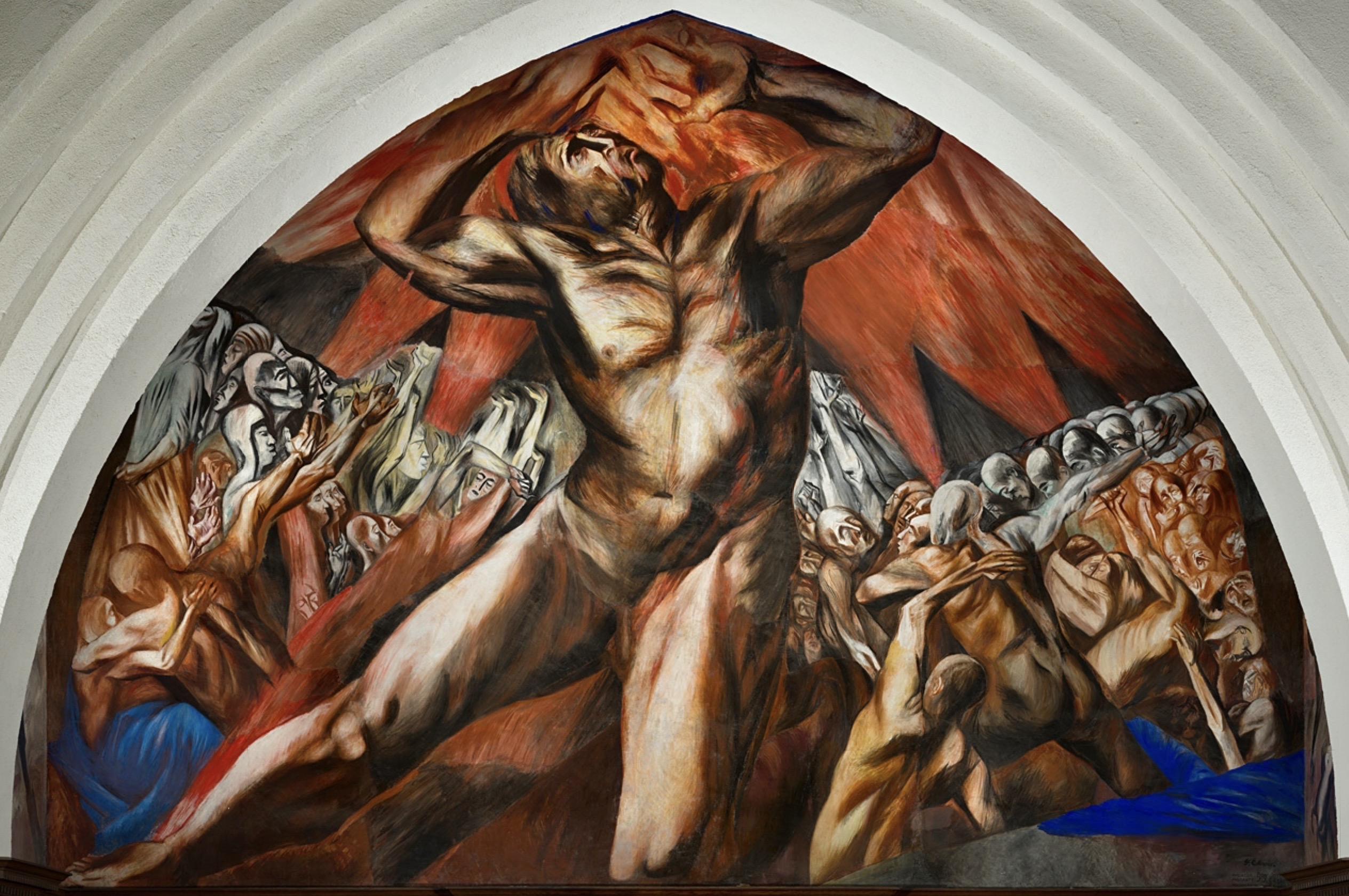
Prometheus (1930) by José Clemente Orozco

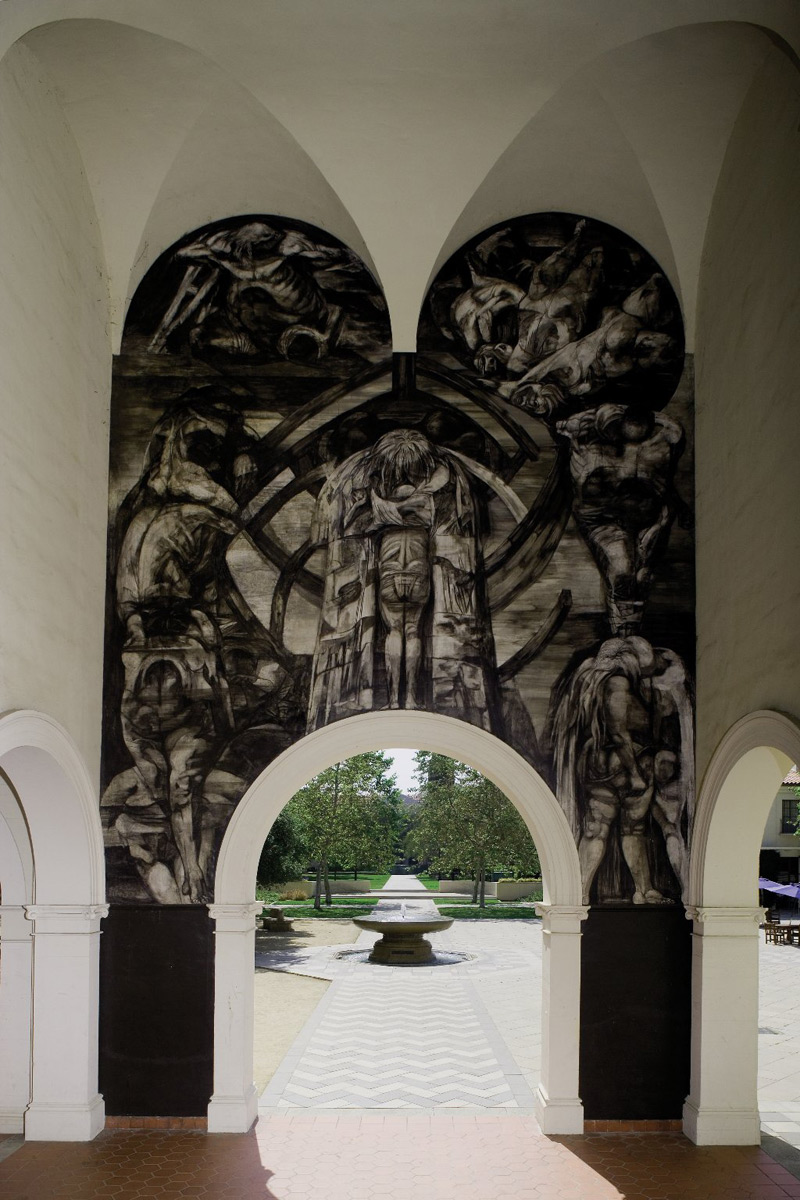
Genesis (1960) by Rico Lebrun

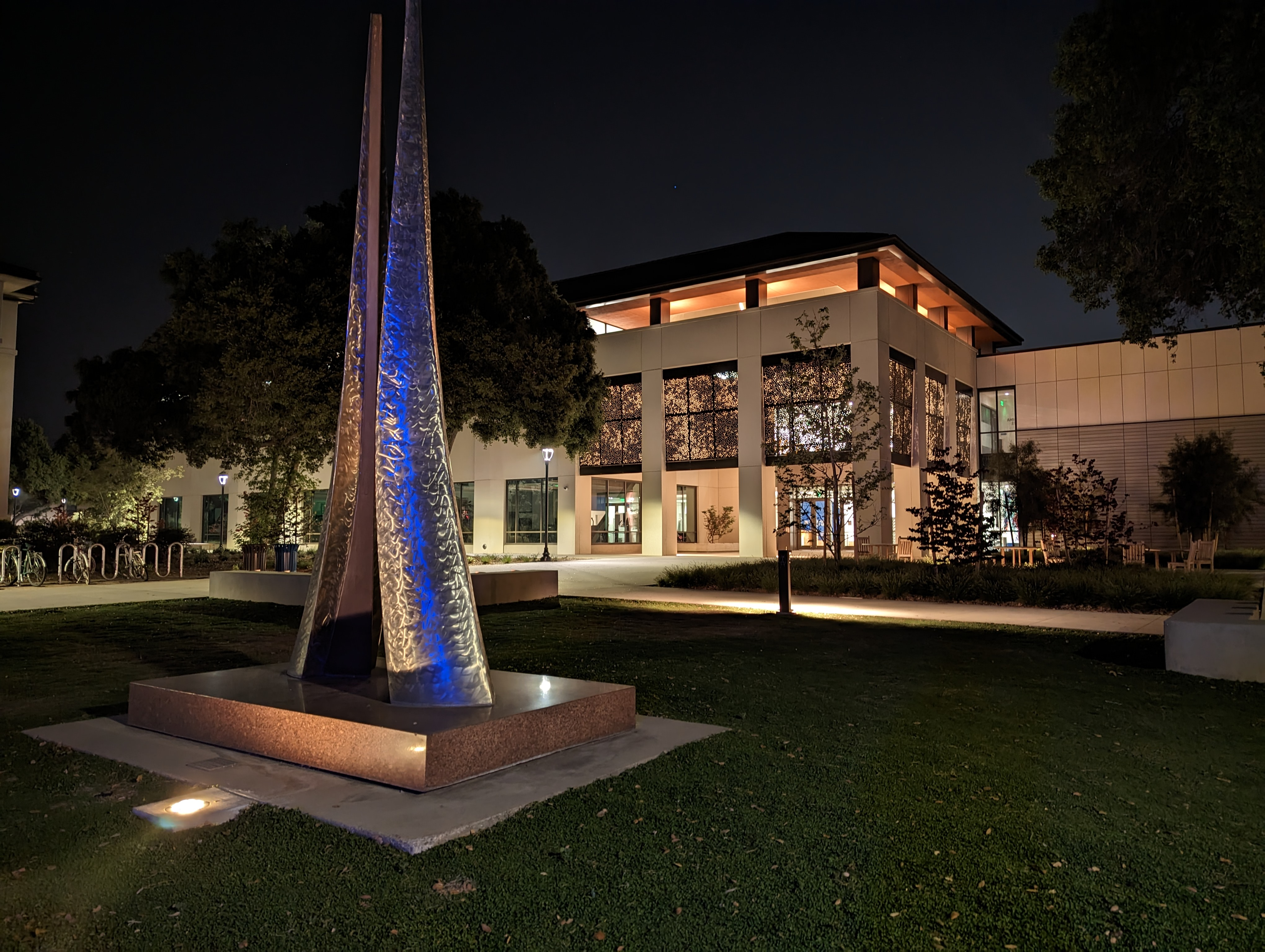
In the Spirit of Excellence (1989) by Norman Hines

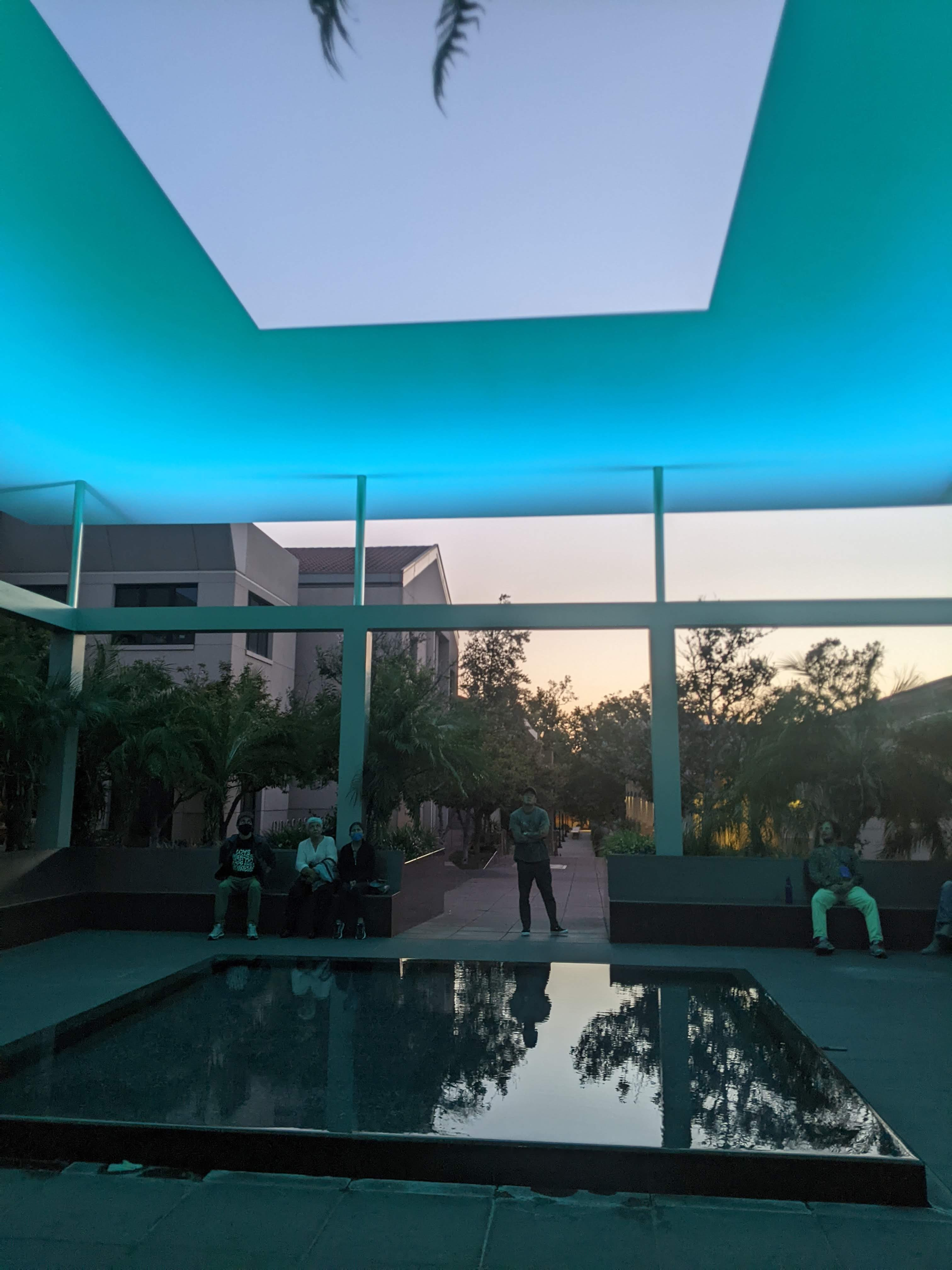
Dividing the Light (2007) by James Turrell

== See also ==
- List of museums in Los Angeles County, California
- Scripps College § Ruth Chandler Williamson Gallery, a sister institution
- Hannah Tempest Jenkins, Pomona's first art professor and founder of the Rembrandt Club
