= Personal Rights in Defense and Education =

Dissolved gay political organization

Personal Rights in Defense and Education (PRIDE) was a gay political organization. It was established in 1966 as a radical gay political organization that from its origination set a new tone for gay political groups like the Gay Liberation Front (GLF), ACT UP and the Radical Faeries. PRIDE led aggressive, unapologetic demonstrations against the oppression by the Los Angeles Police Department (LAPD) of gay gatherings or same-sex meetings in the city of Los Angeles. PRIDE's monthly single-page newsletter evolved into The Advocate, the nation's longest running gay news publication.

== History ==
PRIDE is an acronym for Personal Rights in Defense and Education. The organization was formed in Los Angeles, California in 1966 by Steve Ginsburg. PRIDE, from its very inception, was much more radical than the pre-1960s homosexual rights groups, which were more deferential. PRIDE's goal was to get out on the streets and get in the faces of the opposition with noisy, loud demonstrations and political action, as opposed to the conservative approach taken by its predecessors. The then 27-year-old founder, Steve Ginsburg, made it clear from the start that the organization would not hold back on showing its youthful overt sexuality. Ginsburg set the example for members by wearing his leather gear to run the PRIDE management meetings. This was a new breed of radical activist whose approach gave permission to later groups like the GLF, ACT UP and the Radical Faeries.

The organization's meetings, called "PRIDE NIGHTS", took place at Los Angeles gay bar The HUB. Like many gay bars, The Hub served the gay community in many ways, primarily as place to socialize openly and in relative safety, but also as a place to gather politically and organize gay-related activities, both political and recreational. The bars would often lend their spaces for many non-"bar"-related activities to support the gay community. Ginsberg often used the bar and club scene to connect with gay youth directly. PRIDE strongly defended the gay bars and the gay youth culture that attended them, while older gay groups would not. Since gay youth were mostly excluded by older conservative gay groups, they looked for other outlets, and PRIDE and Ginsberg saw the opportunity to tap into an energetic and under-represented constituency. The organization's core belief was that gays needed a variety of social environments in which to gather. These venues included bars and night clubs, as well as outdoor events, such as hiking, bowling, and other sporting activities. The core beliefs also encompassed the opportunity to marry and the right to access to social services.

Compared to other organizations, PRIDE had greater success at organizing large groups of disenfranchised youth to demonstrate against any group or person that denied the gay community their equal rights or dignity. The LAPD was often targeted because of its aggressive and openly violent oppression of gays. The raid on the Black Cat Tavern in the Silverlake section of Los Angeles on New Year's Eve 1967 was the defining moment for PRIDE Undercover police staked out the bar, waiting for the moment that male patrons kissed each other at midnight. Word went out to waiting police reinforcements and they poured into the bar, assaulting patrons, smashing the furniture and chasing several patrons down the street to another bar called New Faces, where the police knocked the manager (a woman) to the ground and subsequently beat the bartenders. PRIDE acted quickly, organizing large vocal street demonstrations, handing out thousands of leaflets to passing drivers and pedestrians outside the Black Cat Tavern and in the Sunset Junction area. This happened a full two years prior to the gay rights riots at the Stonewall Inn in New York City. PRIDE ran fundraising efforts for the six customers arrested during the raid at the Black Cat Tavern who were convicted. The case went all the way to the United States Supreme Court. The Court refused to hear the case and the convictions were sustained.

"Bill Rau (a.k.a. Bill Rand), Richard Mitch (a.k.a. Dick Michaels), and Sam Winston printed issues at night in the basement print shop at ABC Television West Studios (now Prospect Studios) in Los Feliz"

PRIDE published a newsletter under the guidance of Richard Mitch starting in 1966. The early issues were simply printed on school-style mimeographed press. In late summer of 1967 Richard Mitch and his boyfriend Bill Rau worked to ramp up the PRIDE newsletter into a full gay newspaper. The first issue was only 500 copies. The publication got a new, more official-sounding name, The Los Angeles Advocate. The cover story was entitled "GAY POWER." Eventually PRIDE and its fledgling publication diverged with differing agendas and Richard Mitch, Sam Winston and Bill Rand purchased the rights to the publication for $1.00. The Advocate was now a stand-alone institution and grew to become the first national gay publication. and is still in operation today as a national magazine. as part of the here! media conglomerate, which also includes Out magazine.

In late 1968 PRIDE under tremendous pressure from all sides (gay and straight) to cease its aggressive radical approach and activities was dissolved by its founders.

== Bibliography ==
- Davis, Mike; Wiener, Jon (2020). Set the Night on Fire: L.A. in the Sixties. New York: Verso Books.
