= Victoria Sancho Lobis =

American art historian and curator

Victoria Sancho Lobis (née Victoria Ana-Teresa Sancho; born 1976) is an American art historian and curator. She is the director of the Benton Museum of Art at Pomona College in Claremont, California.

== Early life ==
Lobis was born in 1976 as Victoria Ana-Teresa Sancho, and grew up in Kansas City, Missouri. Her mother emigrated from Costa Rica and her father's family is from Puerto Rico. She attended Yale University, and then earned master's degrees from Williams College and Columbia University and a doctorate in art history from Columbia.

== Career ==
Lobis was a curator at the University of San Diego. She then moved to the Art Institute of Chicago, before returning to Southern California to become the Sarah Rempel and Herbert S. Rempel Director of the Benton Museum of Art at Pomona College and an associate professor of art history at the college.

== Personal life ==
Lobis is married and has a daughter. She lives in Claremont, California.
