= Set the Night on Fire =

2020 book by Mike Davis and Jon Wiener

Set the Night on Fire: L.A. in the Sixties
- Book jacket
- Author: Mike Davis, Jon Wiener
- Audio read by: Ron Butler
- Language: English
- Genre: History
- Publisher: Verso Books (print), Audible Studios (audiobook)
- Publication date: 2020 (Hardcover, Kindle, and Audiobook)
- Publication place: United States
- Media type: Print, Kindle, Audiobook
- Pages: 800pp., 25 hours and 25 minutes audio.
- ISBN: 978-1784780227
- Website: Official book website, Set the Night on Fire at Verso Books.

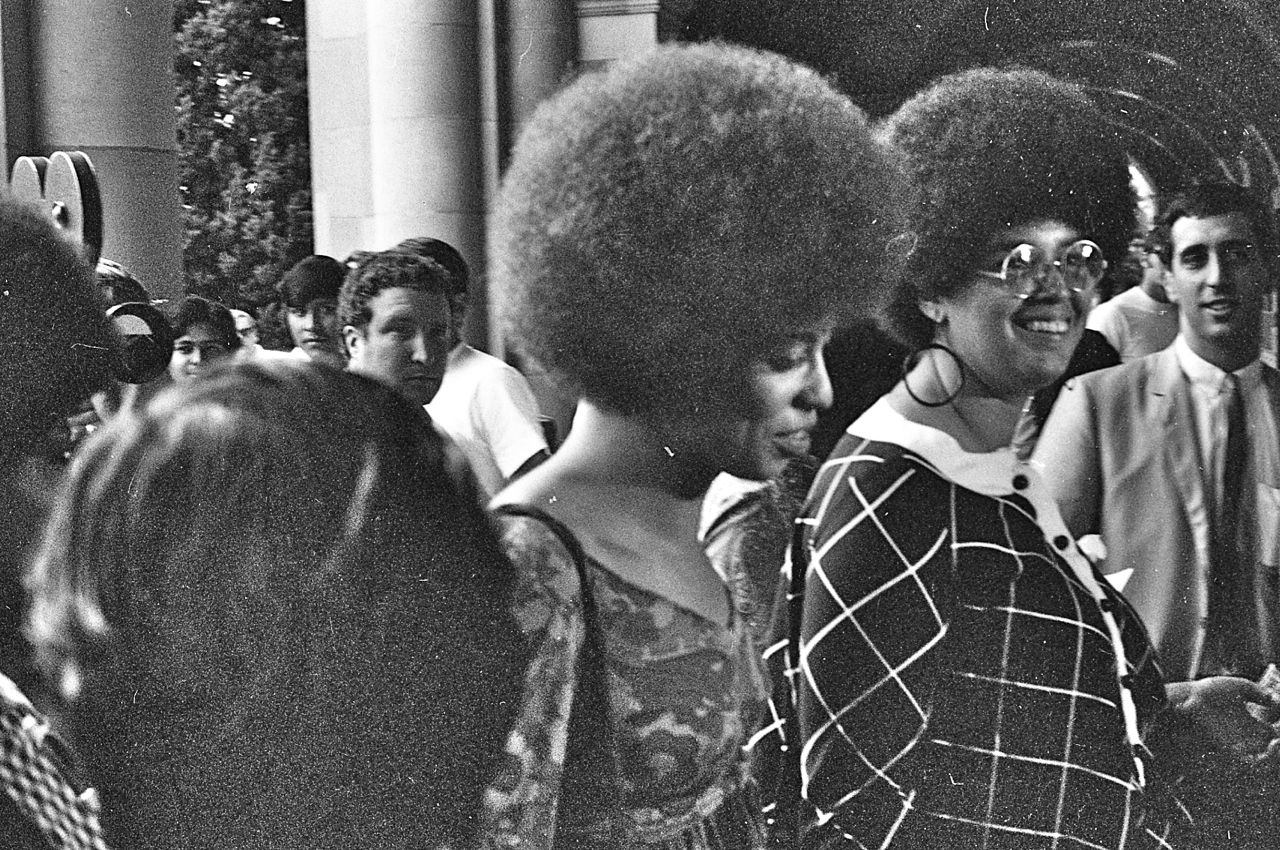
Angela Davis at UCLA (October 1969) to give her first lecture

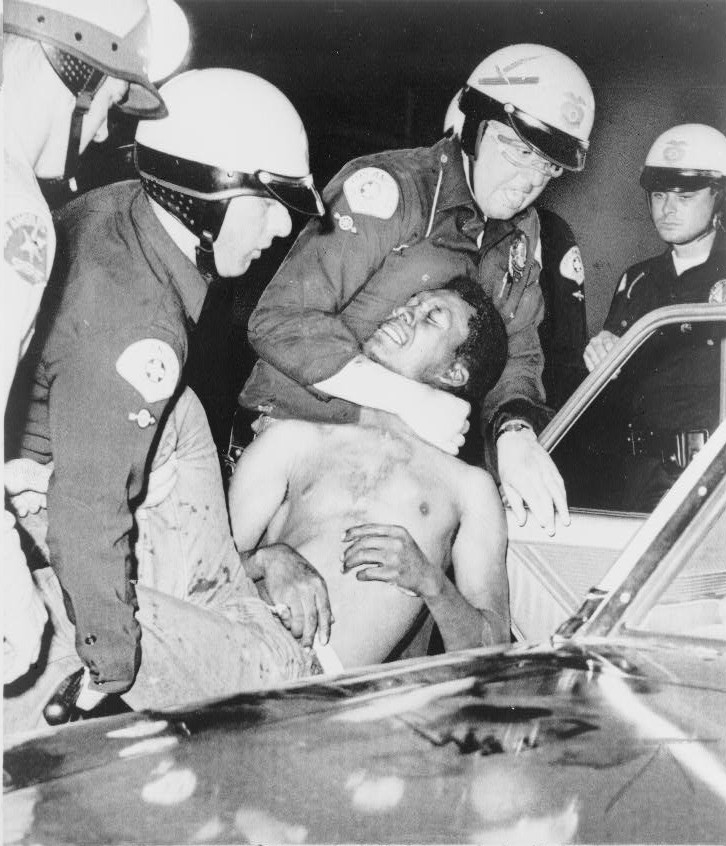
Police violence during the Watts Uprising (August 1965)

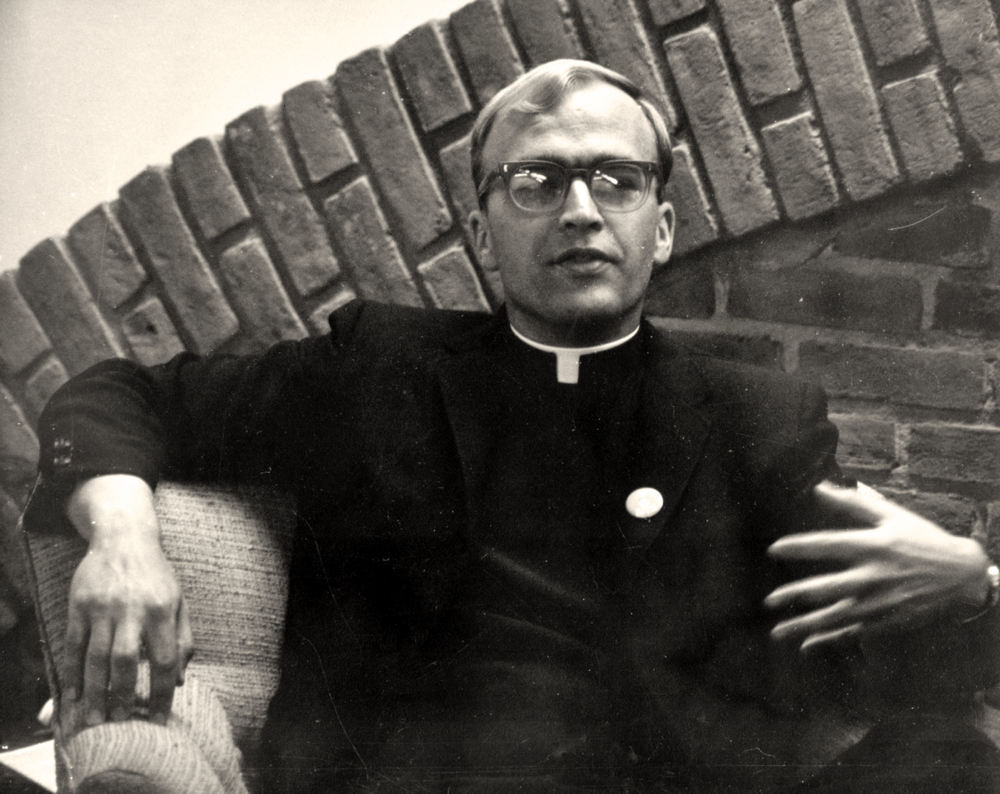
Father William DuBay (1968)

Set the Night on Fire: L.A. in the Sixties is a movement history by Mike Davis and Jon Wiener published in April 2020. The authors combine archival research and personal interviews with their own experiences in the civil rights and anti-war movements to tell the story of this transformative decade. The book's purpose is not to present a comprehensive history of 1960s Los Angeles but to dispel the mythology surrounding this era and replace it with the neglected history of the populist social and cultural movements that shifted power away from an entrenched elite and opened up opportunities for radical egalitarian change.

== Synopsis ==
The book begins with an account of the powers ruling LA in the 1950s—especially the police (the LAPD), and ends with the defeat of mayor Sam Yorty by Tom Bradley in 1973, the city’s first African-American mayor. Post-war LA is usually described as a middle class paradise of suburban living and a booming economy. But people of color lived in a separate world shaped by poverty and police violence which would eventually define the decade.

Set the Night on Fire covers a range of movements—the non-violent direct action campaign seeking the end of segregated housing, the gay rights and women’s liberation movements, the rise of Black Power after the Watts Uprising of 1965, the emergence of alternative media (especially the LA Free Press ("the FREEP")), and tells the stories of anti-war women, draft resisters, activist nuns, and the Chicano students in East LA who led the high school "blowouts" of 1968.

Instead of the familiar sixties L.A. of surfers and show business, the book focuses on the millions of young people of color excluded from good schools and good jobs and their efforts to create a more equal and just city.

The Civil Rights Movement is the primary overall focus of the book. Chapters include essays on Malcolm X and the Nation of Islam (Chapter 4); the inequalities between White and minority communities (Chapters 5–7), with a special focus on the struggle against segregated housing; the roles played by the Congress of Racial Equality, the National Association for the Advancement of Colored People (NAACP), Maulana Karenga and the US Organization, the Student Nonviolent Coordinating Committee (SNCC), and the United Civil Rights Committee; the Watts Uprising and Watts Renaissance (Chapters 13 and 15); the story of Communist Party USA activist Angela Davis (Chapter 27); and the birth of the Chicanx movement in East Los Angeles (Chapters 31–32).

The topics of the press and civil rights intersect in the Watts Uprising. The authors write about the collision:

It wasn't just the editorials in the Times; their reporters in Watts—all white, of course—emphasized the threat from "screaming" mobs of Black "wild men," who were reported to be shouting, "It's too late, white man. You had your chance. Now it's our turn"; "Next time you see us we'll be carrying guns"; and, "We have nothing to lose." The reporter concluded that the mood of Black people in the streets was "sickening." The Freep, for its part, published reports of the uprising written by Blacks—its most significant contribution. One, on the front page, described a corner where four cops were beating a Black man with billy clubs, as a Black crowd gathered, shouting, "Don't kill that man!" Then, "the crowd began to attack the officers." The cops told them, "Go home, niggers." The crowd grew; "The officers first attempted to fight but then ran away." In The Freep's reporting, the Blacks' target was not "whitey" in general; instead they were retaliating against particular LAPD officers who were acting particularly brutally." (Note: Davis & Wiener, Set the Night on Fire: L.A. in the Sixties, pp.177.)

The struggle for women's rights and LGBT equality are covered. The story of police violence at the Black Cat Tavern in 1967 and the resulting burst of LGBT activism in Los Angeles, the founding of The Advocate magazine and the Metropolitan Community Church are covered in Chapter 11, "Before Stonewall: Gay L.A (1964–1970)". While feminism is an ever-present theme in the book, it becomes the focus in chapter 33, "The Many Faces of Women's Liberation (1967–1974)" and the Los Angeles chapter of the National Organization for Women has a prominent place in the narrative, along with the subjects of equal pay and living wages, women's reproductive rights, child care, and prison rehabilitation. The special plight experienced by women of color has a presence throughout the book, but takes a special place here. The subject of religion and its role in the civil rights movement is highlighted by the contrast and struggle between the Metropolitan Community Church, Sister Corita Kent, Father William DuBay, and Cardinal James Francis McIntyre.

The book concludes by returning to the authors' thoughts at the beginning and a summary of the "unrealized hopes of the 1960s"—why the movements achieved what they did and why they failed to achieve all they had hoped to. Jerald Podair writes in the Los Angeles Review of Books,

But as the authors acknowledge, the unrealized hopes of the 1960s are also rooted in the incompatibilities and inconsistencies of the component parts of the movements themselves. Set the Night on Fire is filled with terrible ifs and might-have-beens. Perhaps the most heartbreaking was the inability of the African-American and Latino communities, each experiencing profound cultural and political change, to forge enduring alliances. As the authors ruefully conclude, 'One can only speculate about how L.A. history might have played out if the Southside and the Eastside had been able to build a common agenda'.

== Reviews ==
- Sean Dempsey (April 26, 2020). "Review: Exploring the radical politics of Los Angeles in the 1960's". America Magazine.
- Ben Ehrenreich (April 27, 2020). "Set the Night on Fire by Mike Davis and Jon Wiener review – the real LA in the 1960s". The Guardian.
- Samuel Farber. "The Many Explosions of Los Angeles in the 1960s". Jacobin.. "Mike Davis and Jon Wiener's chronicle of Los Angeles in the 1960s, Set the Night on Fire, isn't just a stunning portrait of a city in upheaval half a century ago. It's a history of uprisings for civil rights, against poverty, and for a better world that speaks directly to our current moment of mass protest."
- Dana Goodyear (April 24, 2020). "Mike Davis in the Age of Catastrophe". The New Yorker.
- Erik Himmelsbach-Weinstein (April 13, 2020). "Review: How L.A.'s '60s movements fought for justice — and sometimes even achieved it". The Los Angeles Times.. "The '60s are remembered as a perfect storm of rebellion, but our memories are often shaped by repetitive archival news footage tattooed onto our brains. "Set the Night on Fire" fills in many blanks, focusing mostly on the movements emerging from South and East L.A.—the struggle for fair housing, the fight to integrate schools and jobs—while also excavating the forgotten core of L.A. resistance, illuminating those who often took life-risking steps to expose injustice."
- Jerald Podair (April 14, 2020). "The Fire and the Fizzle". Los Angeles Review of Books.
- Jeff Roquen (June 8, 2020). "Book Review: Set the Night on Fire: L.A. in the Sixties by Mike Davis and Jon Wiener". London School of Economics.. "Beyond a chronicle of a metropolis or an era, Set the Night on Fire thoroughly illustrates the myriad dynamics of inequality, exposes the short- and long-term consequences of discrimination and offers hope in overcoming socio-economic divisions through unyielding activism for equal rights and equal justice"
- Lew Whittington (April 14, 2020). "Review: Set the Night on Fire: L.A. in the Sixties". New York Journal of Books.

=== Awards and recognition ===
- Set the Night on Fire was a Los Angeles Times Best Seller.

== About the author ==
Mike Davis (1946–2022) was an American writer, political activist, urban theorist, and historian. He is best known for his investigations of power and social class in his native Southern California. Jon Wiener (born 1944) is an American historian and journalist based in Los Angeles.

== See also ==
- Outline of the history of Los Angeles
- Bibliography of Los Angeles
- City of Quartz
- History of Los Angeles
- Personal Rights in Defense and Education
