= Caelum Moor =

Sculpture in Arlington, Texas

Coordinates: 32°45′04″N 97°05′16″W

Caelum Moor is a sculpture by Norman Hines in Arlington, Texas. It was completed in 1986 and consists of five large stone arrangements placed around a 5-acre (2.0 ha) park.
