= Judy Fiskin =

American photography and video artist

- Born: Judy Bartman; April 1, 1945 (age 81); Chicago IL, U.S.
- Education: B.A. Pomona College
- Occupation: Photographer
- Spouse: Jon Wiener
- Parent(s): Cecile and Fred A. Bartman

Judy Fiskin (born April 1, 1945 in Chicago, Illinois) is an American artist working in photography and video, and a member of the art school faculty at California Institute of the Arts. Her videos have been screened in the Documentary Fortnight series at the Museum of Modern Art in New York, at the Los Angeles County Museum of Art, the Hammer Museum in Los Angeles, and at the J. Paul Getty Museum in Los Angeles; her photographs have been shown at MOCA, the Museum of Contemporary Art in Los Angeles, at the Getty Museum in Los Angeles, at The New Museum in New York City, and at the Pompidou Center in Paris.

== Biography ==
Born Judy Bartman, the daughter of Cecile and Fred A. Bartman. She was raised in Los Angeles and graduated from Pomona College, where her classmates included future artists Chris Burden and James Turrell. She got a master's degree in art history at UCLA, compiled and edited the journals of Richard Neutra, and was co-director of Womanspace Gallery in the mid-1970s. She started teaching photography in the art school at Cal Arts in 1977. In addition to her photography and video, she's also an award-winning writer for her essay "Borges, Stryker, Evans: The Sorrows of Representation."

== Photography ==
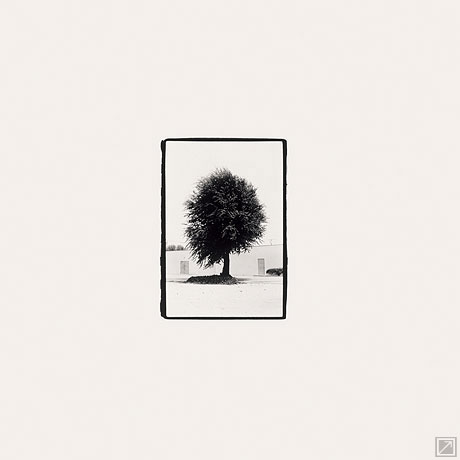
Judy Fiskin, Untitled from the series "31 Views of San Bernardino," 1974.

Since her first show at Castelli Graphics in New York City in 1976, Fiskin's photographs have had the same distinctive format: small black-and-white images, two and one-half inches square, printed on letter-sized white paper. She began with vernacular architecture in Los Angeles and gained critical attention for her "Dingbat" series, anonymous small 1950s apartment buildings (of the dingbat type) in Los Angeles shot from across the street in a deadpan style. Other series focused on desert scenes, military buildings, and period furniture. In 1992, MOCA in Los Angeles held a mid-career retrospective for Fiskin; critics praised the intelligence, wit, and stylistic coherence of her work. Her photographs have been exhibited widely, including the Pompidou Center in Paris displaying 24 prints as part of their historic 2006 exhibit, "Los Angeles 1955-1985, Birth of an Art Capital," and MOCA Los Angeles displayed 15 prints in their 2009-2010 show "Collection: MOCA's First 30 Years." Her photos were shown at five Pacific Standard Time exhibitions in 2011 and 2012: "Under the Big Black Sun: California Art 1974-81," at The Museum of Contemporary Art, Los Angeles; "In Focus: Los Angeles, 1945-1980," at The J. Paul Getty Museum, Los Angeles; "It Happened at Pomona: Art at the Edge of Los Angeles 1969-1973," at Pomona College Museum of Art, Claremont; "Seismic Shift: California Landscape Photography, 1944-1984" at the California Museum of Photography at UC Riverside, and "Civic Virtue: The Impact of the Los Angeles Municipal Art Gallery and the Watts Towers Arts Center" at the Los Angeles Municipal Art Gallery, Los Angeles. One of Fiskin's photos was featured in the Los Angeles Times article "50 Masterpieces at LACMA" in 2015.

== Video ==
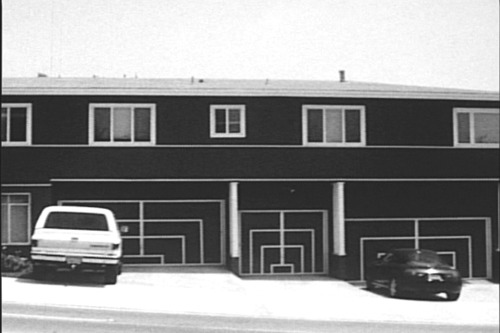
image from Judy Fiskin's video "The End of Photography," 2007.

Fiskin began making video in 1998 with "Diary of a Midlife Crisis," a serio-comic video diary about a middle-aged photographer whose fear of moving the video camera provided a metaphor for her feeling of being creatively at a standstill. The video won awards at the San Francisco International Film Festival and at Worldfest Houston, and was screened at MOCA in Los Angeles, and in Bonn, Kassel, and Brisbane, among other places. Critical acclaim for that work led the J. Paul Getty Museum to commission the video installation "My Getty Center" in 2000, another comic personal video diary that chronicled the opening of the new Getty Center in Los Angeles. LACMA commissioned "What We Think About When We Think About Ships," a video installation at LACMALab based on a painting in its collection. Her 2003 video "50 Ways to Set the Table" documented the competition in table setting at the Los Angeles County Fair – a metaphor for the creative process and the work of the critic. That video has been screened in the Documentary Fortnight series at the Museum of Modern Art in New York, at the South by Southwest Festival in Austin, at the Berkeley Film and Video Festival and at Angles Gallery, Santa Monica. Her 2007 video, "The End of Photography," a three-minute elegy for the darkroom, was exhibited in Paris, Berlin, Kassel, and in Los Angeles at the Getty, LACMA, MOCA, and at Angles Gallery. "Like all great works of art," David Pagel wrote in a review in the Los Angeles Times, the video "tells more than one story." In her 2010 video, "Guided Tour," which premiered at Angles Gallery in Los Angeles, the voices of two museum docents seem to describe various works of high and low art. "By turns poetic and funny," Fiskin said, "the film is about the talk around art and the mute beauty of photography, the disconcerting ties between kitsch and art, and the ultimate inadequacy of all kinds of description." Christopher Knight, art critic for the L.A. Times, called the video "inspired… a surprising journey into your own conflicted assumptions about substance and significance." "All Six Films" ran at Angles Gallery in Los Angeles in September 2011; that show was named to a "Best of 2011" list in ArtForum. Fiskin’s video "I’ll Remember Mama" is featured in the Hammer Museum Biennial, "Made in L.A. 2014." The video, an autobiographical account of loss and change, is a meditation on the eventual death of her mother – the objects that she will leave behind and the memories and knowledge that will disappear with her death. As a part of "Made in LA 2014," the Hammer also screened Fiskin’s "Art Talk Trilogy" – her videos "My Getty Center," "50 Ways to Set the Table" and "Guided Tour." Fiskin’s Hammer video and other works were the subject of an interview with Tyler Green on the Modern Art Notes podcast.

== Books ==
The Getty published Some Aesthetic Decisions: The Photographs of Judy Fiskin, by Virginia Heckert, in 2011. The volume includes reproductions of nearly three hundred images taken from 1973 to 1995. Since Fiskin turned to video in the late 1990s, this compendium represents her complete photographic oeuvre, including many images never before published.

== Artist's Books, Exhibition Catalogues and Monographs ==
Virginia Heckert, Some Aesthetic Decisions: The Photographs of Judy Fiskin. Getty Publications, December 2011. ISBN 1606060813. https://web.archive.org/web/20140730015755/http://shop.getty.edu/products/some-aesthetic-decisions-978-1606060810

Paul Schimmel, et al., Under the Big Black Sun: California Art, 1974-1981. Los Angeles, Prestel Publishing, 2011, pp. 150–151. (2 reproductions from 1975 "Military Architecture" series.)

Rebecca Peabody, et al., Pacific Standard Time: Los Angeles Art, 1945-1980, Los Angeles, Getty Research Institute, 2011, p. 275. (1 reproduction from "Military Architecture," plus 1982 LAICA journal cover.)

"Judy Fiskin Interviewed by Rebecca McGrew." It Happened at Pomona: Art at the Edge of Los Angeles 1969-1973. Pomona College Museum of Art, 2011, 282-87. (includes 5 reproductions from the 1973 "Stucco" series.)

Lyn Kienholz, L.A. Rising: SoCal Artists Before 1980. California/International Arts Foundation, 2010, p. 185.

Ann Goldstein et al., This is Not to be Looked At: Highlights from the collection of the Museum of Contemporary Art. MOCA Press, Los Angeles, 2008, pp. 98–99.

Karen Higa, Living Flowers: Ikebana and Contemporary Art. Japanese-American National Museum, Los Angeles, 2009, pp. 5, 44-45

Catherine Grenier, ed., Los Angeles 1955 - 1985: Birth of an Art Capital. exhibition catalog from the Centre Pompidou, 2006, pp. 251, 290-291.

Lisa Lyons, "Judy Fiskin: My Getty Center." in Departures: 11 Artists at the Getty. exhibition catalogue from the Getty Museum, Los Angeles, 2000, pp. 24–27.

Judy Fiskin, Some More Art. Museum of Contemporary Art, Los Angeles, 1992.

William Bartman, ed., Judy Fiskin. A.R.T. Press, Los Angeles, 1988. Essay by Christopher Knight. Interview with John Divola. 26 reproductions of work from 1973-1988.

Judy Fiskin and Dick Barnes, Thirty-one Views of San Bernardino. Los Angeles: Spectator Press, Pomona College, 1975
