= Jon Wiener =

American historian and journalist (born 1944)

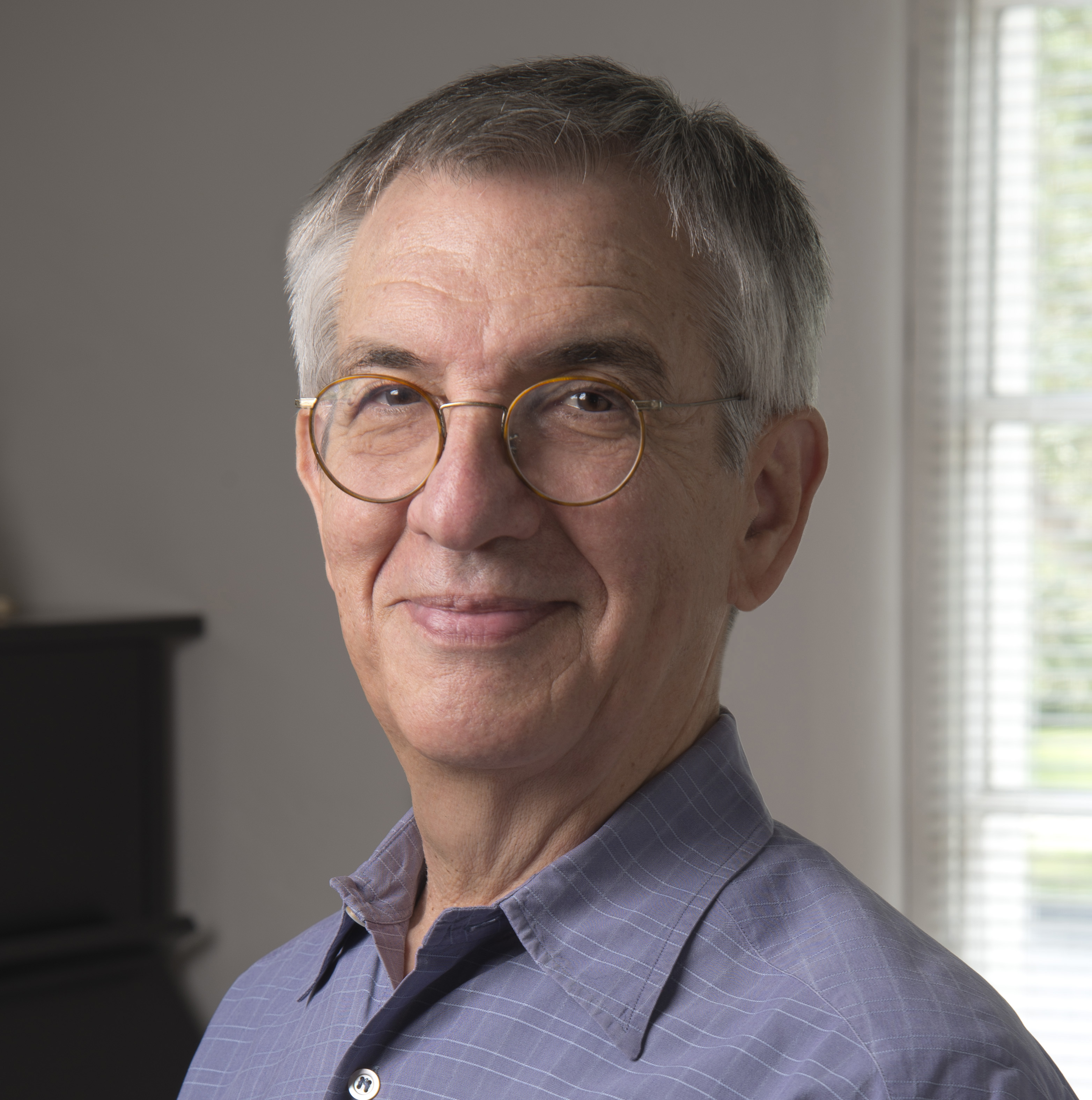
- Born: May 16, 1944 (age 82); Saint Paul, Minnesota, U.S.
- Education: Princeton University (BA) Harvard University (PhD)
- Occupations: Historian; Writer
- Years active: 38+
- Employer: University of California, Irvine
- Spouse: Judy Fiskin
- Website: www.jonwiener.com

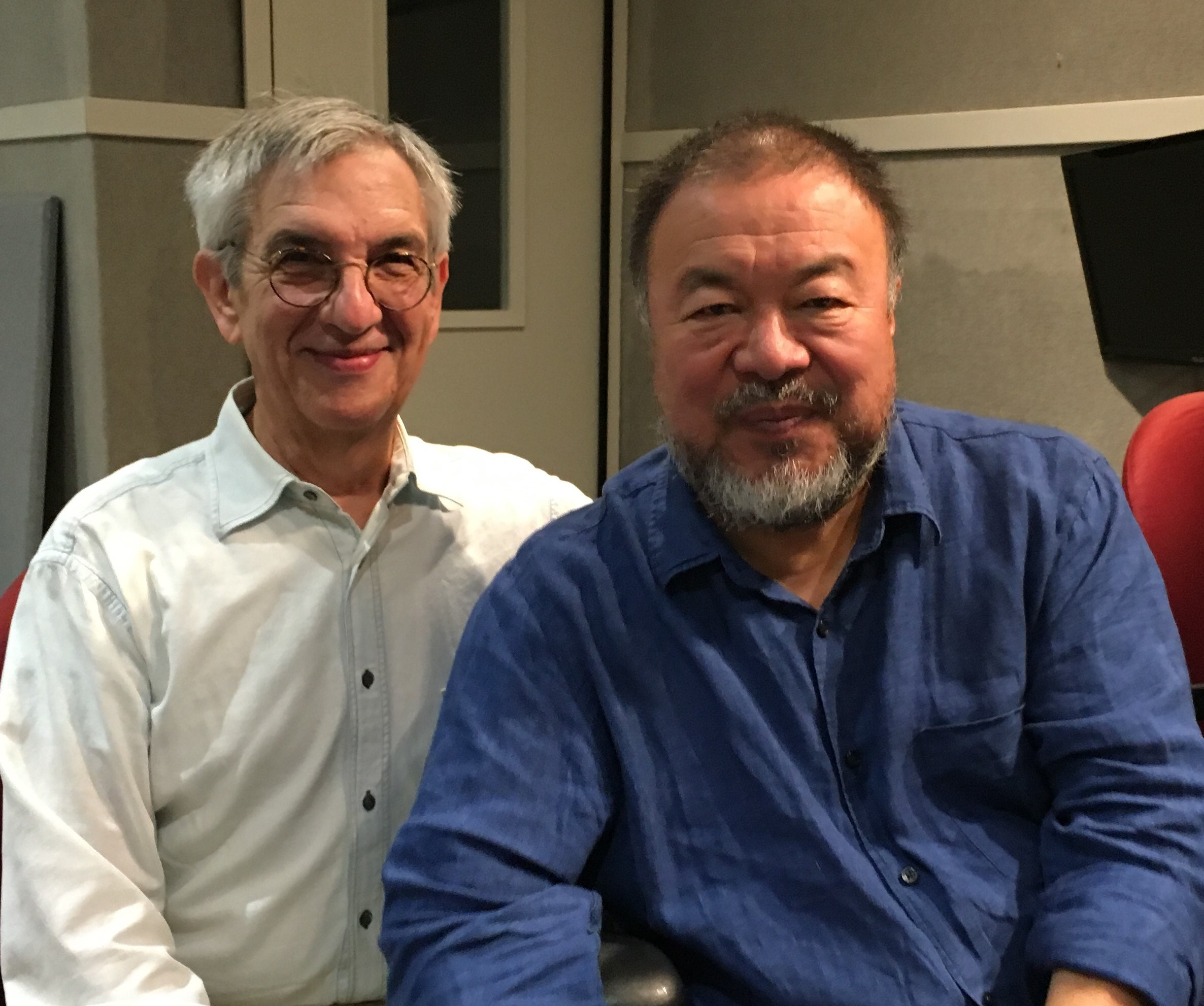
Jon Wiener with Chinese dissent artist Ai Wei Wei at KPFK, 2017

Jon Wiener (born May 16, 1944) is an American historian and journalist based in Los Angeles, California. He is currently a professor emeritus of U.S. history at the University of California, Irvine. His most recent book is Set the Night on Fire: L.A. in the Sixties, a Los Angeles Times bestseller co-authored by Mike Davis. He waged a 25-year legal battle to win the release of the FBI's files on John Lennon. Wiener played a key role in efforts to expose the surveillance, as well as the behind-the-scenes battling between the government and the former Beatle, and is an expert on the FBI-versus-Lennon controversy. Wiener is a contributing editor for the progressive magazine The Nation and hosts the publication's weekly podcast, Start Making Sense. He also hosts a weekly radio program in Los Angeles.

Set the Night on Fire (2020) is a movement history of Los Angeles. The book chronicles the city's involvement in the civil rights, Black power, Chicano rights, women's liberation, gay liberation, and anti-war movements, as well as the battles between young people and the Los Angeles Police Department (LAPD) on Sunset Strip and Venice Beach. The counterculture provides another focus—the Ash Grove folk music club, the LA Free Press, KPFK radio and the Free Clinic.

== Early life ==
Wiener was born in Saint Paul, Minnesota, the son of Jewish parents Gladys (née Aronsohn) and Dr. Daniel Wiener. He graduated from Central High School.

Wiener attended Princeton University in New Jersey, where he founded a chapter of the Students for a Democratic Society (SDS) to protest the Vietnam War. He received a bachelor's degree from Princeton in 1966, and earned a Ph.D. from Harvard, where he worked with Barrington Moore Jr. and Michael Walzer, and also wrote for the underground paper The Old Mole.

== Career ==
=== Academic career ===
At the University of California, Irvine, Wiener taught history courses on American politics and the Cold War. His scholarly works have been published in The American Historical Review, The Journal of American History, Radical History Review, and Past & Present. He led students on visits to the Nixon Library.

=== Journalism and political commentary ===
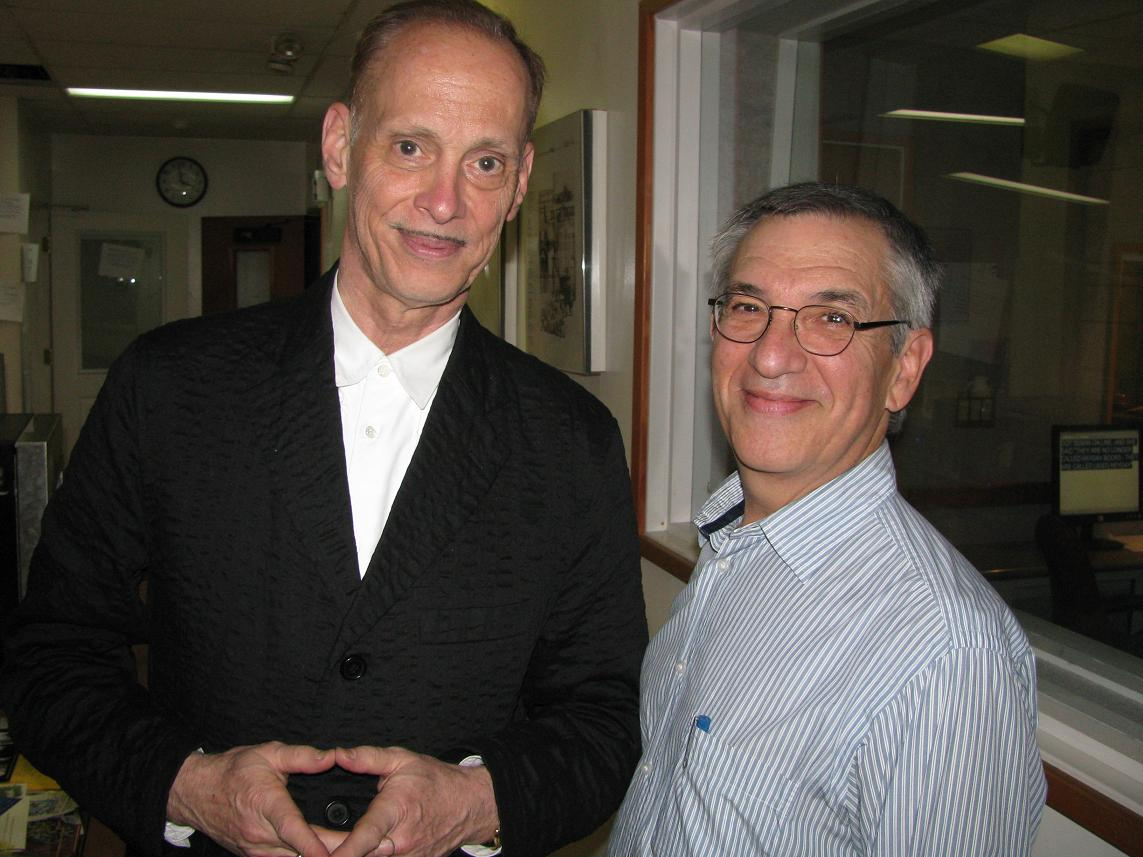
Wiener with John Waters, an American film director, screenwriter, author, actor, stand-up comedian, journalist, visual artist, and art collector, in 2010

Since 1984, Wiener has been a contributing editor for The Nation magazine, where he has written about diverse topics including campus issues, intellectual controversies, and Southern California politics. His writing has also appeared in The Guardian, The New York Times Magazine, The New Republic, and the Los Angeles Times. He regularly publishes reviews of books pertaining to the American political left in the 1960s and '70s.

Wiener has hosted a weekly podcast called "Start Making Sense" for The Nation, and a weekly radio program for Pacifica Radio station KPFK 90.7 FM in Los Angeles.

In his journalism, Wiener, writing in the Los Angeles Times at the beginning of 2020, predicted that 2020 would be "The Worst Year of Trump’s Life." He interviewed Chinese dissident artist Ai Wei Wei about the international refugee crisis—the subject of Ai's film Human Flow. He interviewed Georgia's voting rights organizer Stacey Abrams about her work. He also spoke with the novelist Margaret Atwood about “the shocking relevance of The Handmaid’s Tale.

Wiener has also written on historical topics. On the 50th anniversary of the My Lai Massacre, he wrote about the "forgotten hero" who stopped the massacre, quoting from his interview for KPFK with U.S. Army helicopter pilot Hugh Thompson Jr. He wrote for The New York Times Book Review about how the 1960s are remembered in the U.S. While Wiener is perhaps best known for his efforts to expose the FBI's surveillance of John Lennon, he also was instrumental in getting the FBI to release documents about its surveillance of comedian Groucho Marx.

=== Wiener and the Lennon FBI files ===
Chronology of Wiener v. FBI
Dates	Event	Notes
1969	Lennon releases the single "Give Peace a Chance"	
1971–1972	FBI closely monitors Lennon	
1972-03-06	INS tries to deport Lennon	
1973-03	Judge rules Lennon must leave US in two months	
1973-06	Lennon countersues US	
1976-06	Lennon wins countersuit; can stay in US	
1980-12-10	John Lennon murdered	
1981	Wiener researches book on Lennon	
1981	Wiener requests documents Gets some, most held back	
1981	Wiener sues FBI to release documents	
1983	FBI claims national security danger	
1991	9th circuit court: FBI didn't show "adequate grounds" for secrecy	
1992	Justice Dept appeals 9th Circuit decision to Supreme Court	
1992	Court refuses appeal, sides with Wiener/ACLU	
1997	FBI releases more documents except for ten documents	
2000	Report: Lennon may have secretly funded IRA says MI5 doubted by Lennon supporters	
2004	Federal judge orders remaining ten documents released	
2004	FBI agrees to release final 10 documents	
2006-12-20	FBI releases final eight or ten documents	
2006	The U.S. Versus John Lennon; Documentary; Wiener is consultant	
2006-12-21	Wiener discussed contents of declassified material on NPR	

==== Background ====
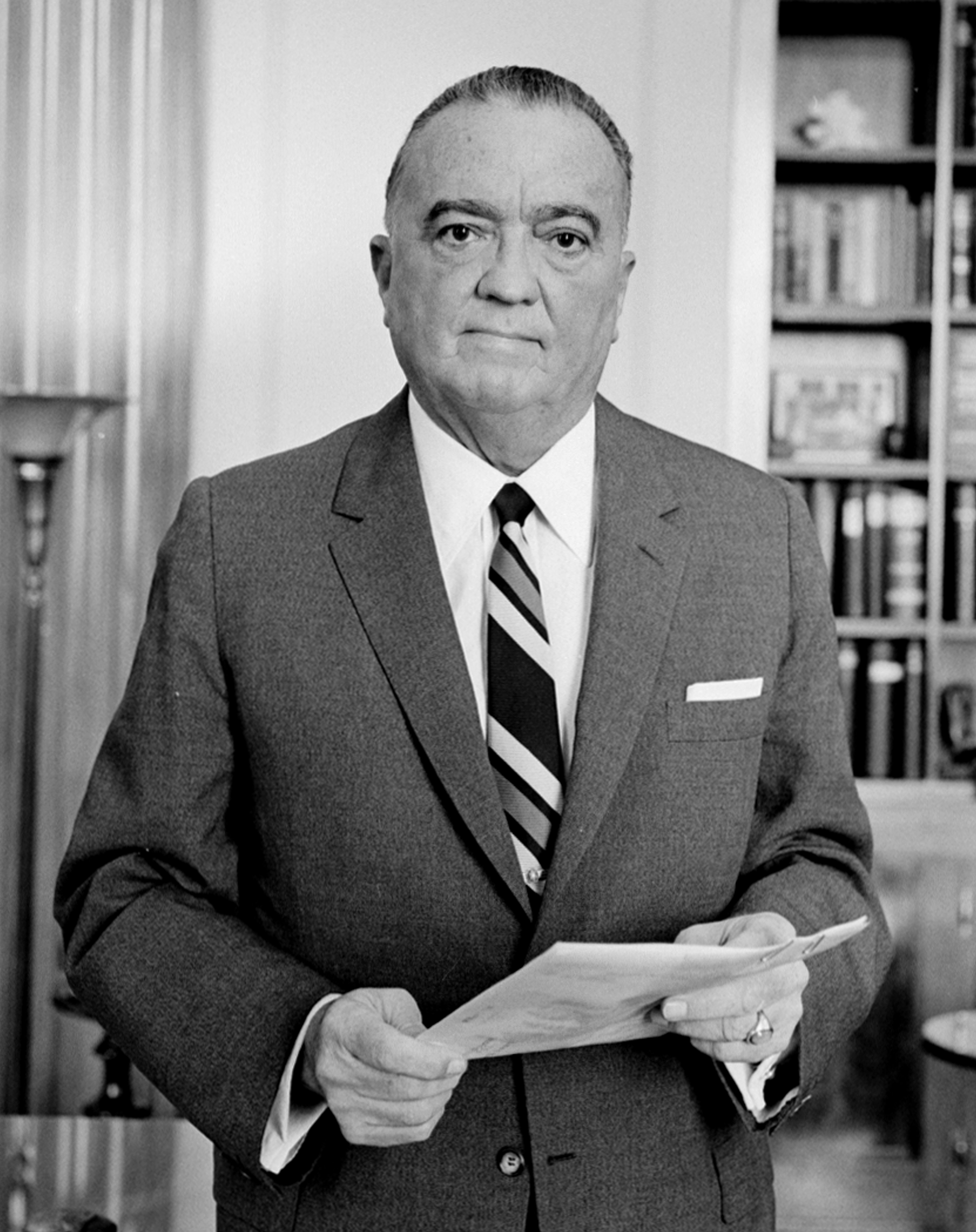
According to one report, FBI chief J. Edgar Hoover sent a memo to Nixon's chief of staff describing Lennon as a sympathizer of Trotskyist communists in England.

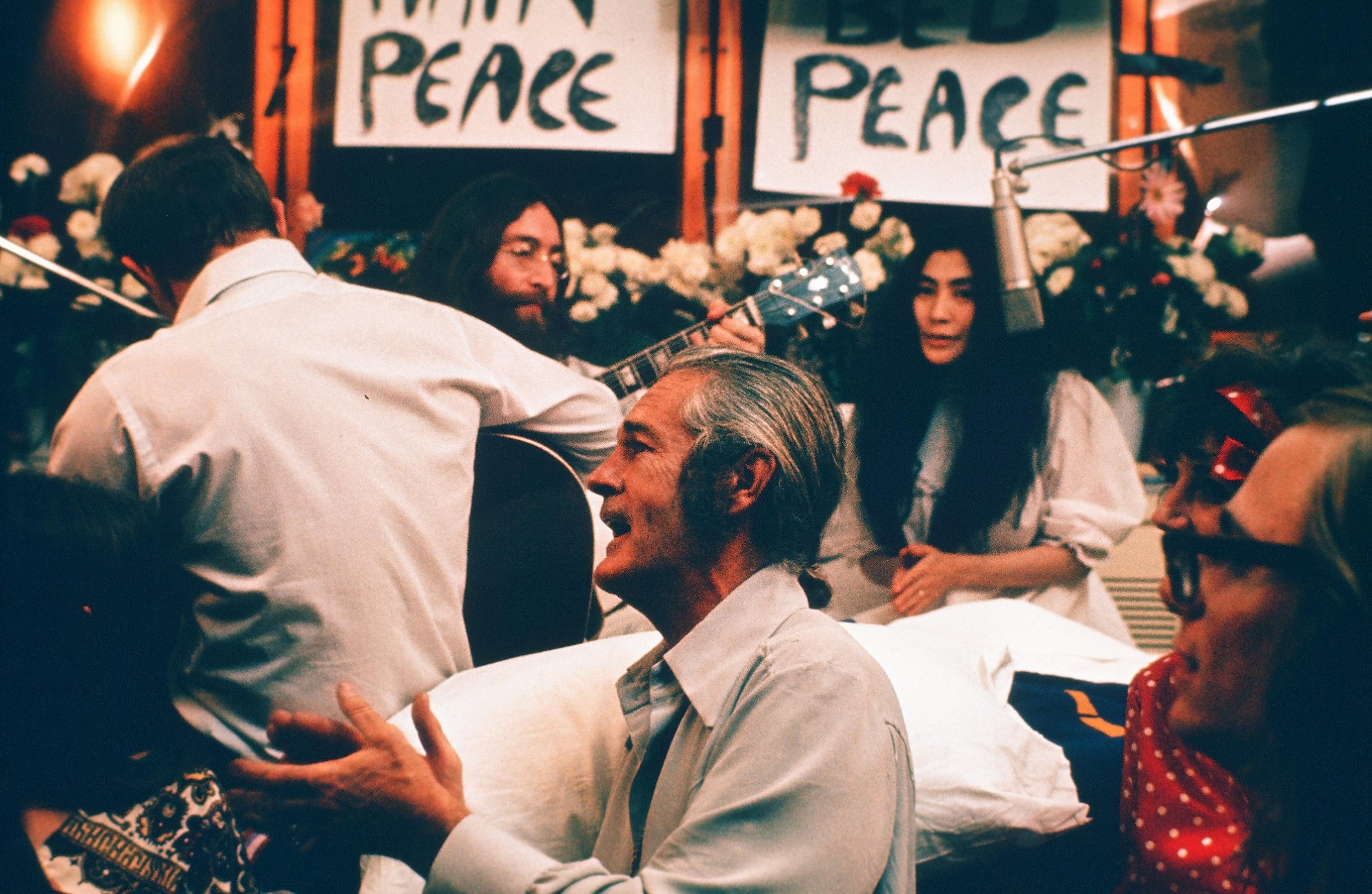
John and Yoko Lennon recording the song Give Peace a Chance in 1969

The legal battle between Wiener and the United States government was waged over two and a half decades, and has been examined by other historians. In the late sixties, many young Americans became opposed to the Vietnam War, and John Lennon became an antiwar advocate who made then-president Richard Nixon nervous about his reelection prospects in 1972. The consensus view is that Nixon asked the FBI to begin surveillance of Lennon, possibly after Lennon went to New York on a visa and met up with radical anti-war activists.

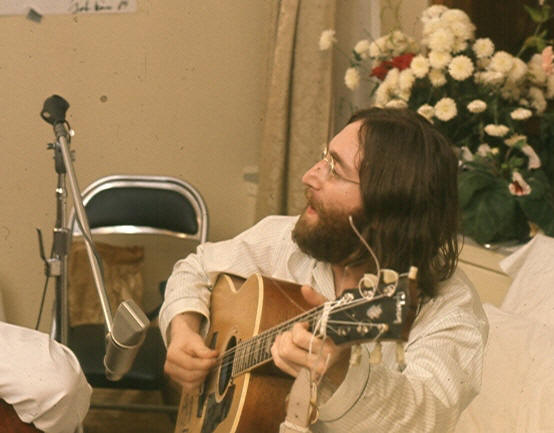
It is likely that Lennon was unaware of the FBI surveillance during the early 1970s.

Government surveillance of Lennon was extensive, although there was no documentary evidence of wiretapping, and lasted about 11 months.

==== The attempt to deport Lennon ====
The Immigration and Naturalization Service (INS), acting on a suggestion from Senator Strom Thurmond, and probably at the behest of Richard Nixon, ordered Lennon to be deported in the spring of 1972. According to Wiener's account, the key issue for the Nixon administration was that Lennon had been talking to anti-war leaders about a "tour that would combine rock music with anti-war organizing and voter registration," possibly as a way to court first-time eighteen-year-old voters, who were believed to have a tendency to vote for the Democratic party.

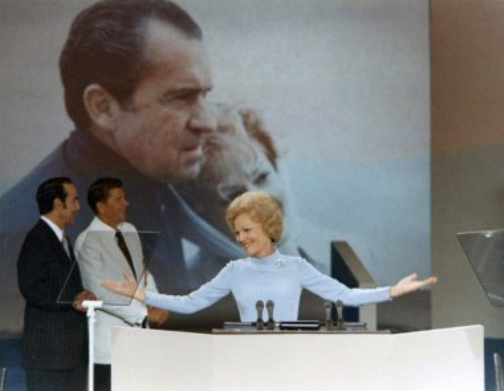
The Republican National Convention in August 1972; Nixon's wife Pat Nixon addressed the crowd. Nixon was reelected in November 1972.

Reporter Adam Cohen writing in 2006 in The New York Times agreed that the FBI surveillance of Lennon had been motivated not only by antiwar concerns but by concerns of a political nature. According to Cohen, what was most revealing was that the timing of these events suggested there was an underlying political motivation behind the surveillance and deportation proceedings. Numerous friends, including Bob Dylan, wrote letters to the INS advocating that Lennon should be allowed to stay. On December 8, 1972, after Nixon's reelection in November, the FBI closed its investigation of Lennon, partially because Lennon has shown "inactivity in Revolutionary Activities." According to Wiener, the FBI had succeeded in "neutralizing" Lennon's opposition to Nixon's reelection. John Lennon was murdered in December 1980.

==== Wiener vs. the FBI ====
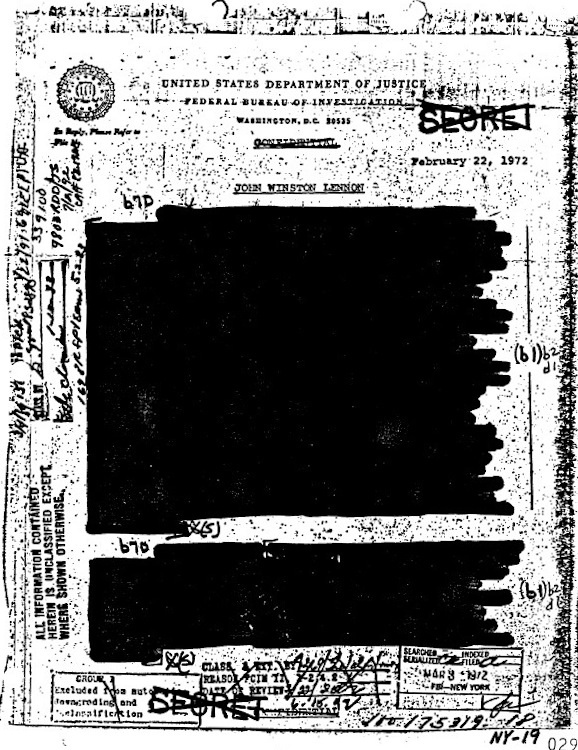
The FBI released heavily blacked out, or redacted, pages of the Lennon FBI file, including this one, initially in response to Jon Wiener's Freedom of Information request.

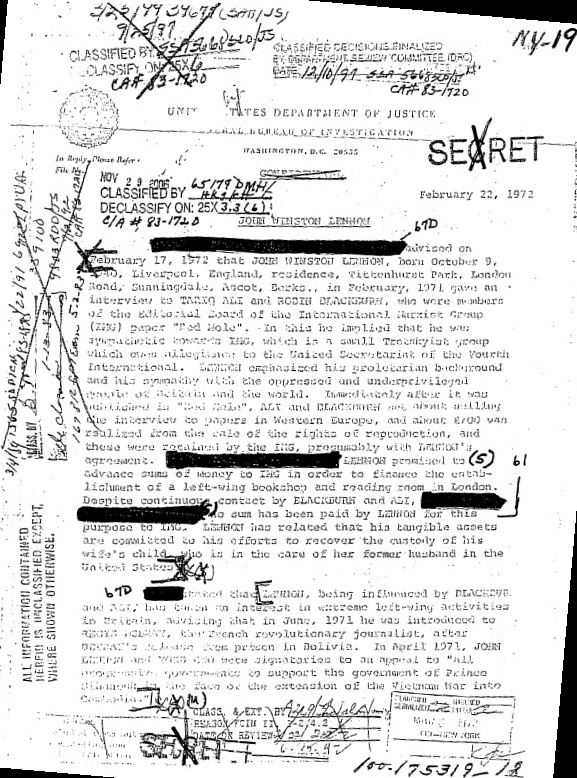
Wiener received this less-heavily blacked out copy of the same file page after more than a decade of litigation by the ACLU of Southern California.

In 1981, while conducting research for a book about John Lennon, Wiener learned of the FBI surveillance, and that there were either 281 or 400 pages of files on the ex-Beatle. Wiener requested the release of the FBI's files on Lennon by citing the Freedom of Information Act. The FBI refused to release two-thirds or 199 pages of the files on the grounds that they contained "national security" information. The pages that were released were heavily blacked out with magic marker, or redacted.

In 1983, Wiener sued the FBI under the Freedom of Information Act with assistance from the ACLU of Southern California, in a case known as Wiener v FBI. In response, the FBI turned over some documents, but withheld others claiming they contained "national security information provided by a foreign government under an explicit promise of confidentiality" and added that releasing the documents could lead to "military retaliation against the United States."

Wiener chronicled much of his frustration with getting documents in his 1984 book Come Together including many "Orwellian moments" during the "tortoise-like progress" of the lawyers. While Wiener lost many of the early "skirmishes", a turning point came in 1991 when the 9th Circuit appeals court ruled in his favor, and declared that the FBI had failed to provide "adequate grounds" to keep the data secret. The papers, withheld 25 years, don't seem to bear that out.</ref> As a result, the FBI had to keep filing affidavits which had "sufficient detail" which allowed Wiener to keep advocating for their release, and for judges to "intelligently judge" the contest, according to several reports. Then-Justice Department lawyer John Roberts, who later became Chief Justice of the Supreme Court, appealed the decision, but the Supreme Court declined to review it.

The case of Wiener v FBI escalated over many years. A settlement with the FBI was reached in 1997 before the case could be heard before the Supreme Court, and most documents except ten were released to Wiener as part of the agreement. According to Wiener, the government paid $204,000 in court costs and attorney fees. The justice department lawyers retained ten documents under the national security proviso of the FOIA. In 2006, the final eight or ten documents of Lennon's file were released. According to Wiener, the ten pages revealed there had been contacts between Lennon and leftist and anti-war groups in London in the early 1970s but that there had been no signs that government officials saw Lennon as a serious threat, and only regarded solicitation of funds for a "left-wing bookshop and reading room in London" but that Lennon did not provide any funds for this purpose. Wiener wrote:

I doubt that Tony Blair's government will launch a military strike on the U.S. in retaliation for the release of these documents ... Today, we can see that the national security claims that the FBI has been making for 25 years were absurd from the beginning.

— Jon Wiener, 2006, in USA Today

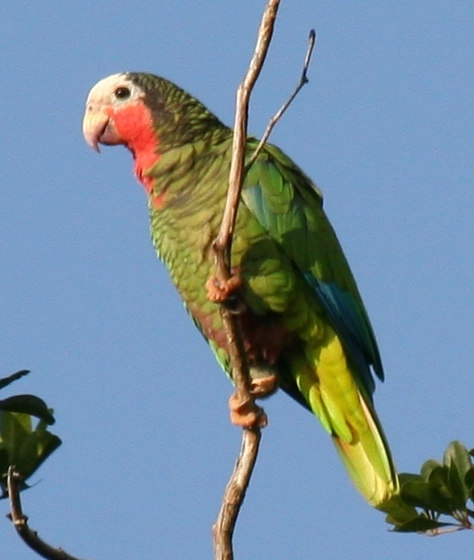
A parrot, similar to this one, was reported to have said "Right on!" whenever discussion got heated.

Wiener expressed amazement that so much of the information had been withheld:

One of the items here is a report from an undercover agent on a meeting of anti-war radicals in the East Village ... The undercover agent reports — this is to J. Edgar Hoover — that at this loft in the East Village, there is a parrot, and whenever the conversation gets heated, the parrot shouts, "Right on!" Now, it's kind of mildly interesting, but why does J. Edgar Hoover need to know this? Why should this be classified "confidential"?

— Jon Wiener, in 2000, in an interview

==== Chronicling the case ====
Wiener wrote about his legal battles in his book, Gimme Some Truth: The John Lennon FBI Files, published by the University of California Press in 2000. The book includes copies of 100 key documents from the Lennon file, including "lengthy reports by confidential informants detailing the daily lives of anti-war activists, memos to the White House, transcripts of TV shows on which Lennon appeared, and a proposal that Lennon be arrested by local police on drug charges." He also wrote about the case and its significance for The Guardian, The Nation, the Los Angeles Times, and The New Republic.

Wiener's work provided the basis for the 2006 documentary The U.S. vs. John Lennon. Wiener served as a historical consultant to the production and appears in the film. He also appears in the documentary LENNONYC, which aired on the PBS show "American Masters" in 2010. He was interviewed about the Lennon FBI Files by Terry Gross on the NPR program "Fresh Air." ACLU attorney Mark Rosenbaum said that the Wiener v FBI case revealed "government paranoia at a pathological level and an attempt to shield executive branch abuse of civil liberties under the rubric of national security."

=== Books ===
Wiener is the author of seven books. In addition to his co-authored 2020 book Set the Night on Fire: L.A. in the Sixties, Wiener also wrote Historians in Trouble: Plagiarism, Fraud and Power in the Ivory Tower. he examined various academic scandals and concluded that media spectacles end careers only when powerful, usually right-leaning external groups demand punishment. He also edited and wrote the introduction to Conspiracy in the Streets: The Extraordinary Trial of the Chicago Seven which included an abridged transcript of the 1968 Chicago Conspiracy trial; in that trial, Bobby Seale, Abbie Hoffman, Jerry Rubin, Dave Dellinger and others faced charges stemming from anti-war demonstrations at the Democratic National Convention, and witnesses included Timothy Leary, Norman Mailer, Arlo Guthrie, and Allen Ginsberg; the book includes an afterword by defendant Tom Hayden and drawings by Jules Feiffer. Wiener's earlier book How We Forgot the Cold War: A Historical Journey across America, based on his visits to Cold War monuments, museums, and memorials, emphasizes popular skepticism about America's victory.

== Reception ==
Reactions by critics to Wiener's writings has been varied. Kirkus Reviews called Set the Night on Fire "a richly detailed portrait of a city that seethed with rebellious energy." The reviewer for the Los Angeles Times described it as "a dense, detailed read" that was “authoritative and impressive.” The Los Angeles Review of Books called it "a monumental history of rebellion and resistance." Some reviewers found problems with the book – Publishers Weekly said it was an "overstuffed and often disjointed account" but declared that "Davis and Wiener write with passion and deep knowledge,” and concluded that the book was “an indispensable portrait of an unexplored chapter in history." In The Guardian, Ben Ehrenreich called it "a vital primer in resistance, a gift to the future from the past", while Sean O'Hagan praised the book's "epic sweep and questioning tone".

Among Wiener's earlier books, The New York Times Book Review wrote that Come Together: John Lennon in His Time "stands out as one of the few books that don't want to deify, dish the dirt about or otherwise exploit the slain former Beatle." The Los Angeles Times criticized Wiener's perspective for being "tunnel-visioned". Gimme Some Truth received positive notices in The Washington Post, The Christian Science Monitor, and The Independent. The magazine Mother Jones commended Wiener for uncovering, via FOIA lawsuits, a set of surveillance documents about Lennon that demonstrate "how willing the government has been at times to spy on, intimidate, and harass those whom it regards as its most effective critics." A review of Historians in Trouble: Plagiarism, Fraud, and Politics in the Ivory Tower faulted Wiener for having a left-leaning bias.

== Selected bibliography ==
- "The Footnote Fetish". Telos (31). Spring 1977. doi:10.3817/0377031172. Archived from the original on June 3, 2018.
- Social Origins of the New South: Alabama, 1865-1885. Baton Rouge: Louisiana State University Press, 1978. ISBN 978-0807108888.
- Come Together: John Lennon in His Time. New York: Random House, 1984. ISBN 978-0252061318.
- "Radical Historians and the Crisis in American History, 1959–1980" (PDF). Journal of American History. 76 (2): 399–434. September 1989. doi:10.2307/1907976.
- Professors, Politics and Pop. London and New York: Verso Books, 1991. ISBN 978-0860916727.
- "Thinking in Public: A Forum". American Literary History. 10 (1): 77–83. Spring 1998. JSTOR 490261.
- "Pop and Avant-Garde: The Case of John and Yoko". Popular Music & Society. 22 (1): 1–18. 1998. doi:10.1080/03007769808591694.
- Gimme Some Truth: The John Lennon FBI Files. Berkeley: University of California Press, 2000. ISBN 978-0520222465.
- "Civil War, Cold War, Civil Rights: The Civil War Centennial in Context, 1960-1965". In The Memory of the Civil War in American Culture. Edited by Alice Fahs and Joan Waugh. Chapel Hill: The University of North Carolina Press, 2004. ISBN 978-0807829073.
- Historians in Trouble: Plagiarism, Fraud, and Politics in the Ivory Tower. New York: The New Press, 2005. ISBN 978-1565848849.
- Conspiracy in the Streets: The Extraordinary Trial of the Chicago Seven. Edited with an introduction by Jon Wiener; afterword by Tom Hayden; drawings by Jules Feiffer. New York: The New Press, 2006. ISBN 978-1565848337.
- "Big Tobacco and the Historians". The Nation. March 15, 2010. Archived from the original on June 21, 2013.
- How We Forgot the Cold War: A Historical Journey across America. Berkeley: University of California Press, 2012. ISBN 978-0520271418.
- I Told You So: Gore Vidal Talks Politics. Interviews with Jon Wiener. New York: OR Books, 2012. ISBN 978-1935928089.
- Set the Night on Fire: L.A. in the Sixties. London: Verso Books, 2020. Co-written with Mike Davis. ISBN 978-1784780227.
