= Radical History Review =

- Cover of January 2020 issue
- Discipline: History
- Language: English

Publication details
- History: 1974-present
- Publisher: Duke University Press (United States)
- Frequency: Triannual

Standard abbreviations
- ISO 4: Radic. Hist. Rev.

Indexing
- ISSN: 0163-6545 (print); 1534-1453 (web)
- OCLC no.: 985576992

Links
- Journal homepage; Online access; Online archive; Project MUSE (2001-2004)

Radical History Review is a scholarly journal published by Duke University Press.

The journal describes its position as "at the point where rigorous historical scholarship and active political engagement converge". In 1979, the journal advertised that it "publishes the best marxist and non-marxist radical scholarship in jargon-free English".

Articles in the journal cover the relationships that "issues of gender, race, sexuality, imperialism, and class" have with histories. In 1999, the editors described "the journal's recent move toward a more overtly political discussion of historical topics".

== Reception ==
The New Criterion describes RHR as "a publication that plainly states it 'rejects conventional notions of scholarly neutrality and 'objectivity,' and approaches history from an engaged, critical, political stance.'"

Jon Wiener in the 1991 book Professors, Politics, and Pop wrote, "The journal has recently distinguished itself by publishing a series of interviews with (several historians) exploring the relationship in their work between historical scholarship and political commitment."
