= Hirokazu Kosaka =

American sculptor (born 1948)

Hirokazu Kosaka (born 1948 in Wakayama) is a Japanese-born American artist, ordained Shingon Buddhist priest, and was the Visual Arts Director at the Japanese American Cultural & Community Center in Little Tokyo, Los Angeles. In 1966 Kosaka moved from Kyoto to Los Angeles where he attended Chouinard Art Institute and received his Bachelor of Fine Arts. While at Chouinard he became influenced by conceptual art, leading to his participation in L.A.’s emerging conceptual art scene during the 1970s. Eventually moving back to Japan, he then traveled to Europe and South America before returning to Los Angeles to live in 1976. In addition to his B.F.A. he also holds a Master of Arts in Theology from Columbia University. His multi-disciplinary practice spans performance art, sculpture, calligraphy, conceptual art and Kyūdō (Japanese Zen archery). In 2004, Kosaka performed “In Between The Heartbeat” at the Indianapolis Museum of Art, using Kyūdō, electric blankets, and copier machines to comment critically on technology.

Kosaka has been the recipient of awards from the National Endowment for the Arts, The Brody Foundation, the J. Paul Getty Trust Fund and the California Arts Council. He was a 2016 USA Andrew W. Mellon Fellow. Notable exhibitions include “On the Verandah: Selected Works from 1969-1974” at Benton Museum of Art, Pacific Standard Time: Los Angeles Art, 1945-1980 at the Getty, and "In the Mood" at Museum of Contemporary Art, Los Angeles.
