= Norman Hines =

American sculptor (1938–2016)

Hines in 1986

Norman "Norm" Patrick Hines (December 27, 1938 – May 1, 2016) was an American sculptor. He is known for his Caelum Moor sculpture in Arlington, Texas, which features five large stone arrangements placed around a park. Hines taught at Pomona College, his alma mater, from 1961 to 2000.
