= John M. White =

American performance artist, sculptor and painter

John M. White (born May 10, 1937) is an American performance artist, sculptor, and painter. He is a significant figure in the development of California performance art in the 1960s.

== Early years ==
Born in San Francisco, California, White entered the art scene later than most at the age of 25. His formal art education started in 1962, at the Patri School of Art Fundamentals—a small private school run by old Bauhaus follower Giacomo Patri.

The Patri School of Art Fundamentals was an intensive program that required the students to focus on one subject for the entire six-day school week, having them analyze, draw, paint, design, and sculpt the subject before moving on to another. This had a great impact on John M White's multidisciplinary approach to his work. His first performances were accompanied by complex diagram-drawings, and such drawings have hung beside his work since (Frank). White has conceived of his installations as three-dimensional drawings, both for their formal reliance on line and for the improvisatory, "quick-sketch" manner of their creation. Whereas some drawings serve as scores or documents for live performances, virtually no drawing has served as a direct study or "floor plan" for an installation. (Frank)

White attended the Otis Art Institute in Los Angeles from 1965 to 1969, where he earned both BFA and MFA by the age of 32. At Otis, he met Joan Hugo, who would later prove to be one of the influential people in his career. Hugo was the school's librarian who also acted as an information resource passing magazines and books on contemporary developments to promising students and encouraging their independent research and discussion (Danieli). At her suggestion in 1969, White took part in the dance concerts of Yvonne Rainer and Glen Lewis at the LA Conservatory of Music and Steve Paxton at Ace Gallery. While participating in Paxton's workshop, White developed what would later become one of his first public performance piece, "Paper and News", performed at University of California, San Diego in 1969. His first public performance piece was Dirt Event, held at Bronson Canyon in 1968.

== 1970–80 ==
After 1970, White's work turned more autobiographical and inclusive, incorporating two- and three-dimensional works into his performance pieces. His work focused more on daily tasks and interpersonal relations. This is partially due to the fact that in 1970, White went to work at a psychiatric hospital, leading group therapy sessions. These sessions became inspiration for his series of drawings called Therapy Notations that use notational form to document the group's interactions like a flow chart. This style is used again in White's series of golf-centered works GolfCourse Notations. These drawings have references from several golf courses around the United States where White has played. They represent conceptual notations from his thought processes during the game. Conditions such as wind, ball trajectories, line of shot, estimating distance, visual distractions are all translated into abstract diagrammatic notations that can be "read." (White)

John M. White received the New Talent Award for the Los Angeles County Museum of Art in 1971 and three years later in 1974 was awarded the first of three National Endowment for the Arts grants (the other two came in 1978 and 1983). In 1974, White also started traveling as a guest lecturer in colleges and universities across the United States.

== 1980s–current ==
In 1984, after the birth of his daughter Rachel, White stopped traveling began teaching Performance Art at University of California, Irvine. Two important pieces came out of his new-found role as parent, Rachel in the Vault (1984) and Second Stories (1986) in which he alludes to his role as harried father. John M White formally retired from performing in 1989, and gave what was to be his final performance at LACE (Los Angeles Contemporary Exhibitions). Three notable exceptions to his retirement were in 1991 at the Los Angeles Music Center (Annotated Lipschitz), 1999 at the Armory Center Museum in Pasadena (Circa) and in 2008 at the Sylvia White Gallery in Ventura, California (John White's Back).

White left the University of California, Irvine in 1994 to teach at a prestigious K-6 school, the Curtis School, in West Los Angeles until 2004. He moved to Ventura, California with his family in 2008 where he has a painting studio and hosts 5x5x5, a performance series for young performance artists featuring 5 artists, 5 performances for 5 minutes each. In 2011, a retrospective of his work will be on view at the Pasadena Armory Center for the Arts. Lifelines: John M. White is curated by Betty Ann Brown, Ph.D.

== Collections ==
White is in the following 'Permanent Collections':

- Solomon R. Guggenheim Museum, New York, NY
- Los Angeles County Museum of Art, Los Angeles, CA
- Smithsonian Archives of American Art, Washington, D.C.
- St. Louis Museum of Contemporary Art, St. Louis, Missouri
- Total Art Museum, Seoul, Korea
- Newport Harbor Art Museum, Newport Beach, CA
- Seattle Art Museum, Seattle, Washington
- Oakland Museum of Art, Oakland, CA
- Los Angeles Institute of Contemporary Art, Los Angeles, CA
- Indianapolis Museum of Modern Art, Indianapolis, Indiana
- City of Santa Monica Art Bank, Santa Monica, CA
- Eli Broad Foundation, Santa Monica, CA
