= Claremont Courier =

Newspaper in Claremont, California, United States

- Type: Weekly newspaper
- Format: Broadsheet
- Founder: E.B. Young
- Publisher: Peter Weinberger
- Editor: Mick Rhodes
- Founded: 1908
- Language: English
- Headquarters: 114 Olive Street; Claremont, CA 91711
- Circulation: 35,600 (as of 2022)
- Website: claremont-courier.com

The Claremont Courier is a weekly community newspaper based in Claremont, California, United States. It is widely regarded as the city's newspaper of record, and is often cited by other news outlets covering the city. It publishes an annual almanac and is known for its aerial videography. Additionally, it is one of the oldest newspapers actively being published in the Greater Los Angeles area.

== History ==
On September 16, 1908, E.B. Young published the first edition of the Claremont Courier. Young operated a print shop in town and was the nephew of the deceased editor of The Daily Iowa Capitol in Iowa. He sold the paper in 1911 to William D. Bell of Phoenix, Arizona.

Bell edited the Courier for a decade. In 1922, he sold it to his son D.T. Bell in order to devote more time to his hardware store. After six months, the paper was purchased by Tobias Larson. C.V. Hickman was a co-owner for 18 months. Larson went on to serve as president of the California Newspaper Publishers Association and expanded the paper's size in 1929. At that time George W. Savage was editor. Larson died in 1936.

The Courier was then passed down to his widow, sister and two sons including Stanley Larson, who published it until 1955. At that time he sold it to Martin J. Weinberger in 1955. In 2007, the paper was transferred to his son, Peter Weinberger. In 2011, M.J. Weinberger died, and three years later was posthumously inducted into the California Newspaper Hall of Fame. In 2018, the Courier was named the top community newspaper in California by the California News Publishers Association. In 2021, the paper received 501(c)(3) nonprofit status.
