= Gary Simmons (artist) =

American painter

- Born: Gary Simmons; April 14, 1964 (age 62); New York City, New York
- Education: BFA 1988 School of Visual Arts, New York; 1990 The California Institute of the Arts, Valencia, California, 1988 Skowhegan
- Known for: Painting, Sculpture, Installation
- Awards: United States Artists 2007

Gary Simmons (born April 14, 1964) is an American artist from New York City. Using icons and stereotypes of American popular culture, he creates works that address personal and collective experiences of race and class. He is best known for his "erasure drawings", in which he draws in white chalk or oil on slate-painted panels, canvases or walls, then smudges them with his hands – a technique that renders their imagery ghostly.

== Work and exhibitions ==
=== Early work ===
Chalkboard Drawing #3 (1992) at the Rubell Museum DC in 2022

Simmons received his BFA from the School of Visual Arts in 1988. He received his MFA from CalArts in 1990 and received both the National Endowment for the Arts Interarts Grant and the Penny McCall Foundation Grant shortly after. Shortly after his graduate studies, Simmons found a studio back home at a former vocational school in Manhattan, New York. His space was empty but for several old-fashioned, wooden, rolling classroom chalkboards, which he began using as canvases in a series of early works about mis-education and conceptions of racial and class identity. Interested in the medium's ambiguous and impermanent nature, he worked with chalk on boards or on walls painted with chalkboard paint almost exclusively in the 1990s. In these works, he often borrowed imagery from antique cartoons that depicted black caricatures. In a wall drawing called Wall of Eyes, commissioned for the 1993 Whitney Biennial, the black surface of board is peppered with bodiless cartoon eyes of different sizes.

=== Erasures series ===
Simmons's most well-known body of work is his Erasures series. His Erasure works are made by first drawing in white chalk on slate-colored panels or oil paint on dark canvases or walls, and then smudging the white pigment with his hands to render a ghostly image. He started Erasure series in the 1990s and continues to do wall paintings in a very similar style.

The Chalkboard medium alludes to teaching and learning. He's repurposed the place where history is taught and uses erasure to redraw the lines of power. He recreates cartoons that depict black caricatures, some clear and some erased into a dreamy blur. These caricatures refer to when the black stereotype in media was a slap-happy, carefree, musical entertainer. The erasing attempts make the images ethereal and almost ghost like. The erasing is a form of mark making in itself. There's a sweeping movement to it that contrasts with the tight lines of the unmarked cartoon. He's bringing up America's dark past to deface it, but he still wants it to be recognized. He has many exhibitions that feature this style. One of his large-scale wall drawings was most recently shown at Metro Pictures Gallery in Midnight Matinee, an exhibition of paintings and drawings which, like the installation Split Personality, depict semi-erased black-on-black drawings of settings from 1970s horror films.

=== Sculpture and installation ===
Ghoster (1997)

Considering himself primarily a sculptor, Simmons early three-dimensional work incorporated powerfully suggestive symbols of oppression including Ku Klux Klan signs, hoods and nooses. One work, entitled Duck, Duck Noose (1992) has chairs in a circle with KKK hoods on each one. In the center of the chairs, a noose hangs from the ceiling. In Klan Gate (1992), two brick pillars surround a large cast iron gate. Atop each pillar stands a stone carved Klan member. In a later work, Big Still (2001), Simmons addresses the state of the poor whites in Appalachia and the South. He recreated a prohibition era moonshine rig that was used by poor rural Appalachian whites. He's commenting on the concept of "white trash," and that their disenfranchised life was similar to the urban black communities. However the sculpture is large and intimidating, representing the virulent racism of the time. In 2014, the Pérez Art Museum Miami commissioned Simmons to create a site specific artwork for the museum's project gallery. The artist produced a large indoor mural measuring 30 feet high by 29 feet wide.

=== Gary Simmons: Public Enemy ===
Gary Simmons: Public Enemy will open on June 10, 2023 at the Museum of Contemporary Art Chicago and is the most in-depth presentation of Simmons's career to date, covering thirty years and approximately seventy works. The exhibit explores the history of racism through various media within American visual culture.

== Collections ==
Simmons' paintings, drawings and sculptures have exhibited throughout the US and internationally at the Museum of Contemporary Art, Chicago; SITE Santa Fe; The Studio Museum in Harlem; San Francisco Museum of Modern Art; Museum Villa Stuck, Munich, and in private collections including the Hirshhorn Museum and Sculpture Garden, Washington, DC; Portland Art Museum, OR; Saint Louis Art Museum, MO; San Francisco Museum of Modern Art; Walker Art Center, Minneapolis; Whitney Museum of American Art; Museum of Modern Art, New York; Pérez Art Museum Miami, Florida.

== Art market ==
Simmons has been represented globally by Hauser & Wirth since 2021. He was previously represented by Metro Pictures Gallery, New York; Simon Lee Gallery, London; Margo Leavin Gallery, Los Angeles; Regen Projects, Los Angeles; and Anthony Meier Fine Arts, San Francisco.
