= Wolfgang Stoerchle =

German-American conceptual artist

Wolfgang Eberhard Stoerchle (born Störchle; January 17, 1944 – March 14, 1976) was a German-American conceptual artist known for influential performance and video works made in Southern California in the 1970s.

== Early life and education ==
Stoerchle was born in Titisee-Neustadt, Germany, during World War II. He moved with his family to Toronto, Ontario, Canada as a teenager in 1959. In 1962, he spent ten months riding through the United States on horseback with his brother, Peter, arriving in Los Angeles and living there in 1963–64.

He went to college at the University of Oklahoma from 1964 to 1968 and began graduate work at the University of California, Santa Barbara, earning an M.F.A. in 1968. He became a naturalized citizen in Oklahoma. During this time he performed in California with fellow artists Miles Varner and Daniel Lentz in a group called California Time Machine.

== Career ==
In 1970, he began teaching in the Post-Studio Art program at California Institute of the Arts, where his fellow instructors included Allan Kaprow and Nam June Paik. His teaching assistant was Jack Goldstein.

In 1972, Stoerchle made a controversial performance at the Pomona College Museum of Art in which he urinated on a rug in the gallery. Backlash to the performance from the college's more socially conservative administration led to a mass resignation of the art faculty.

== Death ==
Stoerchle moved to New Mexico in the fall of 1975. He died six months later after a car accident, age 32. He was survived by his wife, Carol.
