= Tris Vonna-Michell =

British artist (born 1982)

Tris Vonna-Michell (born 1982) is a British artist who performs narratives and constructs installations through the layering of these narratives, photographs and mementos, presented using antiquated technologies and slide projection. Vonna-Michell lives in Southend in the United Kingdom and Stockholm, Sweden. He graduated from the Glasgow School of Art in 2005 and then continued his studies at the Städelschule, Frankfurt am Main. He has since held professorial positions at the Oslo National Academy of the Arts and has been Professor of Fine Art at the Royal Institute of Art.

On 7 May 2014, it was announced that he was one of the four nominees for the Turner Prize.

== Notable solo exhibitions ==
- 2010 No more racing in circles — just pacing within lines of a rectangle, Focal Point Gallery, Southend-on-Sea
- 2009 Halle für Kunst, Lüneburg
- 2009 Finding Chopin: Endnotes, Jeu de Paume Satellite, Paris
- 2009 Tensta Konsthall, Stockholm
- 2009 Auto-Tracking: Ongoing Configurations, Jan Mot, Brussels
- 2009 Tris Vonna-Michell, X-initiative, New York
- 2009 Auto-Tracking-Auto-Tracking, Kunsthalle Zürich, Zürich
- 2009 Studio A: Monumental Detours / Insignificant Fixtures, GAMeC, Bergamo
- 2008 Cabinet Gallery, London
- 2008 Auto-Tracking, Kunsthalle Zürich, Zürich
- 2008 The Trades of Others, T293, Naples
- 2007 Tall Tales and Short Stories, Cubitt, London
- 2007 Puzzlers, Kunstverein Braunschweig Cuboid, Braunschweig
- 2007 Tris Vonna-Michell, Witte de With, Rotterdam
- 2006 Faire un effort, Palais des Beaux-Arts, Brussels
- 2006 Down the Rabbit-Hole, Milliken Gallery, Stockholm

== Prizes and awards ==
- 2008 Statements Art 39 Basel (with T293, Naples), Baloise Art Prize
- 2008 Ars Viva Prize

== Residencies ==
- 2008 IASPIS Residency, Stockholm
- 2009 Focal Point Gallery Residency, Southend-on-Sea

== Curated installations ==
- 2008 Three Minutes, Cubitt, London
