= Andy Hope 1930 =

German painter

Andy Hope 1930 (born Andreas Hofer) is a German artist.

Since 1998, most of his work has been signed "Andy Hope 1930" (although at that time the artist was still named Andreas Hofer).

Hope's subject matter encompasses superheroes, dinosaurs, devils, spaceships and historical villains. He sometimes paints over the top of already painted canvases, sometimes allowing parts of the earlier picture to remain visible.

== Exhibitions ==
Exhibitions include:

- Viva Arte Viva, La Biennale di Venezia, 57th International Art Exhibition, Venice, Italy, 2017
- Andy Hope 1930: When Dinosaurs Become Modernists, Inverleith House, Edinburgh, Scotland, 2012–2013
- Robin Dostoyevsky by Andy Hope 1930, Contemporary Art Centre of Málaga, Spain, 2011
- Andy Hope 1930 at the Freud, Freud Museum, London, 2010
- Andy Hope 1930, Sammlung Goetz, Munich, Germany, 2009
- The Long Tomorrow, MARTa Herford, Herford, Germany, 2007
- Only Gods could survive, Metro Pictures, New York, USA, 2007
- Trans Time, Galerie Guido W. Baudach, Berlin, Germany, 2006
- Welt ohne Ende, Städtische Galerie im Lenbachhaus, Munich, Germany, 2005
