= Little Sun =

Little Sun may refer to:

- Little Sun (organization), a nonprofit organization founded to deliver affordable clean energy in Africa
- Little Sun (album), a 2024 album by Charlie Parr
