= List of exhibitions by Olafur Eliasson =

This is a list of most of the exhibitions of Olafur Eliasson (born in 1967, Copenhagen).

== Solo exhibitions ==
=== 1994 ===
- Stalke Galleri, Copenhagen
- No Days in Winter, No Nights in Summer, Forumgalleriet, Malmö
- Einige erinnern sich, dass sie auf dem Weg waren diese Nacht, Galerie Lukas & Hoffmann, Cologne

=== 1995 ===
- Eine Beschreibung einer Reflexion oder aber eine angenehme Übung zu deren Eigenschaften, neugerriemschneider, Berlin
- Künstlerhaus Stuttgart
- Thoka, Kunstverein in Hamburg
- Tommy Lund Galerie, Odense

=== 1996 ===
- Your Strange Certainty Still Kept, Tanya Bonakdar Gallery, New York
- Your Foresight Endured, Galleria Emi Fontana, Milan
- Tell Me About a Miraculous Invention, Galleri Andreas Brändström, Stockholm; Århus Kunstmuseum
- Malmö Konstmuseum

=== 1997 ===
- The Curious Garden, Kunsthalle Basel
- Your Sun Machine, Marc Foxx Gallery, Los Angeles
- Stalke Galleri, Copenhagen
- Kunsthalle Levyn, Vienna

=== 1998 ===
- Galerie für Zeitgenössische Kunst Leipzig
- Galerie Peter Kilchmann, Zürich
- Yet Untitled, neugerriemschneider, Berlin
- Bonakdar Jancou Gallery, New York
- Kjarvalsstadir, The Reykjavík Art Museum
- Aquarium, Galerie Enja Wonneberger, Kiel
- Fotografier, BildMuseet, Umeå
- Raum für eine Farbe, Kunsthalle Bremen
- Tell me about a miraculous invention, Århus Kunstmuseum

=== 1999 ===
- Your Position Surrounded and Your Surroundings Positioned, Dundee Contemporary Arts
- Your Circumspection Disclosed, Castello di Rivoli, Museo d'Arte Contemporanea, Turin
- Yet Untitled, Kunstverein Wolfsburg
- Olafur Eliasson, Job Koelewijn, De Appel Foundation, Amsterdam
- Riflessi di una certa importanza, Galleria Emi Fontana, Milan
- Your Double Day Diary, Frankfurter Kunstverein, Frankfurt am Main
- Beauty, Marc Foxx Gallery, Los Angeles
- Galleri Ingólfsstraeti, Reykjavík

=== 2000 ===
- Surroundings Surrounded, Neue Galerie am Landesmuseum Joanneum, Graz
- The Only Thing That We Have in Common Is That We Are Different, CCA Center for Contemporary Art, Kitakyushu
- Focus: Olafur Eliasson, Your intuitive surroundings versus your surrounded intuition, The Art Institute of Chicago
- The Curious Garden, Irish Museum of Modern Art, Dublin
- Your Now Is My Surroundings, Bonakdar Jancou Gallery, New York
- Your Orange Afterimage Exposed, Gallery Koyanagi, Tokyo
- Your Blue Afterimage Exposed, Masataka Hayakawa Gallery, Tokyo
- The Aldrich Museum of Contemporary Art, Ridgefield, Connecticut
- IASPIS, Stockholm
- Kunstverein Wolfsburg

=== 2001 ===
- Your Only Real Thing Is Time, The Institute of Contemporary Art, Boston
- The Mediated Motion, Kunsthaus Bregenz
- Surroundings Surrounded, Zentrum für Kunst und Medientechnologie, Karlsruhe
- Projects 73: Olafur Eliasson: Seeing Yourself Sensing, The Museum of Modern Art, New York
- The Structural Evolution Project, Mala Galerija, Ljubljana
- Die Dinge, die du nicht siehst, die du nicht siehst, neugerriemschneider, Berlin
- The Young Land, Barge Project, The Institute of Modern Art, Boston
- Reykjavík Art Festival, Reykjavík
- The Cartographic Series I, Niels Borch Jensen Galerie und Verlag, Berlin

=== 2002 ===
- Chaque matin je me sens différent, chaque soir je me sens le même, Musée d'Art Moderne de la Ville de Paris
- The Cartographic Series I+II, Niels Borch Jensen Galerie und Verlag, Berlin
- Udsigten der aldrig tænker, Galleri Kirke Sonnerup, Såby
- Overgaden, Copenhagen
- i8 Gallery, Reykjavík

=== 2003 ===
- Delight and Other Luminous Movements, Galleria Emi Fontana, Milan
- The Weather Project, Tate Modern, London
- The Blind Pavilion, Danish Pavilion, 50th Venice Biennale
- Funcionamiento silencioso, Palacio de Cristal, Parque del Retiro, Museo Nacional centro de Arte Reina Sofia, Madrid
- Sonne statt Regen, Städtische Galerie im Lenbachhaus und Kunstbau, Munich
- Tanya Bonakdar Gallery, New York City
- Museum Boijmans van Beuningen, Rotterdam

=== 2004 ===
- Ólafur Elíasson: Forgetting, Brändström & Stene, Stockholm
- Ólafur Elíasson: Minding the world, ARoS Århus Kunstmuseum
- Ólafur Elíasson: Your colour memory, Arcadia University Art Gallery, Glenside
- I only see things when they move, Aspen Art Museum
- The Body as Brain. Projekt Sammlung (I), Kunsthaus Zug
- Your Lighthouse. Works with light 1991–2004, Kunstmuseum Wolfsburg
- Ólafur Elíasson: Photographs, The Menil Collection, Houston
- Colour Memory and Other Informal Shadows, Astrup Fearnley Museet for Moderne Kunst, Oslo
- Frost Activity, Hafnarhus, The Reykjavík Art Museum

=== 2005 ===
- Museum Boijmans van Beuningen, Rotterdam
- Malmö Konsthall, Malmö
- Lunds Konsthall, Lund
- Ólafur Elíasson, 101 gallery, Reykjavík
- Ólafur Elíasson: The Colour Spectrum Series, Niels Borch Jensen Galerie und Verlag, Berlin
- Ólafur Elíasson: Meant to be lived in (Today I feel prismatic), Emi Fontana West of Rome, Los Angeles, [USA].
- Ólafur Elíasson: The endless study, Foksal Gallery Foundation, Warsaw

=== 2006 ===
- The Collectivity Project / Fellesprosjektet, Nasjonalmuseet for Kunst, Arkitektur og Design, Oslo
- Your Uncertainty of Colour Matching Experiment (in cooperation with Boris Oicherman), Ikon Gallery, Birmingham
- Your constants are changing, Gallery Koyanagi, Tokyo
- Caminos de Naturaleza, Fundación Telefónica, Madrid
- The endless study, Kiesler Stiftung, Vienna
- Mediating Space / A Laboratory, Aedes am Pfefferberg, Berlin
- Light Lab, Portikus, Frankfurt/ Main
- The Water Tower Concert. Project Sammlung (4), Kunsthaus Zug
- Your engagement sequence, Tanya Bonakdar Gallery, New York
- Remagine Large Version, Kunstmuseum, Bonn
- Your waste of time, neugerriemschneider, Berlin
- Omgivelser, Andersen's Contemporary, Copenhagen

=== 2008 ===
- 50 Moons of Saturn, T2 Torino Triennale, Castello di Rivoli Museum of Contemporary Art, Turin, Italy
- Winter solstice, Equinox, Summer solstice, Jarla Partilager, Stockholm
- Your mobile expectations: BMW H2R project, Pinakothek der Moderne, Munchen
- The Nature of Things, Fundació Joan Miró, Barcelona
- Yellow fog, Verbund Collection, Vienna (permanent exhibition)
- New York City Waterfalls, East River, New York

=== 2007 ===
- The shadow studies. Projekt Sammlung (5), Kunsthaus Zug
- SF MOMA
- PKM Gallery, Korea
- Serpentine Gallery

=== 2009 ===
- Your chance encounter, 21st Century Museum of Contemporary Art, Kanazawa, Japan
- Andersen\\\'s Contemporary, Copenhagen
- i8 Gallery, Reykjavik
- The Body as Brain: Projekt Summlung (6), Kunsthaus Zug
- The parliament of reality: A permanent outdoor installation at Bard College, Bard College, New York
- Mediating experience: Olafur Eliasson\\\'s books, Biblioteca Universitarua di Bologna, Bologna
- Sunspace for Shibukawa, permanent installation, Hara Museum ARC, Shibukawa, Japan
- Is the sky part of landscape, PKM Trinity Gallery, Seoul, Korea

=== 2010 ===
- Utopia – Olafur Eliasson, ARKEN Museum of Modern Art, Ishøj, Denmark
- Multiple shadow house, Tanya Bonakdar Gallery, New York
- Innen Stadt Außen, Martin-Gropius-Bau, as part of the Berliner festspiele, Berlin, Germany
- Kepler was wrong, Galería Elvira González, Madrid
- Olafur Eliasson & Ma Yansong: Feelings are facts, Ullens Center for Contemporary Art, Beijing
- When rainbows appear, site-commission, The Israel Museum, Jerusalem, Israel
- Olafur Eliasson: Notion Motion, Museum Boijmans Van Beuningen, Rotterdam, The Netherlands
- Your black horizon Art Pavilion, with David Adjaye, organized by Thyssen-Bornemisza Art Contemporary, Lopud Island, Croatia
- Olafur Eliasson: Feeling things, Gallery Koyanagi, Tokyo, Japan
- Cars in rivers, National Gallery of Iceland, Reykjavík

=== 2011 ===
- Your emotional future, PinchukArtCentre, Kiev, Ukraine
- Your rainbow panorama, ARoS Aarhus Kunstmuseum, Aarhus, Denmark
- Olafur Eliasson: Your body of work, 17th International Contemporary Art Festival SESC_Videobrasil, SESC São Paulo, Brazil

=== 2012 ===
- Your uncertain shadow, PKM Trinity Gallery, Seoul, Korea
- Little Sun, Tate Modern, London, UK
- Olafur Eliasson, Gerhardsen Gerner, Oslo, Norway
- Volcanos and shelters, Tanya Bonakdar Gallery, New York
- Volcanos and shelters, neugerriemschneider, Berlin, Germany

=== 2014 ===
- Riverbed, Louisiana Museum of Modern Art, Copenhagen, Denmark
- Turner colour experiments, Tate Britain, Linbury Galleries, London, United Kingdom
- Contact, Foundation Louis Vuitton, Paris, France

=== 2015 ===
- Some 40 works from the Boros Collection are shown in the rooms of the Langen Foundation, Museumsinsel Hombroich, Neuss, Germany
- Cirkelbroen in Copenhagen, Denmark
- Time-sensitive activity, Modern Art Museum, Gebre Kristos Desta Center, Addis Ababa University, Addis Ababa, Ethiopia
- We have never been disembodied, Mirrored Gardens, Hualong Agriculture Grand View Garden, Guangzhou, Guangzhou, China
- Werke aus der Sammlung Boros 1994–2015, Langen Foundation, Neuss, Germany
- Verklighetsmaskiner, Moderna Museet, Stockholm, Sweden
- Baroque Baroque, The Winter Palace of Prince Eugene of Savoy, Vienna, Austria

=== 2016 ===
- Nothingness is not nothing at all, Long Museum, Shanghai, China
- Versailles, Palace of Versailles, Paris, France
- The parliament of possibilities, Leeum, Samsung Museum of Art, Seoul, South Korea
- The presence of absence, neugerriemschneider, Berlin, Germany

=== 2017 ===
- Musée d'art contemporain de Montréal, Montréal, Canada
- The listening dimension, Tanya Bonakdar Gallery, New York City, United States of America
- Models for coexistence, PKM Gallery, Seoul, South Korea
- Maison des ombres multiples, Musée d'art contemporain de Montréal, Montreal, Canada
- Recalibrating the senses in Oudenburg, Foundation De 11 Lijnen, Oudenburg, Belgium

=== 2018 ===
- Una mirada a lo que vendrá (A view of things to come), Galería Elvira González, Madrid, Spain

=== 2019 ===
- Tate Modern, London, England

== Group exhibitions ==
=== 1989 ===
- Ventilator Projects, Charlottenborg Konsthall, Copenhagen

=== 1990 ===
- Street Signs, BIZART, Copenhagen

=== 1991 ===
- Overgaden, Copenhagen
- Young Scandinavian Art, Stalke Out of Space, Copenhagen

=== 1992 ===
- Overdrive, 10 Young Nordic Artists, Projektraum, Copenhagen
- Lightworks, Demonstrationslokalet for Kunst, Copenhagen
- Paradise Europe, Poster Project, Copenhagen

=== 1993 ===
- 1700 CET, Stalke Out of Space, Copenhagen
- Black Box, GLOBE Kuratorengruppe, Copenhagen
- Opening Show, Galleri Nicolai Wallner, Copenhagen

=== 1994 ===
- Europa, Ausstellung Münchner Galerien, Munich

=== 1995 ===
- (Landschaft) mit dem Blick der 90er Jahre, Mittelrhein-Museum, Koblenz; Museum Schloss Burgk/Saale; Haus am Waldsee, Berlin
- Kunst & Ökologie, Kunstverein Schloss Plön
- Campo 95, Corderie dell'Arsenale, Venice; Fondazione Sandretto Re Rebaudengo, Turin

=== 1996 ===
- Manifesta 1, The European Biennial of Contemporary Art, Rotterdam, Netherlands
- Nach Weimar, Kunstsammlungen zu Weimar
- Alles was modern ist, Galerie Bärbel Grässlin, Frankfurt am Main
- Tolv, Schaper Sundberg Gallery, Stockholm
- Prospect 96: Photographie in der Gegenwartskunst, Frankfurter Kunstverein and Schirn Kunsthalle Frankfurt
- Views of Icelandic Nature, Kjarvalsstadir, The Reykjavík Art Museum
- Provins-Legende, Museet for Samtidskunst, Roskilde
- Glow: Sublime Projected and Reflected Light, New Langton Arts, San Francisco
- The Scream: Borealis 8, Nordic Fine Arts, 1995–1996, ARKEN Museum for Moderne Kunst, Ishøj
- Summer Show, Tanya Bonakdar Gallery, New York
- Remote Connections, Neue Galerie Graz; Wäino Aaltonen Museum of Art, Turku; Artfocus, Tel Aviv
- Campo 95, Malmö Konstmuseum

=== 1997 ===
- Été 97, Centre Genevois de Gravure Contemporaine, Geneva
- Kunstpreis der Böttcherstrasse in Bremen 1997, Bonner Kunstverein
- Heaven, P.S.1 Contemporary Art Center, New York
- On Life, Beauty, Translations and Other Difficulties: 5th International Istanbul Biennial, Istanbul
- Trade Routes: 2nd Johannesburg Biennale, Johannesburg
- Truce: Echoes of Art in an Age of Endless Conclusions, SITE Santa Fe
- Alikeness, Centre for Contemporary Photography, Fitzroy
- The Louisiana Exhibition: New Art from Denmark and Scania, Louisiana Museum for Moderne Kunst, Humlebæk
- Studija Islandija, Contemporary Art Centre, Vilnius
- 3e Symposium en arts visuels de l'Abitibi-Témiscamingue, Centre d'exposition d'Amos
- Platser, Projects in Public Space, Stockholm
- Schauplatz Museumsquartier: Zur Transformation eines Ortes, Kunsthalle Wien
- Sightings: New Photographic Art, Institute of Contemporary Art, London
- Berlin Biennal, Berlin

=== 1998 ===
- Sharawadgi, Felsenvilla, Baden
- Seamless, Stichting De Appel, Amsterdam
- Something Is Rotten in the State of Denmark, Museum Fridericianum, Kassel
- Do All Oceans Have Walls?, Städtische Galerie im Buntentor, Bremen
- Mai 98, Kunsthalle Köln
- Berlin/Berlin – 1st Berlin Biennale, Akademie der Künste; Postfuhramt; Kunst-Werke Berlin e.V., Institute for Contemporary Art, Berlin
- Auf der Spur, Kunsthalle Zürich
- Waterfall, Sydney Biennial, Sydney
- The very large ice floor, XXIV Bienal de São Paulo, São Paulo
- Cool Places: The 7th Triennial of Contemporary Art, Contemporary Art Center, Vilnius
- The Erotic Sublime (Slave to the Rhythm), Galerie Thaddaeus Ropac, Salzburg
- Transatlántico, Centro Atlántico de Arte Moderno, Las Palmas
- Stalke Anniversary Show, Stalke Galleri, Copenhagen
- Underground, Copenhagen
- Sightings: New Photographic Art, Institute of Contemporary Art, London
- Interferencias, Museo de Arte Contemporaneo, Madrid
- Warming, Project in Harlem, New York
- Round About Ways, Schloss Ujazdowski, Warsaw
- La Ville, le jardin, la mémoire, Villa Medici, Académie de France à Rome
- Light x Eight: The Hanukkah Project, The Jewish Museum, New York
- Edstrandska Stiftelsens Konstnärsstipendiater 1998/The Edstrand Foundation Art Prize 1998, Rooseum, Center for Contemporary Art, Malmö
- New Photography 14: Jeanne Dunning, Ólafur Elíasson, Rachel Harrison, Sam Taylor-Wood, The Museum of Modern Art, New York
- Dad's Art, neugerriemschneider, Berlin
- Nuit blanche, La jeune scène nordique, Musée d'Art Moderne de la Ville de Paris; Reykjavík Municipal Art Museum; Bergen Billedgalleri; Porin Taidemuseo; Göteborgs Konstmuseum
- Kunst & Windenergie zur Weltausstellung, Rathaus der Landeshauptstadt Hanover
- Pakkhus: MOMENTUM Nordic Festival of Contemporary Art, Moss
- Brytningstider, Norrköpings Konstmuseum
- StadtLandschaften, Sabine Kunst Galerie & Edition, Munich

=== 1999 ===
- Carnegie International, 1999/2000, Carnegie Museum of Art, Pittsburgh
- Schöpfung, Karmelitenkirche (Munich); Diözesanmuseum Freising; Heilig-Geist-Kirche, Landshut Skulptur-Biennale 1999 im Münsterland, Münsterland
- Ólafur Elíasson, Vadim Fikin, Marko Peljhan, Eulàlia Valldosera – ... incommensurabilis –, Galerija Skuc, Ljubljana
- Can You Hear Me? 2. Ars Baltica Triennale der Photokunst, Stadtgalerie im Sophienhof, Kiel; Rostock Art Gallery; Contemporary Art Centre, Vilnius; Kunst Haus Dresden; Bergens Kunstforening, Bergen; Galleria Otso, Espoo
- German Open: Gegenwartskunst in Deutschland, Kunstmuseum Wolfsburg
- Saman taivaan alla: Taidetta kaupungissa, 1999–2000: Under samma himmel/ Under the Same Sky, Kiasma, Museum of Contemporary Art, Helsinki
- To the People of the City of the Euro, Frankfurter Kunstverein, Frankfurt am Main
- Photography from the Martin Z. Margulies Collection, The Art Museum at Florida International University, Miami
- The Midnight Sun Show, Lofoten
- Panorama 2000, Centraal Museum, Utrecht
- Sommerens mørke og lyse nætter, Aarhus Kunstbygning
- Overflow, Marianne Boesky & D'Amelio-Terras & Anton Kern Galleries, New York
- Photography: An Expanded View: Recent Acquisitions, Solomon R. Guggenheim Museum, New York
- Arte all'Arte, Arte Continua, Casole d'Elsa, San Gimignano
- Landscape: Outside the Frame, MIT List Visual Art Center, Cambridge
- Drawings, Bonakdar Jancou Gallery, New York
- Children of Berlin, P.S.1 Contemporary Art Center, New York
- dAPERTutto, Venice Biennale, Venice
- Dreams, Fondazione Sandretto Re Rebaudengo, Turin
- Blown Away, 6th International Caribbean Biennial, The Golden Lemon, St. Kitts
- Eingeladen/ Uitgenodigd, ACHK – De Paviljoens, Al Almere
- Next Stop, Kunstfestivalen Lofoten
- Galeria Heinrich Eberhardt, Madrid
- Focused, Galerie Tanit, Munich
- Konstruktionszeichnungen, Kunstwerke, Berlin
- Wånas 1999, Malmö Konstmuseum, Malmö
- Kulturviertel/Sophienhof Kiel; Kunsthalle, Rostock

=== 2000 ===
- Joyce Event, Merce Cunningham Dance Company, Joyce Theater
- Wonderland, The Saint Louis Art Museum, St. Louis
- The Greenhouse Effect, Serpentine Gallery, London
- Times Are Changing: Auf dem Wege! Aus dem 20. Jahrhundert! Eine Auswahl von Werken der Kunsthalle Bremen, 1950–2000, Kunsthalle Bremen
- Raumkörper: Netze und andere Gebilde, Kunsthalle Basel
- Preis der Nationalgalerie für junge Kunst, Nationalgalerie im Hamburger Bahnhof, Museum für Gegenwart, Berlin
- Syndrome, IASPIS Galleriet, Stockholm
- Vision og virkelighed: Forestillinger om det 20. århundrede/ Vision and Reality: Conceptions of the 20th Century, Louisiana Museum for Moderne Kunst, Humlebæk
- Naust, Øygarden, Norway
- Photogravüre, Niels Borch Jensen Galerie und Verlag, Berlin
- ForwArt, BBL, Brussels
- Over the Edges, SMAK Stedelijk Museum voor Actuele Kunst, Ghent
- Wanås 2000, Stiftelsen Wanås Utställningar, Knislinge
- Bleibe, Akademie der Künste, Berlin
- Organising Freedom, Moderna Museet, Stockholm
- North: A New Conceptual Landscape, Aspen Art Museum
- Under the same sky, Kiasma, Helsinki
- Benesse Prize Winners in Naoshima, Naoshima Contemporary Art Museum, Kagawa
- The First Works at Kilchmann, Galerie Peter Kilchmann, Zürich
- On paper, Stalke Galleri, Copenhagen
- International Garden Show, Graz
- Paula Cooper Gallery, New York
- Drawings, Sommer Contemporary Art, Tel Aviv

=== 2001 ===
- Everything Can Be Different, Jean Paul Slusser Gallery, University of Michigan School of Art and Design, Ann Arbor; Art Museum, University of Memphis; Maryland Institute College of Art, Baltimore
- Black Box: Der Schwarzraum in der Kunst, Kunstmuseum Bern
- Aubette: Het verlangen naar een (andere) plaats, Museum Dhondt-Dhaenens, Deurle
- Freestyle: Werke aus der Sammlung Boros, Museum Morsbroich, Leverkusen
- En pleine terre: Eine Wanderung zwischen Landschaft und Kunst, Spiral Jetty und Potsdamer Schrebergärten, Museum für Gegenwartskunst der Öffentlichen Kunstsammlungen Basel und der Emanuel Hoffmann-Stiftung
- Form Follows Fiction/ Forma e finzione nell'arte di oggi, Castello di Rivoli, Museo d'Arte Contemporanea, Turin
- The Waste Land: Wüste und Eis: Ödlandschaften in der Fotografie, Zentrum für zeitgenössische Kunst der Österreichischen Galerie Belvedere, Atelier Augarten, Vienna
- Vision og virkelighed: Forestillinger om det 20. århundrede/ Vision and Reality: Conceptions of the 20th Century, Louisiana Museum for Moderne Kunst, Humlebæk
- Palomino, Galerie für Zeitgenössische Kunst, Leipzig
- Plus vrai que nature, capc Musée d'art contemporain, Bordeaux
- Confronting Nature, Corcoran Gallery of Art, Washington, D.C.
- Neue Welt, Frankfurter Kunstverein, Frankfurt am Main
- Yokohama 2001; International Triennale of Contemporary Art, Yokohama
- En el Cielo, Venice Biennale, Basel 32, Venice
- All-Terrain: An Exploration of Landscape and Place, Contemporary Art Center of Virginia
- New Work, Tanya Bonakdar Gallery, New York
- New Acquisitions from the Dakis Joannou Collection, Deste Foundation, Centre for Contemporary Art, Athens

=== 2002 ===
- Moving Pictures: Contemporary Photography and Video from the Guggenheim Museum Collections, Solomon R. Guggenheim Museum, New York; Guggenheim Bilbao
- Rent-a-Bench, Los Angeles; Trapholt Museum, Kolding
- Topos/Atopos/Anatopos, CCNOA, Brussels
- Ars Lucis et Umbrae, Museum im Palais Kinsky, Vienna
- Void, Rice Gallery G2, Tokyo
- Regarding Landscape, Art Gallery of York University, Toronto; The Koffler Gallery, Toronto; Museum of Contemporary Canadian Art, Toronto; Liane and Danny Taran Gallery, Saidye Bronfman Center for the Arts, Montreal
- Dialoghi Europei d'Arte: Città di Napoli, Castel dell'Ovo and Castel Nuovo, Naples
- El Aire es Azul/The Air Is Blue, Casa Museo Luis Barragán, Mexico City
- From the Cool Light, Niels Borch Jensen Galerie und Verlag, Berlin
- Mirror Mirror, Massachusetts Museum of Contemporary Art, North Adams
- No Return, Städtisches Museum Abteiberg, Mönchengladbach
- Ars Photographica: Fotografie und Künstlerbücher, Neues Museum Weserburg, Bremen
- Claude Monet ... bis zum digitalen Impressionismus, Fondation Beyeler, Riehen
- Oluf Høst i dialog med nutiden, Aarhus Kunstmuseum
- The Hugo Boss Prize 2002, Solomon R. Guggenheim Museum, New York
- Tomorrow's fish 'n chips, Autocenter, Berlin-Friedrichshain
- The Object Sculpture, Henry Moore Institute, Leeds
- Thin Skin: The Fickle Nature of Bubbles, Spheres, and Inflatable Structures AXA Gallery, New York; Scottsdale Museum of Contemporary Art; Gemeentemuseum Helmond; International Museum of Art and Science, McAllen (Texas); Chicago Cultural Center; Edwin A. Ulrich Museum of Art, Wichita State University; Boise Art Museum; International Museum of Art and Science in McAllen; Bedford Gallery, Regional Center for the Arts
- From the Observatory, Paula Cooper Gallery, New York
- Narrando espacios, tiempos, historias, XXVII Bienal de Arte de Pontevedra, Pazo da Cultura de Pontevedra
- Diamanti: Arte, Storia, Scienza, Scuderie del Quirinale, Rome
- Radar: Electronic Integration, Copenhagen and Malmö
- Der reflektierender Korridor. Entwurf zum Stoppen des freien Falls, Zentrum für international Lichtkunst, Unna
- Next, Curated by Hans-Ulrich Obrist, Do it @e-flux.com
- Acquiring Taste, Real Art Ways, Hartford, Connecticut
- Thisplay, Colección Jumex, Mexico

=== 2003 ===
- The new geometry, Galeria Fortes Vilaca, São Paulo
- The Fifth System: Public Art In The Age Of "Post-Planning", The 5th Shenzhen International, Shenzhen Public Art Exhibition
- Telefónica's Contemporary Photography Collection, Telefónica Foundation, Madrid
- In Full View, Andrea Rosen Gallery, New York
- Fra objektiv til objekt, Den Frie Udstillingsbygning, Copenhagen
- Sitings: Installation Art, 1969–2002, Museum of Contemporary Art, Los Angeles
- A Nova Geometria, Galeria Fortes Vilaça, São Paulo
- Art Against Stigma, Statens Museum for Kunst, Copenhagen
- The Origin of Things: Design Award Rotterdam: Imaging Ulysses, Museum Boijmans van Beuningen, Rotterdam
- Hands up, Baby, Hands up, Oldenburger Kunstverein
- Support: Die Neue Galerie als Sammlung, Neue Galerie am Landesmuseum Joanneum, Graz
- The Straight or Crooked Way, Royal College of Art, London
- Edén, Antiguo Colegio de San Ildefonso, Mexico City
- See History 2003: Eine Sammlung wird ausgestellt, Kunsthalle zu Kiel der Christian-Albrechts-Universität, Schleswig-Holsteinischer Kunstverein, Kiel
- No Art = No City! Stadtutopien in der zeitgenössischen Kunst, Städtische Galerie im Buntentor, Bremen
- ARKENS Samling 2003, ARKEN Museum for Moderne Kunst, Ishøj
- Einbildung – Das Wahrnehmen in der Kunst, Kunsthaus Graz
- Spoleto Science Festival, Spoleto
- Tirana Biennale 2, Tirana
- Svjetlina: Djela iz Thyssen-Bornemisza Zaklade za suvremenu umjetnost/ Brightness: Works from the Thyssen-Bornemisza Contemporary Art Foundation, Museum of Modern Art, Dubrovnik
- Imperfect Marriages, Galleria Emi Fontana, Milan
- Frankenstein, Tanya Bonakdar Gallery, New York
- Air, James Cohan Gallery, New York
- Island in Danmark, Galleri Kirke Sonnerup, Såby
- Revisitar Canarias/The Canary Islands Revisited, Galería Elba Benítez, Madrid
- Ars Photographica: Fotografie und Künstlerbücher, Neues Museum Weserburg, Bremen
- Double Exposure: 14 fotografische Diptychen, Galerie und Edition Schellmann, Munich
- Topos/Atopos/Anatopos, CCNOA, Brussels
- Imperfect Innocence: The Debra and Dennis Scholl Collection, Contemporary Museum, Baltimore; Palm Beach Institute of Contemporary Art, Lake Worth
- Manifestation Internationale d'Art de Quebec, Quebec
- Add to it: Louise Lawler (pictures), Ólafur Elíasson & Zumtobel Staff (light), Tobias Rehberger (space), Portikus im Leinwandhaus, Frankfurt am Main
- After the Observatory, Paula Cooper Gallery, New York
- Imagination – Perception in Art, Landesmuseum Joanneum, Kunsthaus Steiermark
- Utopia Station Poster Project, Haus der Kunst Munich
- Warped Space, Wattis Institute for Contemporary Arts, San Francisco
- In full view, Andrea Rosen Gallery, New York
- Nuevos Proyectos/New Projects, NMAC Foundation, Madrid
- Everything can be different, Maryland Institute College of Art, Baltimore
- The Canary Islands Revisited, Galeria elba Bnitez, Madrid

=== 2004 ===
- Los usos de la imagen, Fotografía, film y video, La Colección Jumex, Buenos Aires
- dep,art,ment – the multiple shop of Stockholm, Galleri Charlotte Lund, Stockholm
- The Nature Machine: Contemporary Art, Nature and Technology, Queensland Art Gallery, South Brisbane
- Dicen que finjo o miento. La ficciòn revisada, Central de Arte, Guadalajara
- Modus Operandi, T-B A21, Vienna
- Wow, Henry Art Gallery & Western Bridge, Seattle
- Stadtlicht-Lichtkunst, Wilhelm-Lehmbruck-Museum, Duisburg
- Invisible, Palazzo delle Papesse Centro Arte Contemporanea, Siena
- Bewegliche Teile. Formen des Kinetischen, Kunsthaus Graz am Landesmuseum Joanneum
- Parallele 64 – Art Contemporain Islandais, Espace d'art contemporain Gustave Fayet, Sérignan
- The Encounters in the 21st Century: Polyphony – Emerging Resonances, 21st Century Museum of Modern Art, Kanazawa
- Utopia Station, Mostra d'Oltre Mare, Naples
- Utopia Station, Haus der Kunst, Munich
- ein-leuchten, Museum der Moderne, Salzburg
- Recherche – endeckt! Bildarchive der Unsichtbarkeiten, 6. Internationale Foto-Triennale, Villa Merkel und Bahnwärterhäuschen, Esslingen am Neckar
- monument to now, The Dakis Joannou Collection, Athens
- Reflecting the mirror, Marian Goodman Gallery, New York
- Everything is connected he, he, he, Astrup Fearnley Museum of Modern Art, Oslo
- Why not live for art, Tokyo Opera City Art Gallery, Tokyo
- Atomkrieg, Kunsthaus Dresden
- Landscape ?2, Towner Art Gallery, Eastbourne
- Nouvelles Collections, CentrePasquArt, Bel Bienne
- Story, Myth and dream, Statens Museum for Kunst, Copenhagen
- La relatividad del tiempo y los distintos sistemas de referencia, Oficina para Proyectos de Arte A.C., Guadalajara
- Imágenes en movimiento/ Moving Pictures, Guggenheim Bilbao
- Double Exposure, Brigitte March, Stuttgart
- Werke aus der Sammlung Boros, Museum für Neue Kunst/ZKM, Karlsruhe
- realityREAL: Arbeiten auf Papier, Galerie Gebr. Lehmann, Dresden
- Game of Life, Elías Hjörleifsson and Ólafur Elíasson, Hafnarborg, Hafnarfjardar
- Deste Foundation Centre for Contemporary Art Athens, Greece
- Biennale 2004, Museum of New Art, Detroit

=== 2005 ===
- Out there: Landscape in the New Millennium, Museum of Contemporary Art, Cleveland
- Desenhos: A-Z (Drawings: A-Z), Colecção Madeira Corporate Services, Porta 33, Funchal, Ilha da Madeira, Portugal
- Material Time/Work Time/Life Time, Reykjavík Arts Festival, Iceland
- Making things public – Atmospheres of Democracy, ZKM, Karlsruhe
- Prolog + mission of art, Akademie der Künste, Berlin
- Always a little further, Venice Biennale, Arsenale
- Our Surroundings, Dundee Contemporary Arts, Scotland
- Einstein Spaces, Potsdam, Germany
- Collección De Fotografía Contemporánea de Telefónica, Museo de Arte Contemporánea de Vigo, Spain
- Der Kunst Ihre Räume, Bonner Kunstverein
- Atlantic and Bukarest, Kunstmuseum Basel
- Remagine. Œuvres du Fonds National d'Art Contemporain, Musée d'Art Contemporain, Lyon
- Emergencias, Museo de Arte Contemporénneo de Castilla y Léon, Léon
- Dialog Skulptur, Kunstforum Seelingstadt
- Das verlorene Paradies, Die Landschaft in der Zeitgenössichen Photographie, Stiftung Opelvillen, Rüsselsheim
- Wolkenbilder, Aargauer Kunsthaus, Aarau
- Ecstasy: In and About Altered States, Museum of Contemporary Art, Los Angeles
- First Acquisitions. A selection of works from the Foundation for Contemporary Art Victor Pinchuk, Venice
- Die Ordnung der Natur, Museum Moderner Kunst, Passau
- Send min ven i skole, Hele verden i skole 2005, Københavns Bymuseum, Copenhagen, Denmark
- Send my Friend to School, Global Campaign for Education, South Bank, London, Great Britain

=== 2006 ===
- Out of Place, The New Art Gallery Walsall, West Midlands
- No. 14 Light Play, Z33, Hasselt
- The François Pinault Collection, a Post-Pop Selection, Palazzo Grassi, Venice
- Gletscherdämmerung, ERES-Stiftung, Munich
- Der Blaue Reiter im 21. Jahrhundert, Lenbachhaus, Munich
- Open House / Casa Aberta, INHOTIM centro de arte contemporânea, Minas Gerais, Brazil
- FASTER! BIGGER! BETTER!, ZKM Zentrum für Kunst und Medien Technologie, Karlsruhe
- Exhibition of Contemporary Art "New Space", Pinchuk Art Centre, Kiev
- Eye on Europe: Prints, Books & Multiples / 1960 to Now, The Museum of Modern Art, New York
- After Cage – 24 Collections in Motion, Aachen – Liége – Hasselt – Maastricht
- Convertible City, German Pavillon, 10th International Architecture Exhibition, Venice
- Not All Is Visible / Works from the Astrup Fearnley Collection, Astrup Fearnley Museum of Modern Art, Oslo
- Surprise, Surprise, Institute of Contemporary Arts, London
- Visuell – Blind Date. Neuerwerbungen der Sammlung Deutsche Bank, Galerie Kunstforum, Altes Haus, Seligenstadt
- Fantastic Politics, The National Museum of Contemporary Art, Oslo
- Testigos / Witnesses, NMAC Foundation, Madrid
- Anstoss Berlin – Kunst macht Welt, Haus am Waldsee, Berlin
- Rauminszenierungen 2006, Gartenlandschaft OstWestfalenLippe, Bielefeld
- The Expanded Eye, Kunsthaus Zürich, Zurich
- Landscape: Recent Acquisitions, The Museum of Modern Art, New York
- Bühne des Lebens – Rhetorik des Gefühls, Städtische Galerie im Lenbachhaus und Kunstbau München, Munich
- Nature Attitudes, Thyssen-Bornemisza Art Contemporary, Vienna
- Intensive Science, La Maison Rouge, Paris
- Peace Tower, Whitney Museum of American Art, New York
- Constructing New Berlin, Phoenix Art Museum, Arizona
- The Garden Party, Deitch Projects, New York
- SHIFTscale, KUMU / The Art Museum of Estonia, Tallinn
- Galleri MGM, Oslo
- Bjerge I Dansk Kunst – fra Willumsen til Parfyme, Herning Kunstmuseum, Herning
- Botanical Garden, Jardín Botánico Culiacán, Mexico
- Between Art and Life: The Contemporary Painting and Sculpture Collection, SFMOMA San Francisco Museum of Modern Art
- Where are we going? Palazzo Grassi, Venice
- The clouds between us – and other works from the Moderna Museet's collection, Moderna Museet, Stockholm
- Premio Biella per l'incisione: Arte nell’eta dell’ansia, Museo del Territorio Biellese, Biella
- Das erste Blick, Sammlung GAG, Weimar
- Dialog Skulptur, Kunstverein Ludwigshafen

=== 2007 ===
- Your House, Walker Art Center, Minneapolis, Minnesota
- Migratory Esthetics, Zuiderzeemuseum, Enkhuizen
