= Emi Fontana =

Amelia "Emi" Fontana
- Born: 1961 (age 64–65); Milan, Italy

Amelia "Emi" Fontana (born 1961 in Milan) is a cultural producer, art curator and writer based in Los Angeles.

Fontana studied art history at the University La Sapienza in Rome, with a focus on the Venetian Renaissance. She came of age in the late seventies when Italy was experiencing a renaissance of creativity and was considered a laboratory of new ideas and talents. During this time Fontana was immersed in circles of artists, musicians and writers. She was especially close to the group of writers and cartoonists involved with the publication of several independent magazines, including Il Male, Cannibale, and Frigidaire – as well as "off theater" avant-garde experiences like the circle of the Beat 72 . In these early years Fontana met the well known cultural attaché for the city of Rome, Renato Nicolini. His ideas of bringing culture in to the streets trespassing boundaries of high and low that culminated with the Estate Romana (Roman Summer), became influential for her later activity as cultural producer.

== Early career ==
In the late 1980s, after few years working in advertising, Fontana became increasingly active and involved in contemporary art as an independent curator for galleries and public institutions. With Laura Ruggeri and Gianni Romano she initiated the first archive of women artists working in Italy, which is now housed at DOCVA (Documentation Centre for Visual Arts) in Milan. In 1991 she organized "An English View" at the British Academy in Rome, the first show in Italy of YBA (Young British Art).

== Emi Fontana Gallery, Milan ==
In 1992, Fontana opened the Emi Fontana Gallery in Milan, where she worked with artists such as Adrian Piper, Alessandra Spranzi, Arpiani & Pagliarini, Cosima von Bonin, Diana Thater, Gillian Wearing, John Waters, Ketty La Rocca, Liam Gillick, Liliana Moro, Lovett & Codagnone, Luca Buvoli, Luca Vitone, Mark Dion, Michael Smith, Mike Kelley, Monica Bonvicini, Olafur Eliasson, Renée Green, Rirkrit Tiravanija and Sam Durant. The gallery officially closed in 2009.

== Curatorial activities and productions ==
In 2002 Fontana organized a small exhibition for conceptual artist Ketty La Rocca (Italian, 1938-1976) at the Italian Cultural Institute of Los Angeles. Three years later in 2005 Fontana initiated a series of nomadic art projects under the name "West of Rome". The organization focused on finding alternative strategies of exhibition for contemporary art. The first project was Olafur Eliasson's "Meant to be lived in (Today I’m feeling prismatic)", at the Jamie Residence, Pasadena, CA. In 2006 Fontana brought the work of Italian artist Monica Bonvicini to a vacant, store front in Pasadena for "Not For You". 2007 Fontana curated "relay", which was a collaborative work of T. Kelly Mason and Diana Thater, held in a former bridal salon in Westwood, CA. Also in Westwood in 2007, Fontana presented works of Liliana Moro featuring a group of cast-bronze sculptures of attacking dogs, and framed embroidered depictions of domestic cats at the Italian Cultural Institute.

== West of Rome Public Art ==
By 2008 Fontana took steps towards setting up a non-profit art initiative with support of the Pasadena Arts Council until eventually gaining status as a 501(c)(3) non-profit organization and becoming "West of Rome Public Art". In 2008 Fontana curated the group show “Women in the City”, where works by Cindy Sherman, Barbara Kruger, Jenny Holzer and Louise Lawler were disseminated in more than 300 locations across greater Los Angeles. as best public art project of the year by American's for the arts. In 2009 she curated and produced with Mike Kelley, and Michael Smith "A Voyage of Growth and Discovery” a multichannel video and sculptural installation by Kelley and Smith. 2010 a later incarnation of "Women in the City" would include artists Marnie Weber and Jennifer Bolande, In 2011, Fontana organised "Trespass Parade" as part of Getty's "Pacific Standard Time" with Rirkrit Tiravanija and Arto Lindsay, a project that involved more than 200 artists and over 2000 participants, who took over the streets of downtown Los Angeles in street theatre and performance.

== Recent projects ==
More recently, Fontana curated a series of new performances for the J. Paul Getty's "Pacific Standard Time Performance Festival" and West of Rome, with Vaginal Davis and Andrea Fraser; Andrea Fraser’s "Men on the Line," has been since then presented in prominent art institutions, from MoMA to the Ludwig Museum in Cologne, as well as becoming the object of major academic discussions on the issue of performance, feminism and so called post-feminism. Also the work of artist Suzanne Lacy "Three Weeks in January" curated by Emi Fontana in collaboration with John Tain as part of the J. Paul Getty's "Pacific Standard Time Performance Festival

In May 2013 Emi Fontana and Andrea Lissoni curated the exhibition, Mike Kelley, "Eternity is a Long Time". for the Hangar Bicocca and Pirelli Foundation in Milan. Also in the summer of 2013 Fontana curated the show of another Los Angeles based artist. Stanya Kahn's, "Downer (but your ass looks huge from down here)" at Pigna Project Space in Rome, Italy from May 25 -June 25, 2013.

== Writing ==
Fontana occasionally publishes her writings on Flash Art International, Rolling Stone (Italian edition) and Mousse.

- Ketty La Rocca, You – Works and Writings 1964-1976, Revolver Publishing, 2018
- Liliana Moro, UNDERDOG, La Galleria Nazionale, 2018
- Io, Luca Vitone, Padiglione d’Arte Contemporanea, 2017
- Chris Burden, Flash Art, 2017
- Photographer of a Revolution, The Girl with the Camera: The Photography of Leni Sinclair, Detroit Research, On Dance, Volume Two, 2016
- Mike Kelley (1954-2012): Ten Tributes, Frieze, April 2012
- Mike Kelley: Memory Ware, Wood Grain, Carpet, JRP Ringier / Galleria Emi Fontana, 2005
- Mark Dion, Archaeology, Black Dog Publishing, 1999

== Yoga ==
Fontana is an active Yoga teacher in Los Angeles and Pasadena, California. She began her Yoga training in 2010 shortly after moving to Los Angeles. Over the years Fontana has studied and trained with Pandit Rajmani Tigunait, Erich Shiffmann, Jeanne Heileman, Leslie Kaminoff, Larry Payne, Maty Ezraty, Rod Stryker, Paul Cabanis, Kofi Busia, Manuso Manos, and Carrie Owerko.
