= Olafur Eliasson =

Danish-Icelandic artist (born 1967)

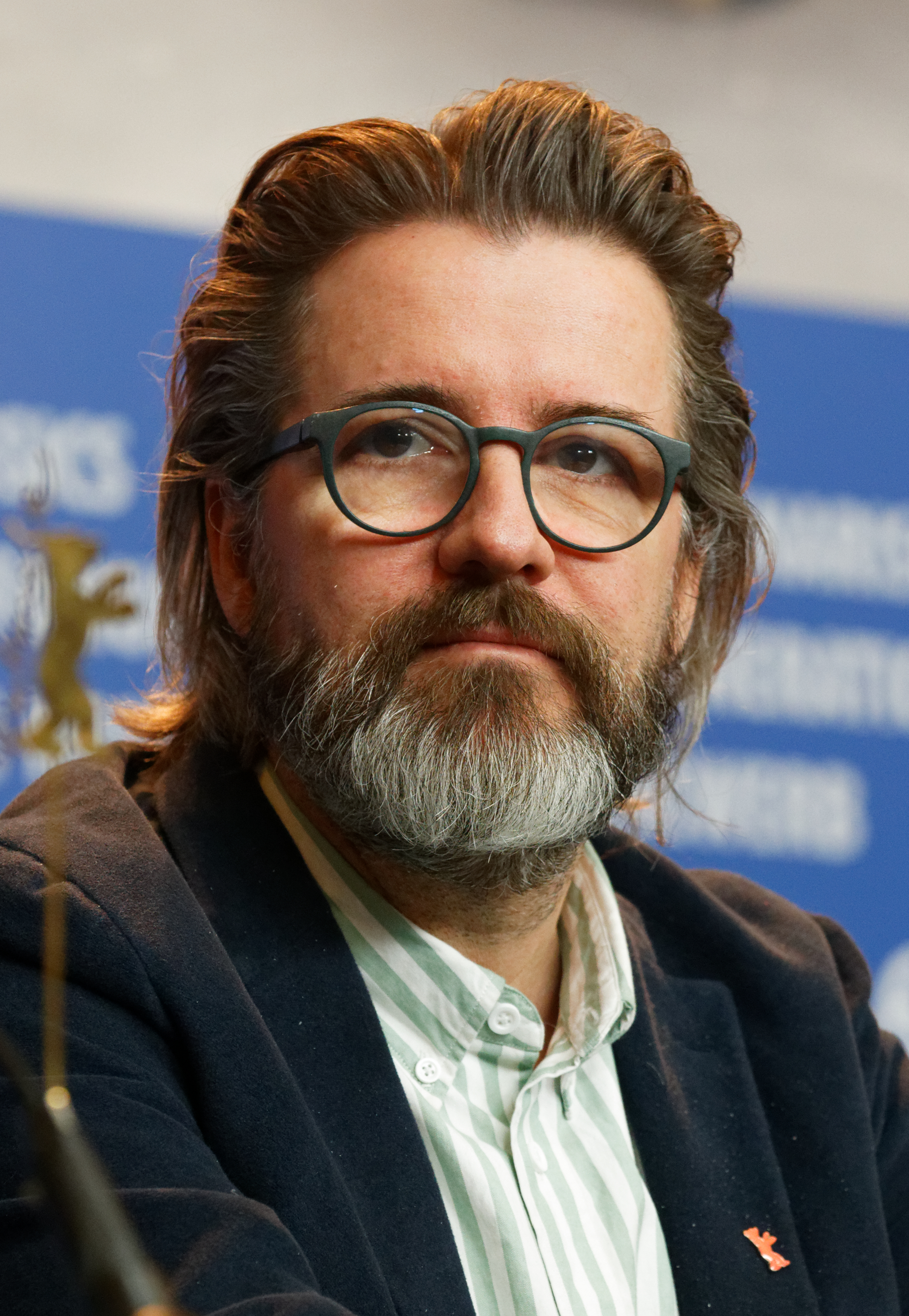
- Olafur in 2017
- Born: Ólafur Elíasson; 5 February 1967 (age 59); Copenhagen, Denmark
- Known for: Installation art
- Website: olafureliasson.net

Olafur Eliasson (Icelandic: Ólafur Elíasson; born 5 February 1967) is an Icelandic–Danish artist known for sculptured and large-scaled installation art employing elemental materials such as light, water, and air temperature to enhance the viewer's experience.

In 1995, Olafur established Studio Olafur Eliasson in Berlin, a laboratory for spatial research. In 2014, Olafur and his long-time collaborator – German architect Sebastian Behmann – founded Studio Other Spaces, an office for architecture and art.

Olafur represented Denmark at the 50th Venice Biennale in 2003 and later that year installed The Weather Project, which has been described as "a milestone in contemporary art", in the Turbine Hall of Tate Modern, London.

Olafur has engaged in a number of public projects, including the intervention Green river, carried out in various cities between 1998 and 2001; the Serpentine Gallery Pavilion 2007, London, a temporary pavilion designed with the Norwegian architect Kjetil Trædal Thorsen; and the New York City Waterfalls, commissioned by Public Art Fund in 2008. Olafur also created the Breakthrough Prize trophy. Like much of his work, the sculpture explores the common ground between art and science. It is molded into the shape of a toroid, recalling natural forms found from black holes and galaxies to seashells and coils of DNA.

Olafur was a professor at the Berlin University of the Arts from 2009 to 2014 and has been an adjunct professor at the Alle School of Fine Arts and Design in Addis Ababa since 2014. His studio is based in Berlin, Germany.

== Life and career ==
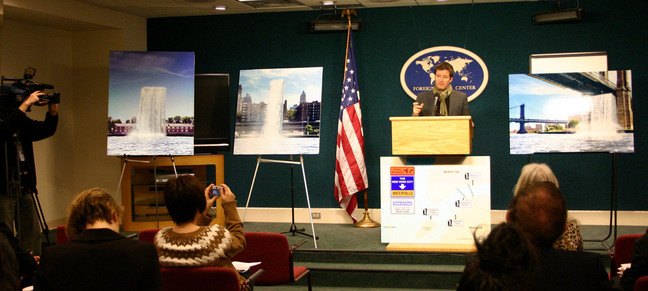
Olafur speaking about his exhibition The New York City Waterfalls

=== Early life and education ===
Olafur Eliasson was born in Copenhagen in 1967 to Elías Hjörleifsson and Ingibjörg Ólafsdóttir. His parents had emigrated to Copenhagen from Iceland in 1966, his father to find work as a cook and his mother as a seamstress. He was 8 when his parents separated. He lived with his mother and his stepfather, a stockbroker. His father, then an artist, moved back to Iceland, where their family spent summers and holidays.

At 15, Olafur had his first solo show where he exhibited landscape drawings and gouaches at a small alternative gallery in Denmark. However, Olafur considered his "break-dancing" during the mid-1980s to be his first artworks. With two school friends, he formed a group that called themselves the Harlem Gun Crew and with whom he performed at clubs and dance halls for four years, eventually winning the Scandinavian championship.

Olafur studied at the Royal Danish Academy of Fine Arts from 1989 to 1995. In 1990, when he was awarded a travel budget by the Royal Danish Academy, Olafur went to New York where he started working as a studio assistant for artist Christian Eckart in Williamsburg, Brooklyn, and reading texts on phenomenology and Gestalt psychology.

=== Artistic career ===
Olafur received his degree from the academy in 1995, after having moved in 1993 to Cologne for a year, and then to Berlin, where he has since maintained a studio. First located in a three-story former train depot right next door to the Hamburger Bahnhof, the studio moved to a former brewery in Prenzlauer Berg in 2008.

In 1996, Olafur started working with Einar Thorsteinn, an architect and geometry expert 25 years his senior as well as a former friend of Buckminster Fuller. The first piece they created called 8900054, was a stainless-steel dome 30 feet (9.1 m) wide and 7 feet (2.1 m) high, designed to be seen as if it were growing from the beneath the ground. Thorsteinn's knowledge of geometry and space has been integrated into Olafur's artistic production, often seen in his geometric lamp works as well as his pavilions, tunnels and camera obscura projects.

For many projects, the artist works collaboratively with specialists in various fields, among them the architects Thorsteinn and Sebastian Behmann (both of whom have been frequent collaborators, Behmann working on the Kirk Kapital headquarters on Vejle Fjord in Denmark, completed in 2018), author Svend Åge Madsen (The Blind Pavilion), landscape architect Gunther Vogt (The Mediated Motion), architecture theorist Cedric Price (Chaque matin je me sens différent, chaque soir je me sens le même), and architect Kjetil Thorsen (Serpentine Gallery Pavilion, 2007). Studio Olafur Eliasson, which the artist founded as a "laboratory for spatial research", employs a team of architects, engineers, craftsmen, and assistants (some 30 members as of 2008) who work together to conceive and construct artworks such as installations and sculptures, as well as large-scale projects and commissions. Olafur is influenced by Bruce Nauman, as well as James Turrell and Robert Irwin.

As professor at the Berlin University of the Arts, Olafur Eliasson founded the Institute for Spatial Experiments (Institut für Raumexperimente, IfREX), which opened within his studio building in April 2009. Huffington Post named Olafur one of "18 green artists who are making climate change and conservation a priority."

== Selected works and projects ==
=== Beauty (1993) ===
Nadine Wojcik, after attending the In real life exhibition in 2019, dubbed Beauty (1993) a "simple yet powerful water installation that evokes a rainbow via spotlights". Anna Souter called the work "a reminder of the intensely fragile beauty of the natural world and its elements. ... it's simply and superbly beautiful".

=== Ventilator pieces ===
Early works by Olafur consist of oscillating electric fans hanging from the ceiling. Ventilator (1997) swings back and forth and around, rotating on its axis. Quadrible light ventilator mobile (2002–2007) is a rotating electrically powered mobile comprising a searchlight and four fans blowing air around the exhibition room and scanning it with the light cone. In a 2008 review of the Take Your Time retrospective (at the Museum of Modern Art), Peter Schjeldahl dubbed Ventilator "a witty finesse of the MOMA atrium's space-splurging grandiosity".

=== The Weather Project ===
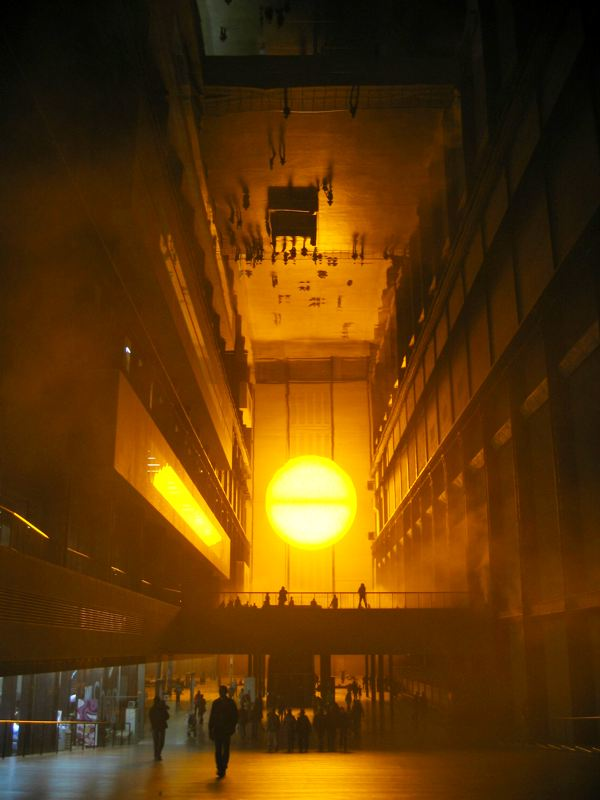
The weather project at Tate modern

The Weather Project was installed at the London's Tate Modern in 2003 as part of the popular Unilever series. The installation filled the open space of the gallery's Turbine Hall.

Olafur used humidifiers to create a fine mist in the air via a mixture of sugar and water, as well as a semicircular disc (reflected by the ceiling mirror to appear circular) made up of hundreds of monochromatic lamps which radiated yellow light. The ceiling of the hall was covered with a huge mirror, in which visitors could see themselves as tiny black shadows against a mass of orange light symbolizing the sun. Many visitors responded to this exhibition by lying on their backs and waving their hands and legs. Art critic Brian O'Doherty described this as viewers "intoxicated with their own narcissism as they ponder themselves elevated into the sky."

The Weather Project was highly successful. Open for six months, the work reportedly attracted two million visitors, many of whom were repeat visitors. O'Doherty was positive about the piece when talking to Frieze magazine in 2003, saying that it was "the first time I've seen the enormously dismal space—like a coffin for a giant—socialized in an effective way." The Telegraph's Richard Dorment praised its "beauty and power". It remains his most famous work and ranked 11th in a poll by The Guardian of the best art since 2000, with Jonathan Jones describing Olafur as "one of the century's most significant artists.". The Weather Project attempted to give viewers the impression that they were near the sun inside the clouds, but in actuality, a large semicircle was suspended from a mirror ceiling, giving the impression that the reflection was a full circle. The mirrors on the ceiling produced the image of the space below that was visible. The audience completed the effect by frequently being observed lying down on their backs, staring at the ceiling, and making various motions to observe their reflections. This was done by both adults and children.

=== Light installations ===
Your Oceanic Feeling (2015) at the Hirshhorn Museum and Sculpture Garden in 2022

Olafur has been developing various experiments with atmospheric density in exhibition spaces. In Room For One Colour (1998), a corridor lit by low pressure sodium lamps, the participants find themselves in a room filled with monochromatic yellow light which affects their perception of colours. Another installation, 360 degrees Room For All Colours (2002), is a round light-sculpture where participants lose their sense of space and perspective, and experience being subsumed by an intense light. Olafur's later installation Din blinde passager (Your blind passenger) (2010), commissioned by the Arken Museum of Modern Art, is a 90-metre-long tunnel. Entering the tunnel, the visitor is surrounded by dense fog. With visibility at just 1.5 metres, museumgoers have to use senses other than sight to orient themselves in relation to their surroundings. After attending the 2019 In real life exhibition, Souter deemed Your blind passenger one of Olafur's finest works, reporting that she felt "alone in the universe. ... I thought I could see my own irises, flashing as a ring of blue in front of me, and I could hear my own heartbeat in my ears." For Feelings are facts, the first time Olafur has worked with Chinese architect Yansong Ma as well as his first exhibition in China, Olafur introduces condensed banks of artificially produced fog into the gallery of Ullens Center for Contemporary Art, Beijing. Hundreds of fluorescent lights are installed in the ceiling as a grid of red, green, and blue zones.

=== Green river ===
In 1998, Olafur discovered that uranin, a readily available nontoxic powder used to trace leaks in plumbing systems, could dye entire rivers a sickly fluorescent green. Olafur conducted a test run in the Spree River during the 1998 Berlin Biennale, scattering a handful of powder from a bridge near Museum Island. He began introducing the environmentally safe dye to rivers in Moss, Norway (1998), Bremen (1998), Los Angeles (1999), Stockholm (2000) and Tokyo (2001) — always without advance warning. He first achieved international prominence with Green river, which initially made Stockholm pedestrians concerned that the city's water had been tainted.

=== Riverbed ===
At Denmark's Louisiana Museum of Modern Art in 2014–2015, Olafur created a riverbed installation. He compiled natural rocks, dirt, and water to transform the gallery space into a landscape and titled the piece, "Riverbed". Olafur captures physical phenomena in a way that appears both real and slightly artificial, while contained in a constructed space that invites viewers to participate. Riverbed becomes an immersive experience, using all five senses, in which the individuals can either follow or curiously step away from. Freedom exists in both of these actions, allowing the participant to discover a paradox or enter a void, questioning their true freedom and will happening within a designed system.

In a 2014 review of the exhibition, Svava Riesto and Henriette Steiner said that Olafur "cuts us off from the surroundings and imports a different and rough beauty"; they described the view of the stony landscape as "meticulously framed". However, they also speculated that Olafur aimed to make viewers see Louisiana differently and failed, creating a work that differs little from Louisiana: "The question about ... how it really made us see things in new ways is still unanswered."

=== Iceland photographs ===
Olafur frequently presents grids of various color photographs, all taken in Iceland. Each group of images focuses on a single subject: volcanoes, hot springs and huts isolated in the wilderness. In his very first series he attempted to shoot all of Iceland's bridges. A later series from 1996 documented the aftermath of a volcanic eruption under the Vatnajökull. Often these photographs are shot from the air, in a small rented plane traditionally used by mapmakers. Arranged in a grid, the photographs recall the repetitive images of the German photographers Bernd and Hilla Becher.

=== Your black horizon ===
This project, a light installation commissioned for the Venice Biennale by Thyssen-Bornemisza Art Contemporary in collaboration with British architect David Adjaye, was shown from 1 August to 31 October 2005 on the island of San Lazzaro in the lagoon near Venice, Italy. A temporary pavilion was constructed on the grounds of the monastery to house the exhibit, consisting of a square room painted black with one source of illumination–a thin, continuous line of light set into all four walls of the room at the viewers eye-level, serving as a horizontal division between above and below. In 2007, the pavilion was relocated to the island of Lopud, Croatia near the city of Dubrovnik. Since then, it has on several occasions reopened to the public.

=== Your mobile expectations: BMW H2R project ===
Olafur was commissioned by BMW in 2007 to create the sixteenth art car for the BMW Art Car Project. Based on the hydrogen-powered BMW H2R concept vehicle, Olafur and his team removed the automobile's alloy body and instead replaced it with a new interlocking framework of reflective steel bars and mesh. Layers of ice were created by spraying approximately 530 gallons of water during a period of several days upon the structure. On display, the frozen sculpture is glowing from within. Your mobile expectations: BMW H2R project was on special display in a temperature controlled room at the San Francisco Museum of Modern Art from 2007 to 2008 and at the Pinakothek der Moderne, Munich, in 2008.

=== The New York City Waterfalls ===
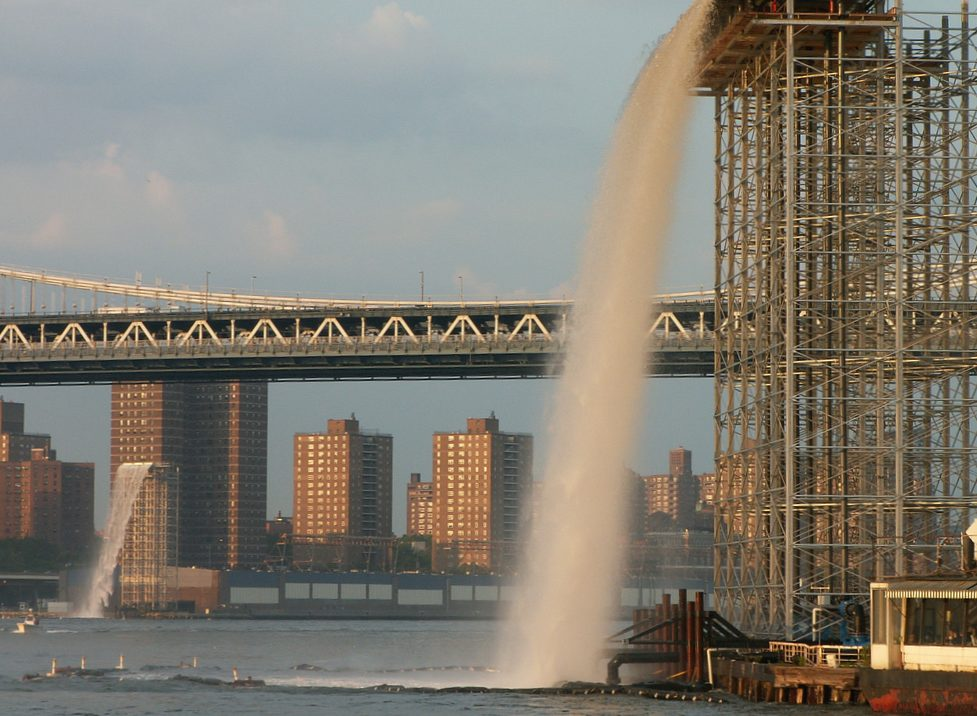
Waterfall under the Brooklyn Bridge. The bridge in the background is the Manhattan Bridge.

Olafur was commissioned by The Public Art Fund to create four man-made waterfalls, called The New York City Waterfalls, ranging in a height from 90 to 120 ft., in New York Harbor. The installation ran from 26 June through 13 October 2008. At $15.5 million, it was the most expensive public arts project since Christo and Jeanne-Claude's installation of The Gates in Central Park.

=== The Parliament of Reality ===
Dedicated on 15 May 2009, this permanent sculpture stands at Bard College, Annandale-on-Hudson, New York. The installation is based on the original Icelandic parliament, Althingi, one of the world's earliest democratic forums. The artist envisions the project as a place where students and visitors can gather to relax, discuss ideas, or have an argument. The parliament of reality emphasizes that negotiation should be the core of any educational scheme. The man-made island is surrounded by a 30-foot circular lake, 24 trees, and wild grasses. The 100-foot-diameter (30 m) island is composed of a cut-bluestone, compass-like floor pattern (based upon meridian lines and navigational charts), on top of which 30 river-washed boulders create an outdoor seating area for students and the public to gather. The island is reached by a 20-foot-long stainless steel lattice-canopied bridge, creating the effect that visitors are entering a stage or outdoor forum. Frogs gather in this wiry mesh at night, creating an enjoyable symphony.

=== Colour experiment paintings (2009–) ===
For his ongoing series of Colour experiment paintings – which began in 2009 – Olafur started analyzing pigments, paint production and application of colour in order to mix paint in the exact colour for each nanometre of the visible light spectrum. This body of work features color wheels that are created in a variety of spectrums. He also explores the work of Caspar David Friedrich. In 2014, Olafur analyzed seven paintings by J. M. W. Turner to create Turner colour experiments, which isolate and record Turner's use of light and colour.

In April 2023, his artwork Colour experiment no. 114 was used as the artwork for the Peter Gabriel song "i/o", from the forthcoming album of the same name.

=== Harpa ===
Olafur designed the facade of Harpa, Reykjavík's new concert hall and conference centre which was completed in 2011. In close collaboration with his studio team and Henning Larsen Architects, the designers of the building, Olafur has designed a unique facade consisting of large quasi bricks, a stackable twelve sided module in steel and glass. The facade will reflect the city life and the different light composed by the movements of the sun and varying weather. During the night the glass bricks are lit up by different colored LED lights. The building was opened on 13 May 2011, and garnered acclaim.

=== Your rainbow panorama ===
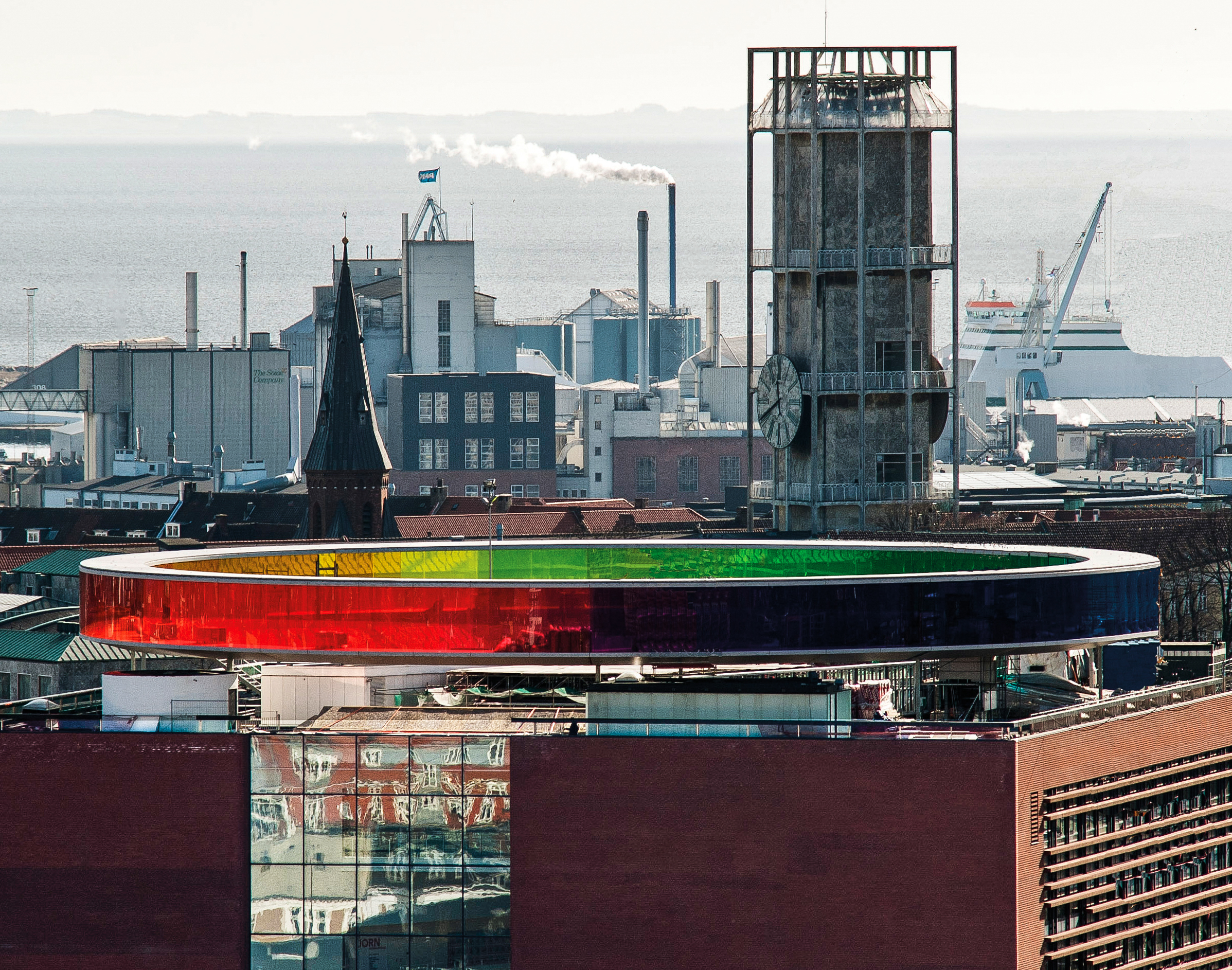
Your rainbow panorama at ARoS Art Museum in Aarhus, Denmark.

Olafur's artwork Your rainbow panorama consists of a circular, 150 metres (490 ft) long and 3 metres (9.8 ft) wide corridor made of glass in every color of the spectrum. It has a diameter of 52 metres (171 ft) and is mounted on 3.5 metres (11 ft) high columns on top of the roof of the ARoS Aarhus Kunstmuseum in Aarhus. It opened in May 2011. Visitors can walk through the corridor and have a panoramic view of the city. Construction cost 60 million Danish kroner and was funded by the Realdania foundation.

Olafur's idea was chosen in 2007 among five other proposals in a bidding process by a panel of judges. At night the artwork is lit from the inside by spotlights in the floor.

=== Moon ===
In November 2013, at the Falling Walls Conference, Olafur presented with Ai Weiwei their collaboration Moon, an open digital platform that allows users to draw on a replica of the moon via their web browser. Eliasson presented the platform as "a sphere on which you can make a mark. Not just to make a mark, but make a mark that matters to you. Make your wish, make your dream. Do something." Accessible to anyone, it attracted over 35,000 participants within the first six weeks.

=== Contact ===
From December 17, 2014, to February 23, 2015, Fondation Louis Vuitton, Paris. The artworks appear as a sequence of events along a journey. Moving through passageways and expansive installations, visitors become part of a choreography of darkness, light, geometry, and reflections. Along the way, optical devices, models, and a meteorite reflect Olafur's on-going investigations into the mechanisms of perception and the construction of space.

=== Ice Watch Series ===
The relation between bodily reaction and art as well as the raising of awareness of climate change is explored in Ice Watch (2014–2018). With the installation of enormous ice blocks in various places of the world (Copenhagen in 2014, Paris in 2015 and London in 2018), Olafur responds to major Climate Change conferences and reports. With his project beginning in 2014, he transports twelve ice-blocks from the Nuup Kangerlua fjord in Greenland to the streets of Copenhagen. The ice-blocks are placed in the shape of a circle. Each ice block weighs between 1.5 and 5 tonnes. In November 2015, Olafur together with geologist Minik Rosing again transported twelve enormous blocks of ice from Greenland to Place du Panthéon in Paris. The installation was timed with the UN Climate Change Conference that was held in Paris. The installation was once again repeated in 2018, when Olafur divided a total of thirty ice-blocks between two locations in London: 24 blocks at the banks of the Tate Modern museum, and 6 blocks before the Bloomberg headquarters.

Timothy Morton lists Ice Watch as an example of how art can help humans understand their relationship with nonhumans amidst ecological crisis, arguing that it "seriously stretched or went beyond prefabricated concepts, in a friendly and simple, yet deep way". Louise Hornby argued that Ice Watch has "poignancy" but also "funnels time and melting ice through the spectator's own experience ... The imperative to watch asserts the central agency of the experiencing subject", which is unfitting because the "glaciers will melt, whether or not we see them".

=== Vertical Panorama Pavilion (2022) ===
Commissioned by Mei and Allan Warburg for the Donum Estate winery in Sonoma, California, in 2019, the Vertical Panorama Pavilion is built to accommodate up to 12 guests and inspired by the history of circular calendars. The pavilion's roof features 832 laminated panels of recycled glass in 24 colors and is supported by 12 stainless-steel columns. From afar, only the translucent rainbow glass tiled canopy can be seen.

=== Your planetary assembly ===
In October 2025, Eliasson's first permanent public artwork in the United Kingdom was opened at Fallaize Park, in the Oxford North innovation district. It comprises eight illuminated sculptures that represent planetary bodies, and were inspired by orreries in the history of science museum in Oxford. The sculptures provided a centre-piece for science and theatre activities during the 2025 Oxford Science and Ideas Festival.

=== Other projects ===
In 2005–2007, Olafur and classical violin maker Hans Jóhannsson completed work on the development of a new instrument, with the objective to reinterpret the traditions of 17th- and 18th-century violin making using today's technology and a contemporary visual aesthetic.

Commissioned by Louis Vuitton in 2006, lamps titled Eye See You were installed in the Christmas windows of Louis Vuitton stores; a lamp titled You See Me went on permanent display at Louis Vuitton Fifth Avenue, New York. Each deliberately low-tech apparatus, of which there are about 400, is composed of a monofrequency light source and a parabolic mirror. All fees from the project were donated to 121Ethiopia.org, a charitable foundation initially established by Olafur and his wife to renovate an orphanage. Cynthia Zarin of The New Yorker described Your wave is (2006) as a "major work".

In 2007, Olafur developed the stage design for Phaedra, an opera production at the Berlin State Opera.

In a 2008 review of the Take Your Time retrospective (at the Museum of Modern Art), Peter Schjeldahl described Olafur as far superior to other "crowd-pleasing installational artists" of his generation; he wrote that the retrospective has some filler but also "lovely, subtly disorienting effects". He praised the artist as avoiding excessive political activism and Matthew Barney's "implications of mystical portent". Schjeldahl interpreted the artist as raising awareness "of the neurological susceptibilities that condition all of what we see and may think we know". Reviewing the same retrospective, Lauren Weinberg of Time Out praised Beauty (1993); the "discomfiting" works like 1997's Room for one colour and Ventilator; and the works involving the sense of smell, such as Moss wall (1994) and Soil quasi bricks (2003). She argued that Moss wall "evokes Scandinavia more powerfully than Eliasson's dozens of photographs of rivers, caves and other natural features of Iceland, which fill one room of the show".

His seventh solo exhibition, Volcanos and shelters at Tanya Bonakdar Gallery, is about nature and specifically Iceland. In The New York Times, Roberta Smith praised it as his "most gimmick-free [exhibition] in a while. The refreshing back-to-basics mood is a welcome break from the immersive complexities of his recent perception-altering environments."

Along with James Corner's landscape architecture firm Field Operations and architecture firm Diller Scofidio + Renfro, Olafur was part of the design team for New York's High Line park. Olafur was originally supposed to create an outdoor-based artwork for the 2012 Summer Olympics; however, his proposed £1 million ($1.6 million) project Take A Deep Breath – which involved recording people breathing – was rejected due to funding problems.

In 2012 Olafur and engineer Frederik Ottesen founded Little Sun, a company that produces solar powered LED lamps.

In 2014 it was announced that his work Kissing Earth, representing two globes, was to be placed in front of the newly built Rotterdam Centraal train station in the Netherlands. After protests by Rotterdam residents and concerns over the expected costs the impopular project was cancelled in 2016. The square in front of the station remained empty.

It was reported in October 2019 that Olafur was commissioned by the German government to create a "pan-European work of art" for the German European Council presidency in the second half of 2020.

Laura Cumming awarded the In real life survey four out of five stars, especially praising Your blind passenger. She found some of the art (like the ice boulders from Greenland) didactic but still wrote, "Each piece conveys the strange extremes of Iceland with all the condensed power of a sonnet". Anna Souter, however, expressed a lukewarm view of the In real life exhibition in Hyperallergic, writing that Room for one colour was more powerful at London's National Gallery than at Tate Modern and that Your uncertain shadow (colour) (2010) "feels like little more than a clever, visual trick." She also reported that some in the art world find Olafur's work unsettling because "[m]ost people like Olafur Eliasson, and many curators and critics don't like it when most people like the same things they do."

Olafur's AR Wunderkammer project, available through an app, is being used to place objects in the user's environment. These objects include burning suns, extraterrestrial rocks, and rare animals.

According to The Guardian, the works by Olafur that he considers highlights are Five Dimensional Pavilion (1998), Model room (2003), Sphere (2003), Your Invisible House (2003), The Parliament of Reality (2006–09), the facades of Harpa (2005–11), Your Rainbow Panorama (2006–2011), the 2007 Serpentine Gallery Pavilion, Colour activity house (2010), The Triangular Sky (2013), and Cirkelbroen (2015). He deemed Beauty (1993) and The presence of absence pavilion (2019) the highlights of the 2019–2020 In real life exhibition.

== Exhibitions ==
Olafur had his first solo show was with Nicolaus Schafhausen in Cologne in 1993, before moving to Berlin in 1994. In 1996, Olafur had his first show in the United States at Tanya Bonakdar Gallery. The San Francisco Museum of Modern Art (SFMOMA) organized Olafur's first major survey in the United States Take Your Time: Olafur Eliasson, from September 2007 to February 2008. Curated by the director of the Museum of Contemporary Art Chicago, Madeleine Grynsztejn (then Elise S. Haas Senior Curator of Painting and Sculpture at SFMOMA), in close collaboration with the artist, the major survey spanned the artist's career from 1993 and 2007. The exhibit included site-specific installations, large-scale immersive environments, freestanding sculpture, photography, and special commissions seen through a succession of interconnected rooms and corridors. The museum's skylight bridge was turned into an installation titled One-way colour tunnel. Following its San Francisco debut, the exhibit embarked on an international tour to the Museum of Modern Art, and P.S.1. Contemporary Art Center, New York, 2008; the Dallas Museum of Art, Dallas, Texas, 2008–2009; the Museum of Contemporary Art Chicago, 2009; and the Museum of Contemporary Art, Sydney 2009–2010.

He has also had major solo exhibitions at, among others, Kunsthaus Bregenz, Musée d'Art Moderne de Paris, and Center for Art and Media Karlsruhe (2001); Schirn Kunsthalle Frankfurt (2004); Hara Museum of Contemporary Art, Tokyo (2006); the Museum of Contemporary Art, Kanazawa, Ishikawa (2009); the Martin-Gropius-Bau, Berlin (2010) and the Langen Foundation, Museum Insel Hombroich, Neuss (2015). Olafur has also appeared in numerous group exhibitions, including the São Paulo Biennial and the Istanbul Biennial (1997), Venice Biennale (1999, 2001 and 2005), and the Carnegie International (1999), OPe Palace of Versailles (2016), The Parliament of Possibilities at Leeum, Samsung Museum of Art (2016–2017).

From July 2019 to through to January 2020, Tate Modern showed the exhibition In real life.

Until July 2025, Open, held at the Geffen Contemporary at the Museum of Contemporary Art, Los Angeles, was Olafur's first major exhibition in Los Angeles, consisting of installations of light and geometry including a large mirrored geodesic sphere. The Gallery of Modern Art, Brisbane, Australia, held the exhibition Presence from December 2025 to July 2026.

In October 2026, National Museum of Modern and Contemporary Art (MMCA) in Seoul unveiled Olafur’s site-specific installation, The unpredictable orbit. Suspended in the lobby, an illuminated compound polyhedron drifts along slow, erratic trajectories propelled by an oscillating fan, casting multifaceted reflections and subtle shadows that transform with the changing daylight.

== Collections ==
Olafur's work is held in the following permanent collections:

- Solomon R. Guggenheim Museum, New York
- Centre for International Light Art (CILA), Unna, Germany
- Museum of Contemporary Art, Los Angeles
- Colección Jumex, Mexico City, Mexico
- Baltimore Museum of Art, Baltimore
- SFMOMA, San Francisco

== Awards ==
The Spiral Pavilion, conceived in 1999 for the Venice Biennale and today on display at Kunsthalle Bielefeld, brought Olafur Eliasson the Benesse Prize by the Benesse Corporation. In 2004, Olafur won the Nykredit Architecture Prize and the Eckersberg Medal for painting. The following year he was awarded the Prince Eugen Medal for sculpture and in 2006, the Crown Prince Couple's Culture Prize. In 2006, he received the Austrian Frederick Kiesler Prize for Architecture and the Arts. In 2007, he was awarded the first Joan Miró Prize by the Joan Miró Foundation.

In 2010, Olafur was the recipient of a Quadriga award. He returned his award one year later after it was revealed that Vladimir Putin would be recognized in 2011. In October 2013, he was honored with the Goslarer Kaiserring. That same year, Olafur and Henning Larsen Architects were recipients of the Mies van der Rohe Award for their Harpa Concert Hall and Conference Center in Reykjavik, Iceland.

In 2014, Olafur was the recipient of the $100,000 Eugene McDermott Award in the Arts at MIT (Massachusetts Institute of Technology). The prize is considered an investment in the recipient's future creative work, rather than a prize for a particular project or lifetime of achievement. The awardee becomes an artist in residence at MIT, studying and teaching for a period of time.

On the occasion of a state visit to Germany in June 2013, the President of Iceland, Ólafur Ragnar Grímsson, visited Studio Olafur Eliasson in Berlin.

Brazilian filmmaker Karim Aïnouz's documentary piece, Domingo, shot from his encounter with Olafur during the 17th Videobrasil Festival, had its world premiere at Rio International Film Festival] in 2014, and was released on DVD in 2015. received Praemium Imperiale(2023)

== Personal life ==
In 2003, Olafur married the Danish art historian Marianne Krogh Jensen, whom he met when she curated the Danish Pavilion for the 1997 São Paulo Art Biennial. They adopted both their son (in 2003) and their daughter (in 2006) in Addis Ababa, Ethiopia. The family had lived in a house designed by architect Andreas Lauritz Clemmensen in Hellerup near Copenhagen, but Olafur and Jensen are no longer married. Olafur currently lives and works in Berlin. Olafur speaks Icelandic, Danish, German, and English. He also has a younger half-sister named Victoria Eliasdottir who is a chef.

On 22 September 2019, Olafur was appointed as Goodwill Ambassador by the United Nations Development Programme "to advocate for urgent action on climate change and sustainable development goals." In the context of his appointment, Olafur emphasized the need to stay positive: "I also think it's important not to lose sight of what is actually going quite well. There is reason for hope. I believe in hope as such and I'm generally a positive person. And when you think about it: it has never been better to be a young African girl, for instance."

== See also ==
- List of exhibitions by Olafur Eliasson
