= Einar Thorsteinn =

Einar Thorsteinn Asgeirsson (June 17,1942–April 28, 2015) was an Icelandic architect with an interest in geometrical structures. Einar Thorsteinn was a follower of Buckminster Fuller and he worked with polyhedral and spherical shapes. He graduated from Technical University of Hannover. He worked with Frei Otto from 1969 to 1972 helping to design the Munich Olympiapark for the 1972 Summer Olympics. He then started the Constructions Lab in Iceland and experimented with tensile structures. He started a long collaboration with artist Olafur Eliasson. Early results from the collaboration included geodesic dome structures, he also worked with cells with fivefold symmetry used in the Harpa Reykjavik Concert Hall. He also worked with Guillermo Trotti to design mobile lunar research laboratories for NASA.
