= Charlie Parr =

American country blues musician (born 1967)

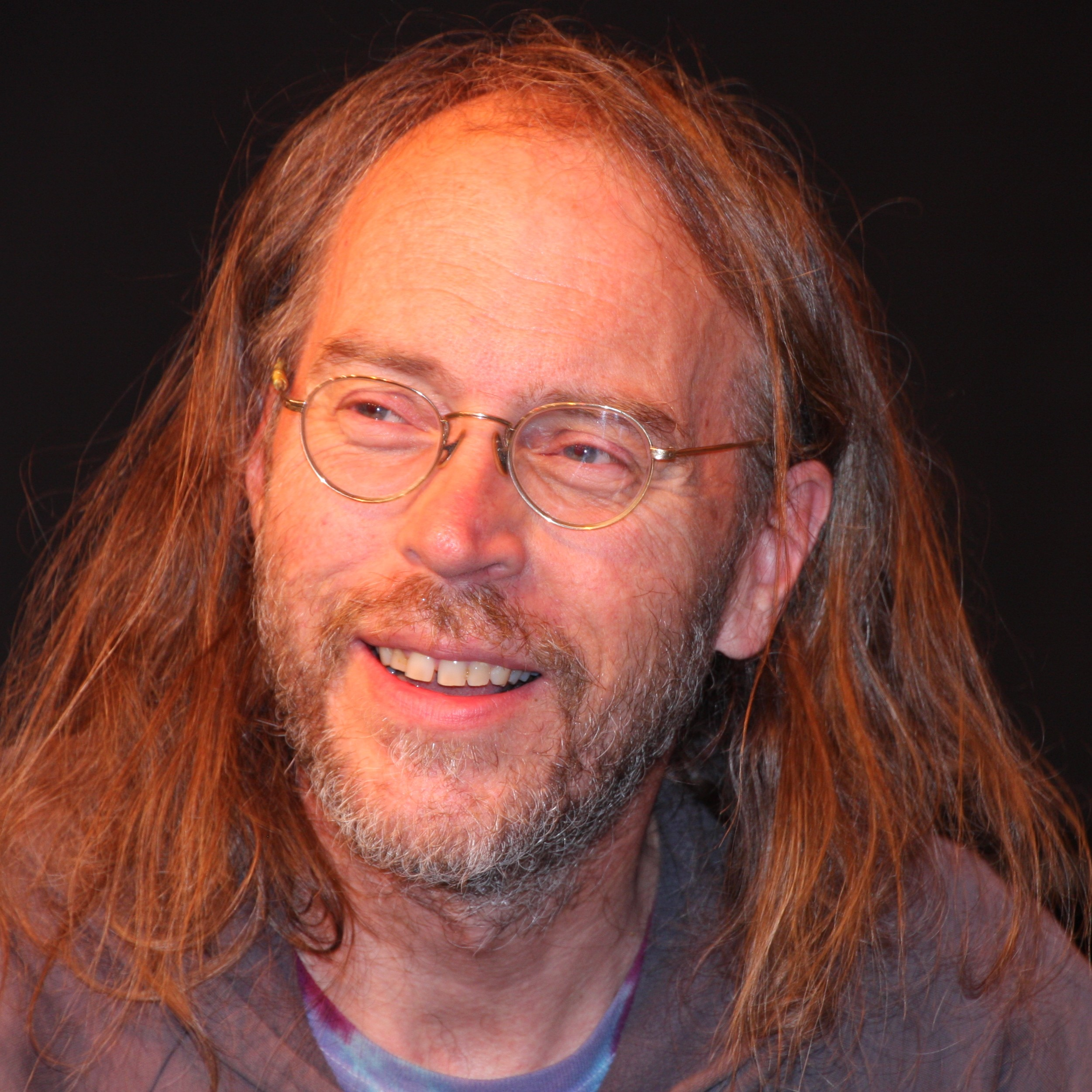
- Parr in 2017

Background information
- Born: 1967 (age 58–59); Austin, Minnesota, United States
- Origin: Duluth, Minnesota, United States
- Genres: Piedmont blues, blues-rock
- Occupations: Musician, singer, songwriter, guitarist
- Instruments: Vocals, guitar, harmonica, banjo
- Years active: 2002–present
- Labels: Misplaced Music, Little Judges, Shaky Ray Records, Red House Records
- Website: https://www.charlieparr.com/

Charlie Parr (born 1967) is an American country blues musician. Born in Austin, Minnesota, he spent part of his childhood in Hollandale before starting his music career in Duluth. His influences include Charlie Patton, Bukka White, Reverend Gary Davis, Dave Van Ronk, Mississippi John Hurt, and his self-professed "hero" "Spider" John Koerner. He plays a Mule resonator, National resonator guitar, a fretless open-back banjo, and a twelve-string guitar, often in the Piedmont blues style. He is divorced from Emily Parr, who occasionally adds vocals to his music. He has two children.

His song "1922" was featured in an Australian, New Zealand and Dutch television advertisement for Vodafone. As a consequence his album 1922 was re-released in Australia on the Level 2 record label in Melbourne. In 2009, Parr toured Australia with Paul Kelly.

Several of Parr's songs were featured in the Australian drama film Red Hill (2010), including a full rendition of "Just Like Today" in the closing credits of the film. His music was also featured in the background of a commercial for Gerber Gear entitled "Hello Trouble". It features the song "Ain't No Grave Gonna Hold My Body Down".

Parr played at the 2011 Pickathon Music Festival in Oregon and the 2012 Willamina's Wildwood MusicFest & Campout and has been a featured performer at the Mid West Music Fest.

Before his death in 2024, Minneapolis blues musician Spider John Koerner gave his 12-string Gretsch guitar to Parr, requesting that Parr continue using it on stage.

== Discography ==
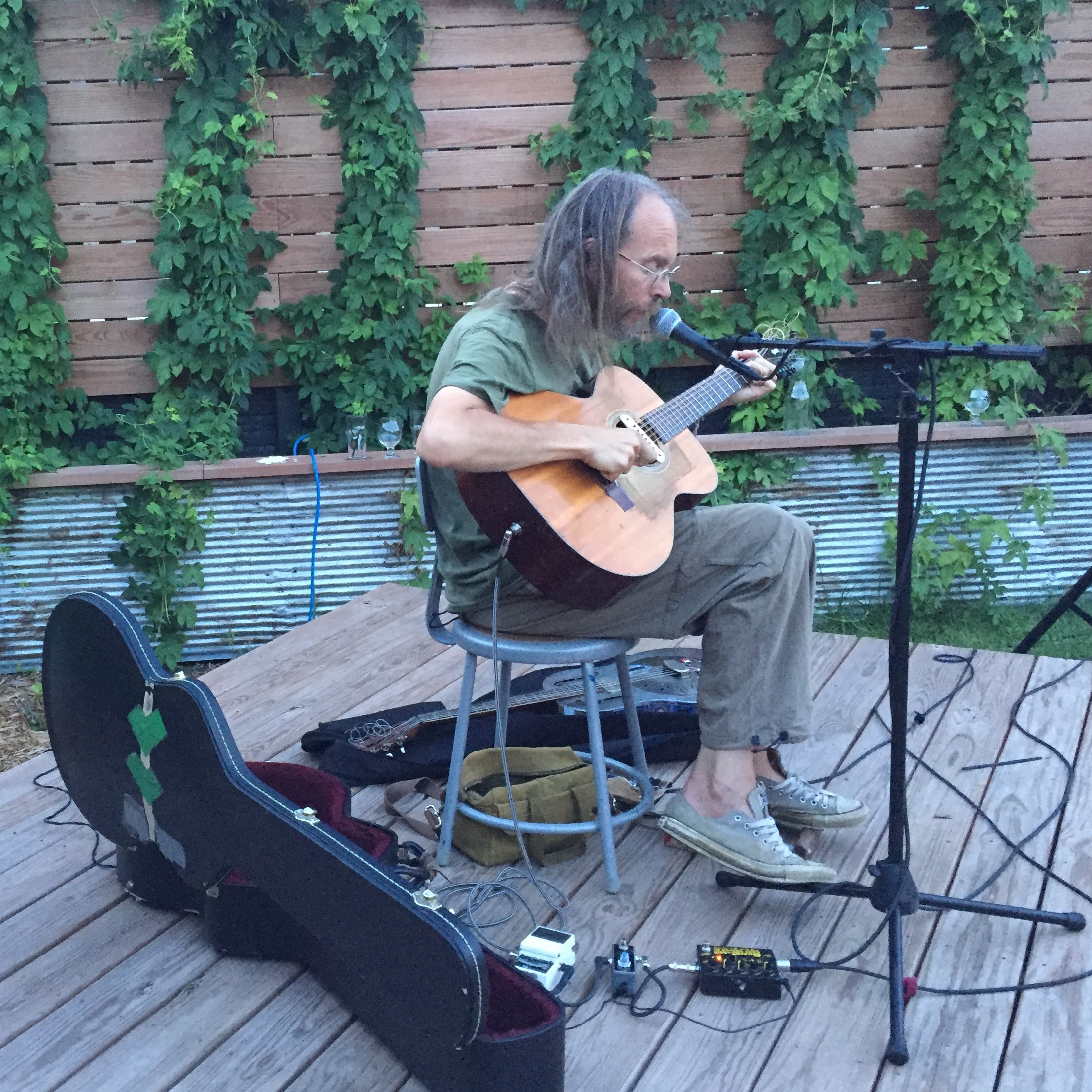
Parr playing a 12-string guitar in 2016

=== Albums ===
Year	Title	Label	Notes
2002	Criminals & Sinners	Shaky Ray Records / Misplaced Music	Two CD versions: Shaky Ray Records SRR027 and Misplaced Music MM104 (UK re-release, 1000 copies pressed, 2004), both out of print; LP version released September 2011
2002	1922	Self-released / Level Two Music	Multiple CD versions, all out of print: 2002 original jewel case; 2008 handmade letterpress sleeve version; 2008 Australian Level Two Music release with different cover art and bonus tracks
2004	King Earl	Misplaced Music / Chaperone Records	Misplaced Music MM107 CD, 1000 copies pressed, out of print; 10" double LP re-release by Chaperone Records in 2012 (CRL-004), which came with a version of the CD
2005	Rooster	Little Judges / Eclectone Records	Little Judges LJ001 (jewel case), Eclectone Records ECL012 (digipak); jewel case re-released in 2008, out of print as of April 2011
2006	Backslider	Self-released	Live album; some tracks with Trampled by Turtles; out of print
2007	Jubilee	Little Judges	
2008	Roustabout	Misplaced Music	Misplaced Music MM113; limited February 2009 vinyl release in UK (500 copies); out of print
2010	When the Devil Goes Blind	Nero's Neptune Records	Nero's Neptune Records 016; out of print; also on vinyl
2011	Keep Your Hands on the Plow	House of Mercy Recordings	House of Mercy Recordings MR026, CD and LP; with Emily Parr, Four Mile Portage, and Alan Sparhawk and Mimi Parker of the band Low
2013	Barnswallow	Tin Angel Records	TAR034 CD and LP
2013	I Dreamed I Saw Paul Bunyan Last Night	Chaperone Records	LP, to accompany the documentary DVD Meeting Charlie Parr (2013)
2013	Live at the Brewhouse	—	From the 2006 Backslider shows, with a different set of songs from those issued on the Backslider CD
2014	Hollandale	Chaperone Records	CD
2015	Stumpjumper	Red House Records	CD
2017	Dog	Red House Records	CD/Vinyl
2019	Charlie Parr	Red House Records	CD/Vinyl
2021	Last of the Better Days Ahead	Smithsonian Folkways Recordings	CD/Vinyl
2024	Little Sun	Smithsonian Folkways Recordings	CD/Vinyl
2026	Rooming House	Smithsonian Folkways Recordings	CD/Vinyl

=== DVDs ===
- Meeting Charlie Parr (2013)

=== Collaborations ===
- Glory in the Meeting House (2010, CD with the Black Twig Pickers as backing band, House of Mercy Recordings MR024)
- EastMont Syrup (2011, Thrill Jockey 268, LP; one side by the Black Twig Pickers with Charlie Parr, the other side by Glenn Jones, Even to Win Is to Fail; Record Store Day 2011 regional release 12" vinyl LP, limited to 1000 copies; liner notes include "Cooking with Charlie", giving "recipes" for stew, bread, and a nut snack)

=== Compilation albums ===
- Too Much Liquor, Not Enough Gasoline (2009; CD. Independent Records Ireland INDCD80. Limited edition compilation featuring tracks from previous albums. Out of print).
- Cheap Wine (2011; Tin Angel Records CD)

=== Promotional CD singles ===
- "Charlie Parr" (2010. Level Two Music. Australian two-track CD supporting release of When the Devil Goes Blind. Contained "I Dreamed I Saw Jesse James Last Night" and "Turpentine Farm". In a cardboard sleeve.)
- "1922 Blues" (2010. Tin Angel Records. Two track promotional CD from the United Kingdom. Includes "1922 Blues" and "God Moves on the Water". In plastic sleeve with paper insert.)

=== 7" singles ===
- "Worried Blues" (2008; End of the Road Records EOTR0007. A 7" LP single limited to 500 copies. Featured "Worried Blues" (from King Earl) and "Write Me a Few Lines" (previously unreleased).
- "Where You Gonna' Be (When the Good Lord Calls You Home?" (2010; Great Pops Supplement GPS59. A 7" LP single limited to 400 copies. Title track from Glory in the Meeting House, unreleased B-side traditional titled "Step Back Cindy". Autumn 2010 UK tour release with The Black Twin Pickers).

=== Contributions to other compilations ===
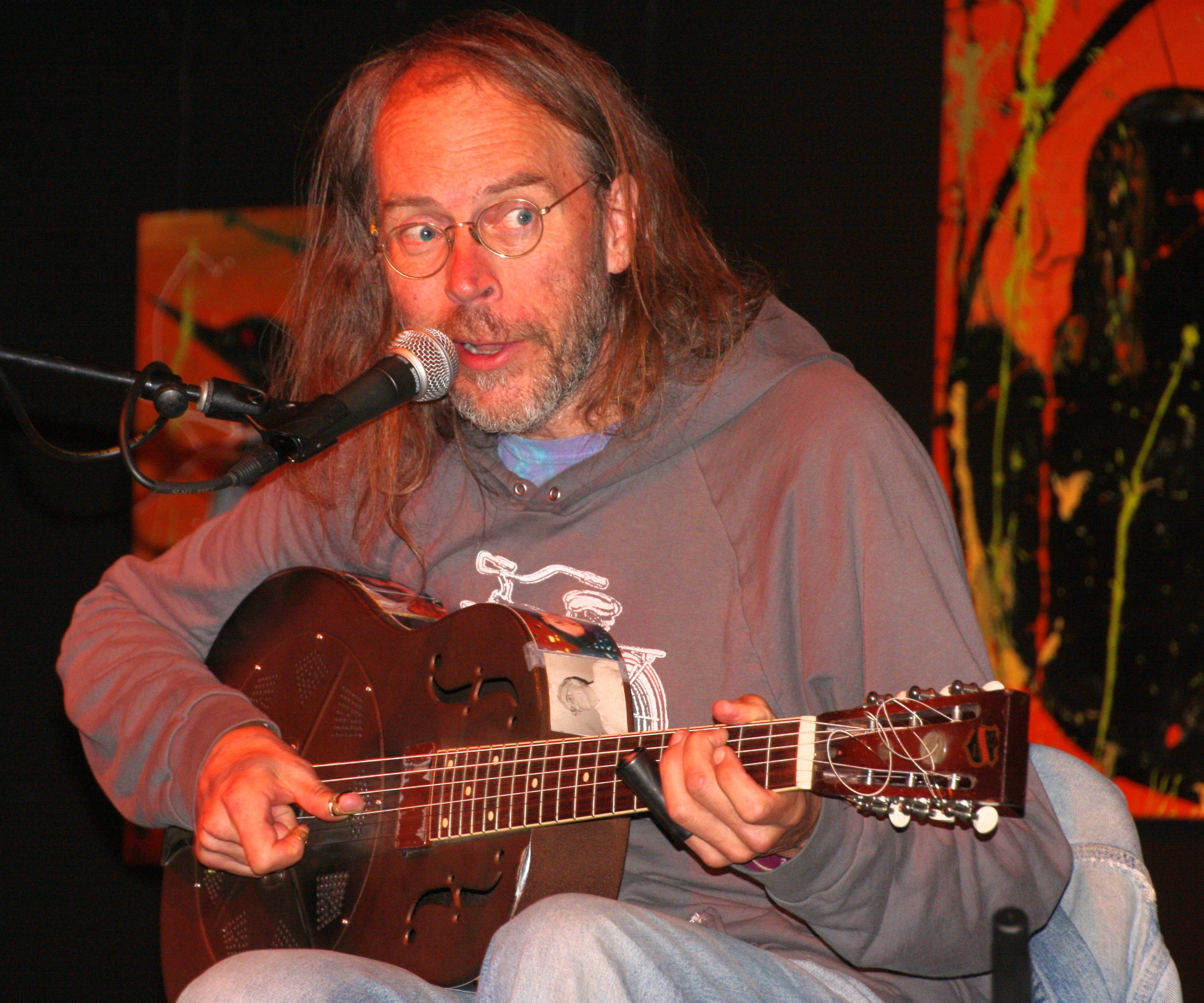
Parr playing a six string guitar

- Iron Country (2003; Spinout Records SOR104. Parr played on track 3: "Right Between the Eyes")
- Misplaced Pets (2004; Misplaced Music MM105. Parr played on track 22: "Roses While I'm Living")
- Keepsake Volume 2: Covers (2005; Keepsake Records KR14. Limited to 100 hand-numbered copies with handmade, sewn packaging. Parr played on track 5: "Pretty Polly" (by Doc Boggs). Out of print)
- Concert For Kateri (2006. Limited to 100 hand-numbered CD-Rs; a 4 track EP. From a benefit at the Cedar Cultural Center in Minneapolis, Minnesota, celebrating Native American women in recovery. Parr played on track 4: "Green Rocky Road". Out of print)
- Who Killed Cock Robin? (2005. Soundtrack to Who Killed Cock Robin?). Parr, who also acted in the movie, played on tracks 2 ("Who Killed Cock Robin?") and 15 ("1917"; from the album, King Earl). Out of print)
- Duluth Does Dylan Revisited (2006; Spinout Records SOR116. Parr played on track 1: "Blind Willie McTell").
- Treasure Chest (2007; Benefit album for Pearl Swanson. Parr played on track 1: "Green Rocky Road".)
- Rough Trade Shops: Singer Songwriter 1 (2006; Mute Records CDStumm273. Two disc set. Parr played on track 13 of disc 2: "To a Scrapyard Bustop" (from the album 1922).
- The Lot: Echolocations Disc 6.1 (2008. This was the last of the subscription-only compilation discs pressed by EchoLocations (formerly InRadio) before the company folded. Parr played on track 8: "Coffee's Gone Cold" (from the album Jubilee). Also out of print)
- Think Out Loud: Music Serving the Homeless in the Twin Cities. (2010. Ezekiel Records. Parr provided instrumentation and possibly backing vocals on two tracks.)
- Old Stage Tapes (2010. Old Stage Presents. Two live tracks by Parr. Tracks 1 ("Wild Bill Jones") and 13 ("Cheap Wine"). Recorded live April–October 2006 at the Turf Club in St. Paul, Minnesota.)
- Local Current Volume 1 (2011. 89.3 The Current. Features Minnesota artists. Parr played on track 12: "Where You Gonna Be (When the Good Lord Calls You Home?)").
