= Mike Kelley (artist) =

American artist (1954–c.2012)

- Born: October 27, 1954; Wayne, Michigan, U.S.
- Died: c. January 31, 2012 (aged 57); South Pasadena, California, U.S.
- Education: University of Michigan, California Institute of the Arts
- Known for: sculpture, installation, performance
- Awards: Wolfgang Hahn Prize; 2006; John Simon Guggenheim Memorial Foundation Fellowship; 2003; The California Institute of the Arts Distinguished Alumnus Award; 2000
- Website: mikekelley.com

Michael Kelley (October 27, 1954 – c. January 31, 2012) was an American artist whose work involved found objects, textile banners, drawings, assemblage, collage, performance, photography, sound and video. He also worked on curatorial projects; collaborated with many other artists and musicians; and left a formidable body of critical and creative writing. He often worked collaboratively and had produced projects with artists Paul McCarthy, Tony Oursler, and John Miller. Writing in The New York Times, in 2012, Holland Cotter described the artist as "one of the most influential American artists of the past quarter century and a pungent commentator on American class, popular culture and youthful rebellion."

== Early life ==
Kelley was born in Wayne, Michigan, a suburb of Detroit, to a working-class Roman Catholic family in October 1954. His father was in charge of maintenance for a public school system; his mother was a cook in the executive dining room at Ford Motor Company. In his early years he was involved with the area's music scene and was a member of the noise band Destroy All Monsters. In 1976, Kelley graduated from the University of Michigan and then moved to Los Angeles. In 1978, he graduated from the California Institute of the Arts with a Master of Fine Arts, where he admired the work of his teachers John Baldessari, Laurie Anderson, David Askevold and Douglas Huebler and fully embraced the ideals of the avant-garde.

== Work ==
During his time at CalArts, Kelley started to work on a series of projects in which he explored works with loose poetic themes, such as The Sublime, Monkey Island and Plato's Cave, Rothko's Chapel, Lincoln's Profile, using a variety of different media such as drawing, painting, sculpture, performance, video, and writing. In the 1980s, he became known for working with another type of material: crocheted blankets, fabric dolls and other rag toys found at thrift stores and yard sales. The introduction of textiles in his work drew significant inspiration from feminist art, particularly the “femmage” technique developed by Miriam Schapiro, a form of collage combining painting, textiles, and paper that sought to elevate traditional modes of women’s handcraft. Perhaps the most famous work in this vein, More Love Hours Than Can Ever Be Repaid and The Wages of Sin from 1987, featured a mess of used rag dolls, animals and blankets strewn across a canvas, a way of investing a fictional childhood scene with some visceral pathos which was first shown at Rosamund Felsen Gallery in Los Angeles. In 1988, Kelley created an installation called Pay for Your Pleasure, which featured a gallery of portraits of men of genius – poets, philosophers and artists included – subverted at the end by a painting created by a convicted criminal. In From My Institution to Yours (1988) and Proposal for the Decoration of an Island of Conference Rooms (1992), Kelley appropriated photocopied drawings and other ephemera of vernacular office humor and moved it into more formalized environments where such crude materials are normally not seen.

Kelley often employed soft, tangled toys as a satirical metaphor for Expressionist art. In Deodorized Central Mass with Satellites (1991–99), an installation sculpture made from untidy clusters of toys suspended from the ceiling, a dozen monochrome plush-toy spheres, linked by a system of cables and pulleys across the ceiling, orbit around a central, rainbow-colored blob; ten large, geometrically faceted, brightly colored wall-reliefs are actually monumental dispensers of pine-scented air freshener, which automatically send their cleansing spray into the room at timed intervals.

In 1995, he produced Educational Complex, an architectural model of the institutions in which he had studied, including his Catholic elementary school and the University of Michigan in Ann Arbor. According to the Whitney Museum of American Art, the work's selective inclusion of institutional locations and features responds to "the rising infatuation of the public with issues of repressed memory syndrome and child abuse... The implication is that anything that can't be remembered is somehow the result of trauma." In 1999, he made a short video in which Superman recites selections from Sylvia Plath's The Bell Jar.

Kelley was in the band Poetics with fellow California Institute of the Arts students John Miller and Tony Oursler. In 1997–98, Kelley and Oursler presented the Poetics Project at Documenta X, as well as at venues in Los Angeles, New York, and Tokyo; through video projections, sound, and artworks, this installation re-created their experience at CalArts as members of a short-lived band. Along with his collaborations with Shaw and Oursler, Kelley was also known for working with artist Paul McCarthy in the 1990s. They collaborated on a series of video projects, including a 1992 work based on Johanna Spyri's classic children's book, "Heidi". A 1986 Massachusetts Institute of Technology presentation of Kelley's performance Plato's Cave, Rothko's Chapel, Lincoln's Profile (1985) included a live performance by Sonic Youth; the band later featured his orange-knit creatures on the cover and booklet of their 1992 record Dirty. In 2010, he combined with Artangel to realize his first work of public art in Detroit.

In November 2005, Kelley staged Day is Done, filling Gagosian Gallery with funhouse-like multimedia installations, including automated furniture, as well as films of dream-like ceremonies inspired by high school year book photos of pageants, sports matches and theater productions. In December 2005, Village Voice art critic Jerry Saltz described "Day is Done" as a pioneering example of "clusterfuck aesthetics," the tendency towards overloaded multimedia environments in contemporary art. "Day is Done" was Kelley' s "Gesamtkunstwerk", this body of work was initiated with 'Extracurricular Activity Projective Reconstruction #1 (Domestic Scene), the work was produced by Emi Fontana and first exhibited in her gallery in Milano in 2000. In the same year Emi Fontana and Mike Kelley started a romantic relationship that lasted for seven years, and led to Fontana relocating to Los Angeles.

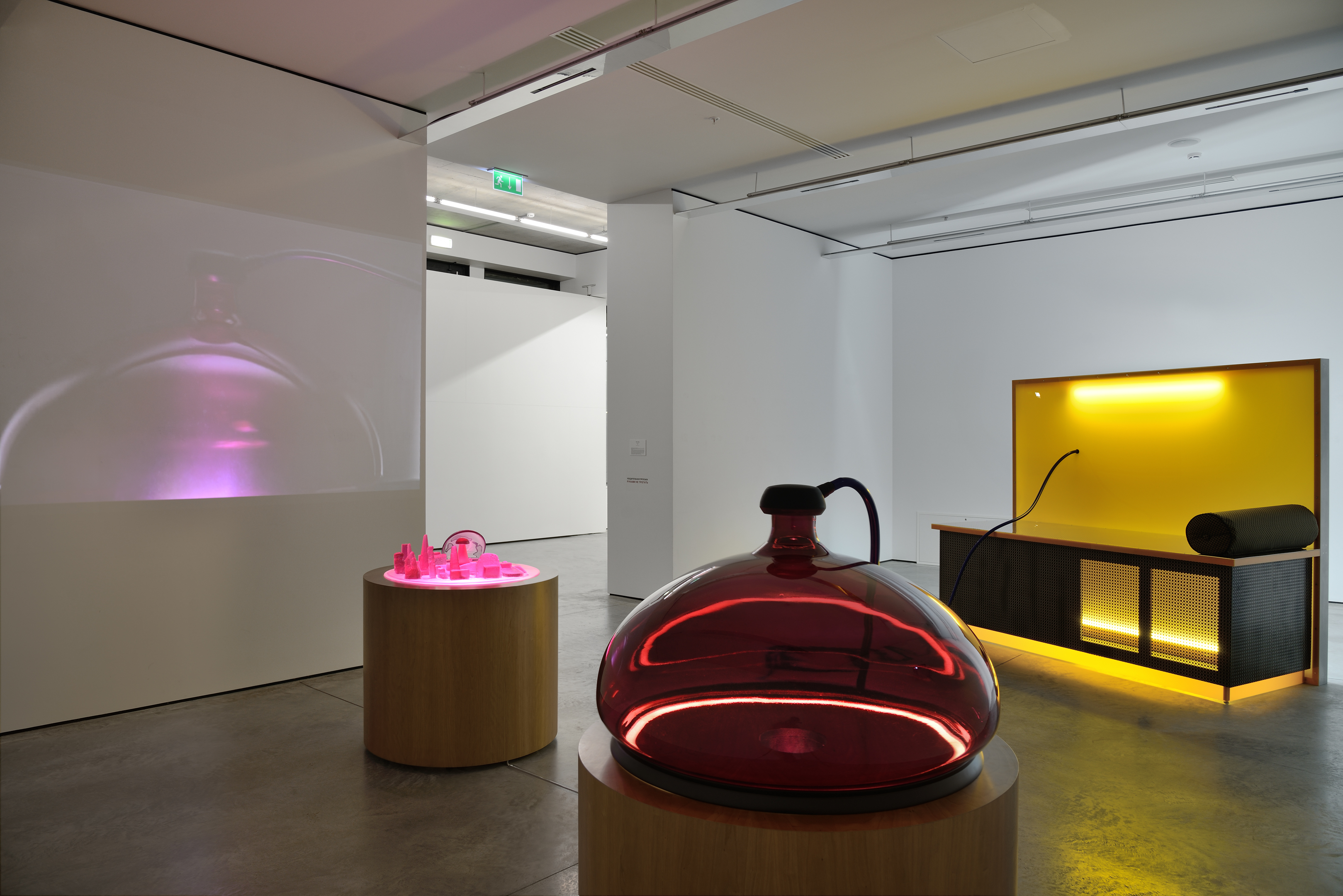
Kandor 20, 2007 by Mike Kelley from group exhibition 'Mutated Reality' at Gary Tatintsian Gallery in 2015.

Begun in 1999, the Kandor project deals with the town of Kandor, on the planet Krypton from which the child Kal-El escaped to Earth, where he became Superman. Kandor's depiction in these narratives is inconsistent and fragmentary, prompting Kelley to create multiple versions of it, cast in colorful resins and illuminated like reliquaries. Kandor 4 (2007) includes a giant bell jar and an air compressor pump. The installation Kandor-Con 2000 was first presented in the millennium show at Kunstmuseum Bonn and later at Technische Universität Berlin (2007), the Deichtorhallen/Sammlung Falckenberg, Hamburg (2007); ZKM, Karlsruhe (2008); the Shanghai Biennial (2008); and the Centre Pompidou, Paris (2010). Kandor-Con 2000 is conceived – and continued to develop – as a work in progress. Throughout the exhibitions, architecture students built cardboard models of Kandor inspired by the original comics. These models were sent to Pasadena, where Kelley made scaled down casts. Kandor 10A (2010), a yellow city housed in a hand-blown, pink glass bottle, is a grouping of tall skyscrapers situated within a full-scale rock grotto. Kandor 10B (Exploded Fortress of Solitude) (2011) is a pile of dark boulders and slabs forming a cave with a quarry-like foyer made from faux black rock and built on a scale that invites the viewer into the forbidden fortress. Set within the cave's inner recesses is a glowing rose-colored city-in-a-bottle. Kandor 12, constructed in off-white resin and evocative of a group of chess pawns, or minarets, is encased in a shadowy brown bottle, which sits on a platform resembling a Greek column positioned in front of a chest of drawers and an illuminated translucent green wall.

In 2004, Kelley's exhibition and catalogue, "Mike Kelley: The Uncanny" at Tate Liverpool and Mumok featured Andy Warhol's Andy Warhol Robot.' Frieze (magazine) writes: "Taking its cue from the resurgence of figurative sculpture in the late 1980s and early 1990s, and Sigmund Freud's essay 'The Uncanny' (1919), the exhibition brings together mannequin-related artworks, mostly from the 1960s onwards," including from ancient Egypt to the early 2000s. In Freud's 'The Uncanny,' he writes, "It may be true that the uncanny is nothing else than a hidden, familiar thing that has undergone repression and then emerged from it." Kelley explores "memory, recollection, horror and anxiety through the juxtaposition of a highly personal collection of objects with realist figurative sculpture." Kelley remarks in his essay for the exhibition, "works develop a life of their own by virtue of their existence in the world outside of my control," and "I had intended to rework the original essay for 'The Uncanny,' "Playing with Dead Things," into dialogue form for a theater piece but never got around to it," akin to Warhol's urgings for his "No-Man Show" theater piece with Lewis Allen and Peter Sellars. Kelley also makes reference to Jack Burnham who writes, "the liberalizing tendencies of modern art and the discoveries of archaeology finally compelled historians to consider the aesthetic merits of [substratum figures as a fine art] and an increasing range of other anthropomorphic forms," and Janine Chasseguet-Smirgel who shares, "lying between life and death, animated and mechanic, hybrid creatures and creatures to which hubris gave birth, they all may be liked to fetishes."

In 2009, Kelley collaborated with longtime friend and fellow artist Michael Smith on "A Voyage of Growth and Discovery", a six-channel video and sculptural installation piece. This piece was conceived in 2007 and curated by Emi Fontana, produced by Kelley himself and West of Rome Public Art. The work was first installed at the Sculpture Center, New York in 2009, The Farley Building (former Kelley studio) for West of Rome in 2010, and The BALTIC Centre for Contemporary Art in 2011.

Also in 2009, Kelley participated in Performa 09, the third edition of the Performa Biennial, where he created Extracurricular Activity Projective Reconstruction #32, Plus. For this performance, Kelley translated his filmed material into highly energetic scenes of music and psychodynamic drama.

The artist's last performance video was Vice Anglais from 2011.

On January 31, 2012, Kelley committed suicide via carbon monoxide poisoning at his home in South Pasadena, California. It is believed that Kelley was suffering from depression at the time of his death. A spontaneous memorial to Kelley was built in an abandoned carport near his studio in the Highland Park section of L.A. shortly after news of his death. Mourners were invited via an anonymous Facebook page to "help rebuild MORE LOVE HOURS THAN CAN EVER BE REPAID AND THE WAGES OF SIN (1987), by contributing stuffed fabric toys, afghans, dried corn, wax candles…building an altar of unabashed sentimentality." The memorial was active throughout February 2012 and was dismantled in early March 2012, with the contents given to the Mike Kelley Foundation.

Kelley's work was inspired by diverse sources such as philosophy, politics, history, underground music, decorative arts and working-class artistic expression. His art often examined class and gender issues as well as issues of normality, criminality and perversion.

Kelley lived and worked in various places in Los Angeles, among them the Farley Building in Eagle Rock.

== Exhibitions ==
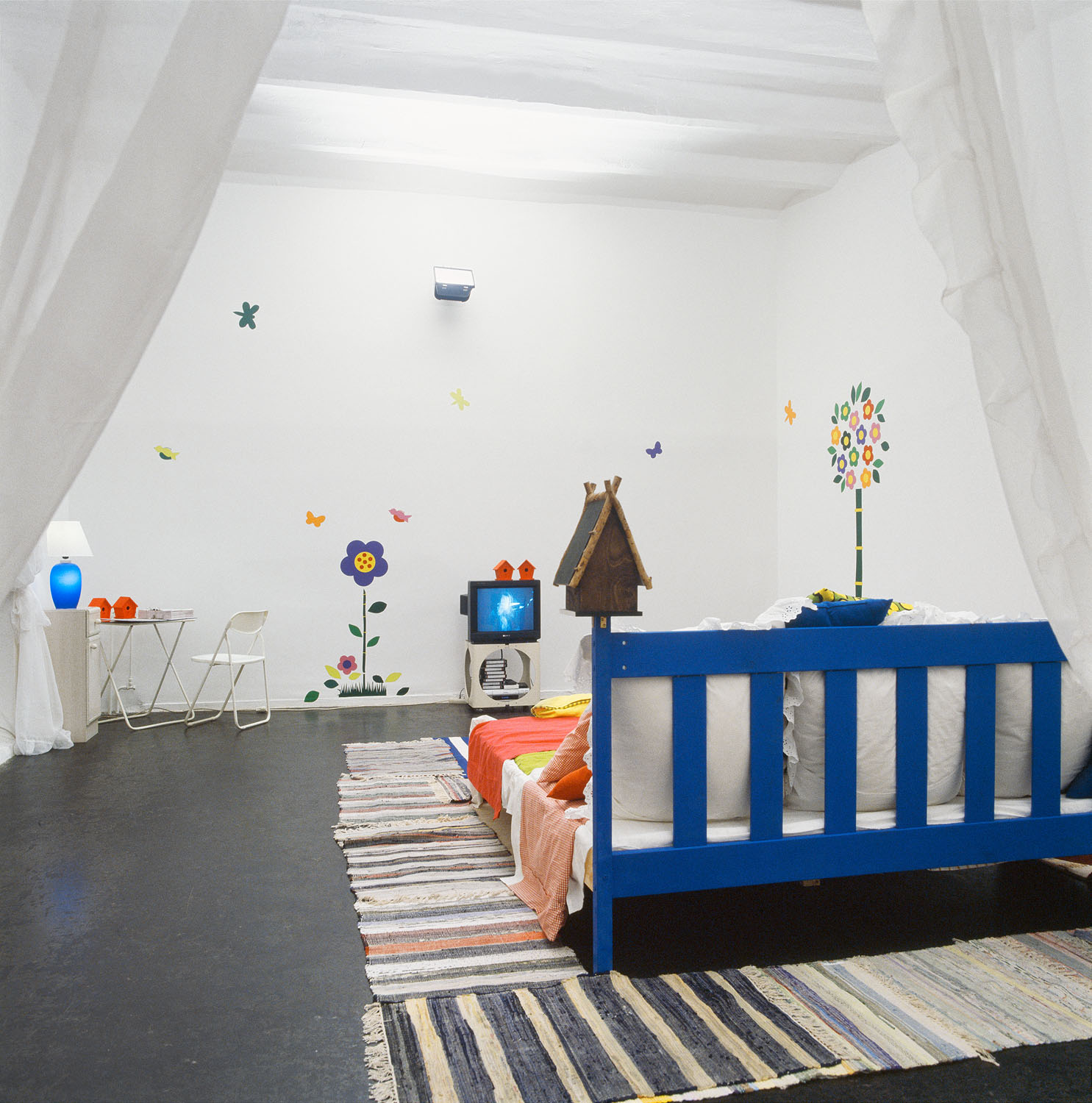
Installation 'Unisex Love Nest', 2000 by Mike Kelley

Kelley began having regular solo exhibitions at Metro Pictures Gallery in Manhattan in 1982, and at Rosamund Felsen Gallery in Los Angeles the following year. He subsequently started to gain recognition outside Los Angeles in the mid-eighties with the sculptural objects and installations from the series Half-a-Man. In 2002, Metro Pictures Gallery in New York City showed "Mike Kelley: Reversals, Recyclings, Completions, and Late Editions" from November 2-December 7. In 2005, he had his first solo show at Gagosian Gallery in New York City, which was representing him at his death. A retrospective, "Mike Kelley: Catholic Tastes," appeared at the Whitney Museum of American Art in 1993 and traveled to Los Angeles and Munich; a second retrospective appeared at the Museum of Contemporary Art in Barcelona in 1997; and a third was at the Tate Liverpool in 2004. In 2006, his show "Profondeurs Vertes" was presented at the Musée du Louvre (2006). A major retrospective exhibition was held after the reopening of the Stedelijk Museum, Amsterdam in 2012, and traveled to the MOCA, Los Angeles in 2014. The many group exhibitions he participated in include the Whitney Biennial (1985, 1987, 1989, 1991, 1993, 1995, 2002, and 2012), Venice Biennale (1988 and 1995), Carnegie International (1991), Documenta 9 and 10 (1992 and 1997), and SITE Santa Fe Biennial (2004).

In 2012, the Museum of Contemporary Art Detroit received a grant to complete Kelley's unfinished project Mobile Homestead, a large-scale replica of the artist's home in suburban Detroit. The detachable facade of the home, set on a street-legal trailer, is meant to travel from city to city hosting art, educational and social services initiatives. During its exhibition at the Museum of Contemporary Art, Los Angeles, Mobile Homestead hosts a series of "public service activations," including a lunch-making workshop led by the Local United Network to Combat Hunger, a School on Wheels donation drive, an American Red Cross Blood Services event and an L.A. Human Right to Housing Project/Community Action Network-hosted Rent Control Tenant Meeting.

The Watermill Center staged an exhibition of Kelley's video and sound installations, as well as works from the "Kandor" series in 2012. The Exhibition, "Mike Kelley: 1954-2012," was voted "Best show in a non-profit gallery or alternative space" in 2012 by the International Association of Art Critics.

On October 13, 2013, the largest exhibition of Kelley's works opened in the MoMA PS1 in New York City. On December 14, 2015, a selection of Kelley's videos as well as collaborative pieces were screened at REDCAT in Los Angeles. From November 3 - December 23, 2016, Hauser & Wirth in New York showed "Mike Kelley: Memory Ware."

A large-scale retrospective Ghost and Spirit devoted to Kelley, opened at the Bourse de Commerce in Paris, Pinault Collection in 2023 (October 13, 2023 - February 19, 2024). The exhibition was organized by Tate Modern, London in collaboration with the Pinault Collection, Paris, K21 – Kunstsammlung Nordrhein-Westfalen, Düsseldorf, and the Moderna Museet, Stockholm. The show travelled to all these venues after Paris, with the Tate Modern show (3 October 2024 – 9 March 2025) becoming the first major UK exhibition of Mike Kelley, receiving strong reviews from the Guardian & Telegraph.

The Mike Kelley Foundation currently has the 1987 piece “Deodorized Central Mass with Satellites” On display at The Museum of Modern Art (MoMA), located in New York City. The piece itself features 13 hanging sculptures surrounding one large sculpture made from a varying assortment of stuffed animals stitched together, coded by color and with the faces sewn into the body of each sculpture. The piece was partially gifted to the MoMA by Peter M. Brant, of the Brant Foundation.

== Collections ==
During the artist's lifetime, German art-book publisher Benedikt Taschen and Los Angeles-based businessman Kourosh Larizadeh were the principal collectors who bought Kelley's work in depth. In 2001, Kelley himself donated three works by fellow artists William Leavitt, Franz West and Jim Isermann to the Museum of Contemporary Art, Los Angeles.

=== Selected public collections ===
Carnegie Museum, Pittsburgh
Centre Georges Pompidou, Paris
Detroit Institute of Art, Detroit
Fonds National d’Art Contemporain
Fundación “la Caixa”, Madrid
Los Angeles County Museum of Art
Louisiana Museum, Humleback, Denmark
Metropolitan Museum of Art, New York
Museum Abteiberg Mönchengladbach, Mönchengladbach, Germany
Museum Moderner Kunst, Vienna
Museum of Contemporary Art, Chicago
Museum of Contemporary Art, Los Angeles
Museum of Fine Arts, Boston
Museum of Modern Art, New York
Solomon R. Guggenheim Museum, New York
Statens Museum for Kunst, Copenhagen
Stedelijke Museum, Eindhoven
The Art Institute of Chicago
Van Abbe Museum, Eindhoven
Walker Art Center, Minneapolis
Whitney Museum of American Art, New York

== Awards ==
2006 Wolfgang Hahn prize, Society of Modern Art, Museum Ludwig
2003 John Simon Guggenheim Memorial Foundation Fellowship
2000 The California Institute of the Arts Distinguished Alumnus Award
1998 The University of Michigan School of Art and Design Distinguished Alumnus Award
1997 Skowhegan Medal for Mixed Media
1990 National Endowment for the Arts Museum Program Exhibition Grant
1987 Awards in the Visual Arts Grant
1986 Artists Space Interarts Grant
1985 National Endowment for the Arts Visual Artists Fellowship Grant
1984 Louis Comfort Tiffany Foundation Grant

== Art market ==
The artist's most expensive works sold at auction:

1. $3,301,000 – Memory Ware Flat #1, 2000. Christie's, May 10, 2016.
2. $2,887,500 – Memory Ware Flat #16, 2001. Christie's, May 17, 2017.
3. $2,853,000 – Memory Ware Flat #24, 1954-2012. Christie's, November 11, 2015.
4. $2,400,000 – Deodorized central mass with satellites, 1991. Phillips, November 16, 2006.
5. $2,348,462 – MEMORY WARE FLAT #29, 2001. Sotheby's, March 7, 2018.

== Contributions ==
- 2008 Life on Mars, the 2008 Carnegie International

== Publications ==
- Mike Kelley. (1999). Essays by Isabelle Graw, John C. Welchman and Anthony Vidler. Phaidon Press. ISBN 9780714838342.
- Heinz-Norbert Jocks. (2001). Dialoge: Kunst und Literatur: Mike Kelley im Gespräch. Cologne: DuMont. ISBN 3-7701-5096-1
- Foul Perfection. (2003). Essays and criticism, edited by John C. Welchman. M.I.T. Press. ISBN 9780262611787.
- Interviews, Conversations, and Chit-Chat (1986-2004). (2005). Interviews by Mike Kelley, edited by John C. Welchman. JRP Ringer. ISBN 9783905701005.
- Daniel Sherer. (2008). "Heidi on the Loos. Ornament and Crime in Mike Kelley and Paul McCarthy's Heidi." PIN-UP 3, 59–62. Reprinted in Y. Safran, ed. Adolf Loos Our Contemporary (New York: Columbia GSAPP, 2012).
- Educational Complex Onwards 1995-2008. (2009). Edited by Mike Kelley and Anne Pontegnie. JRP Ringer. ISBN 978-3-905829-80-8.
- Mike Kelley. (2013). Eva Meyer-Hermann, Ann Goldstein, Lisa Gabrielle Mark. Prestel. ISBN 978-3-7913-5241-1.
