= Hans Jóhannsson =

Icelandic violin maker

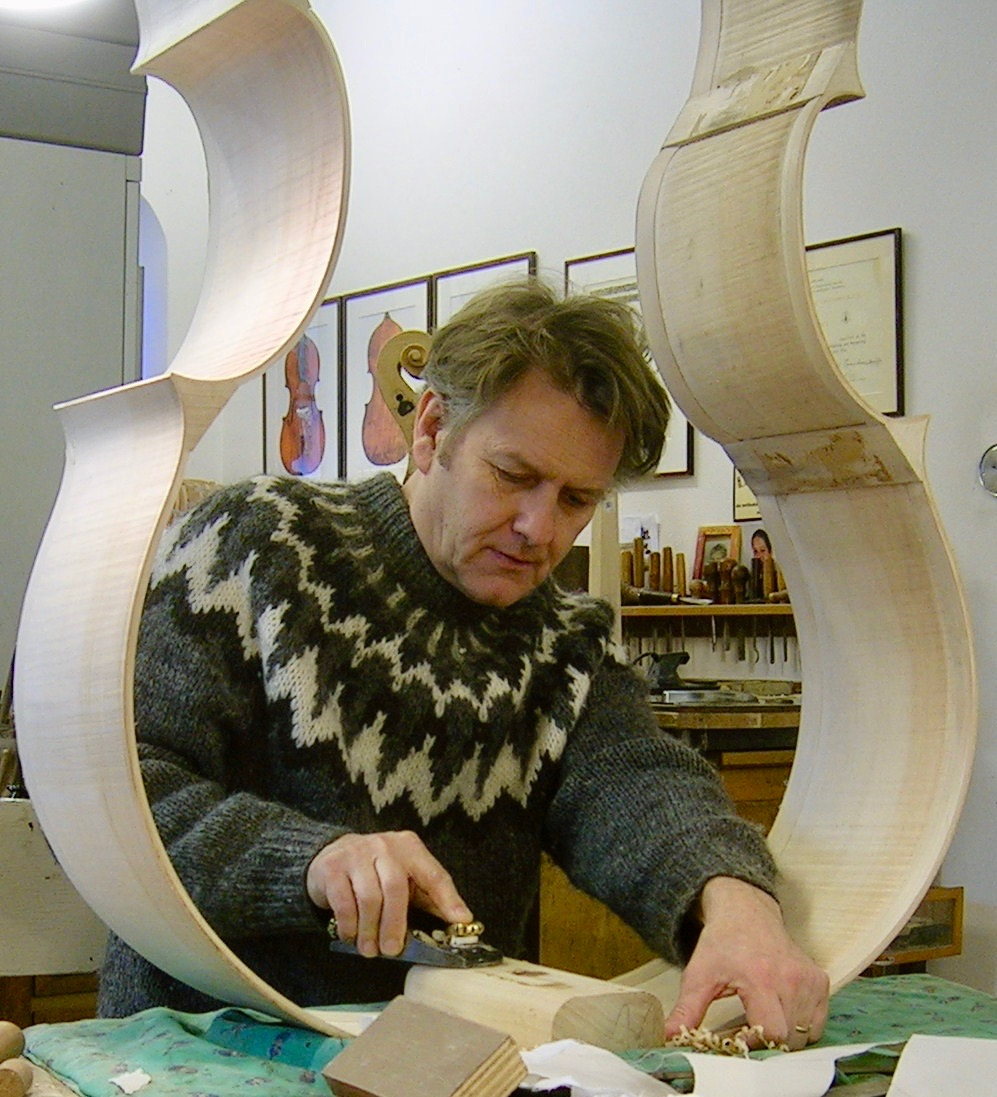

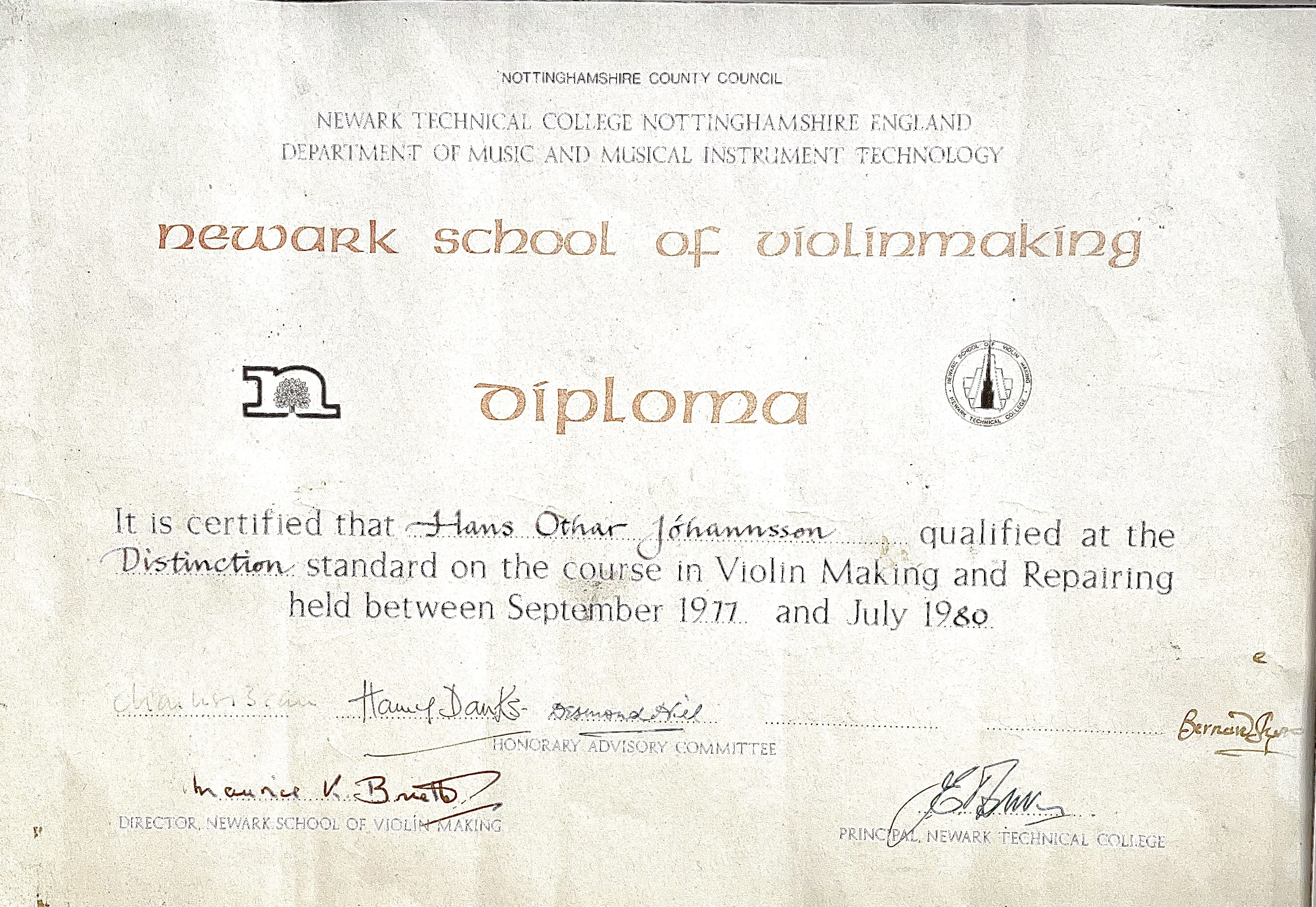
distinction

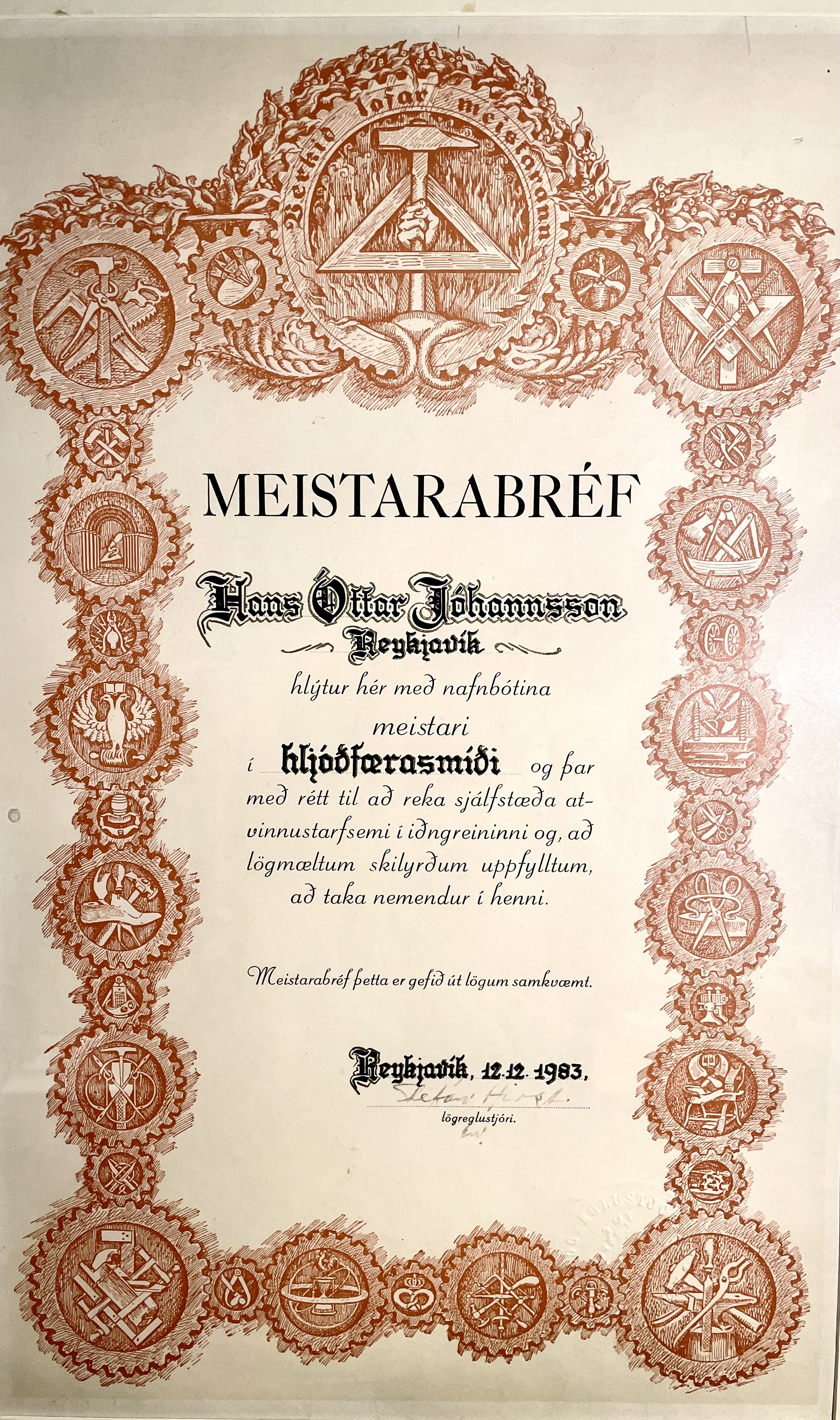
Meistarabref

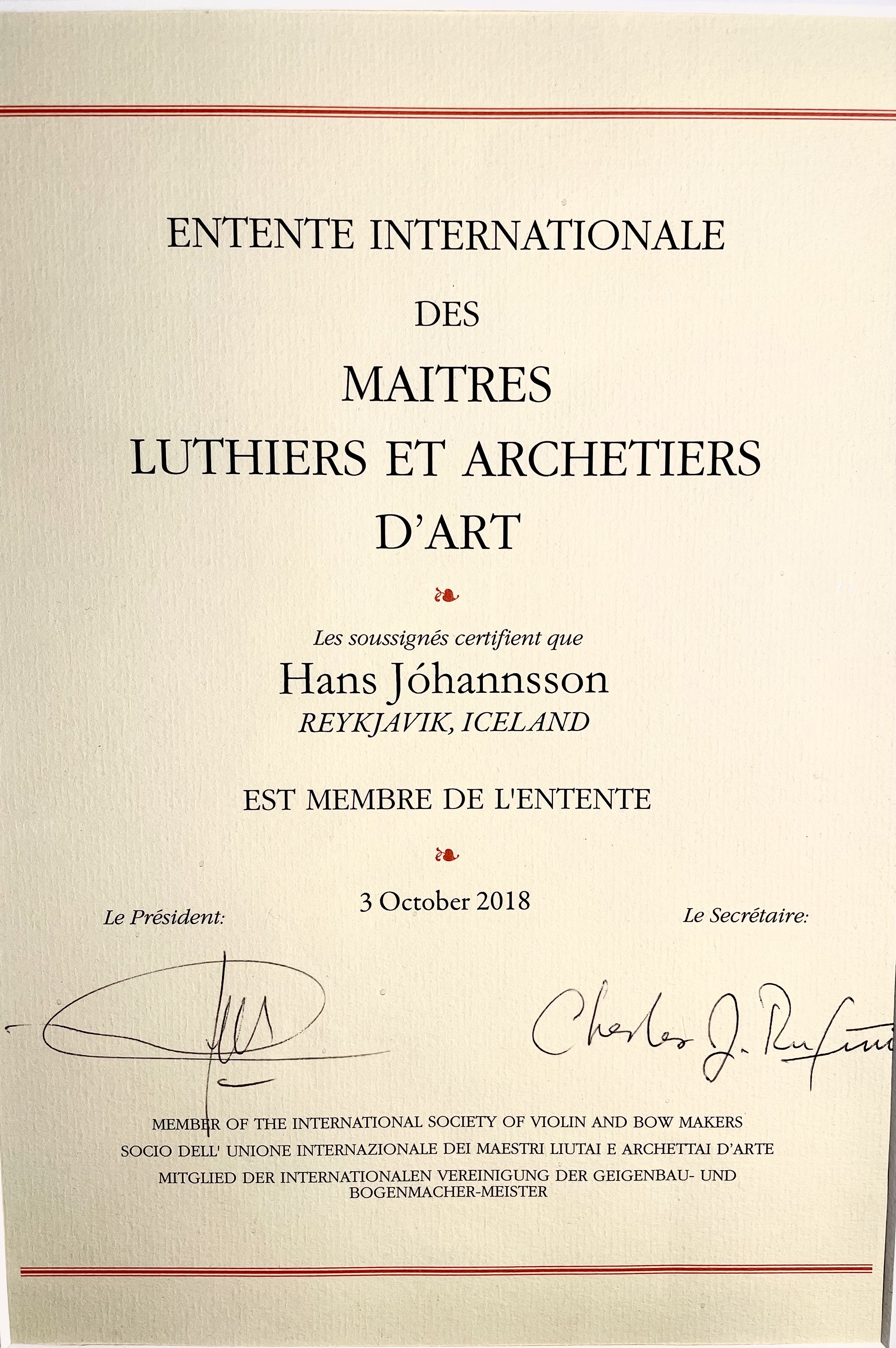
Entente

Hans Johannsson (born in Reykjavík, 1957) is a contemporary violin maker, most notable for his 21st century violin, which New York Times chose as one of the best ideas of the year. He makes violins, violas, cellos, double basses and various other stringed instruments. His passion for the violin started at an early age in the workshop of his grandfather Gudjon Halldorsson, a cabinet maker in Reykjavík, Iceland, where he began making musical instruments. He finished his studies at the Newark School of Violin Making in Great Britain with a diploma of distinction, under Maurice Bouette and Glen Collins in 1980. He subsequently received a masters diploma from the Icelandic Arts and crafts council in 1982. He has been making instruments for professional musicians in many countries. After 1982, Hans lived and worked with his family at the Chateau de Bourglinster in the Grand Duchy of Luxembourg, until 1993. He is a full member of the International Society of Violin and Bow Makers. David Fulton, the well known violin collector, is quoted as considering Hans Johannsson to be one of the best violin makers in the world today.

== Career ==
Hans has been making his instruments after his own model, designing all outlines and proportions on an ever evolving basic line. He has not made copies except in rare circumstances, as he believes that the great masters of earlier times all created their own distinctive style based on a classical theme, and that emulation is only practical when serving an educational purpose. Hans has made many experimental string instruments, both acoustic and electro-acoustic, and has studied the use of modern technologies such as Experimental Modal Analysis and FFT sound radiation measurements for his work on both classical conventional stringed instruments as well as prototype experimental electric bowed instruments.

In 1998 he played the main role in a 60-minute television documentary, The Violin Maker, focusing on his works, filmed at the Chateau de Bourglinster in the Grand Duchy of Luxembourg, featuring Sandrine Cantoreggi and Roby Lakatos. Produced with a grant from Eurimages for international distribution.

In 2003 he moderated and wrote the script for a BBC 3 radio documentary on technology and tradition in violinmaking.

In 2005–2007 he collaborated with Olafur Eliasson and Andreas Eggertsen on a 21st Century violin project, that imitate 17th and 18th century violins but look different. The resulting violin debuted in 2007 at the Serpentine Gallery, Hyde Park, London. New York Times chose the violin as one of the best ideas of the year.

Hans has collaborated with several musicians on custom instruments. In 2017 he collaborated with Úlfur Hansson. In 2013 he collaborated with Oscar-winner Hildur Guðnadóttir featuring experimental string instruments.

Since 2013 he has collaborated with Prof. Patrick Gaydecki of Signal Wizard systems, developing the use of impulse response measurements of classical instruments to emulate sound using digital signal processing. In a listening study the audience preferred the virtual violin, but the experts where still able to differentiate between the two.

On 15. October in 2023, an unprecedented event took place at the Harpa Concert Hall in Reykjavik, Iceland. Following a two week exhibit at Asmundarsalur, featuring more than 50 of Hans Johannsson´s instruments, a concert was held in which 27 of these violins, viola´s, cello´s and double basses were played. All of the instruments were made by Hans Johannsson between 1978 and 2021.

https://www.youtube.com/watch?v=EhF26dlwX8M&t=1043s

== Interviews ==
- Interview with Dr. Roger Kneebone.
- Interview, Rosin the Bow.
