= Educational Complex =

1995 artwork by Mike Kelley

- Artist: Mike Kelley
- Year: 1995
- Medium: Sculpture

Educational Complex is a 1995 artwork by Mike Kelley that recreates from imperfect memory every educational institution he attended as a connected architectural model. It is among his most famous works.
