= Little Sun (album) =

Studio album by Charlie Parr
- Released: March 22, 2024
- Length: 41:04
- Label: Smithsonian Folkways
- Producer: Tucker Martine

Charlie Parr chronology
Last of the Better Days Ahead (2021)	Little Sun (2024)

Little Sun is the eighteenth studio album by American country blues musician Charlie Parr. It was released on March 22, 2024, by Smithsonian Folkways Recordings.

== Background ==
On January 9, 2024, Parr announced the release of his eighteenth studio album, with producer Tucker Martine.

The first single "Boombox" was released alongside the album, The official music video was released on May 1, 2024.

== Critical reception ==
Professional ratings
Aggregate scores
Source	Rating
Metacritic	75/100
Review scores
Source	Rating
Narc Magazine	4/5 stars
PopMatters	6/10

Little Sun was met with "generally favorable" reviews from critics. At Metacritic, which assigns a weighted average rating out of 100 to reviews from mainstream publications, this release received an average score of 75, based on 6 reviews.

== Track listing ==
Little Sun track listing
No.	Title	Length
1.	"Portland Avenue"	4:30
2.	"Little Sun"	3:57
3.	"Bear Head Lake"	7:21
4.	"Boombox"	3:56
5.	"Pale Fire"	7:31
6.	"Ten Watt"	5:31
7.	"Stray"	4:40
8.	"Sloth"	3:39
