= Little Sun (organization) =

German nonprofit organization

- Trade name: Little Sun
- Company type: Nonprofit organization
- Founded: July 2012
- Founder: Olafur Eliasson and Frederik Ottesen
- Headquarters: Berlin, Germany
- Area served: Sub-Saharan Africa
- Products: Solar-powered LED lamps
- Website: littlesun.org

Little Sun is a nonprofit organization founded in 2012 to deliver affordable clean energy in Africa and inspire people to take climate action globally. It was established by the engineer Frederik Ottesen and the artist Olafur Eliasson.

In 2014, Little Sun was awarded a $5 million impact investment by Bloomberg Philanthropies.

== Impact ==
To date, Little Sun has provided clean power and light to over 3.2 million people in Sub-Saharan Africa, enabled 58 million additional study hours for children, saved households $150 million in expenses, and helped reduce CO_{2} emissions by 800,000 metric tons. By working with local entrepreneurs, Little Sun has also helped create thousands of local jobs, and generated profits for rural communities in Sub-Saharan Africa, particularly for women.

Little Sun works primarily in Burkina Faso, Ethiopia, Senegal, Rwanda, and Zambia, drawing on the expertise of in-country staff. Through partnerships with local organizations, Little Sun operates in Nigeria, Tanzania, Kenya, and South Africa. Little Sun has offices in New York, Berlin, Addis Ababa, and Lusaka.

== Solar Products ==
Little Sun sells solar devices to raise funds and make solar lights and chargers available to energy-impoverished rural communities in Africa. Their products include the Little Sun Original lamp, Little Sun Charge phone charger, and the Little Sun Diamond lamp.

== Culture Program ==
In 2021, Little Sun launched a culture program to engage artists to works about climate change. Its aim is to broaden the often data-driven climate conversation. Their first campaign, Reach for the Sun, comprised a 10 step digital guide to creating a solar powered world.

Their second project, Fast Forward, was a series of short films exploring artists' dreams for a regenerative world. Featuring over 300 contributors, the short films were made by artists from Ethiopia, Senegal, and the United States – some of the regions in which Little Sun operates. The Fast Forward film Possible World was screened at Times Square.
