= Richard Kuhlenschmidt Gallery =

Former art gallery in Los Angeles, California

The Richard Kuhlenschmidt Gallery was a contemporary art gallery originally located in Los Angeles, California, USA. It played an important part in setting the stage for Los Angeles' emergence as an international art center in the 1980s. It opened in 1982 and eventually closed in 1993 but it was preceded by Jancar Kuhlenschmidt Gallery that put down most of the ground work for what would follow.

== History ==
Tom Jancar and Richard Kuhlenschmidt opened Jancar Kuhlenschmidt Gallery in 1980. The Jancar Kuhlenschmidt Gallery was located in the basement of the historic Los Altos Apartments on Wilshire Boulevard in Los Angeles. The gallery measured 8’ x 14’. The gallery was responsible for showing Los Angeles artists David Askevold, William Leavitt, and Christopher Williams (artist) as well as NY artists Louise Lawler and Richard Prince who are part of the Pictures Generation artists. Jancar Kuhlenschmidt Gallery closed in 1982.

Richard Kuhlenschmidt Gallery began in 1982 and continued to focus on the Pictures Generation, most of these artists contacts were introduced during the Jancar Kuhlenschmidt Gallery period, they are as follows Sherrie Levine, James Welling, Matt Mullican, Allan McCollum and James Casebere in addition to Douglas Huebler, one of the pioneers of conceptual art.

Known for showing "art that was very difficult to sell", Kuhlenschmidt's gallery was described at the time as "the only gallery in Los Angeles devoted to showing artists who are principally influenced by intellectual and conceptual concerns."

In 1985, Kuhlenschmidt sponsored a benefit exhibition for AIDS Project Los Angeles (APLA) in tribute to friend and colleague Joe Bishop, a prominent writer and critic, whose death from AIDS had recently rocked the art world. The “Joe Bishop AIDS Benefit” exhibition included work by John Baldessari, Ross Bleckner, Robert Longo, David Salle, Cindy Sherman and Eric Fischl.

Kuhlenschmidt moved his gallery to Santa Monica in 1988 as that city became a magnet for the burgeoning local art scene.

In 1990, the gallery featured a major overview of works by the Viennese architectural firm, Coop Himmelb(l)au, which included a symposium “Welcome to the Millenium: Architecture Strikes Back” that included Wolf Prix of Coop Himmelblau, as well as notable Los Angeles architects Thom Mayne, Michael Rotondi and Eric Moss. The symposium was moderated by architect Christian Hubert and included architectural critics Aaron Betsky and Leon Whiteson.

When the recession hit in 1991, Kuhlenschmidt reduced the size of his gallery from 4,000 square feet to 1,700. The gallery closed its doors in 1993.

The gallery’s archives are currently stored in the Smithsonian Archives of American Art.

== Artists ==
Significant artists previously represented by the Richard Kuhlenschmidt Gallery include:

- Cindy Bernard
- Barbara Bloom (artist)
- Douglas Huebler
- Louise Lawler
- William Leavitt
- Sherrie Levine
- Allan McCollum
- Matt Mullican
- Richard Prince
- James Welling
- Robin Winters
