= Thomas Lawson (artist) =

Scottish artist

- Born: 1951 (age 74–75); Glasgow, Scotland
- Education: CUNY Graduate Center, University of Edinburgh, University of St Andrews
- Known for: Painting, public art
- Movement: Postmodernism, The Pictures Generation
- Spouse: Susan Morgan
- Awards: John Simon Guggenheim Fellowship, National Endowment for the Arts, Rockefeller Foundation

Thomas Lawson (born 1951, Glasgow, Scotland) is an artist, writer, editor, and from 1991 to 2022 was the Dean of the School of Art & Design at California Institute of the Arts. He emerged as a central figure in ideological debates at the turn of the 1980s about the viability of painting through critical essays, such as "Last Exit: Painting" (1981). He has been described as "an embedded correspondent [and] polemical editorialist" who articulated an oppositional, progressive position for representational painting from within an increasingly reactionary art and media environment. Artforum called his approach to the medium "one of the most cogent and controversial" in the 80s.

Thomas Lawson, Don't Hit Her Again, oil on canvas, 48" x 48", 1981, Private collection

Lawson has received awards from the John S. Guggenheim Foundation, National Endowment for the Arts and Rockefeller Foundation.

His paintings have been exhibited internationally at galleries and museums including Metro Pictures (New York), Anthony Reynolds (London), the Hammer Museum (Los Angeles), and Le Magasin (Grenoble). He work was featured in the Metropolitan Museum of Art exhibition, "The Pictures Generation" (2009), and "A Forest of Signs: Art in the Crisis of Representation" (1989) at Museum of Contemporary Art, Los Angeles (MoCA). He has also created temporary public works in New York City, Glasgow, and Newcastle upon Tyne.

Lawson's essays have appeared in numerous anthologies and journals such as Artforum, Art in America, Flash Art and October; an anthology of his writing, Mining for Gold, was published in 2004. He has also edited or co-edited the contemporary art journals REALLIFE Magazine, Afterall and East of Borneo. Lawson currently lives and works in Los Angeles and Edinburgh, Scotland.

== Early life and career ==
Lawson grew up in Glasgow and developed an early interest in the language of painting. As a teenager, he took classes at the Glasgow School of Art, but found it too conservative and enrolled at the University of St Andrews, where he studied English Language and Literature (graduated, 1973). He was active in the art scene there, creating an art club and organizing an exhibition of Scottish painter Pat Douthwaite. After enrolling in the Art History graduate program at the University of Edinburgh, he traveled to New York to interview Jasper Johns for his thesis, before graduating in 1975.

Lawson next moved to New York and enrolled in the Art History and Criticism PhD program at CUNY Graduate Center, where he studied with Rosalind Krauss, Linda Nochlin and Robert Pincus-Witten, and alongside postmodern writers Douglas Crimp and Craig Owens. He arrived ahead of the convergence of a flourishing downtown art/punk scene, new critical-artistic practices such as appropriation, brewing ideological debates, and an art-market explosion. While at CUNY, Lawson began exhibiting art at Artists Space (1977, 1979) and the Drawing Center (1978). He also co-founded REALLIFE Magazine in 1978 with his wife, writer Susan Morgan, and contributed essays to Artforum, Art in America and Flash Art. In 1981, he began showing at the newly opened, influential Metro Pictures with artists such as Robert Longo and Cindy Sherman, and later in the decade, showed at the Richard Kuhlenschmidt Gallery in Los Angeles. Surveys of Lawson's work have since been held at the Museum of Contemporary Art San Diego, the Centre for Contemporary Arts (Glasgow), the Battersea Arts Centre (London), and Goss-Michael Foundation (Dallas). He is currently represented by David Kordansky Gallery in Los Angeles. In 1991, Lawson was appointed Dean of the School of Art at California Institute of the Arts (CalArts), a post he held until 2022. In addition to teaching, Lawson has curated or co-curated shows and lecture series at MoCA, PS1, Artists Space, White Columns, the Renaissance Society, LACE, REDCAT Gallery, and Los Angeles Municipal Gallery.

== Work and reception ==
Lawson is arguably better known for his critical writing and tenure as Dean at CalArts than for his painting. However, critics in the 2000s, such as Andrew Berardini, began suggesting that his painting was due for a reassessment for its role in broadening the parameters of appropriated imagery and offering a nuanced, critical alternative to conceptual art and neo-expressionist painting in the 1980s.

His career is best understood in its entirety, with his complementary practices of artmaking, critical writing, magazine editing, curating, and educating collectively addressing key ideological debates of the time.

=== "The painting wars" (1977–1987) ===
Lawson emerged in the late 1970s as part of "The Pictures Generation" artists, which included Sherrie Levine, Robert Longo and David Salle, among many. Their work was broadly unified by its critique of modernism's avant-garde myths and embrace of postmodern art-making strategies, media imagery, pop-culture references and simple, sometimes crude, technique and presentation. This approach was bolstered by critical writing from Douglas Crimp, Craig Owens, Hal Foster, and Lawson, who in Artforum, Flash Art and REALLIFE called for art that deconstructed dominant media and cultural representations in the face of what he termed "a growing lack of faith in the ability of artists to continue as anything more than plagiaristic stylists." In "Last Exit: Painting" (1981), Lawson championed appropriationist painting as "the perfect camouflage" (due to its very unlikeliness) to infiltrate the art-world and expose stereotypes and conventions, maintaining that the work's hand-made subjectivity and expressive tools tempered its ironic and detached tone. Crimp (and the others) denounced contemporary painting's "reactionary expressionism" as fatally compromised; they favored photographic work, like that of Richard Prince or Cindy Sherman. Lawson argued such work was too declarative, obvious, and likely to lapse into a "bureaucratic continuation" of Conceptualism that would be marginalized in esoteric, avant-garde ghettoes outside the mainstream.

Thomas Lawson, Temple of the Kultur Kritik, oil on canvas, 72" x 72", 1985, La Caixa Collection Contemporary Art, Barcelona

Lawson's own early work was situated at the crux of photography and painting, and combined deadpan, crudely modeled media archetypes (representing family, passion, violence and national iconography), which he isolated on modern, painterly fields of gestural marks or monochromatic grounds. Decontextualizing overused painting techniques and snapshots drawn from tabloid stories, he sought to reconstitute and question their lost meaning and to expose the hollowness and insensitivity of conditioned responses to spectacle and tragedy. Critics variously described his work (e.g., Don’t Hit Her Again or Shot for a Bike, both 1981) as haunted and difficult to like but worthy, and "hard-headed and thoughtful [...] with a punk rock and painterly awareness." Holland Cotter deemed it "painting out on strike," with an "obdurate, stonewalling quality that read like provocation"; others, such as Carrie Rickey, found the ambiguity of the work's intention to be troubling.

In 1983, Lawson began using photographic images of classical architecture and mountain landscapes that connoted institutionalized culture, power and mysticism, which he obscured with veils of painterly, scumbled brushstrokes (and later, dots, pills and paisleys). Reviewers generally placed works such as Metropolis: The Museum (1983) or The Temple of the Kultur Critic (1984), among Lawson's most alluring, but differed on their political efficacy. Ronald Jones wrote that Lawson successfully subverted cultural expressions of authority, "prov[ing] them too slight to thrive outside their incubated logic." Eleanor Heartney, however, considered the architectural images less resistant to the seductions of the painting surfaces than earlier romantic imagery, as did Donald Kuspit, who felt the critique was vulnerable to absorption by the dominant culture. In his 1987 show, "The Party's Over," his imagery and presentation, if not his intent, became more polymorphous. In paintings and an installation, he mixed expressions of freedom, waste and excess—aerial views of freeways, liquor-ad-like splashes, corporate urbanism and celebrity—with violent overlays of bright, exaggerated Expressionist brushstrokes and paint blobs to self-critically reveal them as empty gestures of power and unmediated artistic angst, petrified into formula.

Thomas Lawson, Portrait of New York (detail), industrial sign paint on plywood, 1989/1991. Originally installed at Manhattan Municipal Building (now David Dinkins Municipal Building) New York City, NY. Collection New York Department of Cultural Affairs

=== Public Art (1987–1996) ===
In his 1986 Artforum essay, "Toward another Laocoön," Lawson signaled a practical and theoretical shift in his work and the broader art-world toward straightforward, confrontational public and political practices in the wake of Reaganism and the AIDS crisis: "These are difficult times for artists with the ambition of reformulating the cultural identity of the society. The idea of an avant-garde of any kind is clearly no longer useful… There is a need to rethink the purpose of art, its value in noncash terms." Over the next decade, he turned to a meta-critical dissection of public monuments and architecture and the values and processes of power inscribed within them. His essay "Going Public" (1990) identifies the shift from privileged, private art gallery spaces to the more inclusive, interactive space of the city in the political, combative work of Jenny Holzer, Barbara Kruger and Group Material as part of a "widespread effort to recast art production as an activity of social meaning." Lawson deemed the move essential to avoiding the co-optation that rendered political art in galleries "nothing more than the ineffectual bleating of an elite whose job it is to show the human face of entrenched power."

Lawson's own art extended beyond the canvas first to installation and then into public space with Civic Virtue/Civic Rights (1988), a temporary work in City Hall Park in New York. It was the first of several public works that examined traditional public sculpture and its relationship to dominant power structures by translating such representations into other contexts. For the five-year commission, A Portrait of New York (1989), he covered a one-third mile length of scaffolding parapet during renovation of the city's Municipal Building with bright blue and orange, casually rendered imagery drawn from local civic statuary, redressing the short shrift given women and minorities in public sculpture by shuffling their images with those of monumentalized historical figures such as Alexander Hamilton, Nathan Hale and Al Smith. In 1990, he created Memory Lingers Here for the First Tyne International Exhibition in Newcastle upon Tyne, England, a 30-billboard installation that enveloped a derelict soap factory. The work used imagery of St. George and the Dragon taken from a neglected, local war memorial in Old Eldon Square to comment on regional identity, memory, and the loss of place and social cohesion. Some of Lawson's other public art-related projects include billboards in New Haven, Connecticut (1988) and Bellgrove Station, Glasgow (1990), and Fallen Angels (1991), an installation based on local statuary imagery and created for the socially committed Circulo de Bellas Artes show, "El Sueño Imperative," in Madrid.

Thomas Lawson, Confrontation: Three Graces, oil on canvas, 72" x 84", 2010, Private Collection

=== Return to painting (1995– ) ===
Lawson returned to painting in the second half of the 1990s and has continued to engage the question of the medium's viability as an artist, educator, and writer. In his own work, Lawson has extended his strategy of exploiting the contrast between the expectations of medium (painting) and message to explore concerns from geopolitics to self-representation on social media. These later bodies of work are characterized by a greater use of juxtaposition, fragmentation and humor, and incorporate disparate painterly techniques, pictorial conventions and imagery in a sometimes dizzying mix that critics have described, variously, as ranging from "calm, collected and sinister" to "visually disabling."

In his 1995 show, "Viennese Paintings," Lawson explored madness by juxtaposing stark, claustrophobic institutional rooms, disquieting images drawn from building facades, fountains and asylums in Vienna, and references to Freud and early modernism on diptychs rendered at topsy-turvy angles in brilliant colors. His LAXART show, "History/Painting" (2007), probed geopolitical, environmental and economic instability through images of non-Western world maps and views of the globe, political leaders (e.g., Dogs of War, 2006) and victims of beheadings from news and art history, painted with discordant colors and expressive techniques suggesting Max Beckmann, Emil Nolde or George Grosz. In shows between 2009 and 2015, works such as Confrontation: Three Graces (2010) edged closer to painting's decorative potential and investigated the allegorical possibilities of the human figure, questions of desire and attraction, and the pictorial rhetoric of self-representation. Artforum’s Travis Diehl described similar works, such as Theoretical Picture or Voluptuous Panic (both 2012), as crossbreeding and suturing "huge chunks of culture" through jarring juxtapositions of painterly techniques, and "a weirdly savaged classicism" of truncated and silhouetted fragments from myths, statuary and contemporary media. Reviewers described Lawson's 2015 show at Klaus von Nichtssagend Gallery as uncanny work that defied categorization and encouraged viewers "to shed their biases and re-engage with wild beauty."

== Writing ==
Lawson gained recognition for his early writing as "a master of the terse epigram" and a relentless, acerbic critic of the dominant authorities of the era; in 2001, Artforum editor Jack Bankowsky described it as "unusually vivid" frontline reporting. In later interviews, he has noted a shift in his thought away from the combative polemicism and world-historical framework of the 1980s, toward advocating work that is grounded in a specific culture or community without giving weight to any medium. Lawson's writing has appeared in journals including Artforum, Art in America, Flash Art, frieze and October as well as in exhibition catalogues for artists including Sarah Charlesworth, Liz Glynn, Gary Hume, Laura Owens and Steven Prina, among many. Several of his essays, including "Last Exit: Painting" "Spies and Watchmen," and "The Future is Certain," have been anthologized extensively, and he co-edited the anthology, Modern Dreams: The Rise and Fall and Rise of Pop (1988). Mining for Gold (JRP/Ringier, 2004), a collection of his writing, was listed among frieze's "Best Books 2005" and the writing noted for its role in critical discourses that have "informed successive generations of younger artists." Lawson also wrote a two-act play based on the sedition trial of the Scottish radical Thomas Muir, titled The Pest of Scotland, or, A Tocsin Sounds in Embro (2001). In 2015, he contributed to Akademie X: Lessons in Art + Life, an anthology offering lessons, practical advice, ideological perspectives and assignments on contemporary art to students from artists across the globe.

== Magazine editing ==
Lawson has edited contemporary art publications for over three decades. In 1978, he and Susan Morgan co-founded REALLIFE Magazine, which they published and edited through twenty-three issues until 1992. REALLIFE featured written and visual material by and about young artists and served as a clearing house for new ideas and examinations of mass media and art, while chronicling New York's developing postmodern alternative art scene; critic Carrie Rickey identified it as the "house organ" of the Pictures Generation. In addition to Lawson and Morgan, REALLIFE contributors included Eric Bogosian, Jennifer Bolande, Barbara Kruger, Félix Gonzáles-Torres, Kim Gordon, Craig Owens, Richard Prince, David Robbins, Laurie Simmons, and Lawrence Weiner, among many. In 2007, an anthology of the magazine's history, REALLIFE Magazine: Selected Writings and Projects, 1979–1994, was published. Between 2002 and 2009, Lawson co-edited the contemporary art journal Afterall, which published as a joint venture of Central St Martins School of Art, London, and CalArts. In 2010, he founded the online art publication East of Borneo and has served as editor-in-chief since. East of Borneo focuses on contemporary art and its history as considered from Los Angeles and publishes essays and interviews alongside a multimedia archive of images, videos, texts, and sounds.

== Academic career ==
Appointed in 1991, Lawson served as Dean of the School of Art & Design at California Institute of the Arts (CalArts) in Los Angeles for thirty years, until 2022. In his writing and interviews, Lawson has stressed the importance of an art school having a "clear understanding of its own, historically driven account of what is important." His teaching emphasized CalArts’ founding intellectual tradition of contesting conventional ideas, questioning the means and ideology of representation, and teaching no medium in advance of ideas, while still rooting practice in the visual. Thus, despite CalArts’ reputation as a place where painting had to justify itself, art writers note that Lawson mentored a generation of painters there including Ingrid Calame, Laura Owens, and Monique Prieto.

Prior to becoming Dean at CalArts, Lawson did not maintain long-term appointments in academia, nor was he is known for a deep pedagogical practice or research. He was a Visiting Faculty member for a semester at CalArts in both 1990 and 1987, and was a part-time Instructor in New York both at the School of Visual Arts between 1981 and 1990 and the New York Studio Program between 1987 and 1989, and was also twice a Visiting Critic at Rhode Island School of Art and Design in academic years 1988–89 and 1983–84.

== Awards and recognition ==
Lawson has received fellowships from the John Simon Guggenheim Memorial Foundation (2009), Lewis Walpole Library (2002), Visual Art Projects, Glasgow (1999), and the National Endowment for the Arts (1989, 1985 1982); an Art Matters Foundation Grant (1986); residency awards from the Ucross Foundation, Wyoming (2003) and Rockefeller Foundation, Bellagio Center (1997); and funding for REAL LIFE Magazine from the NEA, Visual Artists Forums and NYSCA Visual Arts (1979–91).
