= REALLIFE Magazine =

New York City-based arts magazine

- REALLIFE Magazine, first issue, March 1979. Artwork by Sherrie Levine.
- Editor: Thomas Lawson and Susan Morgan
- Categories: Visual art
- First issue: March 1979
- Final issue: 1994
- Country: United States
- Based in: New York City, New York
- Language: English

REALLIFE Magazine was a publication featuring written and visual material by and about young artists. It was co-founded and published by artist Thomas Lawson and writer Susan Morgan between 1979 and 1994. It served as a clearing house for new ideas and examinations of mass media and art, while chronicling New York's developing postmodern alternative art scene. It was strongly associated with The Pictures Generation group of artists.

== Magazine ==
The magazine's first issue was made possible by a National Endowment for the Arts grant in art criticism, awarded to Lawson through Artists Space (New York). REALLIFE Magazine was based in New York and attentively addressed current art and its influences while continuously speculating about culture and questioning politics. Starting with a focus on the 'Pictures' artists - and an affinity with the world of TV, film, and popular culture - the magazine charted the rise of the postmodernism and postfeminist debates before moving into more political issues, from institutional critique and hypertext to AIDS and the civil war in El Salvador. As the 1980s unraveled, and priorities and interests shifted in the art world, the magazine remained a forum for artists' opinions, providing exposure for those overlooked by the mainstream, and introducing the work of a new generation of practitioners. The wide range of featured artists included Sherrie Levine, Félix González-Torres, Mike Kelley, Dan Graham, Louise Lawler, Joseph Nechvatal, Matt Mullican, Jeff Wall, David Hammons and Critical Art Ensemble, among others.

== Exhibition ==
In March 2007, Artists Space hosted the exhibition. Curated by Kate Fowle, the show looked at the 80s decade through the lens of this publication and its roster of contributors, including Richard Baim, Eric Bogosian, Glenn Branca, Critical Art Ensemble, Jamie Davidovich, Jessica Diamond, Mark Dion and Jason Simon, Jack Goldstein, Kim Gordon, Group Material, Hammons, Michael Hurson, Ray Johnson, Kelley, Barbara Kruger, Lawler, Levine, Sol LeWitt, Robert Longo, Ken Lum, Allan McCollum, Paul McMahon, Mullican, Adrian Piper, Richard Prince, David Robbins, Cindy Sherman, Michael Smith and James Welling.

== Book ==
The exhibition coincided with the publication REALLIFE Magazine: Selected Writings and Projects 1979-1994, edited by Miriam Katzeff and published by Primary Information (NY, 2007). With an introduction by Matthew Higgs, the anthology features writings and projects by Doug Ashford, Jo Baer and Bruce Robbins, Judith Barry, Dara Birnbaum, Joseph Bishop, Bogosian, Jennifer Bolande, Derek Boshier, Jim Bradley, Elsa Bulgari, Rhys Chatham, Dion, Spencer Finch, González-Torres, Gordon, Graham, Group Material, B.P. Gutfreund, The Holy Ghost Writers, Kellie Jones, Judith Kirshner, Kruger, Lawler, Lawson, Christine N. Lea, Levine, McCollum, McMahon, John Miller, Robert C. Morgan, Susan Morgan, David A. Muller, Mullican, Kathi Norklun, Piper, Richard Prince, Rex Reason, David Robbins, Walter Robinson, John Robert, Tim Rollins and K.O.S., Ed Ruscha, Fulton Ryder, Grahame Shane, Sherman, Laurie Simmons, Howard Singerman, Smith and R. Sikoryak, Jana Sterbak, Josef Strau and Stephan Dillemuth, John Stezaker, Valentin Tatransky, Bernard Tschumi, John A. Walker, Wall, Joan Wallace and Geralyn Donohue, Welling, and Robin Winters.
