= Tom Jancar =

Art dealer

Thomas John Jancar (born November 9, 1950, Pasadena, CA), Contemporary Art Dealer - Jancar Kuhlenschmidt Gallery (1980-1982) and Jancar Gallery (2006-2016) located in Los Angeles, CA.

Jancar is the only son of Mildred Emeline (née Olson, 1915–2006) and Arnost Jancar (1921-1976). His father was of Czech, Moravian and Czech Silesian ancestry. Jancar's father was born in Butte, Montana. Jancar's father's parents were both immigrants. Jancar's mother, who was of Norwegian, Swedish, Danish and Irish Ulster descent, was born in Maskell, Nebraska. Jancar's mother's parents were the children of Dakota Territory pioneers.

He attended Estancia High School, in Costa Mesa, California .

Jancar studied Art History (BA 1974 - University of California, Irvine) and Studio Art (MFA 1976 - University of California, Irvine). During his graduate studies at University of California, Irvine, Jancar was the teaching assistant to Bas Jan Ader and assisted Ader in the creation of his work "Primary Time" (1974), photographs and video.

Jancar is an ecumenical Christian.

== History ==
In 1980 Tom Jancar opened his first gallery with partner Richard Kuhlenschmidt named Jancar Kuhlenschmidt Gallery located at 4121 Wilshire Blvd, Los Angeles in the Los Altos Apartments building. In 2006 he again opened a new gallery named Jancar Gallery. This gallery was located on the top floor of an art deco high-rise building at 3875 Wilshire Blvd, Los Angeles and in 2008 he left this location and moved Jancar Gallery to 961 Chung King Road, Los Angeles. He hosted exhibitions of established, mid-career and emerging artists from Los Angeles, New York and Europe, many of whom were women. In 2011 arts writer Catherine Wagley named him the best down to earth gallerist.

Some of the artists that Tom Jancar showed at Jancar Kuhlenschmidt Gallery in the 1980s include Louise Lawler, William Leavitt (artist), Richard Prince, David Askevold, David Amico, and Christopher Williams (artist). At Jancar Gallery some of the artists shown include John Baldessari, Robert H. Cumming, Harriet Korman, Derek Boshier, Betty Tompkins, Judy Chicago, Suzanne Lacy, Micol Hebron, Hildegarde Duane, Catherine Lord, Rena Small, Annie Sprinkle, Tricia Avant, Susan Mogul, Richard Newton, Elana Mann, Christian Cummings, Judith Linhares, Katia Santibañez, Martha Alf, Andrea Bowers, Roger Herman, Melissa Meyer, Cyril Kuhn, Dorit Cypis, Hubert Schmalix, Natalia LL, Kathrin Burmester, Martha Wilson, Stacy Kranitz, Angela Ellsworth, Jasmine Little, Bobbie Oliver, LeRoy Stevens, Doug Harvey (artist) and Ilene Segalove.

The Jancar Gallery records are held in the Smithsonian Institution's Archives of American Art.
