= Jančar =

Jančar is a surname. Notable people with the surname include:

- Drago Jančar (born 1948), Slovenian writer, playwright, and essayist
- Lizika Jančar (1919–1943), Slovene partisan
- Tom Jancar (born 1950), American contemporary art dealer

== See also ==
- Jancar Kuhlenschmidt Gallery, a contemporary art gallery in Los Angeles, California
