= Los Altos Apartments =

- U.S. National Register of Historic Places
- Los Angeles Historic-Cultural Monument
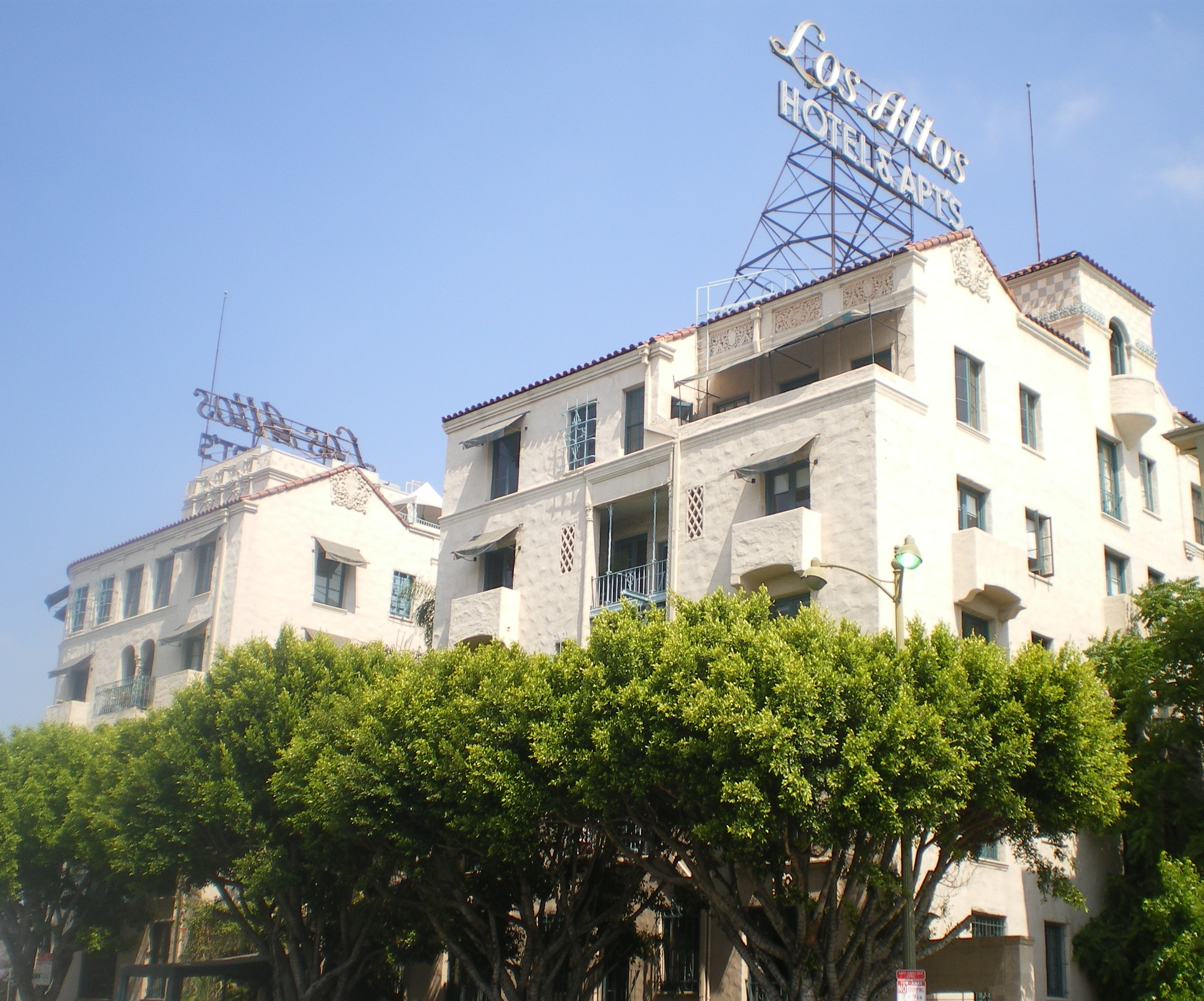
- Los Altos Apartments, May 2008

- Location within the Los Angeles metropolitan area Location within California Location within the United States
- Location: 4121 Wilshire Boulevard, Los Angeles, California 90010
- Coordinates: 34°3′43.4118″N 118°19′2.9202″W
- Built: 1925
- Architect: Rust, Edward B.; Mayo, Luther
- Architectural style: Mission/Spanish Revival
- NRHP reference No.: 99000765
- LAHCM No.: 311

Significant dates
- Added to NRHP: July 1, 1999
- Designated LAHCM: 1986-10-17

The Los Altos Apartments is a Mission Revival-style apartment building on Wilshire Boulevard in Los Angeles, California, United States.

== History ==
Los Altos was built in 1925 and designed by Edward B. Rust and Luther Mayo. In 1999, it was listed on the National Register of Historic Places. The Spanish Colonial building began as Los Angeles' first co-op, including a 3300 square foot, two-story suite for William Randolph Hearst and Marion Davies as their city flat.

After the co-op went bankrupt during the Great Depression, Los Altos Hotel and Apartments became luxury housing for short- and long-term tenants, including Hollywood legends like Clara Bow, Bette Davis, Mae West, Douglas Fairbanks, Ava Gardner, and Judy Garland.

Over the years the building fell into disrepair and was purchased in 1977 by Thomas Stegan who hired historical architect Raymond Girvigian to oversee asbestos removal, seismic retrofitting and cosmetic restoration.

In the 1980s the building became a magnet for a bohemian list of residents. Jeff Ayeroff, who went on to co-found Virgin Records America and the Work Group, lived in the building as did screenwriter Becky Johnston while she wrote the scripts "Under the Cherry Moon" for Prince and "The Prince of Tides" for Barbra Streisand. Artists Nancy Reese, Phil Garner, Eric Blum and Tom Shannon all rented living quarters and art dealers Tom Jancar and Richard Kuhlenschmidt opened the Jancar Kuhlenschmidt Gallery in the basement of the building. New York hotshots Richard Prince and Louise Lawler had their first L.A. exhibitions there. Actor Frederic Forrest was living at the Los Altos when he turned in his critically acclaimed performance in Francis Ford Coppola's 1988 film Tucker: The Man and His Dream, as did musician Tommy Gear, who was a founding member of revered L.A. punk group The Screamers.

Again, bankruptcy stopped renovations and Stagen stopped work in 1990. Tenants gradually left and Los Altos remained mostly empty because of a city-issued citation barring new tenants until the building could be brought up to the seismic code.

The virtually deserted building had become a popular site for film productions seeking iconic Los Angeles settings.The city was planning to demolish Los Altos until 1996 when construction lawyer Larry Silverton and his partner Stephen Frankel bought it for restoration. Silverton discovered the building when it was used for a Playboy Playmate video shoot. Their company Dakota Investment reunited the apartment building with its historic 1920s parking garage that had been split off after WW II and did the seismic retrofitting that allowed Los Altos Apartments to have tenants again.

With renovations underway, in 1997 Silverton sold the building to nonprofit Neighborhood Efforts' Allen Gross and Arax Harutunian because they could apply for government grants and raise money from private sources for a more faithful restoration of the historic building.

The restoration was helmed by the Los Angeles-based architectural firm M2A who rehabilitated the 75-unit structure, and restored its original decor. The firm restored or recreated Los Altos' original light fixtures, hardware, carpets, plaster work, awnings, and ornamental iron work. The rehabilitation "successfully transformed the property from a vacant, blighted, graffiti-infested building into a healthy, mixed-income building serving the very low income population as well as the market population." Today, Los Altos is once again home to artists, screenwriters, and actors, among other tenants.

In 1999, Los Altos received several preservation design awards from the California Preservation Foundation and the Los Angeles Conservancy. The landmark also received a Historic Preservation Award of Excellence from the city of Los Angeles.

== Popular culture ==
The television series Angel prominently featured exterior shots of the Los Altos Apartments in seasons 2–4. It acted as the exterior of the Hyperion Hotel, the home and base of titular character and his friends. The Los Altos Apartments building was also featured in a season 1 episode of Angel titled "I Fall to Pieces", where it was used as both exterior and interior for the apartment building of a guest character.

In the fifth episode of the second season of the television series Numbers, titled "Assassin", the building was used as the exterior of the Rancho Verde Assisted Living building.

In the Amazon series Transparent, the character Ali lives in the Los Altos Apartments; several exteriors, including scenes in the courtyard entry, are featured in seasons 1 and 2.

In the Netflix limited series Brand New Cherry Flavor, main character Lisa Nova lives in the Los Altos Apartments, and the exteriors and sign are prominently featured throughout the series.

In Steven Paul Leiva's 2022 novel, The Reluctant Heterosexual: A Tragicomedy in Four Movements A Prelude and An Interlude, the Los Altos is the first home of the parents of the novel's protagonist, Robert Leslie Cromwell.

The location was also used in the 2014 remake of The Gambler, where Jim Bennett’s (Mark Wahlberg) student and love interest, Amy Phillips (Brie Larson), resides. The exterior and signage are prominently shown in several scenes of the film.

== See also ==
- National Register of Historic Places listings in Los Angeles
- List of Los Angeles Historic-Cultural Monuments in the Wilshire and Westlake areas

== Gallery ==
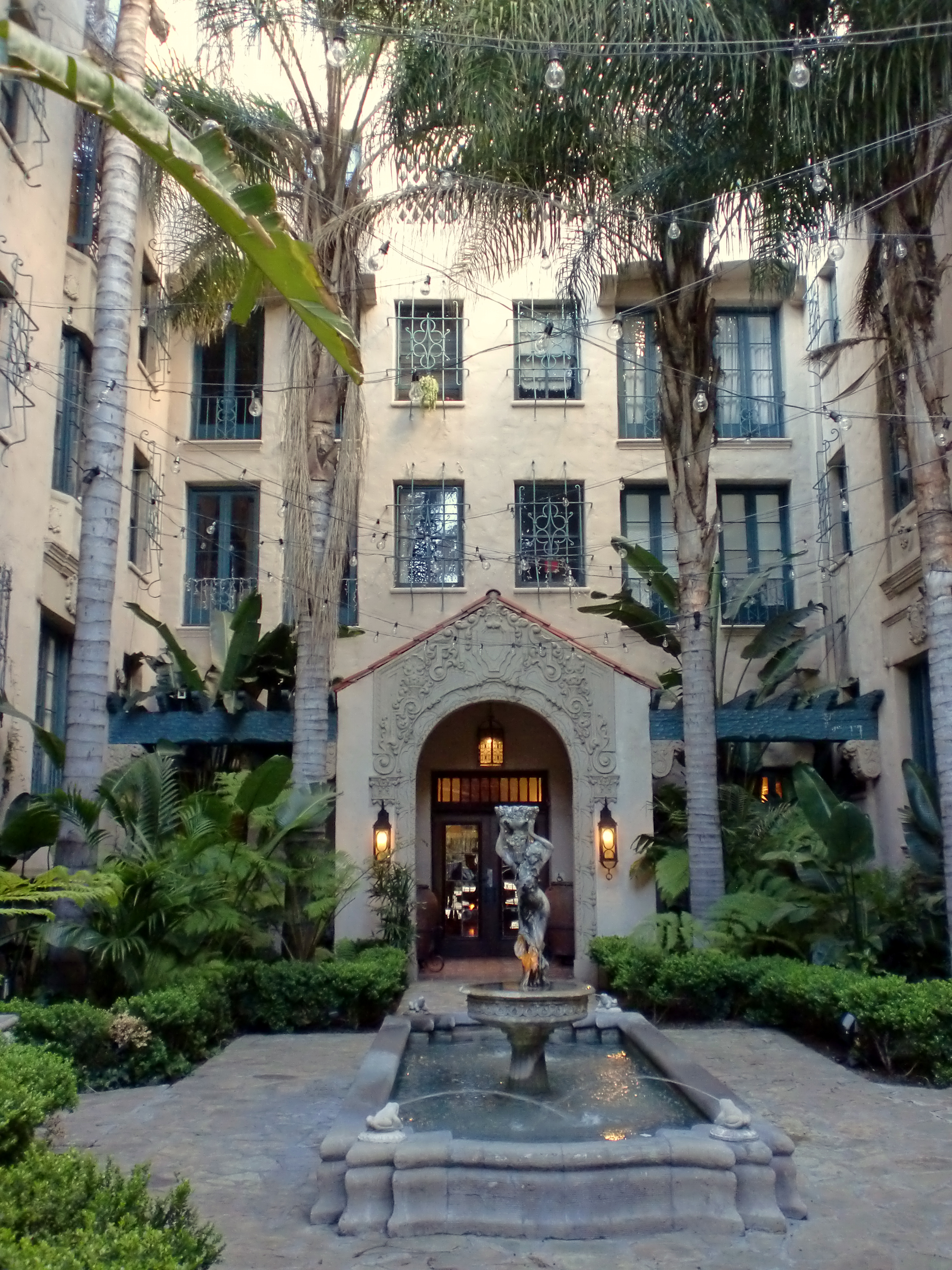
Entrance to apartments, faces Wilshire Boulevard.

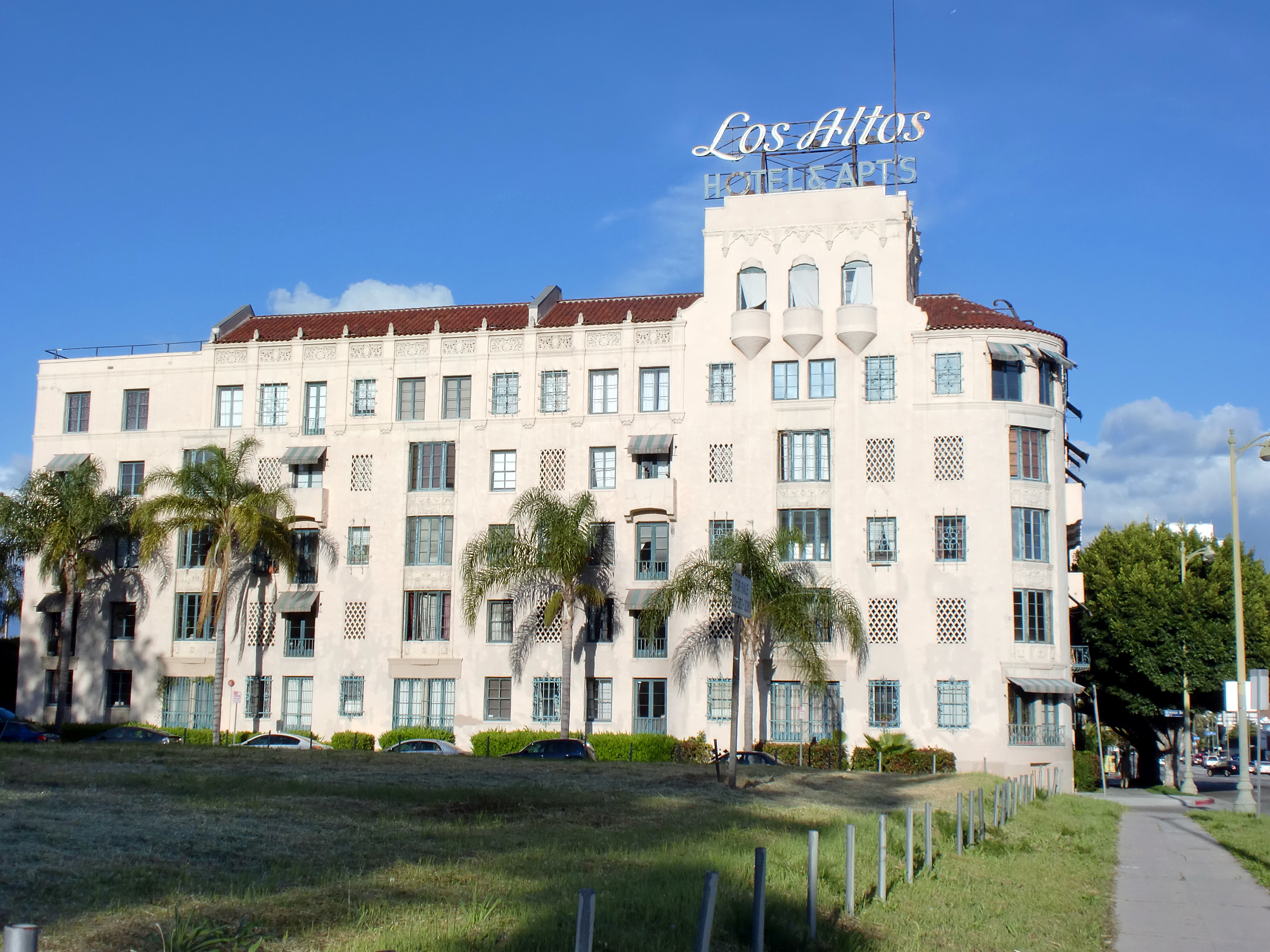
Entire West wall of the apartments
