= Ann Goldstein =

Ann Goldstein may refer to:

- Ann Goldstein (curator) (born 1957), American museum curator
- Ann Goldstein (translator) (born 1949), American translator of Italian
