= East of Borneo (magazine) =

Contemporary art publication

- Editor: Thomas Lawson and Stacey Allan
- Categories: Visual art
- First issue: October 2010
- Country: United States
- Based in: Los Angeles, CA
- Language: English
- Website: www.eastofborneo.org

East of Borneo is an online art publication examining contemporary art and art history as considered from Los Angeles. Funded and supported by the California Institute of the Arts, it was founded in 2010 by Thomas Lawson and Stacey Allan.

In 2012, East of Borneo launched East of Borneo Books. The first release was Piecing Together Los Angeles: An Esther McCoy Reader. It was followed by Facing the Music: Documenting Walt Disney Concert Hall and The Redevelopment of Downtown Los Angeles, a project by Allan Sekula, and Second Life: Light Bulb (1977-81), edited by Chip Chapman.
