= You Are Not Yourself =

Artwork by Barbara Kruger

You Are Not Yourself (1981)

You Are Not Yourself is a work of appropriation art by Barbara Kruger created in 1981.

== Description ==
You Are Not Yourself depicts a woman examining herself in a mirror that has presumably been struck and shattered by a bullet. The text "You are not yourself" appears on the photograph, surrounding the image of the woman. The work was included in the exhibition "Barbara Kruger: Belief + Doubt" at the Hirshhorn Museum in Washington, D.C., which has been on view since 2012.

== Interpretations ==
As is the case with much of Kruger's art, You Are Not Yourself is often interpreted with a feminist analysis. Critics have discussed the gendered implications of the image, noting that the woman's shattered reflection suggests the existence of women in society is inherently fragmented. Women are held to many standards and forced to adopt conflicting roles only to become an amalgamation of other's expectations and assumptions; when a woman finally has a moment for self-reflection (or, as Kruger suggests, a chance to catch a glance in the mirror) she finds that she is "not herself". The text itself resembles crudely cut and pasted letters that create a jarring tone and echo the theme of breaking. Some critics interpret the image as a call for viewers to consider their own subjectivity and evaluate the societal messages that they may be receiving. In 1991 interview, Kruger said: "I would venture to guess that many people heed their mirrors at least five times a day and that vigilance certainly can structure physical and psychic identity."

The use of pronouns in Kruger's work is often discussed as a potential source of meaning. In You Are Not Yourself, questions have been raised about the identity of the subject that Kruger hails: who is the "you" in question? You Are Not Yourself features a shattered mirror that has been interpreted to symbolize the reflection of each unique viewer, suggesting that the embedded message is directed towards everyone who views the piece. This image, like others in Kruger's oeuvre, has been used to discuss aspects of critical theory concerning perception and the nature of self.

== See also ==
- Untitled Film Stills - a series of photographs by artist Cindy Sherman similar in content
- Criticism of capitalism
