= Garry Gross =

American photographer (1937–2010)

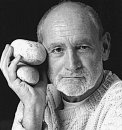
- Portrait photographer Garry Gross
- Born: November 6, 1937; Bronx, New York, U.S.
- Died: November 30, 2010 (aged 73); New York City, New York, U.S.
- Education: Colorado State University
- Known for: Photography

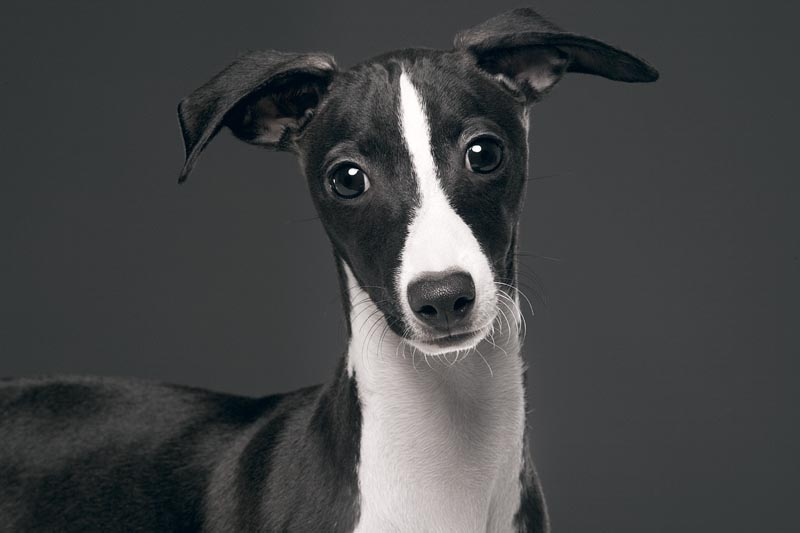
'Leo', Digital print by Garry Gross, 2004

Garry Gross (November 6, 1937 – November 30, 2010) was an American fashion photographer who went on to specialize in dog portraiture. He faced serious controversy regarding photographs taken for a Playboy publication, which included nude images of a 10-year-old Brooke Shields.

== Career ==
Born in New York to a Jewish family, Gross began his career as a commercial photographer, apprenticing with photographers Francesco Scavullo and James Moore and studying with master photographers Lisette Model and Richard Avedon. His fashion and beauty photography has been featured in numerous fashion magazines over the years and his work has appeared on the covers of such magazines as GQ, Cosmopolitan, and New York Magazine. Celebrities Gross has photographed include Brooke Shields, Calvin Klein, Gloria Steinem, Whitney Houston, and Lou Reed.

Gross studied with the Animal Behavior Center of New York and became a certified dog trainer in 2002, using that training to begin working with dogs and creating Fine Art style portraits. His last project was a series of large scale portraits of senior dogs and he actively supported charities that benefited rescue dogs and senior dogs.

His work has received awards from The Art Directors Club and the Advertising Club of New York.

== Brooke Shields photograph controversy ==
Gross was the photographer of a controversial set of nude images, two containing full-frontal nudity, taken in 1975 of a then ten-year-old Brooke Shields, with the consent of her mother, Teri Shields, for the Playboy publication Sugar 'n' Spice. The images show Shields standing and sitting in a bathtub while wearing makeup and oil. In 1981, Brooke Shields attempted to prevent further use of the photographs but in 1983 a US Court ruled that a child is bound by the terms of the valid, unrestricted consents to the use of photographs executed by a guardian and that the image did not breach child pornography laws. In ruling, the presiding Judge stated: "The issue on this appeal is whether an infant model may disaffirm a prior unrestricted consent executed on her behalf by her parent and maintain an action pursuant to section 51 of the Civil Rights Law against her photographer for republication of photographs of her. We hold that she may not."

A photograph of one of those original photographs was produced by American artist Richard Prince, an artist famous for his "reproduction photography." Prince called his version "Spiritual America," after a 1923 photograph by Alfred Stieglitz that depicts the genitals of a workhorse. Although it had previously been shown in New York's Guggenheim Museum in 2007, eluding debate, "Spiritual America" was removed from the Tate Modern gallery exhibition called Pop Life: Art in a Material World in 2009 after protesters described the image as "obscene" and a "magnet for pedophiles".

Gross has stated that "The photo has been infamous from the day I took it and I intended it to be" and that he was "disappointed but not surprised" by the Tate's decision to remove the photograph.

== Death ==
Gross died from cardiac arrest at his home in the New York City's Greenwich Village.

== See also ==
- Richard Prince
