= Society for the Activation of Social Space through Art and Sound =

The Society for the Activation of Social Space through Art and Sound (SASSAS) is a non profit organization that serves to promote the creation, presentation, and recognition of experimental art and sound events in the greater Los Angeles area. SASSAS members are interested in how experimental art, architecture and music interact.

== History ==
To encourage this interaction in a social context, Los Angeles artist Cindy Bernard initiated the “sound." concert series in 1999, providing forums where musicians from diverse backgrounds could work together. In 2000, “sound.” moved to the MAK Center for Art and Architecture at the Schindler House in West Hollywood. This informal residential setting enabled audiences to enjoy an intimate musical experience while surrounded by an important example of modern architecture. Building on the success of “sound.”, SASSAS was incorporated and a Board of Directors formed in 2002. Starting in 2004, SASSAS developed partnerships with larger venues such as REDCAT and the John Anson Ford Amphitheatre, bringing even greater exposure to the Los Angeles experimental community.

To date, more than 40 concerts have been presented including performances by Pauline Oliveros, James Tenney, Nels Cline, Petra Haden, Wadada Leo Smith, Phil Cohran, Roscoe Mitchell, Joseph Jarman, Harold Budd, Glenn Branca, Tetuzi Akiyama and many others.

In addition to producing concerts, SASSAS maintains an extensive on-line audio archive of past concerts.
