= Cindy Bernard =

American visual artist

- Born: San Pedro, California
- Education: CSU Long Beach; California Institute of the Arts
- Known for: Conceptual Art, Activism, Impresario
- Website: cindybernard.com

Cindy Bernard is a Los-Angeles based artist whose artistic practice comprises photography, video, performance, and activism. In 2002, Cindy Bernard founded the Society for the Activation of Social Space through Art and Sound, which presents site-relational experimental music. Her numerous Hitchcock references have been discussed in Dan Auiler's Vertigo: The Making of a Hitchcock Classic (1998), essays by Douglas Cunningham and Christine Spengler in The San Francisco of Alfred Hitchcock's Vertigo: Place, Pilgrimage and Commemoration (2012) and Spengler's Hitchcock and Contemporary Art (2014).

In addition to her participation in the 1995 Biennale d'art contemporain de Lyon, Bernard has presented solo projects at the Los Angeles County Museum of Art (2011) and the Stedelijk Museum (2013) in Amsterdam. She has also had solo exhibitions at the MAK Center for Art and Architecture, Los Angeles, CA (2000); James Hockey Gallery, UCA Farnham, UK (1995); and the Center for Creative Photography, Tucson, AZ (1993), which traveled to the Southeast Museum of Photography, Daytona, FL.

Bernard has also had numerous one-person gallery exhibitions at Tracy Williams Ltd, New York, NY (2005) and (2008), Margo Leavin Gallery, Los Angeles, CA (2004); Air de Paris, Paris, FR (1991) and (1996); Richard Kuhlenschmidt Gallery, Santa Monica, CA (1990 and 1992) and Michael Kohn Gallery, Los Angeles, CA, 1988.

Bernard's work has been included in hundreds of group exhibitions, including the seminal exhibitions "The Artists' Museum" (2010), Museum of Contemporary Art, Los Angeles; "Les Peintures de la Vie Moderne" (2006), Centre Pompidou; "Visual Music: Synaesthesia in Art and Music Since 1900" (2005), Hirshhorn Museum and Sculpture Garden; "Made in California" (2000), Los Angeles County Museum of Art,"Hall of Mirrors: Art and Film Since 1945" (1996), Museum of Contemporary Art, Los Angeles, which traveled to Wexner Center for the Arts, Palazzo delle Esposizioni, Rome, IT and the Museum of Contemporary Art, Chicago; and the "1989 Whitney Biennial", Whitney Museum of American Art. In 2002, she was the recipient of the Creative Capital Award in the discipline of Emerging Fields.

Her work is in eight museum collections, including the Museum of Modern Art, Centre Pompidou, Center for Creative Photography, Museum of Contemporary Art, Los Angeles, Los Angeles County Museum of Art and Nouveau Musée d'Art Contemporain de Lyon.

Bernard earned a B.A. from the California State University, Long Beach and an M.F.A. from California Institute of the Arts

== Exhibition highlights ==
=== Fabric (1987) and Security Envelopes (1987–1993) ===
For her "Fabric" series, Bernard shot close-up images of clothes dating from the forties and fifties in black and white, rendering abstract patterns more akin to painting than photography. "Security Envelopes" focuses on patterns adopted by businesses to disguise envelopes' contents, which she noticed while working as a book keeper in a gallery. First shown as a 50-part grid and four small grids at Michael Kohn Gallery in 1988, she exhibited a 5 x 15 grid of photographs of security envelopes at the 1989 Whitney Biennial and a 5 x 20 grid in her 1993 exhibition at the Center for Creative Photography. The original 50-part grid was shown in "The Artists' Museum" at the Museum of Contemporary Art, Los Angeles. Over the years, several of her small security-envelope grids have either disappeared following corporate bankruptcies or have surfaced in surprise collections, leading her to post an image noting each grid's status.

=== Ask the Dust (1988–1992) and Location Proposals #2, #4 and #6 (1997–2005) ===
For her series "Ask the Dust," she selected a scene from 21 films (one for each year 1954–1974) and photographed each location from the cameraman's original vantage. Two Roads (1991) pairs a scene from Hitchcock's film To Catch a Thief (1955) and the site of Grace Kelly's fatal 1982 accident. Echoing Jean Baudrillard's summoning film's capacity to shape the real, the fictional image reflects reality, and vice versa, when hung low and face to face. For "The Grandfather" series, which she also considers part of the "Ask the Dust" trilogy, she reprinted cross-country travel photographs that her grandfather took between 1950 and 1979.

Location Proposals #2 and #6 are site-relational projections that have been presented in varying contexts either outdoors or indoors, while #4 was commissioned by Los Angeles County Museum of Art for the windows of the former May Company Department Store, the future home of the Academy Museum.

=== Band Shells (2003–2004/2013) ===
For "Band Shells," she has photographed empty band shells from different U.S. states, hoping to cover all fifty one day.

=== The Inquisitive Musician (2005–2013) ===
For her solo museum projects at the Los Angeles County Museum of Art and the Stedelijk Museum, Bernard presented The Inquisitive Musician. Based on a 17th-century satire by Johann Kuhnau, the work was translated and adapted by Bernard and artist David Hatcher, with accompanying music organized by experimental guitarist and bagpiper David Watson. Both productions consisted of a reading of the script, live music, and prerecorded video. Both casts consisted of musicians and artists drawn from the local community – in Los Angeles: Mike Watt, Dave Muller and Marnie Weber and in Amsterdam: G.W. Sok and Thijs van Leer among others.

=== Silent Key (2008–2009) ===
For her exhibition "Silent Key" at Tracy Williams LTD and the Boston Center for the Arts. Bernard created a grid of more than 100 QSL Cards from regions where the system of government has changed, a chronicle of 20th-century geopolitical history.

== Other projects ==
=== sound. (since 1999) and Society for the Activation of Social Space through Art and Sound (since 2002) ===
In 1998, she organized "angels gate dusk," an evening of chance improvisational trios that inspired sound., an annual concert series at the MAK Center for Art and Architecture, that evolved into the 501(c)3 Society for the Activation of Social Space through Art and Sound, whose mission is to increase the visibility and availability of experimental art and sound practices.

=== MOCA Mobilization (2008 and 2012–2013) ===
When the Museum of Contemporary Art, Los Angeles opted to announce its 2008 fiscal crisis as a Los Angeles Times November 19, 2008 news story, Bernard and artist Diana Thater formed MOCA Mobilization to rally public support for the museum and its employees. MOCA Mobilization's December 17, 2008 press release noted that it had amassed 3300 members, who had signed the petition to "maintain MOCA's independence and to keep its collection intact and accessible to a wide and appreciative public." A week later, Eli Broad agreed to furnish a matching gift that stabilized the museum's finances.

When four artists resigned from MOCA's board in response to Chief Curator Paul Schimmel's dismissal in 2012, MOCA Mobilization submitted a 5-point petition requesting the board begin its search for key curatorial positions within three months, appoint four artist trustees and enact greater transparency.

== Teaching ==
An adjunct professor at Art Center College of Design since 1999, Bernard has also taught at University of Southern California, University of California Los Angeles, University of California Santa Barbara, University of California Irvine, Loyola Marymount University, Northwestern University, University of California San Diego, University of California Riverside.

In 2013, Bernard was the inaugural Ruffin Distinguished Artist in Residence at McIntire Department of Art at the University of Virginia.

She has presented her work at dozens of art institutions including the Los Angeles County Museum of Art, University of Arizona, Otis College of Art and Design, Simon Fraser University, University of Southern California, Northwestern University, School of the Museum of Fine Arts Boston, San Francisco Art Institute, California State Los Angeles, University of California Riverside and College Art Association.
