= Barbara Kruger =

American artist (born 1945)

- Born: January 26, 1945 (age 81); Newark, New Jersey, U.S.
- Education: Syracuse University; Parsons School of Design
- Known for: Visual art and graphic design
- Movement: Feminism, Pictures Generation
- Awards: Leone D'Oro Venice Biennale; Goslarer Kaiserring

Barbara Kruger (born January 26, 1945) is an American conceptual artist and collagist associated with the Pictures Generation. She is most known for her visual word art that consists of black-and-white photographs, overlaid with declarative captions, stated in white-on-red Futura Bold Oblique or Helvetica Ultra Condensed text. The phrases in her works often include pronouns such as "you", "your", "I", "we", and "they", addressing cultural constructions of power, identity, consumerism, and sexuality. Kruger's artistic mediums include photography, sculpture, graphic design, architecture, as well as video and audio installations.

Kruger lives and works in New York and Los Angeles. She is an Emerita Distinguished Professor of New Genres at the UCLA School of the Arts and Architecture. In 2021, Kruger was included in Time magazine's annual list of the 100 Most Influential People.

== Early life and career ==
Kruger was born into a working-class family in Newark, New Jersey. Her father worked as a chemical tech for Shell Oil and her mother was a legal secretary.

Kruger graduated from Weequahic High School. She attended Syracuse University, but left after one year due to the death of her father. After her year at Syracuse University, in 1965, she went on to attend the Parsons School of Design in New York for a semester. Over the next ten years, Kruger established herself whilst pursuing graphic design for magazines and freelance picture editing, as well as designing book jackets. By the late 1960s, Kruger became interested in poetry, and began attending poetry readings as well as writing her own poetry. While at Parsons School of Design, Kruger studied art and design with Diane Arbus and Marvin Israel, and soon obtained a design job at Condé Nast Publications in her late teens. Shortly after, Kruger was awarded the position of head designer for the following year. She initially worked as a designer at Mademoiselle and later moved on to work part-time as a picture editor for House and Garden, Aperture, and other publications. She also wrote film, television, and music columns for Artforum and REALLIFE Magazine at the suggestion of her friend Ingrid Sischy.

Kruger's earliest works date back to 1969, when she began creating large wall hangings which incorporated materials such as yarn, beads, sequins, feathers, and ribbons. These pieces represented the feminist reclamation of craft during this period. Kruger crocheted, sewed, and painted brightly hued and erotically suggestive objects, some of which were included by curator Marcia Tucker in the 1973 Whitney Biennial. She drew her inspiration for these pieces from Magdalena Abakanowicz's show at the Museum of Modern Art. Although some of these works were included in the Whitney Biennial, Kruger became detached and unsatisfied with her working output. In 1976, she took a break from making what had become more abstract works, feeling that her work had become meaningless and mindless. She then moved to Berkeley, California, where she taught at the University of California and became inspired by the writings of Walter Benjamin and Roland Barthes. In 1977, she returned to making art, working with her own architectural photographs and publishing an art book, Picture/Readings, in 1979. She was inspired to photograph architecture by her family's practice of touring "model homes they could never afford".

At the beginning of her art career, Kruger reportedly felt intimidated by entering New York galleries due to the prevailing atmosphere of the art scene which, to her, did not welcome "particularly independent, non-masochistic women". However, she received early support for her projects from groups such as the Public Art Fund, which encouraged her to continue making art. She switched to her modern practice of collage in the early 1980s.

== Artistic practice ==
Addressing issues of language and sign, Kruger has often been grouped with such feminist postmodern artists as Jenny Holzer, Sherrie Levine, Martha Rosler, and Cindy Sherman. Like Holzer and Sherman, in particular, she uses the techniques of mass communication and advertising to explore gender and identity. She discusses her interest in representing "how we are to one another" and the "broad sort of scope" this provides for her work. Kruger is considered to be part of the Pictures Generation.

=== Imagery and text ===
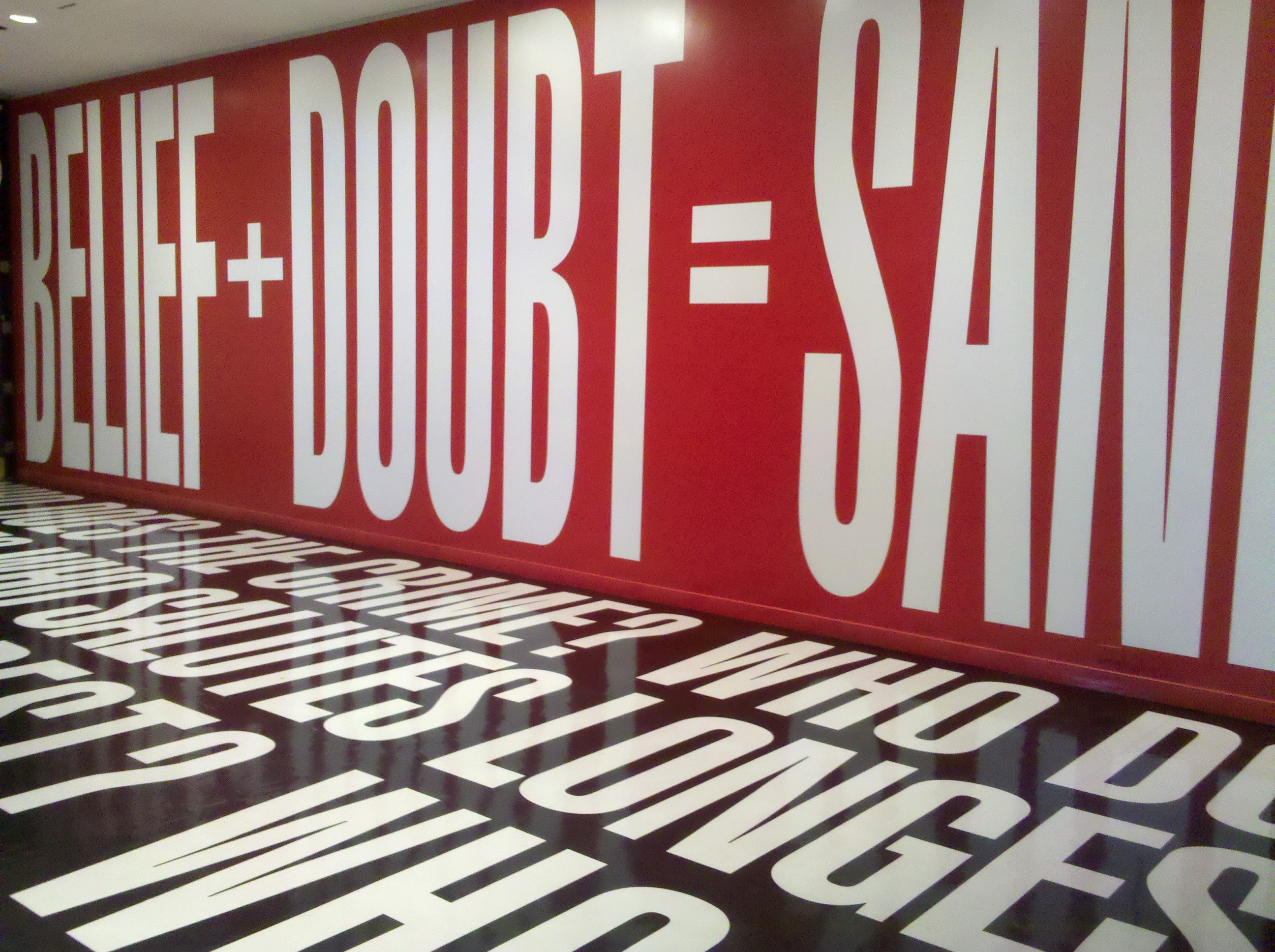
Belief+Doubt (2012) at the Hirshhorn Museum and Sculpture Garden

Much of Kruger's work pairs found photographs with pithy and assertive text that challenges the viewer, known as word art. Her method includes developing her ideas on a computer, later transferring the results (often billboard-sized) into printed images. Examples of her instantly recognizable slogans include "I shop therefore I am", "Your body is a battleground", and "You are not yourself" appearing in her signature white letters against a red background. Most of her work deals with provocative topics like feminism, consumerism, and individual autonomy and desire, frequently appropriating images from mainstream magazines and using her bold phrases to frame them in a new context.

Kruger has said that, "I work with pictures and words because they have the ability to determine who we are and who we aren't." A recurring element in her work is the appropriation and alteration of existing images. In describing her use of appropriation, Kruger states:

Pictures and words seem to become the rallying points for certain assumptions. There are assumptions of truth and falsity and I guess the narratives of falsity are called fictions. I replicate certain words and watch them stray from or coincide with the notions of fact and fiction.

Her poster for the 1989 Women's March on Washington in support of legal abortion included a woman’s face bisected into positive and negative photographic reproductions, accompanied by the text "Your body is a battleground." A year later, Kruger used this slogan in a billboard commissioned by the Wexner Center for the Arts. Twelve hours later, a group opposed to abortion responded to Kruger's work by replacing the adjacent billboard with an image depicting an eight-week-old fetus.

Kruger's early monochrome pre-digital works, known as 'paste ups', reveal the influence of the artist's experience as a magazine editorial designer during her early career. These small scale works, the largest of which is 11 x 13 inches (28 x 33 cm), are composed of altered found images, and texts either culled from the media or invented by the artist. A negative of each work was then produced and used to make enlarged versions of these initial 'paste ups'. Between 1978 and 1979, she completed "Picture/Readings", simple photographs of modest houses alternating with panels of words. From 1992 on, Kruger designed covers for a number of magazines, including Ms., Esquire, Newsweek, and The New Republic. Her signature font style of Futura Bold type is likely inspired by the "Big Idea" or "Creative Revolution" advertising style of the 1960s that she was exposed to during her experience at Mademoiselle.

In 1990, Kruger roused the Japanese American community of Little Tokyo, Los Angeles, with her proposal to paint the Pledge of Allegiance, bordered by provocative questions, on the side of a warehouse in the heart of the historic downtown neighborhood. Kruger had been commissioned by MOCA to paint a mural for "A Forest of Signs: Art in the Crisis of Representation", a 1989 exhibition that also included works by Barbara Bloom, Jenny Holzer, Jeff Koons, Sherrie Levine, and Richard Prince. But before the mural went up, Kruger herself and curator Ann Goldstein presented it at various community meetings over a period of 18 months. After participants voiced protests about her design, the artist offered to eliminate the pledge from her mural proposal, while still retaining a series of questions painted in the colors and format of the American flag: "Who is bought and sold? Who is beyond the law? Who is free to choose? Who follows orders? Who salutes longest? Who prays loudest? Who dies first? Who laughs last?". A full year after the exhibition closed, Kruger's reconfigured mural finally went up for a two-year run.

In 1995, with architects Henry Smith-Miller and Laurie Hawkinson and landscape architect Nicholas Quennell, she designed the 200-foot-long (60 m) sculptural letters Picture This for a stage and outdoor amphitheater at the North Carolina Museum of Art, Raleigh.

For a site-specific piece that she produced at the Parrish Art Museum in 1998, Kruger placed across the upper range of the museum's Romanesque facade stark red letters that read, "You belong here"; below, on columns separating three arched entry portals, stacked letters spelled "Money" and "Taste". As part of the Venice Biennale in 2005, Kruger installed a digitally printed vinyl mural across the entire facade of the Italian pavilion, thereby dividing it into three parts—green at the left, red at the right, white in between. In English and Italian, the words "money" and "power" climbed the portico's columns; the left wall said, "Pretend things are going as planned", while "God is on my side; he told me so" filled the right. In 2012, her installation Belief+Doubt, which covers 6,700 square feet (620 m^{2}) of surface area and was printed on wallpaper-like sheets in the artist's signature colors of red, black, and white, was installed at the Hirshhorn Museum and Sculpture Garden.

In 2022, as the arguably most important voice in art for Abortion-rights movements, Kruger created a series of new works in response to the leaked Supreme Court documents that would overturn Roe v. Wade. Kruger said, "The end of Roe was clearly the result of the right's rage-filled campaign to undo women's reproductive health and agency. They have been unrelenting, while the middle and left too often kept silent, seeing the issue as the third rail of American politics, regardless of the poll numbers favoring Roe. For decades, abortion was absent or marginalized at campaign debates."

=== Public transport ===
In 1994, Kruger's L'empathie peut changer le monde (Empathy can change the world) was installed on a train station platform in Strasbourg, France. For a 1997 show in New York, Kruger had city buses wrapped with quotations from figures such as Malcolm X, Courtney Love, and H.L. Mencken. To promote Kruger's first retrospective, at the Museum of Contemporary Art, Los Angeles, she created 15 billboards and countless wild postings, executed and installed in both English and Spanish. In support of a public awareness campaign to promote arts instruction in the Los Angeles Unified School District, Kruger covered a bus with phrases like, "Give your brain as much attention as you do your hair and you'll be a thousand times better off"; "from here to there"; "Don't be a jerk"; and "You want it. You buy it. You forget it." In 2017, Kruger's artwork was featured on 50,000 limited edition MetroCards released by New York's Metropolitan Transit Authority.

=== Fashion ===
In 1984, Kruger created a T-shirt design that featured a blown-up image of a woman's face with text running across the figure's eyes and mouth reading, "I can't look at you ... and breathe at the same time." The shirt was produced as a collaborative project with fashion designer Willi Smith for his WilliWear Productions label.

In 2017, Kruger collaborated with clothing brand Volcom for her contribution to the Performa 17 biennial in New York. She created a pop-up shop in the city's SoHo neighborhood where T-shirts, beanies, sweatshirts, and skateboards were up for sale.

=== Permanent installations ===
Between 1998 and 2008, Kruger created permanent installations for the Fisher College of Business, the Broad Contemporary Art Museum at LACMA, and Price Center at the University of California, San Diego. From 2008 until 2011, the Moderna Museet in Stockholm showed a site-specific work consisting of three large, wall mounted collages at the museum's entrance area. In 2012, Kruger created the permanent installation of her work Belief+Doubt in the lower level of the Hirshhorn Museum and Sculpture Garden in Washington, D.C.

In 2024, Kruger was among the 18 artists selected by the Port Authority of New York and New Jersey to create installations for John F. Kennedy International Airport’s new Terminal 6, set to open in 2026.

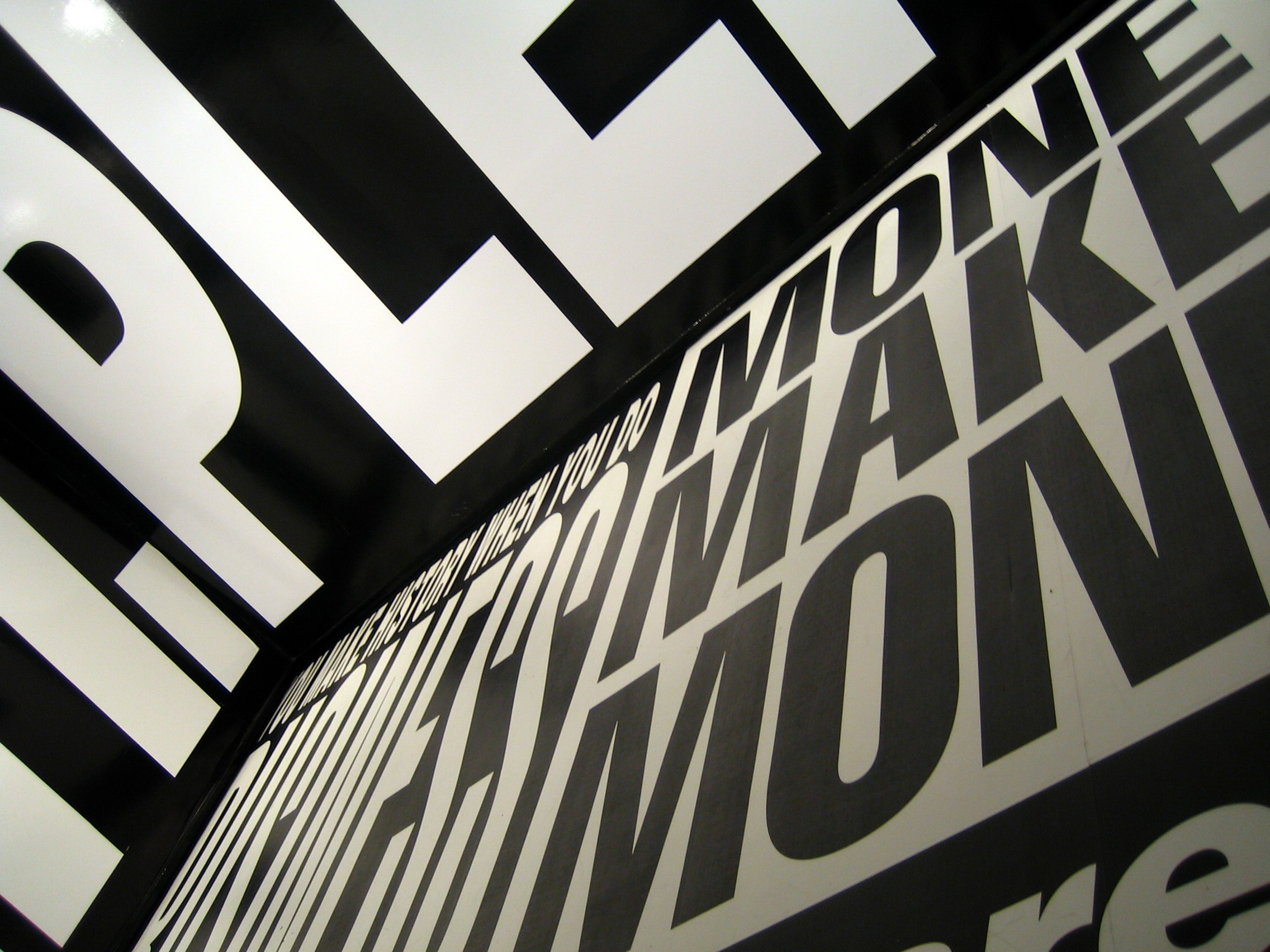
Barbara Kruger at ACCA, Melbourne

=== Other works ===
Since the mid-1990s, Kruger has created large-scale immersive video and audio installations. Enveloping the viewer with the seductions of direct address, the work continues her questioning of power, control, affection, and contempt: still images now move and speak and spatialize their commentary. In 1997, Kruger produced a series of fiberglass sculptures of compromised public figures, including John F. and Robert F. Kennedy hoisting Marilyn Monroe on their shoulders. In 2016, Kruger created a work protesting the election of Donald Trump for the cover of New York magazine and participated in a January 20, 2017, inauguration boycott. For the 2020 edition of the Frieze Art Fair in Los Angeles, she presented a series of 20 questions—including "Who do you think you are?" and "Who dies first? Who laughs last?"—displayed across digital billboards, street banners, landmarks, and public spaces throughout the city.

=== Teaching ===
Kruger has taught an Independent Study Program at the Whitney Museum, and at the California Institute of the Arts in Valencia, the University of California, Berkeley, and in Chicago. After teaching for five years at UCSD, she joined the faculty at the UCLA School of the Arts and Architecture, where she is an Emerita Distinguished Professor of New Genres. Among Kruger’s former students are Nikita Gale, Math Bass, Tala Madani, Amadour, Andrea Fraser, Delia Brown, and Martine Syms. In 1995–96, she was artist in residence at the Wexner Center for the Arts, where she created Public Service Announcements addressing the issue of domestic violence. In 2000, she was the Wiegand Foundation Artist in Residence at Scripps College, Claremont. She has written about television, film, and culture for Artforum, Esquire, The New York Times, and The Village Voice.

=== Connections with other artists ===
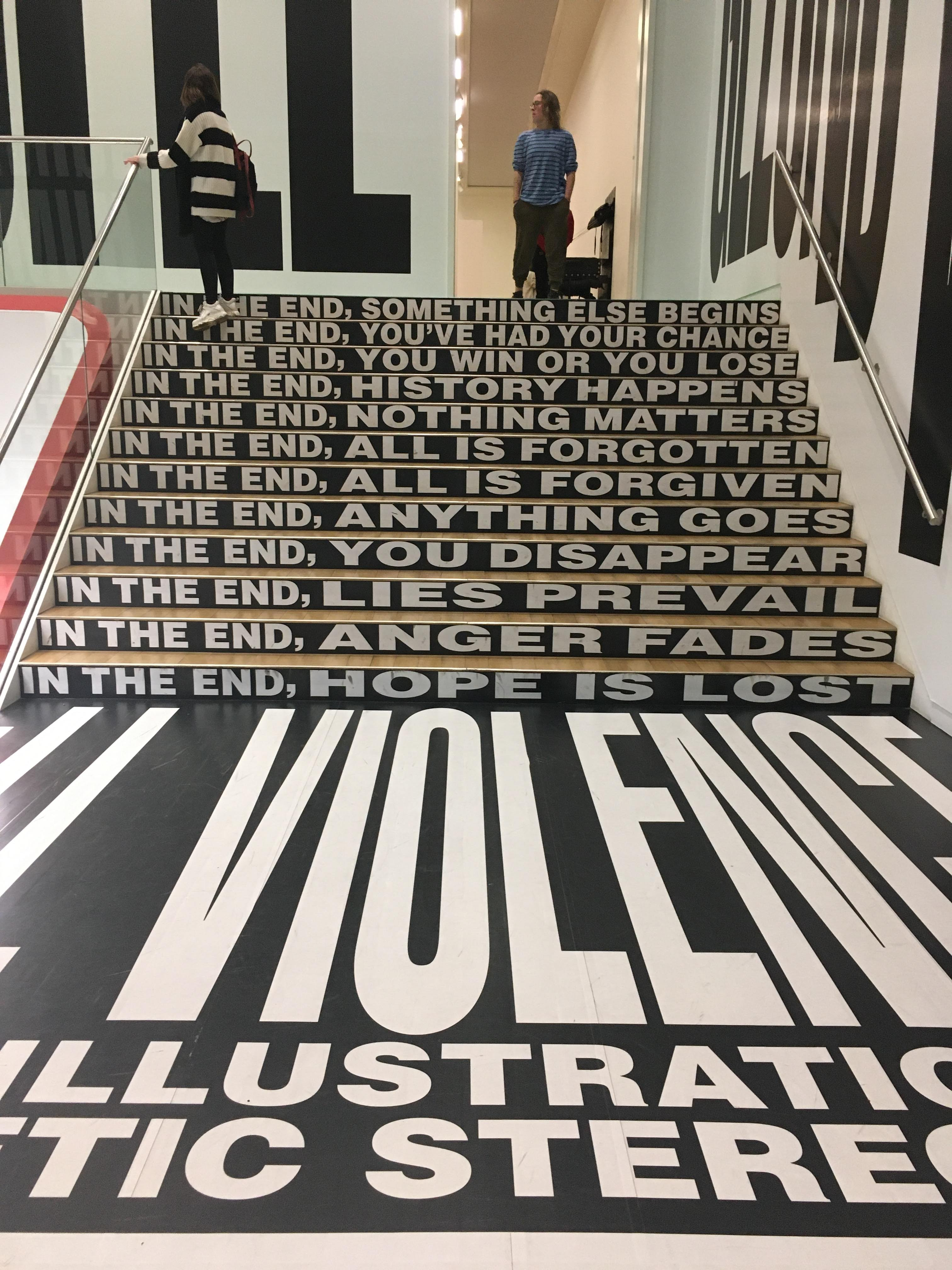
Barbara Kruger at the Stedelijk Museum Amsterdam

Kruger was involved with a group of artists who had graduated from CalArts and gravitated to New York City in the 1970s, including Ross Bleckner and David Salle, listing them as her first peer group. She considered Diane Arbus to be her "first female role model ... that didn't wash the floor six times a day." She also associated with Julian Schnabel, Marilyn Lerner, Sherrie Levine, Cindy Sherman, James Welling, Nancy Dwyer, Louise Lawler, Sarah Charlesworth, Laurie Simmons, Carol Squiers, Judith Barry, Jenny Holzer, Richard Prince, Becky Johnston, and Lynne Tillman. Kruger joined the group called Artists Meeting for Cultural Change in the 1970s, but noted about the experience, "I wasn't a real [sic] active speaker; I was intimidated but also curious." In the same interview, Kruger explained that, although she was friends with a wide range of artists, she was not really influenced by them because she was working to support herself. In the early 1980s, Kruger also associated and exhibited with Colab artists, such as at the Island of Negative Utopia show at The Kitchen in 1984.

== Exhibitions ==
In 1979, Barbara Kruger exhibited her first works combining appropriated photographs and fragments of superimposed text at P.S. 1 Contemporary Art Center, in Long Island City, Queens. Her first institutional show was staged in London, when Iwona Blazwick decided to exhibit her work at the Institute of Contemporary Arts in 1983. In 1999, the Museum of Contemporary Art in Los Angeles mounted the first retrospective exhibition to provide a comprehensive overview of Kruger's career since 1978; the show travelled to the Whitney Museum of American Art in New York in 2000. Kruger has since been the subject of many one-person exhibitions, including shows organized by the Institute of Contemporary Arts in London (1983), the Musée d'art contemporain de Montréal (1985), Serpentine Gallery in London (1994), Palazzo delle Papesse Centro Arte Contemporanea in Siena (2002), the Museum of Contemporary Art San Diego (2005), and Moderna Museet in Stockholm (2008).

In 2009, Kruger was included among the seminal artists whose work was exhibited in "The Pictures Generation, 1974–1984" at the Metropolitan Museum of Art. Kruger has also participated in the Whitney Biennial (1983, 1985, and 1987) and Documenta 7 and 8 (1982 and 1987). She represented the United States at the Venice Biennale in 1982 and participated in 2005 and 2022. She received the prestigious Leone d'Oro (Golden Lion award) for lifetime achievement.

In 2007, Kruger was one of the many artists to be a part of South Korea's Incheon Women Artists' Biennale in Seoul. This marked South Korea's first women's biennial. That same year, she designed "Consider This...", an exhibition at the Los Angeles County Museum of Art. In September 2009, Kruger's Between Being Born and Dying, a major installation commissioned by the Lever House Art Collection, opened at the New York City architectural landmark Lever House. In 2012, as a member of the board of the Museum of Contemporary Art, Los Angeles (MOCA), Kruger volunteered to be the lead funder of the museum's scholarly exhibit Ends of the Earth: Land Art to 1974 and to create a new work on vinyl to sell, with proceeds going entirely toward the show's $1 million budget. An exhibition of new and recent work from Kruger was hosted by Modern Art Oxford in 2014. In 2016, as part of the celebration of the reopening of the East Building Tower Gallery following years of renovation, The National Gallery of Art created an exhibition showcasing 13 works by Barbara Kruger.

From September 19, 2021, to January 24, 2022, Barbara Kruger: Thinking of ~~You~~, I Mean ~~Me~~, I Mean You is a broad comprehensive, immersive exhibition at the Art Institute of Chicago, traveling to Los Angeles County Museum of Art ( LACMA ) from March 20, 2022, to July 17, 2022.

Kruger's words and pictures have been displayed in both galleries and public spaces, as well as offered as framed and unframed photographs, posters, postcards, T-shirts, electronic signboards, façade banners, and billboards.

== Personal life ==
Kruger lives in the Beachwood Canyon neighborhood of Los Angeles.

== Recognition ==
The Museum of Contemporary Art, Los Angeles awarded Kruger the MOCA Award to Distinguished Women in the Arts in 2001. In 2005, she was included in The Experience of Art at the Venice Biennale and was the recipient of the Leone d'Oro for lifetime achievement. At the 10th anniversary Gala in the Garden at the Hammer Museum in 2012, Kruger was honored by TV presenter Rachel Maddow. In 2012, Kruger joined John Baldessari and Catherine Opie in leaving the Museum of Contemporary Art's board in protest, but later returned in support of the museum's new director, Philippe Vergne, in 2014. In 2021, Kruger was included in Time magazine's annual list of the 100 Most Influential People.

== Art market ==
Kruger's first dealer was Gagosian Gallery, with which she did two shows in Los Angeles in the early 1980s. In 1988, she became the first woman to join the art gallery of Mary Boone; she has had nine solo shows there. Following's the gallery's closure, she moved to David Zwirner Gallery in 2019. Kruger is also represented by Rhona Hoffman Gallery, Chicago; and Sprüth Magers Berlin London (since 1985) and L&M Arts in Los Angeles.

In late 2011, Kruger's 1985 photo of a ventriloquist's dummy, Untitled (When I Hear the Word Culture I Take Out My Checkbook), was sold at Christie's for a record $902,500.

== Supreme lawsuit ==
Supreme, a skateboard and apparel brand established in 1994, have been accused of taking their logo—the white word "Supreme" on a red box—from Kruger's signature style. James Jebbia, founder of Supreme, has admitted that the logo was taken from Kruger's work. Kruger herself had not commented on this issue until a lawsuit between Supreme and Leah McSweeney, founder of Married to the Mob (MTTM), a women's street clothing brand. MTTM used the Supreme logo to make a "Supreme Bitch" logo that was printed on T-shirts and hats. In response, Kruger said, "What a ridiculous clusterfuck of totally uncool jokers. I make my work about this kind of sadly foolish farce. I'm waiting for all of them to sue me for copyright infringement." Eventually the lawsuits were dropped upon the parties reaching an agreement that McSweeney could continue to use the phrase "Supreme Bitch" as long as it was "not in the way Barbara Kruger does."

== Books ==
- My Pretty Pony (1989), text by Stephen King, illustrations by Barbara Kruger, Library Fellows of the Whitney Museum of American Art
- Barbara Kruger: January 7 to 28, 1989 by Barbara Kruger, Mary Boone Gallery, 1989
- Barbara Kruger: January 5 to 26, 1991 by Barbara Kruger, 1991
- Remote Control: Power, Cultures, and the World of Appearances by Barbara Kruger, 1994
- Love for Sale by Kate Linker, 1996
- Remaking History (Discussions in Contemporary Culture, No 4) by Barbara Kruger, 1998
- Thinking of You, 1999 (The Museum of Contemporary Art, Los Angeles)
- Barbara Kruger by Angela Vettese, 2002
- Money Talks by Barbara Kruger and Lisa Phillips, 2005
- Barbara Kruger by Barbara Kruger, Rizzoli 2010

== Film and video ==
- "The Globe Shrinks". 2010
- "Pleasure, Pain, Desire, Disgust". 1997
- "Twelve". 2004
- Bulls on Parade video clip, Rage Against the Machine (1996)
- "Art in the Twenty-First Century". 2001
- "Cinefile: Reel Women". 1995
- "Picturing Barbara Kruger". 2015

== See also ==
- Art & Language
- You Are Not Yourself, 1981 work by Kruger
- Feminist art movement in the United States
- Shepard Fairey
- Emi Fontana
- Jenny Holzer
- Martin Firrell
- Louise Lawler
- Mike Kelley
- Joel Wachs, Los Angeles City Council member who helped Kruger get permission for an outdoor art piece
