= Douglas Huebler =

American artist (1924–1997)

- Born: October 27, 1924; Ann Arbor, Michigan, US
- Died: July 12, 1997 (aged 72); Truro, Massachusetts, US
- Education: University of Michigan
- Known for: Conceptual art

Douglas Huebler (October 27, 1924 – July 12, 1997) was an American conceptual artist.

== Life and career ==
Douglas Huebler grew up in rural Michigan during the Depression and served in the Marines in World War II. After the war, funded by the GI Bill, Huebler earned his bachelor's and master's degrees at the University of Michigan, and later went on to study at the Académie Julian in Paris. He worked for several years as a commercial art illustrator in New York as he established himself as an artist. (His family still has a few of the illustrations from this period.)

Initially a painter, Huebler moved on to produce geometric Formica sculptures in the early '60s, which aligned him with the Minimalist movement. In 1969, he participated, with Joseph Kosuth, Robert Barry and Lawrence Weiner, in a landmark exhibition of conceptual art curated by Seth Siegelaub. As part of the show, Huebler issued one of his most famous statements: "The world is full of objects, more or less interesting; I do not wish to add any more." In the late 1960s Huebler's work was published in 0 to 9 magazine, an avant-garde journal which experimented with language and meaning-making.

Huebler subsequently started producing works in numerous media often involving documentary photography, maps and text to explore social environments and the effect of passing time on objects. A representative example of Huebler's early work is Duration Piece #5, 1969, a series of ten black & white photographs with accompanying text; to document the piece, Huebler stood in Central Park and, each time he heard a bird call, he pointed his camera in the direction of the call and shot a photograph. In 1971, he began "Variable Piece #70 (In Process) Global," for which he proposed his intention "to photographically document the existence of everyone alive." In the 1980s and '90s, Huebler began incorporating painting into his conceptual art pieces, creating a persona he called "the Great Corrector," who took works by masters like Picasso, Matisse, Bruegel and Hieronymus Bosch and attempted to "make them better." For his "Buried Treasure" series, incorporating text about the unscrupulous dealer, Huebler paints fake Monets, Van Goghs, Gauguins and a De Chirico.

Huebler's academic career spanned more than forty years; he taught art at Bradford College in Massachusetts, and at Harvard. Huebler served as dean of the art school at California Institute of Arts from 1976 to 1988 where he influenced a generation of artists including Mike Kelley and Christopher Williams. In 1989, he retired to Cape Cod. He died in Truro, Massachusetts in 1997.

== Exhibitions ==
Huebler's first one-person museum exhibition was at the Phillips Gallery, Detroit, in 1953. Thereafter, he exhibited extensively in galleries and museums in the United States and Europe, as well as in international exhibitions such as documenta V (1972), and was included in many surveys of conceptual art. The last retrospective of his work during his lifetime was presented at the Palais des Beaux-Arts in Brussels in 1994. There have been several posthumous one-person exhibitions, including at the Camden Arts Centre, London (2002) and the MAMCO, Geneva (2006). In 2004, Huebler's work was included in the exhibition, A Minimal Future? Art as Object 1958–1968, at the Museum of Contemporary Art, Los Angeles.
