= Ann Goldstein (curator) =

Museum curator

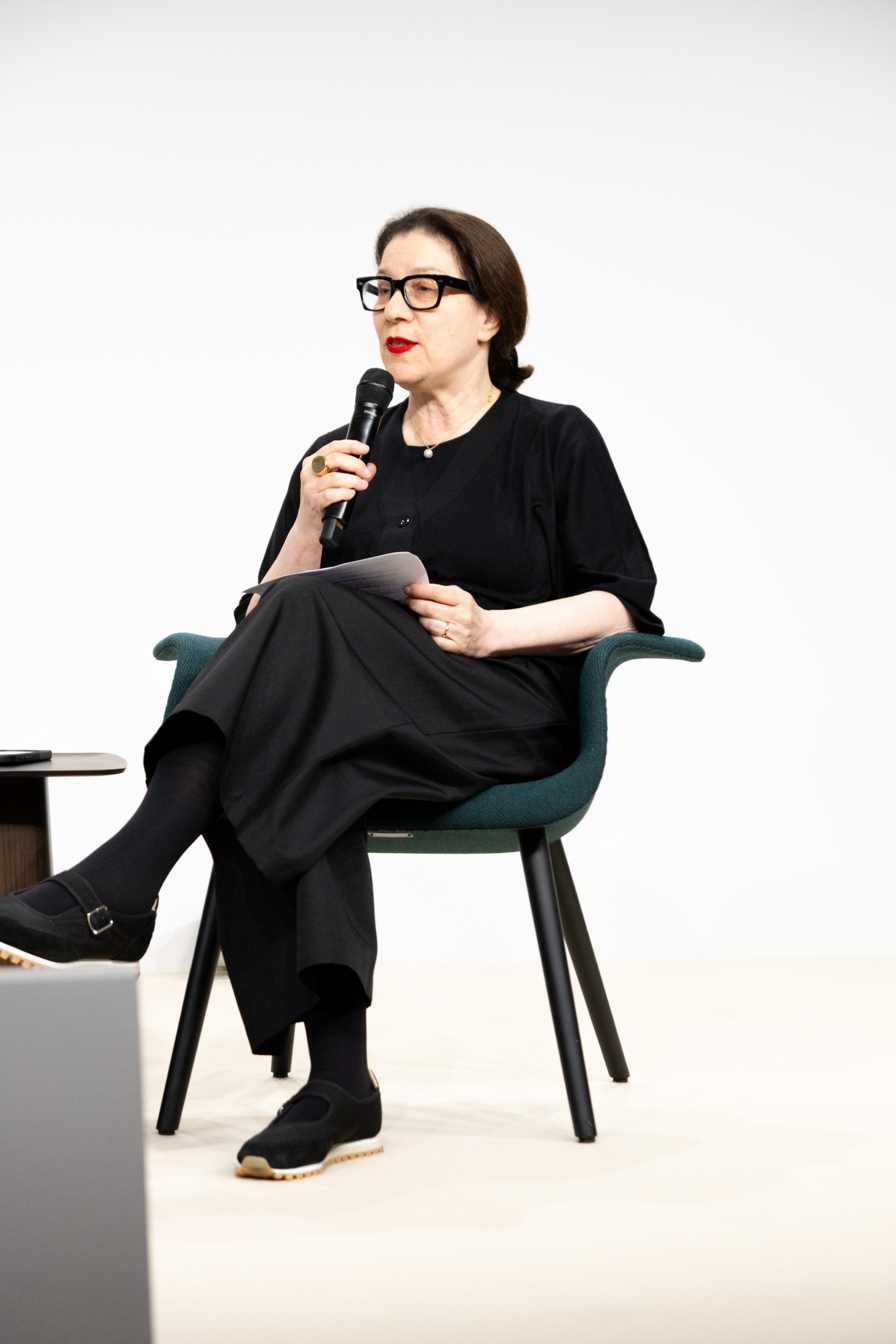
- Born: 1957 (age 68–69); Los Angeles, United States
- Education: University of California, Los Angeles
- Occupations: Curator, museum director, artistic director
- Years active: 1983–present
- Spouse: Christopher Williams

Ann Goldstein (1957) is an American curator currently serving as deputy director and chair of modern and contemporary art at the Art Institute of Chicago. Goldstein formerly served as a curator at the Museum of Contemporary Art, Los Angeles, and as museum director of the Stedelijk Museum Amsterdam.

== Early life and education ==
Goldstein was born in 1957 in Los Angeles, California, United States. She studied at the University of California, Los Angeles, where she got her Bachelor of Fine Arts in studio art.

== Career ==
=== MOCA LA ===
Goldstein worked at the Museum of Contemporary Art in Los Angeles from 1983 to 2009. She was the senior curator from 2001 onwards. Her expertise was minimal and conceptual art of the 1960–70s and current practices.

=== Stedelijk Museum Amsterdam ===
From 2010 until 2012, Goldstein was the museum director of the Stedelijk Museum Amsterdam, a museum of modern art, contemporary art, and design in Amsterdam, Netherlands. Her first two and a half years at the Stedelijk, the museum was closed for renovation (since 2003), until it reopened for the general public in September 2012. In 2013, she was the artistic director of the museum alongside Karin van Gilst as managing director, until Goldstein resigned and left the museum on 1 December 2013.

In 2011, Goldstein chaired the jury that awarded the Museum Ludwig's Wolfgang Hahn Prize to John Miller.

=== Art Institute of Chicago ===
In March 2016, Goldstein was selected as the deputy director, chair, and curator of modern and contemporary art at the Art Institute of Chicago.
