= Jennifer Bolande =

American artist

- Born: 1957 (age 68–69); Cleveland, Ohio, United States
- Known for: Assemblage, sculpture, photography, film, installation art
- Movement: Post-conceptual
- Awards: Guggenheim Fellowship, Andy Warhol Foundation, New York Foundation for the Arts, Tesuque Foundation
- Website: Jennifer Bolande

Jennifer Bolande (born 1957) is an American postconceptual artist. Her art explores affinities and shifts of meaning among sets of objects and images across different contexts and media including sculpture, photography, film and installation. She emerged in the early 1980s with work that expanded on ideas and strategies rooted in conceptualism, Pop, Arte Povera and the so-called Pictures Generation. Her work focuses on thresholds, liminal and peripheral spaces, and transitional moments—states she enacts by the repetition, accumulation and recontextualization of found materials. She frequently selects cultural artifacts on the verge of obsolescence or in flux—and thus acquiring new meanings—and archives, studies and reframes them. Artforum critic Paula Marincola wrote, "Bolande's highly individualized amalgam of sculpture and photography proceeds obliquely but precisely toward an accumulation of possible meanings. She is a connoisseur of unlikely but evocative details, of subliminally perceived, fragmentary images and events."

Jennifer Bolande, Milk Crown, cast porcelain, 2" high x 7" diameter with white glass plinth on 41" x 17" x 17" pedestal, 1987.

Bolande's work belongs to the collections of the Museum of Modern Art (MoMA), Museum of Contemporary Art, Los Angeles (MOCA), Centre Pompidou, and San Francisco Museum of Modern Art (SFMOMA). She has exhibited at MOCA, the Whitney Museum, Museo Nacional Centro de Arte Reina Sofía, Museum of Contemporary Art, Chicago and MAMCO, among others. In 2007, she received a Guggenheim Fellowship. She is emerita professor at UCLA and is based in Los Angeles and Joshua Tree, California.

== Education and career ==
Bolande was born in 1957 in Cleveland, Ohio. She earned a BFA from NSCAD University. After initially working in dance, choreography and drawing, she turned to found material from the media and urban landscape, influenced by the 1977 Artists Space exhibition, "Pictures." She received recognition for this work in the 1980s and 1990s through solo exhibitions at The Kitchen, Artists Space, Gallery Nature Morte and Metro Pictures in New York, and Margo Leavin in Los Angeles.

Bolande's later solo exhibitions have taken place at MoMA PS1, John Gibson Gallery, Alexander and Bonin and Magenta Plains in New York, Pio Pico Gallery (Los Angeles), Fotohof (Salzburg), Kunstraum Munich and Kunsthalle Palazzo (Switzerland), among others. Her 2010 retrospective at INOVA (Institute of Visual Arts) traveled to the Institute of Contemporary Art, Philadelphia and the Cal State LA Luckman Gallery. A monograph, Jennifer Bolande, Landmarks, was published in conjunction with the retrospective. She was also featured in the inaugural Desert X biennial (2017) and a MoMA screening of two of her films in 2022.

== Work and reception ==
The foundation of Bolande's art has been an inductive, often additive process operating in the space between photography and sculpture. Her inquiries often involve perception and the quirkiness of physical phenomena, exploring subjects across different media, while marking and collapsing distinctions between objects, images, memory and embodied experience. There is often a sense of filmic expectation and potentiality in her work, of events just completed or about to occur; some writers have deemed them "frozen movies." While certain tendencies in Bolande's art link her to the Pictures Generation (media consciousness, appropriation), critics note qualities that set the work apart from that group's cool criticality and slickness: its warm, often absurd humor and lack of cynicism; a near-obsessive attachment to idiosyncratic subjects; a funky, cast-off, lo-fi aesthetic; and an elusive inner logic.

Jennifer Bolande, Earthquake, washers, dryers, speakers, film, screen and sound (audio and video components), 71.25" x 68.25" x 68", 2004.

=== Photographic and assemblage works, 1980–2008 ===
In the 1980s, Bolande's art centered on found image and object assemblages that New York Times critic Holland Cotter described as "a kind of controlled recycling characterized by low-key wit, lively inventiveness and a subtle eye for metaphor." The work explored processes of reproduction and reception involving sound and sight, accumulating oblique meanings by stacking, resizing and reframing fragmentary, intangible and peripheral events and motifs—among them, the ignored furniture in porn movies, inert Marshall amplifiers and speaker cones, vintage refrigerator doors. Her exhibitions often functioned like catalogues of ideas: piled binary relationships involving texture and color, points of simultaneous meeting and division, dichotomies of medium, and emotional and psychological oppositions whose syntactic richness suggested poetry lines and verses (e.g., Stack of Shims and Marshall's Stack, 1987). Milk Crown (1987) was an early exemplar of her method, exploring an image through a "life cycle" of various physical and experiential states. It was a delicate cast-porcelain rendering of Harold Edgerton's iconic, high-speed 1957 image of a splashing milk drop in which she converted the ephemeral into the solidly permanent, commenting on the original's effort to capture the invisible.

In subsequent works, Bolande paired related motifs to different effect. Her exhibition "Road Movie" (1995) played with boundaries between real and aesthetic objects, juxtaposing photographs of brightly colored, full-sized trucks in odd formations with shots of toy trucks, their scale indicated by a human index, such as a finger; arranged in a kind of jump-cut sequence, the images suggested the sense of narrative and total control endemic to both film direction and child's play. Appliance House (1998–99) matched two 1950s relics once premised on newness and defined by the cube—Lever House, the eponymous soap company's landmark International Style office tower, and a cut-rate Lower East Side appliance store—each representing opposite ends of Manhattan's East Side and the laundry-soap business. The architectural, stainless-steel framed sculpture featured backlit night photographs of windows revealing high-modernist office interiors or rows of used washing machines that Artforum's Katy Siegel noted for their "spooky melancholy," humanity and loneliness.

In Earthquake (2004), Bolande revisited the cube, loudspeakers and washer/dryers in two rhyming works—a film and a stacked assemblage. Her "Smoke Screens" exhibition (2008) featured small groups of tinted photographic prints of smoke placed on large sheets of plywood. She played the Rorschach-like textures of the wood grain off those of the prints; a conical plaster tabletop sculpture, Plume (2007), froze an image of smoke in form and time.

=== Public artworks ===
Jennifer Bolande, Visible Distance/Second Sight, site-specific billboard installation, 2017, Coachella Valley, CA.

Bolande reprised the plywood visual theme in her first public-art project, Plywood Curtains (2010), a series of installations presented in vacated storefronts throughout Los Angeles. Inviting both a double take and acknowledgment of an ongoing economic downturn in viewers, she hung drapery printed with the graphic image of plywood inside the empty windows, mimicking the familiar sight of boarded-up storefronts.

The site-specific Desert X project, Visible Distance/Second Sight (2017), invited another double take that encapsulated Bolande's collapsing of images, the cinematic and embodied experience. It consisted of three double-sided highway billboards that reproduced her enlarged photographs of the distant San Jacinto, Santa Rosa and San Bernardino mountain ranges. They were placed and scaled in order to facilitate what critic Christopher Knight called a "fleeting, disconcerting moment" for drivers in which "the wordless pictures line up exactly with the approaching view."

=== Later exhibitions ===
Bolande's project "The Composition of Decomposition" (2018–20) offered a subtle elegy on newspapers and the news itself. It began with Image Tomb (2014), an examination of history as a vertical accumulation of layers, represented by a stack of New York Times newspapers through which she tunneled by cutting a deep rectangular channel to excavate a picture of skeletons below. She used the excised pieces to create the project's centerpiece, a film composed of roughly 400 pairs of side-by-side fragments ordered in their original sequence, which appeared and faded in a rhythmic flow set to a score of percussive found and synthesized sounds. Los Angeles Times critic Leah Ollman called it a "subtly provocative" new form—evoking found poetry and early modernist abstractions—that "reduced the Times to a confetti of elusive clues" revealing connections of unexpected depth.

In the exhibition, "Persistence of Vision" (2023), Bolande presented photographs of patiently observed, impermanent moments (often interventions of light), near-topographic portraits of single white facial tissues ("Monoliths"), and plaster sculptures of iceberg- or cliff-like forms ("Drifts") that visually rhymed with the tissue images.

== Collections and recognition ==
Bolande's work belongs to the public collections of the Centre Pompidou, Hammer Museum, Israel Museum (Jerusalem), Los Angeles County Museum of Art, MAMCO (Geneva), Milwaukee Museum of Art, Moderna Museet (Stockholm), MOCA (LA), Museum of Fine Arts, Boston, MoMA, Palm Springs Art Museum, Pérez Art Museum Miami, and SFMOMA.

She has received a John Simon Guggenheim Memorial Foundation fellowship and grants from the Canada Council, Tesuque Foundation, New York Foundation for the Arts, Elizabeth Firestone Graham Foundation, Durfee Foundation and Andy Warhol Foundation.

Jennifer Bolande is represented by the New York City gallery Magenta Plains.
