= Christopher Williams (American artist) =

American conceptual artist and fine-art photographer

Christopher Williams (born 1956 in Los Angeles) is an American conceptual artist and fine-art photographer who lives in Cologne and works in Düsseldorf.

== Early life and education ==
Williams was born in 1956 in Los Angeles, California. His father worked in Hollywood as a special effects artist. In the 1970s and early 1980s, he studied at the California Institute of the Arts where he received his B.F.A. and M.F.A. under the first generation of West Coast conceptual artists including John Baldessari, Michael Asher, and Douglas Huebler.

== Work ==
Writing in Artforum in 2007, art critic Tim Griffin described Williams's approach as sociophotographic but more generally can be described as a political and historical practice. It has been said that Williams works within the tradition of institutional critique within what Sven Lütticken describes as an informal group, along with Willem de Rooij, Jeroen de Rijke and Mathias Poledna, that investigates the "parameters of the exhibition space." Chronologically, however, he belongs to The Pictures Generation. In 1982 Williams had his first solo exhibition at Jancar Kuhlenschmidt Gallery in Los Angeles. Angola to Vietnam is a photography portfolio of glass flowers.

In 2000, at an exhibition at David Zwirner Gallery, in New York, Williams showed twenty photographs including a series of pictures of a 1964 Renault automobile on its side. Writing in The New York Times, Ken Johnson said, "the Renault was made in a French factory where significant revolutionary activities took place in 1968; hence it is tipped up like a barricade."

Williams' photographs oftentimes show increasingly obsolescent film-based equipment—cameras, lenses and darkroom gear—as beautiful and precise as catalog product shots. The accompanying text adds detail about how the equipment was used. Made by a professional photographer who follows Williams's directions, the conventionally scaled pictures have the glossy lucidity of commercial photographs.

== Educator ==
Since October 2008 he has been a professor in photography at the Kunstakademie Düsseldorf.

== Personal life ==
Williams' wife Ann Goldstein is curator and deputy director and chair of modern and contemporary art at the Art Institute of Chicago.

== Publications ==
- Christopher Williams: The production Line of Happiness. ISBN 978-0300203905. Exhibition catalogue.
  - London: Whitechapel Gallery, 2014.
  - Walther König, 2014.
- Christopher Williams: Printed in Germany. Walther König, 2014. ISBN 978-3863356002. Exhibition catalogue.

== Exhibitions ==
=== Solo exhibitions ===
- 2005: Secession, Vienna
- 2005: Kunstverein Braunschweig, Germany
- 2006: Museu Serralves, Porto, Portugal
- 2007: Kunsthalle Zürich
- 2010: Staatliche Kunsthalle Baden-Baden, Germany
- 2010: Bergen Kunsthall, Norway
- 2011: Museum Morsbroich, Leverkusen, Germany
- 2011: Museum Dhondt-Dhaenens, Deurle, Belgium
- 2013: Christopher Williams: For Example: Dix-Huit Leçons Sur La Société Industrielle (Revision 18), David Zwirner, London
- 2014 at The Art Institute of Chicago and traveled to The Museum of Modern Art, New York
- 2020: Christopher Williams Model: Kochgeschirre, Kinder, Viet Nam (Angepasst zum Benutzen), C/O Berlin, Berlin
- 2024: Christopher Williams: Radio/Rauhfaser/Television, Neubauer Collegium, Chicago
- 2025: Christopher Williams: Blocking Templates, Fahrbereitschaft, Haubrok Foundation, Berlin
- 2025: Christopher Williams: Hand Painted Signs, Photographs, Long Play Vinyl, Audiophile Bar, Printed Matter, The Perimeter, London

=== Exhibitions with others ===
- 2013: 55th Venice Biennale, curated by Massimiliano Gioni

== Awards ==
- 2005: Guggenheim Fellowship from the John Simon Guggenheim Memorial Foundation
- 2005–2006: Foundation for Contemporary Arts Grants to Artists Award
- 2014: Photography Catalogue of the Year, Paris Photo–Aperture Foundation PhotoBook Awards for Christopher Williams: The Production Line of Happiness and Christopher Williams: Printed in Germany.

== Literature ==
- Burton, Johanna. “Christopher Williams at David Zwirner.” Artforum (May 2008): 376-377.
- Ekeberg, Jonas. “Fotografiets Utvidete Felft Photography’s Expanded Field.” OM FOTOGRAFI (2005): 3-11.
- Godfrey, Mark. “Christopher Williams.” Artforum (May 2007): 366.
- Lütticken, Sven. “Gegen die Wand.” Texte Zur Kunst (June 2009): 121-123.
- Rattemeyer, Christian. “Christopher Williams.” Parkett No. 77 (2006):155.
