= David Askevold =

Canadian artist

- Born: March 30, 1940; Montana, United States
- Died: 23 January 2008 (aged 67)
- Education: University of Montana, Brooklyn Museum Art School, Kansas City Art Institute
- Known for: Experimental art
- Movement: Conceptual art

David Askevold (30 March 1940 – 23 January 2008) was born in Montana and was an experimental artist who lived in Nova Scotia.

Askevold studied art and anthropology at the University of Montana. In 1963, he won a Max Beckmann Scholarship to study painting for a year at the Brooklyn Museum Art School in New York. In 1966, he enrolled at the Kansas City Art Institute to complete a Bachelor of Fine Arts degree, in Sculpture. Askevold went to Halifax and joined the faculty of the Nova Scotia College of Art and Design in 1968, where he worked on and off until 1992.

== Projects Class ==
As a teacher at Nova Scotia College of Art and Design in the 1970s, David Askevold developed and led what he called the Projects Class. In what was identified as "the most innovative and interesting aspect of the NSCAD curriculum of the period," (Gil McElroy, ARTSatlantic, Spring/Summer 1996). Askevold selected artists, including Dan Graham, Lawrence Weiner, Robert Smithson, Lucy Lippard, Joseph Kosuth and Mel Bochner and invited them to submit projects that he and his students would then carry out. In the Fall of 1969, Robert Barry proposed that the students get together and "decide on a single common idea. The idea can be of any nature, simple or complex ..." Sol LeWitt presented a "to do" list for the class which included: "1. A work that uses the idea of error 2. A work that uses the idea of incompleteness 3. A work that uses the idea of infinity. ..." Robert Smithson suggested a work that would involve mud being dumped over a cliff. Lawrence Weiner asked students to "remove" some unspecified thing "Halfway Between the Equator and the North Pole."

== Artwork ==
His artwork, often manifested on videotape, is usually the result of a non-strategy based on favorable happenstance, collaboration, and selected circumstance. This method evokes those used by many younger artists today, such as Dave Muller and Rirkrit Tiravanija, who invite the unscripted, unchoreographed participation of others as a necessary part of their artistic practice.

In the late 1970s and early 1980s, he taught at Art Center College of Design in Pasadena, CalArts in Valencia, and the University of California, Irvine. Askevold showed at Los Angeles Contemporary Exhibitions in 1983 in a group show entitled Head Hunters. He had solo shows at the Thomas Lewallen Gallery in Los Angeles in 1978, the Jancar Kuhlenschmidt Gallery in Los Angeles in 1981, and a survey entitled Selected Works 1972–1976 at the University of California, Irvine in 1976. His group shows in the area include Reconsidering the Art Object 1965–1975 at MOCA (1995) and Michael Asher, Richard Long, and David Askevold at Los Angeles Institute of Contemporary Art (1977). At the 1977 Documenta 6 exhibition at Kassel, Askevold showed Muse Extracts, a 13-part photo text piece of ghost-like photographic reflections of the artist's head and torso taken at a pond near Crystal Crescent Beach in Nova Scotia.

In 1985, while teaching as a visiting artist in media arts in Minneapolis, Askevold collaborated with students to produce his only music video, a tape of two songs by the rock and roll band Hüsker Dü.

In the later years of 1990, he experimented with digital art, using computer-generated images and videos.

His works are held in the National Gallery of Canada, the Museum of Contemporary Art, Los Angeles and the Hammer Museum Los Angeles.
