= Jancar Kuhlenschmidt Gallery =

Jancar Kuhlenschmidt Gallery was a contemporary art gallery located in Los Angeles, California, that was open from May 1980 through June 1982.

== Overview ==
Tom Jancar inspired by Claire Copley Gallery, which had closed in 1977, opened Jancar Kuhlenschmidt Gallery with partner Richard Kuhlenschmidt in May 1980. Jancar Kuhlenschmidt Gallery was interested in showing important work that was not shown anywhere else and not necessarily for sale, which according to Winnifred Oak, set them apart from commercial art galleries that were driven by sales. Jancar Kuhlenschmidt Gallery showed works by Los Angeles and New York artists who had little previous exposure or were little known prior to their solo exhibitions at the gallery. Artists exhibited include David Amico, David Askevold, Jerry Brane, Kim Hubbard, Louise Lawler, William Leavitt, Richard Prince, Morgan Thomas, Paul Tzanetopoulos, and Christopher Williams. Jancar Kuhlenschmidt Gallery primarily hosted solo exhibitions with the exception of two group shows, a thrift store painting show and their last exhibition in which they featured works by all of the artists who had shown with them since 1980.

Howard Singerman reviewed David Askevold's solo exhibition "Delville's Visit", after Jean Delville, in Artweek, stating that the work is intentionally ambiguous and makes the viewer contend with the mysticism of Symbolism that still permeates his art. These sentiments were echoed in Howard Singerman's Artforum review of this same exhibition published three months later but this time Singerman goes a step further to suggest that Askevold's work actually tries to position the Symbolists in relation to Postmodernism because they offer a critique of Modernism, just as Askevold does with his installation "Delville's Visit".

Art critic Hunter Drohojowska reviewed the solo exhibition by Richard Prince for pick of the week, in LA Weekly, discussing how he re–presents images that already exist in the world, much like Pop Art but different in that Prince's images make us feel uncomfortable. Christopher Knight reviews Prince's show, in Los Angeles Herald Examiner, referring to the works as appropriated imagery because he reframes advertising images and he compares Prince's works to that of two other shows that concurrently show appropriated imagery.

Kathi Norklun reviewed Christopher Williams' work as pick of the week for LA Weekly explaining that the artist created a show that focused on the play between the imagery and the text asking the viewer to draw connections between the two to understand its larger meaning.

Andrea Fraser wrote about Louise Lawler's work and mentioned, in Art in America, how Lawler's work was a representation of institutional critique because she reiterating the name of the gallery, Jancar Kuhlenschmidt, by spelling out each letter of their names in small framed photographs on the gallery wall and nearby she required the gallerists to stand showing photographs of hers from a small portfolio box. Louise Lawler's solo debut at Jancar/Kuhlenschimdt was highlighted as one of the shows to have seen by David Rimanelli who in 2003 wrote an Artforum article looking back at the most important shows of the 1980s.

Catalog L.A. Birth of an Art Capital 1955–1985, which accompanied the exhibition Los Angeles 1955–1985: A Birth of an Artistic Capital and was organized by Catherine Grenier in 2006 at the Centre Georges Pompidou, includes a timeline highlighting various art exhibitions including five that took place at Jancar/Kuhlenschmidt Gallery: the opening of Jancar/Kuhlenschmidt Gallery in May 1980; David Askevold’s solo exhibition in January 1981; the group exhibition titled Thrift Store Paintings in 1981; William Leavitt’s solo exhibition in 1982; and a featured spread on Christopher William’s solo exhibition titled Source, The Photographic Archive, John F. Kennedy Presidential Library and Museum in 1982.

The gallery held its last exhibition in June 1982. It was located at 4121 Wilshire Blvd. in the basement of the Los Altos Apartments.
