= Louise Lawler =

American artist and photographer

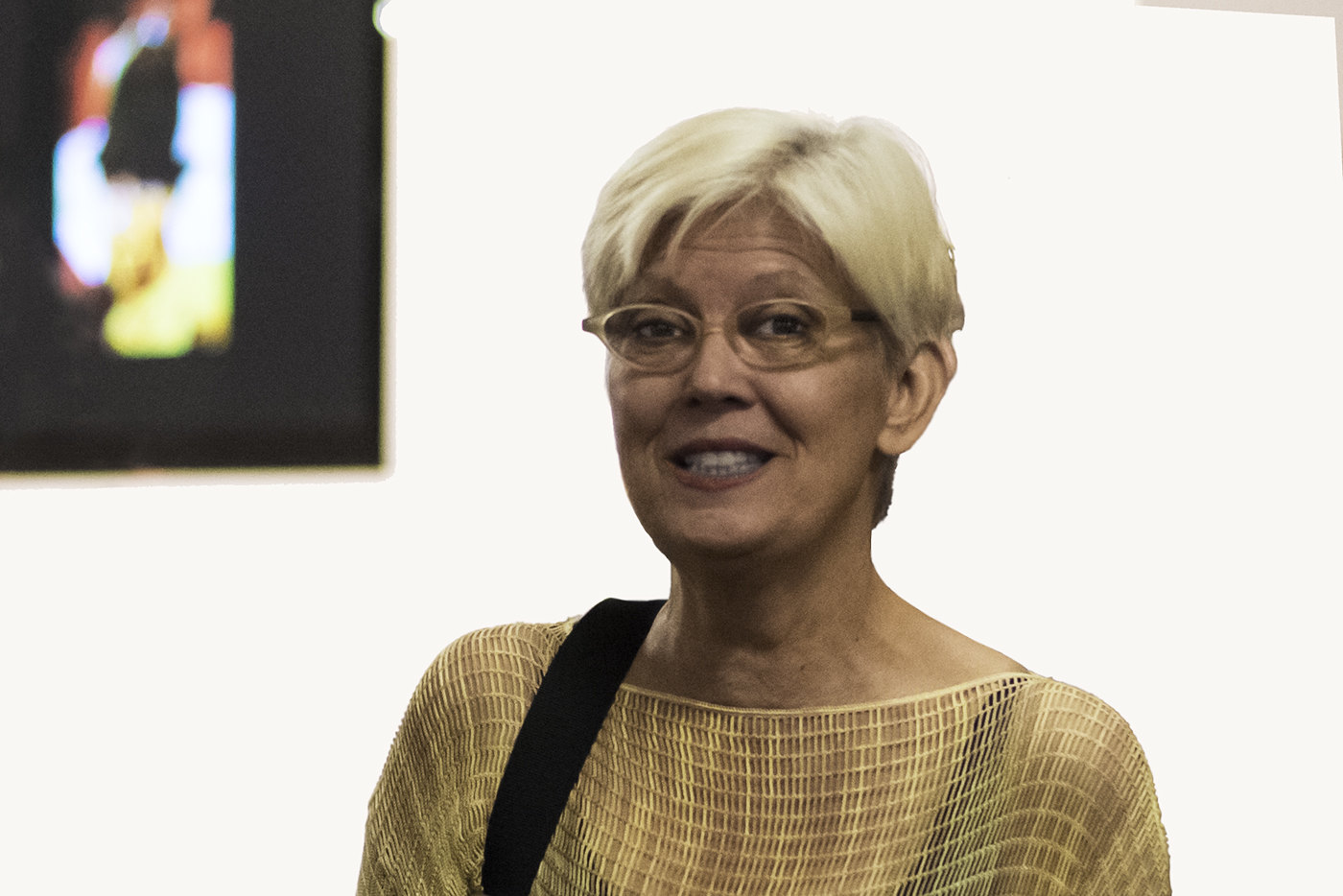
- Born: 1947 (age 78–79); Bronxville, New York, U.S.
- Education: Cornell University (BFA)
- Occupations: Artist, Photographer
- Years active: 1972–present

Louise Lawler (born 1947) is a U.S. artist and photographer living in Brooklyn, New York City. Lawler’s work has focused on photographing portraits of other artists’ work, giving special attention to the spaces in which they are placed and methods used to make them. Examples of Lawler's photographs include images of paintings hanging on the walls of a museum, paintings on the walls of an art collector's opulent home, artwork in the process of being installed in a gallery, and sculptures in a gallery being viewed by spectators.

Along with artists like Cindy Sherman, Laurie Simmons and Barbara Kruger, Lawler is considered to be part of the Pictures Generation.

== Early life and education ==
Lawler was born in 1947 in Bronxville, New York. She attended Cornell University, where she graduated with a Bachelor of Fine Arts.

== Career ==
In 1969, after graduating from Cornell University, Lawler moved to Manhattan, where she took a job at the Castelli Gallery. While there, she met Janelle Reiring, who went on to co-found Metro Pictures with Helene Winer in 1980.

Lawler has photographed pictures and objects in collectors’ homes, in galleries, on the walls of auction houses, and off the walls, in museum storage. Along with photography, she has created conceptual and installation art. Some of her works, such as the "Book of Matches", are ephemeral and explore the passing of time, while others, such as Helms Amendment (963) (1989), are expressly political. Lawler's work, in its diverse manifestations (installations, events, publications, souvenirs...) addresses or confronts prevailing systems of establishing art, taste and style. She is, however, less interested in the original process of creating a work of art than in the context lying beyond the artist's sphere of influence and in which the work is subsequently situated. Often framed as appropriation art or institutional critique, Lawler’s photographic work lays bare the day-to-day operations of the art world and its circulation and presentation of art works. Her work is interested in the intersection of art and commerce.

Birdcalls (1972/2008) is an audio artwork that transforms the names of famous male artists into a bird song, parroting names such as Artschwager, Beuys, Ruscha and Warhol, a mockery of conditions of privilege and recognition given to male artists at that time. The piece has been nicknamed "Patriarchal Roll Call."

During her time working at Castelli Gallery, Lawler was making paintings, artist’s books, prints, and photographs of her own. However, when she landed her first official gallery exhibition, in 1978 at Artists Space, she did not exhibit any of that work. Instead, she borrowed a small 1883 portrait of a horse from Aqueduct Racetrack — it had been hanging over a Xerox machine in the offices — and mounted it on an empty wall at the gallery. To highlight her appropriation, she installed two spotlights: one above the picture and another pointed out the window, at the building next door, hinting to sidewalk passersby that there was something of note going on upstairs. This particular building was moreover a Citibank. It therefore added an economical meaning to the concept.

In 1979, Lawler presented A Movie Will Be Shown Without the Picture at Aero Theater in Santa Monica, California. As the full-length soundtrack of The Misfits played, the silver screen remained unremittingly blank. A black card announcing the event stated the (self-explanatory) title of the work, and the venue and date of its screening. The artist has reprised the piece on a handful of occasions, including in 1983 at the Bleecker Street Cinema in New York City (using the 1961 film The Hustler and the 1957 Bugs Bunny cartoon What’s Opera, Doc?) as part of a show organized by Robert Barry at the downtown alternative space Franklin Furnace called “In Other Words: Artists Use of Language” and, in 1987, in the C.W. Post College in a show organized by Bob Nickas called “Perverted in Language.” The piece was also performed as part of West of Rome’s “Women in the City” series curated by Emi Fontana at the Aero Theater in 2008, and in Amsterdam in 2012 at The Movies theater with Saturday Night Fever (1977). In 1994, Lawler created Foreground, and presented it in Tate Gallery in 2009.

Lawler developed her individual style during the early 1980s, a time of intense growth in the overall economy and in the art market. In 1981 Lawler had her first West Coast gallery solo exhibition at Jancar Kuhlenschmidt Gallery in Los Angeles. In 1982, for her first solo exhibition at Metro Pictures, Lawler showed a small suite of artworks pulled from the gallery’s stockroom. The pieces were to be sold together, as a single work called Arranged by Louise Lawler, and it was priced at the literal sum of its parts, plus an extra 10 percent commission for Lawler; the piece did not sell.

Lawler's greatest coup came in 1984, when she was granted full access to the New York City and Connecticut residences of twentieth-century collectors Burton and Emily Hall Tremaine. This opportunity occurred on the occasion of the 1984 Tremaine Collection exhibition, and Lawler was again invited to take photos of some artworks in that context. Further, this occurred just a few years before a significant part of their collection was auctioned at Christie's in 1988, and Lawler was permitted to take photos of some of the Tremaine works at auction. In this series of work, Lawler photographed Jackson Pollock's Frieze (1953–55) and the filigree of a Limoges soup bowl in the Tremaines' New York dining room. In Living Room Corner, Arranged by Mr. & Mrs. Burton Tremaine, New York City (1984), Robert Delaunay's Premier disque (1912) hangs above a television and a Roy Lichtenstein bust, Ceramic head with blue shadow (1966), which has been turned into a lamp, and seems to stare up and outward. The location was the Tremaines' New York living room. Another work in this series is Monogram (1984), taken in a bedroom in the Tremaines' New York apartment, the monogram "ETH" being Emily Hall Tremaine, with Jasper Johns White flag (1955–58) photographed over the bed. The pieces place valuable works among household objects, exploring how environments shape our "reading" of art.

Regarding other works, Fragment/Frame/Text (#163) (1984), Lawler photographed a museum wall label next to a landscape painting by Claude Lorrain; only a fragment of the landscape appears in the photo. In Foreground (1994), a gelatin silver print showing an open-plan living area in the Chicago apartment of art collector Stefan Edlis, Jeff Koons' Rabbit (1986) can be seen next to a refrigerator. By manipulating the focus and the view-finder of the camera, Lawler demonstrated how an artwork is determined by the paradigms of the art world: A label on the wall of an auction house would become the focus of an image, with only a small fraction of the work itself visible, and the idea of the artwork as a commercial entity would be brought to mind.

Photographing at Art Basel and Art Basel Miami Beach fairs, the Museum of Modern Art, Christie's and various galleries, Lawler later presented a behind-the-scenes view of art: the hoisting of a Richard Serra sculpture attended by uniformed handlers; white-gloved hands carefully transporting a Gerhard Richter painting; Maurizio Cattelan's giant Picasso head swathed in plastic sitting on the floor behind its disconnected body; another Richter painting lying on its side propped against the wall, its public exposure at MoMA at an end; a Damien Hirst spin-painting glimpsed through a closet door. Lawler titled her 2004 survey show at Museum für Gegenwartskunst in Basel "Louise Lawler and Others" in acknowledgement of the artists whose artworks she photographs. Lawler created Not the way you remembered (Venice) for the exhibition "Sequence One: Painting and Sculpture from the François Pinault Collection (2006–07)"; rather than contributing discrete artworks, these photographs were taken of the exhibition’s early installation process in Venice, depicting works of art in their shipping crates, besides pieces of foam or bubble wrap.

=== Recent projects ===
For a site-specific collaboration with fellow artist Liam Gillick at Casey Kaplan Gallery in 2013, Lawler contributed a long vinyl wall sticker that linked the three rooms of the gallery. The image printed on it was a stretched-out version of some of her earlier photographs of artworks in bland white-box settings; here, pieces by Edgar Degas, Richard Serra and Gerhard Richter, among others, were distorted beyond recognition into unrecognisable streaks of colour.

For the 15th installation in a series of artist-designed 25-by-75-foot billboards at the High Line, Lawler created Triangle (adjusted to fit) (2008/2009/2011), an image photographed in a room at Sotheby's auction house in New York, and itself featuring works by artists Donald Judd, Frank Stella and Sol LeWitt.

== Exhibitions ==
Lawler has had one-person exhibitions at the Museum of Modern Art, New York (2017); Museum Ludwig, Cologne (2013); Wexner Center for the Arts, Columbus, Ohio (2006); Dia:Beacon, Beacon, New York (2005); the Museum für Gegenwartskunst, Basel (2004); Portikus, Frankfurt (2003); the Hirshhorn Museum and Sculpture Garden, Washington, D.C. (1997); and The Museum of Modern Art, New York, New York (1987). Her work has recently been featured in exhibitions at the Art Institute of Chicago, the Stedelijk Museum in Amsterdam, the Museum of Fine Arts in Ghent, Belgium, and the Whitney Museum of American Art in New York, which included her in its 1991, 2000, and 2008 biennials. Lawler's work was included in documenta 12, Kassel, Germany. Lawler has regularly presented her work in non-art contexts that employ "ordinary" means of presentation, distribution and interpretation.

Lawler has been represented by Metro Pictures, New York, since 1982. She is also represented by Yvon Lambert Gallery, Paris, and by Sprüth Magers, Berlin.

== Collections ==
Pieces by the artist are in the collections of the Museum of Modern Art, the Whitney Museum of American Art, the Guggenheim Museum, LACMA; Museum of Contemporary Art, Los Angeles; Art Institute of Chicago; Museum of Fine Arts, Boston; Walker Art Center, Minneapolis; Tate Britain, London; Centre Georges Pompidou, Paris; Israel Museum, Tel Aviv; Kunsthalle Hamburg; Moderna Museet, Stockholm; Museet for Samtidskunst, Oslo; Museum Boymans-van Beuningen, Rotterdam; and Yale University Art Gallery, New Haven, Connecticut.

== Art market ==
Estimated at $40,000 to $60,000, Lawler's photograph Monogram Arranged by Mr. and Mrs. Burton Tremaine, New York City 1984, a photograph of a perfectly made bed with Jasper Johns's famous White Flag (1955–1958) hanging above it, sold for $125,600, a record for the artist, in 2004.

== Books ==
=== Artists' books ===
- 1981 Passage to the North, a structure by Lawrence Weiner and photographs by Louise Lawler, New York: Tongue Press
- 1978 Untitled, Black/White, (text by Janelle Reiring), New York
- 1978 Untitled, Red/Blue, New York
- 1972 Untitled, (with Joanne Caring), New York: The Roseprint Detective Club

=== Books ===
- Louise, Lawler (2006). Twice Untitled and Other Pictures (looking back). The MIT Press. ISBN 0-262-62206-8.
- Louise Lawler and Others, Hatje Cantz Verlag, 2004, ISBN 3-7757-1420-0
- Louise Lawler: An Arrangement of Pictures, (essay by Johannes Meinhardt, interview with Louise Lawler by Douglas Crimp), Assouline, Paris/ New York, 2000
- Louise Lawler, Monochrome, (essay by Phyllis Rosenzweig), Washington: Hirshhorn Museum and Sculpture Garden, 1997
- Louise Lawler – For Sale, (essays by Dietmar Elger, Thomas Weski), Leipzig: Reihe Cantz, 1994
