= Richard Prince =

American painter and photographer (born 1949)

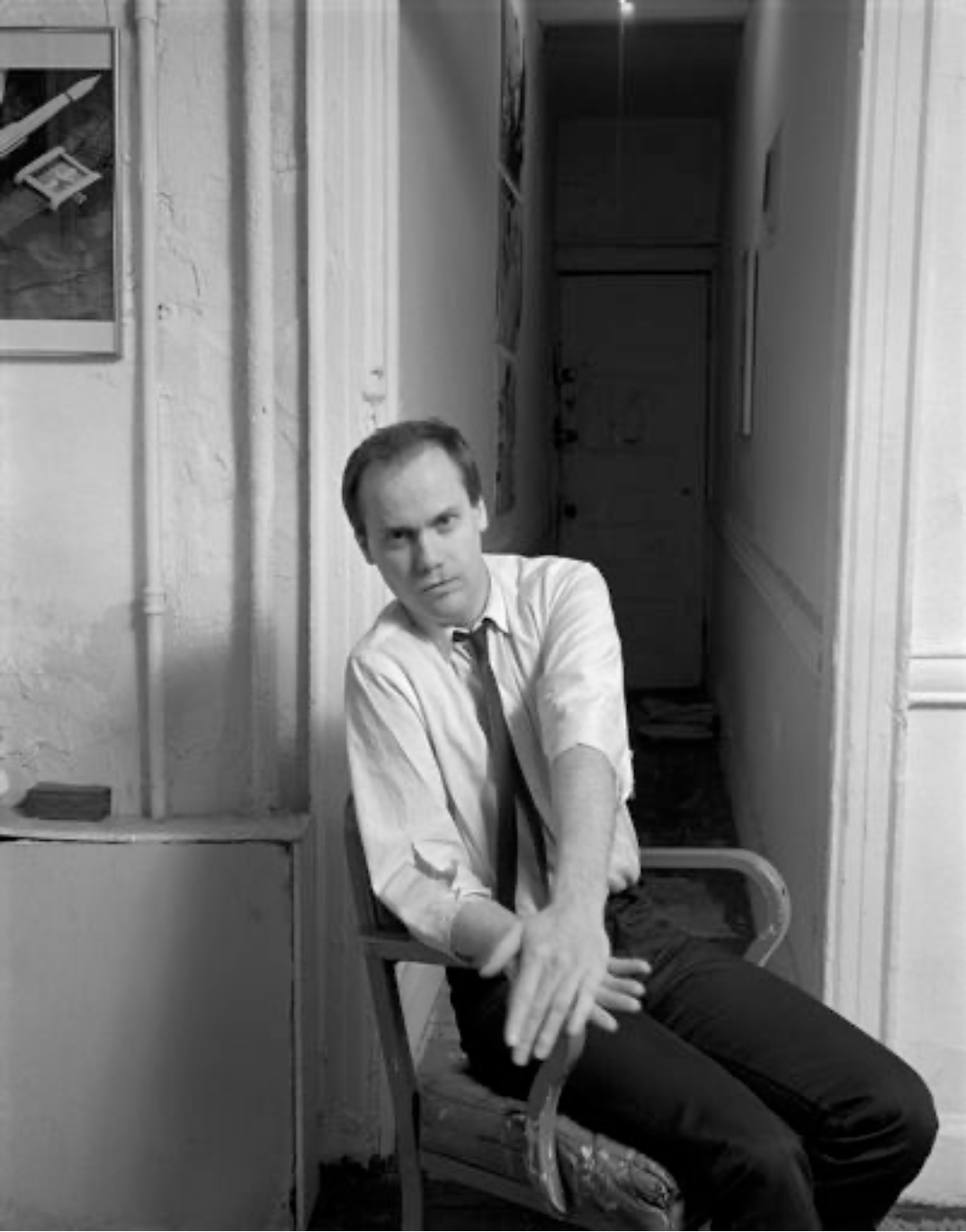
- Prince in his studio in New York City in 1983
- Born: August 6, 1949 (age 77); Panama Canal Zone, U.S.
- Known for: Photography, painting
- Movement: The Pictures Generation
- Website: richardprince.com

Richard Prince (born August 6, 1949) is an American conceptual artist and pop artist who rose to prominence in the 1980s in the East Village, Manhattan. He is best known for depicting models, living room furniture, watches, pens, and jewellery using rephotography and appropriation to reflect American pop culture. Prince has been the subject of major survey exhibitions, including the Whitney Museum of American Art, New York (1992); San Francisco Museum of Modern Art (1993); Museum Boijmans van Beuningen, Rotterdam (1993); Museum für Gegenwartskunst, Basel (2001, traveled to Kunsthalle Zürich and Kunstmuseum Wolfsburg); Solomon R. Guggenheim Museum (2007, traveled to the Walker Art Center, Minneapolis, 2008); and Serpentine Gallery, London (2008). Prince has been considered by some as "one of the most revered artists of his generation", according to The New York Times.

== Early life ==
Richard Prince was born on the 6th of August 1949, in the U.S.-controlled Panama Canal Zone, now part of the Republic of Panama. During an interview in 2000 with Julie L. Belcove, he responded to the question of why his parents were in the Zone, by saying "they worked for the government." Prince was first interested in the art of the American abstract expressionist Jackson Pollock. "I was very attracted to the idea of someone who was by themselves, fairly antisocial, kind of a loner, someone who was noncollaborative." Prince grew up during the height of Pollock's career, making his work accessible. The 1956 Time magazine article dubbing Pollock "Jack the Dripper" made the thought of pursuing art as career possible. After finishing high school in 1967, Prince set off for Europe at age 18. Prince has said that his attraction to New York was instigated by the famous photograph of Franz Kline gazing out the window of his 14th Street studio. Prince described the picture as "a man content to be alone, pursuing the outside world from the sanctum of his studio."

In 1973, Prince moved to New York and joined publishing company Time Inc. His job at the Time Inc. library involved providing the company's various magazines with tear sheets of articles.

== Work and career ==
Prince's first solo exhibition took place in June 1980 during a residency at the CEPA gallery in Buffalo, New York. His short book Menthol Wars was published as part of the residency. In 1981 Prince had his first West Coast solo exhibition at Jancar Kuhlenschmidt Gallery in Los Angeles. In 1985, he spent four months making art in a rented house in Venice, Los Angeles. Prince had very little experience with photography, but he has said in interviews that all he needed was a subject, the medium would follow, whether it be paint and brush or camera and film. He compared his new method of searching out interesting advertisements to "beachcombing." His first series during this time focused on models, living room furniture, watches, pens, and jewellery. Pop culture became the focus of his work. Prince described his experience of appropriation thus:

"At first it was pretty reckless. Plagiarizing someone else’s photograph, making a new picture effortlessly. Making the exposure, looking through the lens and clicking, felt like an unwelling . . . a whole new history without the old one. It absolutely destroyed any associations I had experienced with putting things together. And of course the whole thing about the naturalness of the film’s ability to appropriate. I always thought it had a lot to do with having a chip on your shoulder."

In the late 1980s, Prince, like his contemporaries Lorna Simpson and Barbara Kruger, as well as many of his Conceptual Art precursors, played with image and text in a strategy that was becoming increasingly popular. Prince put jokes among cartoons, often from The New Yorker. On the topic of found photographs, Prince said, "Oceans without surfers, cowboys without Marlboros…Even though I’m aware of the classicism of the images. I seem to go after images that I don’t quite believe. And, I try to re-present them even more unbelievably."

=== Spiritual America ===
In November 1983, Prince along with then girlfriend Kimberley Fine opened a short-lived art gallery named Spiritual America in New York's Lower East Side. The only initial exhibit was a photograph of the same name, which was a photograph of one of Garry Gross' photos of 10-year-old Brooke Shields standing naked in a bathtub, displayed in a "cheap gold frame". Prince himself referred to the image as an "extremely complicated photo of a naked girl who looks like a boy made up to look like a woman". The gallery had another show entitled "POP", though the contents of both this exhibition and the closing of the gallery some time later remain uncertain.

Despite initially only attracting a singular brief press mention, the namesake photo however has had a longer legacy. When a Prince print of Shields was included in his 2009 Spiritual America exhibit at the Tate Modern, it created a stir. It was removed from an exhibition after a warning from the police. Prince created a numbered series of 10 prints (and two artists proofs) measuring 20 inches by 24 inches (50.8 cm x 60.9 cm) of his reproduction of the Gross/Shields photo. In May 2014, copy #10 of Prince's reproduction of the Gross photo was auctioned off by Christie's, fetching a price of $3.97 million. This surpassed his previous high for a photo of $3.4 million, set at Sotheby's New York in 2007.

=== Untitled Cowboys ===
Untitled (Cowboy) has since been credited by Time magazine as one of the "Top 100 most influential images of all time." The image is set in the Western U.S., in an arid landscapes with stone outcrops flanked by cacti and tumbleweeds, with a backdrop of sunset. The advertisements were staged with the utmost attention to detail. Taken from Marlboro cigarette advertisements of the Marlboro Man, they represent an idealized figure of American masculinity and question how original and realistic the commercial depiction of a "macho man on the horse" is. The Marlboro Man was the iconic equivalent of later brands like Ralph Lauren, which used the polo pony image to identify and associate its brand. "Every week. I'd see one and be like, Oh that's mine, Thank you," Prince stated in an interview. Prince extrapolated in conversation with Steve Lafreiniere published in Artforum in 2003: "I had limited technical skills regarding the camera. Actually I had no skills. I played the camera. I used a cheap commercial lab to blow up the pictures. I made editions of two. I never went into a darkroom."

=== Jokes, Gangs, and Hoods ===
Prince paid homage to "sex, drugs, and rock'n'roll" in American niches as seen through magazines. He depicted subcultures such as the motorcycle-obsessed, hot rod enthusiasts, surfers, and heavy metal music fans. Prince's made his first Joke painting circa 1985, in New York, when he was living in the back room of 303 Gallery located on Park Avenue South.

In a 2000 interview with Julie L. Belcove, Prince called the joke paintings "what I wanted to become known for." When asked to identify the artistic genre of his Jokes, Prince responded, "the Joke paintings are abstract. Especially in Europe, if you can't speak English."

=== Cars ===
An untitled work consists of the body of a 1970 Dodge Challenger and high-performance parts such as a 660 hp Hemi engine, custom interior, black wheel wells, 14-inch tires in the front and 16 inch in the back, a pale orange paint job with a flat black T/A hood, as well as various decals and emblems. Another car sculpture, called American Prayer, is a 1968 Dodge Charger that has been completely emptied of any engine parts and interiors and is stripped of any paint and then powder coated. In place of the engine block there is a cement block.

=== Nurse Paintings ===
The Nurse Paintings are a series inspired by the covers and titles of inexpensive novels that were commonly sold at newspaper stands and delis (pulp romance novels). They debuted in 2003 at Barbara Gladstone Galleries, who along with Larry Gagosian, represents Prince. On 18 June 2021, the painting Runaway Nurse (2005–2006) fetched a record-breaking 93,986,000 HKD (US$12,121,000) at Sotheby's, in Hong Kong.

=== Memorabilia ===
Prince has built up a large collection of Beat books and papers. Prince owns several copies of On the Road by Jack Kerouac, including one inscribed to Kerouac's mother, one famously read on The Steve Allen Show, the original proof copy of the book and an original galley, as well as the copy owned by Neal Cassady (the Dean Moriarty character in the book), with Cassady's signature and marginal notes.

== Litigation ==
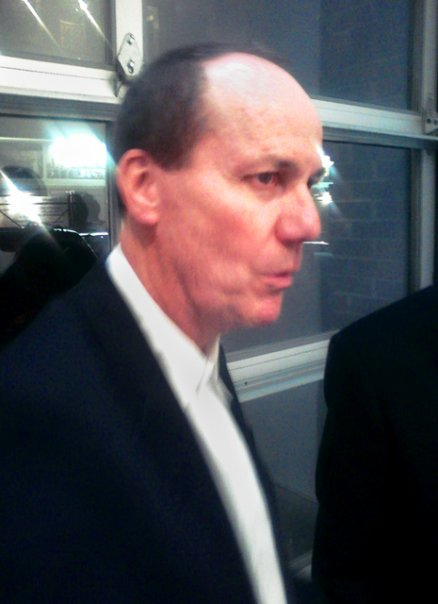
Prince in 2008

While Prince re-contextualizes images by others to redefine them, he has also failed to acknowledge those preceding photographers whose work he appropriates. For the Untitled (Cowboy) Series, this includes Norm Clasen and a handful of others. Clasen has expressed being aggrieved over the failure to attribute his work saying: "If you see somebody's copied your work, there's something deep down in you that says "I'm the author of that."'

=== Patrick Cariou copyright infringement suit ===
In December 2008, photographer Patrick Cariou filed suit against Prince, Gagosian Gallery, Lawrence Gagosian and Rizzoli International Publications in Federal district court for copyright infringement in work shown at Prince's Canal Zone exhibit at the Gagosian gallery. Prince was charged with wrongfully appropriating 35 photographs made by Cariou. Several of the pieces were barely changed by Prince. Prince also made 28 paintings that included images from Cariou's Yes Rasta book. The book featured a series of photographs of Rastafarians that Cariou had taken in Jamaica.

On March 18, 2011, US District Judge Deborah A. Batts ruled against Prince, Gagosian Gallery, Inc., and Lawrence Gagosian. The court found that the use by Prince was not fair use (his primary defence), and Cariou's issue of liability for copyright infringement was granted in its entirety. The court cited much case law including the Rogers v. Koons case of 1992. On April 25, 2013, the US Court of Appeals for the Second Circuit reversed Judge Batts's ruling, stating that Prince's use of the photographs in 25 works was transformative and thus fair use. Five less transformative works were sent back to the lower court for review. The case was settled in 2014.

=== Appropriation of Emily Ratajkowski's Image ===
In 2014, Prince took one of Emily Ratajkowski's Instagram posts without her consent and included the image in his "New Portraits" exhibition at the Gagosian Gallery in New York. Seven years later, Ratajkowski took a photograph of herself standing in front of the painting, and created a non-fungible token (NFT) from it. The NFT sold at auction at Christie's for $175,000. "I hope to symbolically set a precedent for women and ownership online, one that allows for women to have ongoing authority over their image and to receive rightful compensation for its usage and distribution," Ratajkowski wrote on Twitter. Ratajkowski describes the event in the popular essay for The Cut, titled "Buying Myself Back". The controversy raises questions about personality rights and who gets to benefit from the use of one's image.

=== Eric McNatt and Donald Graham infringement suits ===
In 2016, photographer Donald Graham sued Prince for violating the copyright on his 1998 photograph, Rastafarian Smoking a Joint by including the photograph in his "New Portraits" series. In May 2023, a New York judge ruled that Prince's artwork Untitled (Portrait of Rastajay92) was not "transformative" enough to shield Prince from litigation, and that Graham's copyright infringement case can proceed to trial. Photographer Eric McNatt similarly sued Prince in 2016 for infringing on his copyright to his portrait of Kim Gordon, co-founder of the band Sonic Youth. On January 26, 2024, the two linked cases were settled, with damages awarded to Graham and McNatt, but without any admission of infringement by Prince. In 2025, Prince exhibited a recording of his deposition from the case as a video artwork titled Deposition.

== Notable exhibitions ==
"Richard Prince: American Prayer," an exhibition of American literature and ephemera from the artist's collection, was on view at the Bibliothèque nationale de France, Paris in 2011. Prince's work has also appeared numerous group exhibitions, including in Bienal de São Paulo (1983), Whitney Biennial (1985, 1987, 1997, and 2004), Biennale of Sydney (1986), Venice Biennale (1988 and 2007), and documenta 9 (1992).

== Personal life ==
Prince lives in New York with his wife, the artist Noel Grunwaldt.

== Bibliography ==
- O'Brien, Glenn et al. Richard Prince, Solomon R. Guggenheim Museum, New York, 2007. ISBN 978-0-89207-363-4
- Collings, Matthew, Richard Prince Nurse Paintings, DAP, New York, 2004. ISBN 0-9703422-1-7
- Newman, Michael (2007). Richard Prince: Untitled (couple). The MIT Press. ISBN 978-1-84638-003-7.
- Women. Hatje Cantz, Berlin, 2004. ISBN 3-7757-1451-0
- Rian, Jeff, Rosetta Brooks, Lucy Sante, Richard Prince, Phaidon, 2004. ISBN 978-0-7148-4164-9
- American English, Verlag der Buchhandlung Walther Konig, Cologne, 2003. ISBN 3-88375-717-9. Photos of American and English first editions.
- 4 × 4. Korinsha Press & Co., 1997. Reprinted by Powerhouse Books, 1999. ISBN 1-57687-034-0. Book of photos, also includes interview of Prince with Larry Clark.
- Adult Comedy Action Drama. Scalo, 1995. ISBN 1-881616-36-3. Book of photos.
- Prince, Richard. "Inside World." Kent Fine Art, New York, 1989.

== See also ==
- Just Another Asshole
- Metro Pictures Gallery
