= Claire Copley Gallery =

Former art gallery in Los Angeles, California

The Claire S. Copley Gallery was an art gallery that existed from 1973 to 1977 on La Cienega Boulevard in Los Angeles, California, U.S.. Together with the galleries of Eugenia Butler, Rolf Nelson, Nick Wilder, and Riko Mizuno, the Claire Copley Gallery played an important role in the Los Angeles art scene of the 1960s and 1970s. The gallery provided a venue for emerging American and European minimalist and Conceptual artists, among them Bas Jan Ader, Terry Allen, Michael Asher, Daniel Buren, Jan Dibbets, Ger Van Elk, On Kawara, Joseph Kosuth, David Lamelas, William Leavitt, Allan McCollum, Allen Ruppersberg, and William Wegman.

== History ==
The Claire S. Copley Gallery was featured along with two other women-owned galleries (those of Eugenia Butler and Riko Mizuno) in a 2011 exhibition at the Crossroads School's Sam Francis Gallery, part of the Pacific Standard Time collaborative initiative organized by the Getty and featuring Los Angeles art from 1945-1980.

Copley's invitation to Michael Asher to launch his first American solo show in her space resulted in the work that the gallery may be best known for, the 1974 Installation where Asher removed the separating wall between the exhibition space and the back room storage and office areas. In addition, Asher intentionally left the walls of the gallery itself completely blank. According to Asher, "The idea was to integrate the two areas, so that the office area and its activities could be viewed from the exhibition area, and the exhibition area opened to the gallery directors' view." By exposing the gallery owner to viewers and viewers to the owner and without any additional art on display, Asher deliberately brought forth the usually hidden relationships existing between them.

By championing artists like Asher, Copley and other gallery owners at the time sought to challenge the reign of market forces by exhibiting works that couldn't be bought or sold. This stance in no small part led to the closing of the Copley Gallery after only a few years and to Copley's founding, along with Morgan Thomas and Connie Lewallen, of the non-profit Foundation for Art Resources, a non-profit organization dedicated to exhibiting unconventional work in public spaces.
