= Foundation for Art Resources =

- Abbreviation: FAR
- Formation: 1977
- Founder: Morgan Thomas; Connie Lewallen, and Claire Copley
- Type: Non profit
- Fields: Art
- Website: www.far-la.org

Foundation for Art Resources (FAR) was a Los Angeles-based, non-profit arts organization that facilitated the production and presentation of contemporary art projects outside of the gallery structure. It was founded in 1977 by gallerists Morgan Thomas, Constance Lewallen, and Claire Copley, who transferred leadership to the artist and mediator Dorit Cypis in 1979. One of the longest-running extant arts collective in Los Angeles with no exhibition space, FAR partnered with different private, public and educational institutions throughout Los Angeles to produce exhibitions, lectures, and performances with a focus on the relational structures between art, producers, and audience.

== History ==
Claire Copley, Morgan Thomas, and Connie Lewallen directed amongst the most innovative galleries in the Los Angeles area during the mid-seventies. Claire Copley Gallery on La Cienega Boulevard presented a range of American and international artists including Allen Ruppersberg, Michael Asher, Bas Jan Ader, William Leavitt, and Allan McCollum. ThomasLewallen Gallery in Santa Monica showed many of the artists associated with Cal Arts including Douglas Huebler, John Baldessari, Jack Goldstein, and Jonathan Borofsky.

=== Origin ===
Since the galleries were commercially unsuccessful, Thomas, Lewallen, and Copley developed the nonprofit organization Foundation for Art Resources, FAR, 1977, enabling them to work more flexibly with the artists they believed in. Without a permanent location to support FAR would be able to respond to the needs of each particular project, be it film, book, lecture, performance, or exhibition. Their first projects included the production of John Baldessari's film, Six Colorful Inside Jobs, the book and performance Open America by James Lee Byars, taking place in Los Angeles and New York simultaneously. In 1979, the three founders moved on to other pursuits and the direction of FAR was transferred to the artist Dorit Cypis who invited Christina Ritchie to join as partner.

=== Activities ===
In 1979 Cypis and Ritchie maintained the exhibition space that was handed to them giving it up a year later to innovate an exploration of partnership with venues across the city, to question what an artist practice has to do with civic space and the public. Between 1979-1982, they initiated collaborative partnerships amongst numerous private, public and educational institutions throughout Los Angeles, producing and presenting contemporary art as site-specific installation, publication, video, film, performance, dialogue, radio, and the lecture series Art Talk Art addressing theoretical and critical issues of contemporary art and culture. Art events and dialogues were produced in numerous public contexts including the International Design Center, Downtown Los Angeles Public Library, an abandoned residential site, neighborhood movie theaters, a shopping center, etc. Participating artists included Mike Kelly, David Askevold, Louise Lawler, Candace Lewis, Matt Mullican, Glen Branca, Michael Smith, Barbara Bloom, the Kuchar Brothers, Jenny Holzer, Edit DeAk, as well as writers/historians Howard Singerman, Christopher Knight, Ann Rorimer, Ingrid Sischy, and Benjamin Buchloh.

=== Structure ===
Since its origin, FAR had been overseen collaboratively by over 20 different groups of Board Members and 100 artist-Directors.

In 1980 Cypis and Ritchie initiated two major changes in FAR's internal governance: 1. traditional power dynamic of a Board of Directors over the working staff was changed by stipulating that members of the Board are the working members of FAR; 2. FAR would be handed over to a new working Board of young artists and cultural workers every three years. The goal was to structure the identity of FAR as unfixed, to challenge artist members to work collectively, and to always distribute power. Between 1976-2016 FAR had been in the hands of more than 20 different groups and over 100 cultural workers as working Board members. FAR was the longest existing art collective without an exhibition space in Los Angeles. There is growing cultural interest in collective structures for production and artists are increasingly working collectively and socially to meet public contexts. FAR members had been exploring this vision for 40 years.

== Activities ==
The FAR ran the FAR Bazaar 2017, an "alternative art fair and art collective festival" held at the Fine Arts complex at Cerritos College in Norwalk, CA.
