= Shape (disambiguation) =

Shape is the characteristic surface configuration of a thing; an outline or contour.

Shape may also refer to:

== Fictional characters ==
- Michael Myers (Halloween), or The Shape, a fictional character from the Halloween horror film franchise
- Shape (comics), a fictional character in the Marvel Comics universe
- The Shape Japer, a villain in the BBC television series Numberjacks

== Media ==
- Shape (magazine), a fitness magazine
- The Shape (book), a 2000 poetry collection by Dejan Stojanović
- "Shapes" (The X-Files), an episode of the TV series The X-Files

== Art ==
- Shape (visual arts), a flat, enclosed area of an artwork

== Music ==
=== Performers ===
- The Shapes (UK band), a 1970s punk rock band
- The Shapes, a UK experimental pop band fronted by Micachu
- The Shapes (US band), a 2000s American band that wrote and performed the theme song for the TV series Dallas SWAT

=== Albums ===
- Shape (album), a 1996 album by Frente!
- Shapes (album), a 1997 album by Polvo
- Shapes, a 1994 album by Greg Howard

=== Songs ===
- "Shape" (song), a song by Sugababes
- "Shape", a song by Joe Morris from Singularity
- "Shapes", a song by The Long Winters from When I Pretend to Fall
- "Shapes", a song by Alcohol Funnycar
- "The Shape", a song by Slipknot from Iowa

== Companies and organizations ==
- School for Higher and Professional Education, higher vocational education institution in Hong Kong
- Supreme Headquarters Allied Powers Europe (SHAPE), the central command of NATO military forces, Casteau, Belgium
- SHAPE America, working name of the Society of Health and Physical Educators, American organisation
- SHAPE Services, a German software vendor
- Shape Arts or simply Shape, a charity funded by Arts Council England

== Food ==
- Arnott's Shapes, a line of snack foods
- Blancmange or shape, a sweet dessert

== Other ==
- Shape (Go), a description of positional qualities of a group of stones in the game of Go
- SHAPE (molecular biology), Selective 2'-hydroxyl acylation analyzed by primer extension, a chemical-based RNA structure determination experiment
- Social Sciences, Humanities and the Arts for People and the Economy (SHAPE), an acronym for these academic disciplines
- Spectro-polarimetry of Habitable Planet Earth (SHAPE), scientific instrument onboard propulsion module of Chandrayaan-3
- shape parameter a kind of numerical parameter for a parametric family of probability distributions

== See also ==
- Shapefile, a geospatial vector data format for geographic information systems software
- Shape extension, in the X/Window System
- Shape:UK or Shapeshifters, a 2000s-2010s house music production duo
- The Shapes Project, an art project by Allan McCollum
