= Dorit Cypis =

Canadian-American artist, mediator and educator

Dorit Cypis דורית ציפיס
- Born: 1951 (age 74–75); Tel Aviv, Israel
- Education: California Institute of the Arts, Nova Scotia College of Art and Design, Pepperdine University
- Known for: Installation art, photography, performance, social practice
- Style: Conceptual, feminist
- Awards: Guggenheim Fellowship, National Endowment of the Arts, Robert Rauschenberg Foundation, City of Los Angeles
- Website: Dorit Cypis

Dorit Cypis (Hebrew: דורית ציפיס; born 1951, Tel Aviv) is a Canadian-American artist, mediator and educator based in Los Angeles. Her work has collectively explored themes of identity, history and social relations through installation art, photography, performance and social practice. After graduating from California Institute of the Arts (CalArts), she attracted attention in the 1980s and 1990s for her investigations of the female body, presented in immersive installation-performances at the Whitney Museum, International Center of Photography, San Francisco Museum of Modern Art (SFMOMA), and Musée d'art contemporain de Montréal. Counter to much feminist work of the time, Cypis focused on interiority and personal mythologies rather than exterior political realms, and according to art historian Elizabeth Armstrong, made a significant contribution to discourse about the representation of women and female sexuality.

Cypis's work has often moved between studio and social practice, including the direction and creation of initiatives in Minneapolis and Los Angeles bridging art and social change. As a mediator, she has worked in the Middle East and Los Angeles on conflict engagement issues including Arab-Jewish and police-community relations. Her later art has shifted toward broader considerations of identity related to history, memory, space and geopolitics, and been exhibited at the Los Angeles County Museum of Art (LACMA) and Orange County Museum of Art. Cypis has been recognized with a Guggenheim Fellowship and awards from the National Endowment of the Arts, Robert Rauschenberg Foundation, and City of Los Angeles, among others.

Dorit Cypis, X-Rayed (detail), in situ immersive media installation, Whitney Museum of American Art, 1988.

== Early life and career ==
Aya Dorit Cypis was born in Tel Aviv, Israel in 1951. In 1958, her family emigrated to Montreal, Canada. After exploring sociology at Sir George Williams University, she graduated with degrees in art education and fine art in 1974 from Nova Scotia College of Art and Design, studying with conceptual artists Garry Neill Kennedy and David Askevold. In 1977, she completed an MFA at Cal Arts, whose faculty at the time included Michael Asher and John Baldessari; among her early work was the feminist performative video, Exploring Comfort.

After graduating, Cypis directed Foundation for Art Resources (FAR), a Los Angeles nonprofit that partnered artists with private and public organizations to site art within the city from 1976 to 2016. She exhibited widely, including shows at The Clocktower Gallery, Artists Space and White Columns in New York and LACE in Los Angeles. In 1983, she moved to Minneapolis, and joined the faculty at Minneapolis College of Art and Design (1983–8). She eventually attracted wider attention for increasingly politicized work that was influenced by cinema, music and dance, with shows at the Whitney Museum, New Museum, SFMOMA, and Walker Art Center, among others. She also founded Kulture Klub Collaborative, a project involving artists and homeless teens that bridged creative expression and survival.

After returning to Los Angeles in 1999, Cypis taught at institutions including USC, CalArts, UCLA, and Otis College of Art and Design until 2018. In 2005, she completed a master's degree in Dispute Resolution (MDR) at Pepperdine University and has since worked as a mediator.

== Early performance, mixed-media artwork and social practice ==
Critics aligned the strategies of Cypis's early work (e.g., In Quest of the Impresario: Courage, 1982) with feminist artists such as Barbara Kruger and Dara Birnbaum, who sought to unmask and disrupt patriarchal systems of viewing and representation. By the mid-1980s, however, she moved beyond appropriation and pastiche to a deeper psychophysical engagement with the female body, representation and sexual identity, confronting social conventions with strategies of provocation, defamiliarization and stream-of-conscious association. She integrated photomontage and projection, performance and movement, sound and spectator involvement, often upending the roles of viewer and viewed. Writer Abigail Solomon-Godeau singled out this work as grounded in a "utopianism of the body" that staked out a corporeal reality beyond idealized, repressive representations as a site of self-possession and self-knowledge.

In multi-slide and sound pieces including Love After Death (1986), Cypis overlaid emotionally and psychologically loaded imagery—erotic photographs, borrowings from media, medicine, religion and Renaissance painting, haunting family snapshots, exotic travel slides—to create phantasmagoric installations that engulfed performers and spectators in a fluctuating tableau of audio and visual stimuli. Rather than re-invoke dominant cultural tropes, her imagery suggested multiple, equivalent meanings, role reversals involving gender and agency, and a concept of "self" extending beyond one's body and lifetime to other generations and the collective unconscious (e.g., Lucy and the Vampire; A Sacred Prostitute (one in herself), 1990).

Dorit Cypis, The Body in the Picture (Robert Randolph), C-Print photograph, stat, 40" x 30", one of multiple portrait series, 1993.

Cypis faced controversy for addressing themes of sexuality during an era of heightened culture-war tensions around art, sexuality, the AIDS crisis, funding and censorship. Her installation X-Rayed (1988, Whitney Museum) incorporated sound, performance and more than 300 images—one-third depicting a naked woman exploring her body through looking at book images and at herself. Challenging stereotypes, it explored both empowerment—whether a woman can possess her body while being looked at—and thorny, socially conditioned feelings of shame, guilt and repulsion; such feelings extended to the work's subject, who reacted publicly and threatened litigation to block its future presentation. A year later, Cypis produced X-Rayed, (altered), replicating the original images by substituting her own naked body for the model's. Artweek's Tony Reveaux described its choreography of imagery and gazes (of Cypis, the camera, and viewer) as "a beguiling and unnerving walk-through cubist self-portrait of sexual recognition and identity."

In subsequent exhibitions, Cypis broadened her examinations of identity, drawing comparisons to Carolee Schneemann and Cindy Sherman. With Yield (the body) (1989), she played with traditional, gendered notions of artist and model (and portrait and self-portrait), inviting four female photographers including Nan Goldin to photograph her unclothed in order to consider if how women look at a woman's body is informed by the male gaze. In the performance The Inquisition (1991), Cypis further questioned the cultural construction and distortion of sexuality by appearing in the role of "the inquisitor" questioning Miss Jones from the 1972 video The Devil in Miss Jones. For The Body in the Picture (1993), Cypis photographed participants physically interacting with projected autobiographical and media images that they chose; The Boston Globe deemed them "psychophotos—the capturing of the mind on emulsion."

== Later art, mediation and social practice ==
Cypis's later efforts, informed by her work with Kulture Klub Collaborative, turned from the gendered body to broader conceptions invoking history, memory, space and geopolitics. Framing Memories I Never Had (1998) interwove images of catastrophe (e.g., the Holocaust) and poetic intimacy in a cinema-like slideshow of overlapping frames, double projections and white-out dissolves. Other works used recurrent elements—mirrors and tactile, highly associative materials like feathers, raw sheep fleece and plywood—to create visually disorienting, ambiguous spaces and engage the body on social, psychological and phenomenological levels. The installations Out of Time (1998–2000) and Angel of Histories (2000) explored movement, ephemerality, mortality and human form, reproducing spectators' reflections through distorting mirrors, video feeds and scales that placed them both inside and outside the work.

In her early-2000s photography, Cypis investigated social and interior space, often using mirrors to disorient and collapse the distance between viewer and subject. The Prisoner's Dilemma series examined disempowerment in situations of limited knowledge (its title referencing the well-known game theory/negotiation scenario); the images depict Cypis staring into a one-way mirror from inside the temporary jail of a California court, with reflective surfaces and architectural disruptions creating a dislocating, panopticon-like environment. In her The Rest in Motion photographs and video, Cypis suggests human presence and psychic states through absence, relying on the sensual qualities of a windblown, billowing curtain in an oceanside window whose rhythmic push and pull evokes breath, restlessness, and freedom.

Dorit Cypis, Liberty (leading the people), installation, light-jet photograph and mirror, each 48" x 62", 2003.

Cypis turned to installations based on news images in the mid-2000s, which she recontextualized or recombined to yield new narratives. Liberty (leading the people) (2003) re-presents an altered image of male youth in Gaza fleeing tear gas, which is reflected (thus altered again) in a same-sized floor mirror. Stranded Subject (weekends) (2007) presented a series of dystopic images with a chronological timeline running beneath across gallery walls that referenced their original contexts and captions. In Sightlines (2006, LACMA), Cypis staged a dialogue of displaced looks using mirrors and photographs of sculptural likenesses she commissioned from a forensic scientist also working on the case of missing girls in Juarez, Mexico; the likenesses depict two women Cypis saw on a Newsweek cover, a Palestinian and a Jewish Israeli resembling one another who were both killed when the Palestinian detonated herself. Artforum critic David Joselit called it an "astute allegory of contemporary media (and politics) [that] demonstrates that the production of images may be an index of civic blockage rather than of social connection."

Cypis has since delved further into personal identity in relation to history, politics and society. The installation Foreign Exchanges: Galileo (2008) featured an image of a dark-skinned man peering through a telescope—Cypis's "Galileo"—facing clusters (like cells or galaxies) of mirrors and circular cropped photographs that he chose to represent him; the configuration implied a more nuanced, multi-perspective understanding of memory, myth and history in a balkanized era. In the exhibitions FabLab—The Artist and Her Archive (2010), A Symmetry (2011) and The Life of Life (2012), Cypis explored her own identity and family history through objects, snapshots, documents and text from her own and her family archives, including a timeline display, magician performance, and deck of playing cards. The Sighted See the Surface (2012–9)—a video installation, book, and body of subtle text prints that began as a memorial to mentor Michael Asher—weaves experiences over forty years, including 1970s Asher artwork, volunteer work at the Braille Institute for the Blind, and community-conflict dialogue facilitation.

Dorit Cypis, One Another, performance/audience as participants, media, props, lighting, Navel LA, 2019.

=== Mediation and educational work ===
Cypis's mediation work grew out of her artistic focus on identity, social relations, and increasingly, social justice. After earning her Dispute Resolution (MDR) master's degree, she founded Foreign Exchanges in 2006, an initiative that offered strategies to bridge personal and cultural differences by combining aesthetics, conflict resolution and somatic arts. In 2008, she became a founding member of Mediators Beyond Borders and served as chair of the organization's Middle East Initiative; her work there included a 2009 mediation visit to the Israeli village Neve Shalom–Wahat al-Salam following the Gaza War, in which she used sensorial walks to build trust.

Cypis has developed several public programs in Los Angeles, many involving communities and law enforcement. In 2014, after partnering with the Los Angeles Department of Human Relations to gain understanding of chronic community conflict, she co-founded North East Youth Council (NEYC) to build leadership skills for at-risk-youth, develop community projects, and improve relations with police. She has partnered with Days of Dialogue – The Future of Policing since 2015 as dialogue facilitator and has designed numerous forums on race and identity. In 2018, Cypis founded the platform PeoplesLab – transforming conflict into possibility, which employs somatic, perceptual, psychological and procedural communication skills-training to engage conflict and develop capacity for creative social-justice change. She presented One Another, an interactive presentation exploring strategies for intimate engagement across difference, in 2019 at NAVEL in Los Angeles.

In addition to teaching courses on identity, social relations and conflict transformation at higher learning institutions, Cypis has contributed essays on art and mediation to books (The Mediation Handbook: Research, Theory, and Practice, 2017), journals (Association for Conflict Resolution Magazine, East of Borneo), and institutions including the Walker Art Center.

== Recognition and collections ==
In 2014, Cypis was recognized with a Guggenheim Fellowship, a Robert Rauschenberg Foundation residency, and an SPArt Award for artists in the field of social practice. She has received multiple awards from the National Endowment of the Arts, Minnesota State Arts Board, McKnight Foundation and Jerome Foundation, and single awards from the Japan Foundation, Bush Foundation, Durfee Foundation, City of Los Angeles, Fellows of Contemporary Art, and American Jewish University.

Cypis's work belongs to the public collections of the International Center of Photography, National Gallery of Canada, Fonds régional d'art contemporain (FRAC) in France, Walker Art Center, Center for Creative Photography, Isabella Stewart Gardner Museum, and Orange County Museum of Art, among others.
