= Marcie Begleiter =

American filmmaker, author, and educator

- Born: Brooklyn, New York, USA
- Occupations: Director; Producer; Author; Educator
- Notable work: Eva Hesse (documentary; From Word to Image: Storyboarding and the Filmmaking Process (book)
- Spouse: Jeff Bilson
- Children: Zach Bilson
- Parents: Leo Begleiter; Bernice Begleiter
- Website: marciebegleiter.com

Marcie Begleiter is an American film director, artist, author, and educator.

== Early life and education ==
Begleiter was born in Brooklyn, New York. She is a graduate of Kirkland College and received an MFA at Art Center College of Design under the tutelage of Mike Kelley and Lita Albuquerque. Her father, Leo Begleiter, was an executive vice president of a division of Seagram and president of a division of Nabisco.

== Career ==
=== Eva Hesse documentary ===
Begleiter directed and produced the documentary Eva Hesse, which premiered in May 2015 at the Whitney Museum of American Art. The film explores the life and work of German-American postminimalist sculptor Eva Hesse. It includes material on a period in the summer of 1964 when Hesse experienced significant creative difficulties and sought support from fellow artist Sol LeWitt through correspondence. Begleiter’s research involved a four-year study, including the examination of Hesse's unpublished letters at the Allen Memorial Art Museum in Ohio. The documentary was co-produced by Karen Shapiro and Michael Aust and features interviews with artists Richard Serra, Carl Andre, Lucy Lippard, Nancy Holt, and Hesse’s former husband, Tom Doyle.

Eva Hesse highlights the artist's early life in Nazi Germany, her subsequent career in Manhattan's art community, and her unconventional use of industrial materials. The documentary incorporates animation and historical footage to illustrate autobiographical elements of Hesse's art and experiences. The narration is taken from her private writings and was voiced by Selma Blair.

The documentary received a theatrical release in 2016. It streamed on Netflix in 2017 and was broadcast in the US on the PBS series American Masters in August 2018. The film received critical acclaim during its run at New York's Film Forum.

=== Author and educator ===
Begleiter is also an author specializing in pre-visualization for filmmaking. Her book, From Word to Image: Storyboarding and the Filmmaking Process, was published in 2001 and provides guidance on visual storytelling techniques, script breakdown, and storyboard creation. Prior to publishing the book, Begleiter had 18 years of experience in the film industry, teaching at various art and film schools, and working in film, television, and interactive media. She also started Filmboards, a company that provided storyboard services to studios including Paramount, TriStar, New Line Cinema, and ABC.

Begleiter’s teaching experience includes positions at Art Center College of Design and Otis College of Art and Design where she was the founding director of Creative Change/ Integrated Learning, a college-wide program that pairs artist and design students with non-profit partners. She also taught in the American Film Institute, as well as seminars conducted at the Directors Guild of America. Her stage work, Meditations: Eva Hesse, debuted in Los Angeles in 2010 at the Highways Performance Space, depicting significant events in Hesse’s life through installation and performance.

== Artist and curator ==
As an artist and curator, Begleiter’s project "Echoes of Voynich: Coded Systems in Contemporary Art" was included in the Getty Institute’s Pacific Standard Time Series "Art and Science Collide" in 2024 and exhibited at the Wonzimer Gallery in Los Angeles. Her artwork has also been shown at the CICA Museum in Seoul, the Los Angeles Center for Photography, and the Millennium Film Workshop in Brooklyn.

She has been an Artist-in-Residence at Sitka Center for Art and Ecology and the Banff Center for the Arts in their Leighton Studio program. She has received grants from The Center for Cultural Innovation, the Foundation for Art Resources, and the National Endowment for the Arts through their partnership with Los Angeles Contemporary Exhibitions for the installation The Rise of Hip-Hop Civilization and its Discontents at the Hollywood Galaxy in 1992.
