= El Centinela =

El Centinela may refer to:

- El Centinela, the Spanish-language version of the Catholic Sentinel, published by the Oregon Catholic Press
- El Centinela (Baja California, Mexico), also known as Mount Signal, Baja California, Mexico mountain near California, United States and Mexicali
