= SpaceCollective =

- Available in: English
- Owner: Rene Daalder
- Creator: Rene Daalder
- Website: http://spacecollective.org
- Commercial: No
- Registration: optional
- Launched: End of 2007

SpaceCollective was a community driven website where information and ideas were exchanged about the state of the human species, Earth and the universe. The website, founded by film-maker Rene Daalder in collaboration with interactive designer Folkert Gorter, went public at the end of 2007, and saw a userbase of 2500 contributors at its peak. Gorter, in addition to acting as the site's interaction designer, is also the primary curator of the SpaceCollective Gallery, a showcase of images and texts. The system architecture and technology of the website were created by Josh Pangell. A series of videos was presented on the website called "The Future of Everything". These episodes were edited by Aaron Ohlmann and produced by American Scenes Inc; executive producer: Joseph Kaufman. The website's slogan was "Where forward thinking terrestrials exchange ideas and information about the state of the species, their planet and the universe, living the lives of science fiction today".

== History ==
The initial idea of SpaceCollective was to make a story driven website based on the idea of Carl Sagan's Voyager Golden Record, a time capsule that contains the life on Earth that was sent into space. But soon Rene Daalder realized that in a place of non-linearity and interactivity such a movie-like project wasn't going to work. Daalder teamed up with Folkert Gorter to build a website with intrinsic value of its own. Inspired by thinkers like Carl Sagan, Gene Roddenberry, Marshall McLuhan and Timothy Leary, who helped articulate the future by adopting a pop culture vernacular, they wanted to "use the online platform to do something similar for our times in a radically different interactive medium." They wanted to use the Internet to create updates of the Voyager Golden Record and beam them up in space every month. Because in 2006 the Internet shifted from primarily text-based to video-based they decided to create the video series called "The Future if Everything." In an interview with Volume Magazine, Rene Daalder said the goal of the project was: "The Internet and the larger digital realm of computer intelligence it connects with provide us with the blueprint for the future far before the physical world is able to follow its lead. And in the case of Space Collective we use all the information that is available online to help people see the forest for the trees, opening them up to new perspectives. There are lots of people with the desire to change the world, but they have been conditioned that that is an almost impossible ambition to accomplish.". The project shut down in 2022.

== Projects ==
A growing number of universities, architecture and design schools are conducting projects on SpaceCollective. Several of these courses are initiated by SpaceCollective, others are originated by the schools, who may opt to open them up to the public or restrict them to participation By Invite Only. The Public Projects, whether created by SpaceCollective or its members, are open to all registered users. One of these projects is "The Voyager update project".
