= Sand spike =

Bodies of calcite-cemented sandstone

Collection of museum quality sand spike specimens unearthed in Germany

Sand spikes (German: Zapfen, found within Zapfensande) are bodies of calcite-cemented sandstone in the shape of a pin or mace. They have primarily been found near Mount Signal around the Mexico-United States border and in the Molasse basin in Germany. They were historically classified as sand-calcite concretions, though a 2021 study argues they may be a form of seismite.

== Description ==
Sand spikes feature a bulbous cauliflower or botryoidal head that quickly tapers into a long cylindrical spike. The spikes can range in size from 1.5 inches (3.8 cm) to 3 feet (0.9 m). They are primarily composed of quartz, feldspar and mica and are cemented by calcite.

Sand spikes are found in groups generally pointing in the same horizontal direction. Near Mount Signal the tails are generally pointing west, away from the San Andreas Fault. The spikes in Germany point away from the Nördlinger Ries impact crater.

== History ==
Sand spikes in Germany were reported back as far as the 1820s. The spikes were documented in the United States by H. W. Nichols in 1906. While once widespread near Mount Signal, construction and other human activity has destroyed most of them.

== Formation ==
Multiple theories for how sand spikes form have been put forward over the years. Early explanations included that they are petrified plants or mushrooms. They have commonly been interpreted as concretions, formed by carbonate cementation and elongated in the direction of groundwater flow. A 2021 study proposed they may be a form of seismite created by intense seismic shaking caused by earthquakes or asteroid impacts.

== Gallery ==
Five sand spikes collected near Salton, California in the early 20th century

Sand spikes collected near Mt. Signal

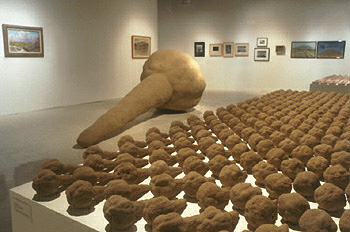
Sand spike art created by Allan McCollum

Sand spike next to sandstone on display in Naturmuseum Augsburg

1929 photo of sand spikes by Leo Hetzel from the Imperial Valley Pioneers' Museum archive
