= Here Is Always Somewhere Else =

- Directed by: Rene Daalder
- Written by: Rene Daalder
- Produced by: Rene Daalder; Aaron Ohlmann
- Cinematography: Nils Post; Aaron Ohlmann
- Edited by: Aaron Ohlmann; Rene Daalder
- Music by: Broadway Project
- Release date: April 13, 2007 (Wisconsin Film Festival)
- Running time: 78 minutes
- Countries: United States; Netherlands
- Languages: English; Dutch

Here Is Always Somewhere Else is a 2007 documentary film directed by Rene Daalder and co-produced and edited by Aaron Ohlmann.

The film is about the life and work of Dutch/Californian conceptual artist Bas Jan Ader, who in 1975 disappeared under mysterious circumstances at sea in the smallest boat ever to cross the Atlantic. As seen through the eyes of fellow emigrant filmmaker Rene Daalder, the picture becomes a sweeping overview of contemporary art films as well as an epic saga of the transformative powers of the ocean. Featuring work from artists Tacita Dean, Rodney Graham, Marcel Broodthaers, Ger van Elk, Charles Ray, Wim T. Schippers, Chris Burden, Fiona Tan, Pipilotti Rist and many others.

The film was released on DVD in November 2008.
