= Constance Lewallen =

American curator of art (1939–2022)

Constance Lewallen

Constance Lewallen (July 25, 1939 – April 24, 2022) was an American curator. She was curator at the Berkeley Art Museum and Pacific Film Archive. She was known for her support of Conceptual art and West Coast artists. Lewallen died on April 24, 2022, at the age of 82.

== Life and career ==
Lewallen (née Ehrlich) was born and raised in New York City. She attended Fieldston School followed by an undergraduate degree from Mount Holyoke College. She received a master's from San Diego State University in 1970.

Lewallen's first worked at Bykert Gallery in New York, where she met Michael Snow and Vito Acconci. After moving to Los Angeles, Lewallen worked for Cirrus Editions and Broxton Gallery (with Larry Gagosian). Lewallen then founded ThomasLewallen Gallery in Santa Monica with Morgan Thomas; the gallery showed many of the artists associated with Cal Arts, including Douglas Huebler, John Baldessari, Jack Goldstein, and Jonathan Borofsky. In 1977, Lewallen and Thomas along with gallerist Claire Copley, created the nonprofit Foundation for Art Resources to produce artist projects; one if its first projects was the production of John Baldessari's film Six Colorful Inside Jobs.

Lewallen moved to the Bay Area in 1979. She worked for the UC Berkeley Art Museum from 1980 until 2007; first as curator for the museum's MATRIX Program for Contemporary Art, then as Senior Curator (1998–2007). As MATRIX curator, she organized nearly 90 solo exhibitions by international artists, including Julian Schnabel, Chuck Close, Barbara Kruger, Hamish Fulton, Pat Steir, Elizabeth Murray, Jean Michel Basquiat, and Martin Puryear. Lewallen also worked as associate director of Crown Point Press, a fine-art printer and publisher, in the 1980s and 1990s. She was a contributing editor to the Brooklyn Rail.

In 2000 Lewallen was named a Gerbode Fellow by the Wallace Alexander Gerbode Foundation, which recognizes five individuals annually who have evidenced extraordinary commitment and accomplishment in the not-for-profit field.

Lewallen married poet Bill Berkson in the 1990s. Her previous two marriages, to San Francisco gallerist Thomas V. Meyer and New York artist Donald Lewallen, ended in divorce.

== Curatorial work ==
Lewallen was known for her work around the California Conceptual art movement of the 1970s. Her exhibitions helped to assert that Conceptual art had roots beyond New York City. State of Mind New California Art circa 1970, curated with Karen Moss in 2011, was a seminal contribution to the history of West Coast conceptualism. In 1980, Lewallen wrote a chronology for the San Francisco Museum of Modern Art about the development of conceptual art in the 1970s.

In addition to her work on conceptualism, Lewallen was known for her solo shows of single artists, including Theresa Hak Kyung Cha, Bruce Nauman, Joe Brainard, Jay DeFeo, and Paul Kos.

=== Selected List of Exhibitions ===
- 2022: Fluxus Reverb: Events, Scores, Boxes & More, BAMPFA. Conceived by Lewallen, completed after her death by Stephanie Cannizzo and Christina Yang
- 2020: Stephen Kaltenbach: The Beginning and the End, Manetti Shrem Museum, UC Davis (with Ted Mann).
- 2019: The Brief, Largely Subterranean History of the Reese Palley Gallery, San Francisco, 1969–1972, Cushion Works, SF (with Jordan Stein)
- 2019: Terry Fox: Resonance, a Bay Area, multi-venue celebration of the artist (with Dena Beard)
- 2019: Bruce Nauman, San Francisco Art Institute (with Katie Hood Morgan)
- 2016: David Ireland, San Francisco Art Institute (with Hesse McGraw)
- 2016: Mind Over Matter: Conceptual Art from the Collection, Berkeley Art Museum and Pacific Film Archive
- 2013: Fault Lines, Kadist, San Francisco
- 2012: State of Mind: New California Art circa 1970, Berkeley Art Museum and Pacific Film Archive, other venues (with Karen Moss)
- 2009: Allen Ruppersberg: You and Me or The Art of Give and Take, Santa Monica Museum of Art (with Elsa Longhauser)
- 2007: A Rose Has No Teeth: Bruce Nauman in the 1960s, Berkeley Art Museum and Pacific Film Archive. AICA Award of Excellence, Best Monographic Show Nationally, Second Place.
- 2004: Ant Farm 1968–1978, Berkeley Art Museum and Pacific Film Archive (with Steve Seid)
- 2004: Threshold: Byron Kim, 1990–2004, Berkeley Art Museum and Pacific Film Archive
- 2003: Everything Matters: Paul Kos, A Retrospective, Berkeley Art Museum and Pacific Film Archive, other venues
- 2002: Richard Misrach: Berkeley Work, Berkeley Art Museum and Pacific Film Archive
- 2001: The Dream of the Audience: Theresa Hak Kyung Cha (1951–1982), Berkeley Art Museum and Pacific Film Archive, other venues. The first retrospective of Theresa Hak Kyung Cha.
- 2001: Joe Brainard, A Retrospective, Berkeley Art Museum and Pacific Film Archive, MoMA PS1
- 2001: Alex Katz/Ed Ruscha, American Academy in Rome
- 1998: MATRIX/Berkeley: 20 Years, Berkeley Art Museum and Pacific Film Archive
- 1996–1997: Jay DeFeo: Selected Works 1952 to1989, Goldie Paley Gallery, Moore College of Art & Design, Philadelphia, and Berkeley Art Museum and Pacific Film Archive. Winner of 1997 AICA Award for Best Show in a Non-Profit Space
- 1995: Structure of Chance: John Cage, Mills College Art Gallery, Oakland
- 1994-95: Facing Eden: 100 Years of Bay Area Landscape, M.H. De Young Museum, San Francisco. Contributing curator responsible for section concerning Conceptual Art 1970- 1995.
- 1992: Mistaken Identities, University Art Museum, UC Santa Barbara, international venues (with Abigail Solomon-Godeau)
- 1986: MATRIX 102 / Bruce Conner, Berkeley Art Museum and Pacific Film Archive
- 1986: MATRIX 100 / Barbara Kruger, Untitled (We don't need another hero), Berkeley Art Museum and Pacific Film Archive
- 1986: MATRIX 94 / John Baldessari, Berkeley Art Museum and Pacific Film Archive
- 1985: MATRIX 89 / Nan Goldin, The Ballad of Sexual Dependency, Berkeley Art Museum and Pacific Film Archive (with Edith Kramer)
- 1985: MATRIX 86 / Martin Puryear, Berkeley Art Museum and Pacific Film Archive
- 1985: MATRIX 82 / Alice Neel, Berkeley Art Museum and Pacific Film Archive
- 1984: MATRIX 80 / Jean-Michel Basquiat, Berkeley Art Museum and Pacific Film Archive
- 1984: MATRIX 71 / Richard Artschwager Door }, Berkeley Art Museum and Pacific Film Archive
- 1983: MATRIX 68 / Robert Mangold, Berkeley Art Museum and Pacific Film Archive
- 1983: MATRIX 63 / Sol LeWitt, Berkeley Art Museum and Pacific Film Archive
- 1982: MATRIX 53 / Eva Hesse, Berkeley Art Museum and Pacific Film Archive
- 1982: MATRIX 50 / Chuck Close, Berkeley Art Museum and Pacific Film Archive
- 1981: MATRIX 46 / Francesco Clemente, Berkeley Art Museum and Pacific Film Archive
- 1981: MATRIX 43 / Enzo Mari, Berkeley Art Museum and Pacific Film Archive
- 1981: MATRIX 40 / Richard Diebenkorn, Berkeley Art Museum and Pacific Film Archive

== Publications ==
=== Books and exhibition catalogues ===
- Stephen Kaltenbach: The Beginning and The End. Published by Jan Shrem and Maria Manetti Shrem Museum of Art, 2020.
- (With Dore Bowen) Bruce Nauman: Spatial Encounters. Published by the University of California Press, 2019.
- 500 Capp Street: David Ireland’s House. Published by the University of California Press, 2015
- Bruce Nauman: Inside the White Cube. Published by White Cube, London, 2012
- (With Karen Moss) State of Mind: New California Art Circa 1970. Published by the University of California Press, 2011
- Editor and introduction, Theresa Hak Kyung Cha, Exilée and Temps Morts: Selected Works. Published by University of California Press, 2009/2022.
- A Rose Has No Teeth: Bruce Nauman in the 1960s. Published by UC Berkeley Art Museum & Pacific Film Archive, Berkeley, 2007
- (With Steve Seid) Ant Farm 1968–1978. Published by University of California Press, 2004.
- Everything Matters: Paul Kos, A Retrospective. Published by University of California, Berkeley Art Museum and Pacific Film Archive, 2003.
- The Dream of the Audience: Theresa Hak Kyung Cha, 1951–1982. Published by UC Berkeley Art Museum and University of California Press, 2001.
- Joe Brainard: A Retrospective. Published by UC Berkeley Art Museum and Granary Books, 2000
- Jay DeFeo: Selected Works, 1952–1989. Published by Goldie Paley Gallery, Moore College of Art and Design, Philadelphia, 1996
- (With Terry Fox) Terry Fox: Articulations (Labyrinth/Text Works). Published by Goldie Paley Gallery, Moore College of Art and Design, Philadelphia, 1992.

=== Articles, book chapters, and other contributions ===
- “San Francisco Art Institute: Its History and Future,” Gagosian Quarterly, Fall 2021
- Allen Ruppersberg Sourcebook: Reanimating the 20th Century. Published by Independent Curators International, 2014
- Larry Sultan & Mike Mandel. Published by D.A.P./Distributed Art Publishers, 2012
- Threshold: Byron Kim, 1990–2004. Published by University of California Press, 2004
- “John Cage’s Visual Work,” Here Comes Everybody: The Music, Poetry and Art of John Cage, ed. David. W. Bernstein and Christopher Hatch. Published by University of Chicago Press, 2000.
- “PARC: The First Year, The Xerox PARC Artist-in-Residence Program, ed. Craig Harris. Published by MIT Press, 1999.
- "Metaphor, Matter, Canvas, Stage: Conceptual Art 1968–1995," Facing Eden: 100 Years of Bay Area Landscape. Published by University of California Press and M.H. de Young Museum, San Francisco, 1995.
- “John Cage's Graphic Work,” du (a magazine of contemporary culture published in Zurich), 1992.
- Space, Time, Sound: Conceptual Art in the San Francisco Bay Area, The 1970s. Published by San Francisco Museum of Modern Art, 1981.
