= James G. Butler =

American lawyer

James Girard Butler (September 26, 1920 – May 26, 2005) was an American trial lawyer, known for winning many large verdicts for plaintiffs in civil litigation, including the first in a thalidomide case. Butler was also known as a civil rights leader and an art collector.

== Early life, education, and military service ==
Butler was born on September 26, 1920, in Elizabeth, New Jersey. His father, a postman, worked on a railway mail car.

Butler received his bachelor's degree from Saint Peter's College in Jersey City. In 1943, he enlisted in the Marine Corps, and served in the Pacific Theater of World War II as a fighter plane pilot. Butler received the Distinguished Flying Cross, Air Medal, three Gold Stars and five citations for bravery. During World War II, Butler became ill with malaria and was treated by a Marine nurse, Master Sergeant Eugenia Louise Jefferson. They married in 1945.

Butler attended Georgetown University Law Center and graduated in 1947.

== Career ==
As an attorney, Butler became known for his defective drugs products liability work. In 1971, he won a $2.75 million jury verdict against Richardson-Merrell, the company that tested thalidomide, which caused birth defects. The judgment was later reduced to $500,000. After the first case, Butler went on to serve as plaintiffs' counsel in about 20 more thalidomide cases.

Other notable cases in which Butler was counsel including litigation over Turkish Airlines Flight 981 (which crashed in Paris in 1974) and Pan Am Flight 73 (which was hijacked in Karachi, Pakistan).

Butler was a member of the Inner Circle of Advocates.

Butler was also known for his involvement in the civil rights movement. As a 35-year-old city attorney in 1955, Butler became the first vice president of the Compton NAACP. According to unofficial Compton NAACP historian Maxcy Filer, "The City Council even asked Jim Butler, 'What can we do about this NAACP?' Jim said, 'You accept it .... In fact, here's my membership card.' They all kind of kept quiet for about five minutes." In retaliation for Butler's involvement with the NAACP, the City Council attempted a recall effort, which narrowly failed. Butler remained involved with the Compton NAACP until 1958, when moved to the Hancock Park neighborhood, to a home originally built for Bernard Baruch. Butler lived in the home until he died in 2005.

== Personal life ==
Butler was an art collector and had a collection featuring several notable works, including that of James Lee Byars. His law offices on Wilshire Boulevard featured eight Andy Warhol lithographs of Marilyn Monroe and other significant works. Butler's daughter, Eugenia P. Butler, also became an artist, and her work was exhibited by the Otis College of Art and Design in 2003.

Butler married twice. His first marriage to art gallerist Eugenia Butler ended in 1970. His second marriage was to artist Morgan Thomas and lasted from late 1970s to 1989. He was survived by nine children and four grandchildren. According to the Los Angeles Times, Butler and his wife "raised their children to become political activists and were known for having an open house with a guest list that included members of the Black Panther Party," holding parties with friends from the art world and loud Caribbean music. On one occasion, a neighbor who led the John Birch Society in Southern California, circulated a petition asking the family to sell the house, and Eugenia, the eldest of Butler's children, sent her brother Justin to "tell them we are selling the house to the Black Panthers."

Butler was a collector of dictionaries.

== Death ==
Butler died in his sleep of cancer at his home on May 26, 2005, at age 84.
