= Viva Cuba Libre: Rap Is War =

- Film poster
- Directed by: Jesse Acevedo
- Produced by: Jesse Acevedo; Aaron Ohlmann
- Starring: Bian Oscar Rodríguez Gala; Aldo Roberto Rodríguez Baquero
- Edited by: Aaron Ohlmann
- Music by: Los Aldeanos
- Release date: March 2, 2013 (Miami International Film Festival)
- Running time: 87 minutes
- Language: English

Viva Cuba Libre: Rap is War is a 2013 feature-length documentary by Jesse Acevedo that tracks one of the most controversial hip hop groups in Latin America, as they face arrest and violent retribution for their politicized music.

Screened in over sixty festivals, it premiered at the Miami International Film Festival, was featured by Amnesty International in the Movies That Matter Festival, won the Jury Award at the Prague Human Rights Film Fest, and received the DocU Award Nomination at IDFA.
