= Eugenia P. Butler =

American artist (1947–2008)

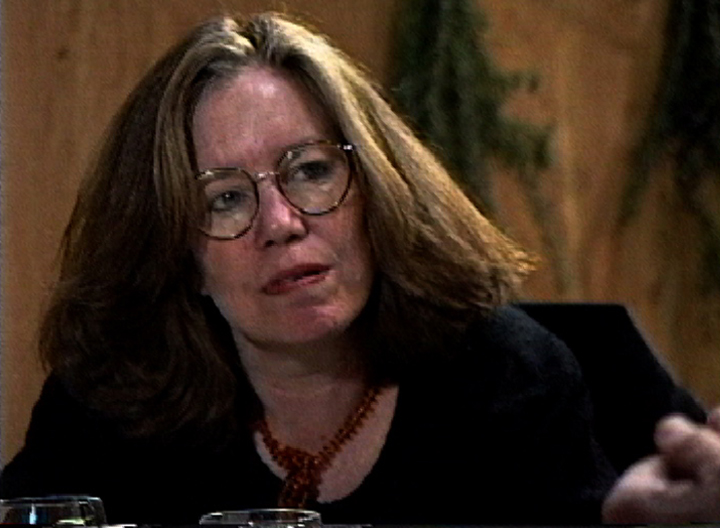
- Artist Eugenia P. Butler during her 1993 project, The Kitchen Table during Art/LA '93 at the Los Angeles Convention Center
- Born: Eugenia Perpetua Butler; January 30, 1947; Washington, D.C.
- Died: 29 March 2008 (aged 61); Santa Rosa, California
- Movement: conceptual art, contemporary art
- Website: http://www.eugeniapbutler.com

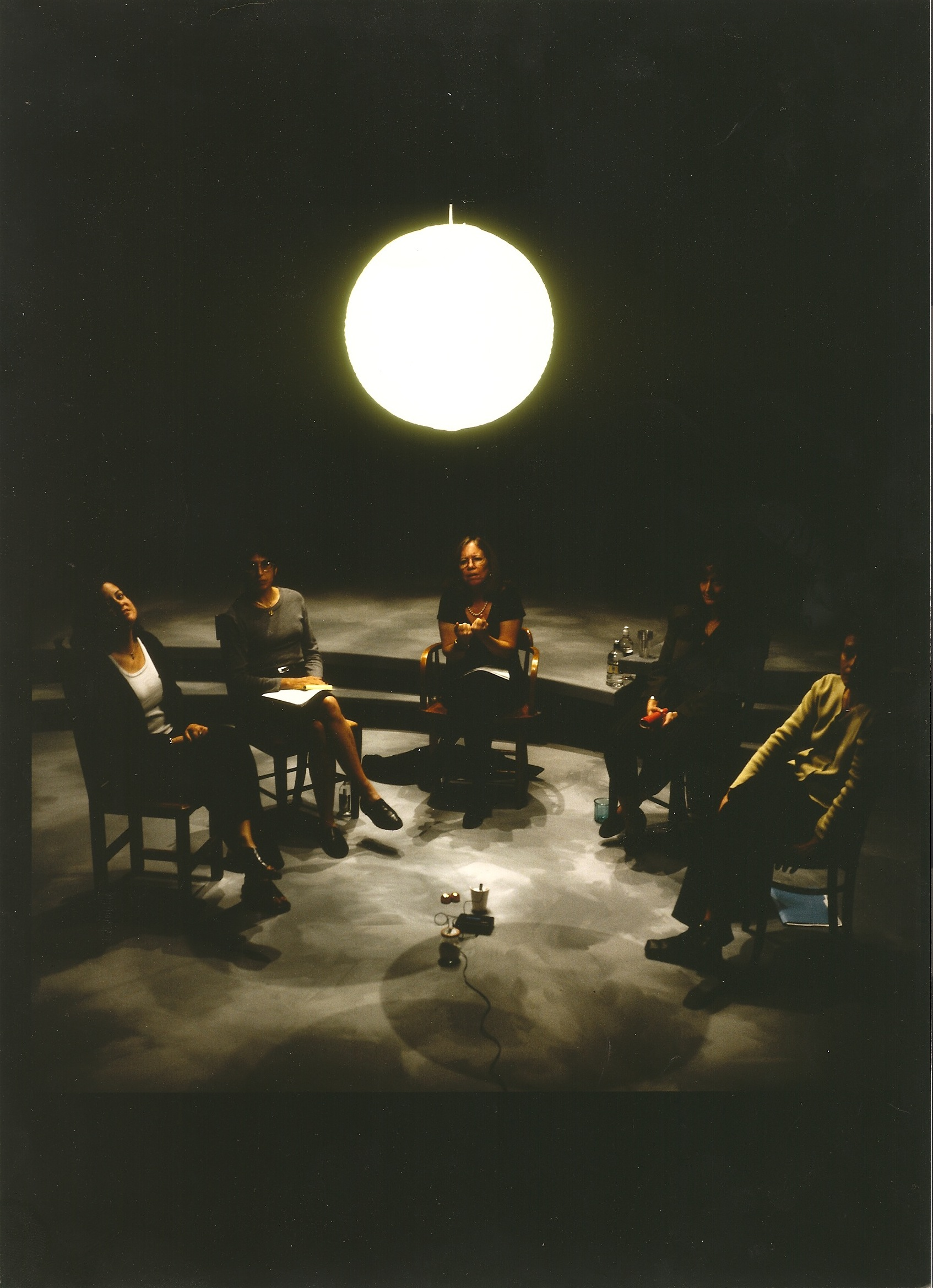
Eugenia P. Butler during her 2004 performance Find Big Mind at the Clark Memorial Library in Los Angeles

Eugenia Perpetua Butler (1947–2008) was an American conceptual artist. In 1993 she hosted "The Kitchen Table," a series of eight conversations with twenty-six artists at Art/LA93. Held at a hidden booth at the art fair and live-streamed to fair attendees, the conversations included Allan Kaprow, John Outterbridge, Carolee Schneemann, Suzanne Lacy, Felipe Ehrenberg, Marina Abramovic, Monica Mayer, Joan Jonas, and more.

Butler saw success in her early career with inclusion in the fourth edition of documenta in 1968, and the exhibition Kinzeption/Conception in 1969 at Leverkusen State Museum in Germany. In a 2004 Artforum review of her 35-year retrospective Arc of an Idea: Chasing the invisible, critic Christopher Miles says of her earlier works, "Butler’s short descriptive phrases or bits of text on paper, metal plates, and wall labels suggest the presence of phenomena that simply did not exist. Works like Negative Space Hole, 1967, Light Cloud Piece, 1967–68, and Static Electricity Piece, 1967–68, comprising only the words that make up their titles, were often described as “invisible sculptures.” In a 2003 LA Times review of the same exhibition, David Pagel states of the 1967 work, Electric Cord Piece, "It’s a sculpture because of what it does inside your head."

Butler's later works explored phenomena of the mind through her extensive large-scale drawings in which she often worked with raw pigment on paper. She is also well known for her three-volume book series titled "The Book of Lies" which included over 80 participating artists who created limited edition prints for the series. The project was started in 1991 with the final volume published in 2004. The series was celebrated with a traveling exhibition that was installed at 18th Street Arts Center in Santa Monica in 2007.

Butler was born in Washington, D.C., the daughter of art collector and gallerist Eugenia Butler, Sr. and attorney James G. Butler. She studied art at the University of California, Berkeley and after graduation she traveled with her infant daughter to South America, where she spent seven years traveling and studying shamanism.

Butler was a long time resident of Los Angeles. She died on March 29, 2008, from a brain hemorrhage in Santa Rosa, California.

Her daughter, Corazon del Sol, is also an artist, and has incorporated her mother's and grandmother's works in several exhibitions.
