= Mobiola =

Collection of softwares

- Developer: SHAPE Services
- Operating system: Microsoft Windows BlackBerry Windows Mobile Symbian
- Type: Web camera
- Website: www.mobiola.com

Mobiola is a software brand created by SHAPE Services.

== Products ==
- Mobiola Web Camera is a mobile software that transforms smartphones into a mobile Wireless webcam.
- Mobiola Video Studio converted videos for mobile devices.
- Mobiola xPlayer was a multimedia player for BlackBerry.
- Mobiola Headset enables the use of a mobile device as a wireless headset.
- Mobiola Snapshot enabled taking screenshots of the BlackBerry screen in most applications.

== See also ==
- Skype - Skype VoIP program
- MSN Messenger - MSN instant messenger
- Yahoo! Messenger - Yahoo! instant messenger
