= Allan McCollum =

American artist

- Collection of One Hundred Plaster Surrogates, 1982/90. Enamel on cast Hydrostone. Collection of the Museum van Hedendaagse Kunst Antwerpen, Belgium.
- Born: August 4, 1944 (age 82); Los Angeles, California, United States
- Known for: Sculpture, Conceptual art

Allan McCollum (born 4 August 1944) is a contemporary American artist who lives and works in New York City. In 1975, his work was included in the Whitney Biennial, and he moved to New York City the same year. In the late 1970s, he became especially well known for his series, Surrogate Paintings.

He has spent over fifty years exploring how objects achieve public and personal meaning in a world caught up in the contradictions made between unique handmade artworks and objects of mass production, and in the early 1990s, he began focusing most on collaborations with small regional communities and historical society museums in different parts of the world. His first solo exhibition was in 1970 and his first New York showing was in a group exhibition at the Sidney Janis Gallery in 1972.

== Early life ==
McCollum was born in The California Hospital in Los Angeles on August 4, 1944. In 1946, his family moved to Redondo Beach, California, where his three siblings were born, and where he lived until 1966. Both of his parents and many others in his family were active in the arts. His father, Warren McCollum, the son of an actress in New York and a child actor himself, performed a number of small parts on the Broadway stage and a few small roles in movies in the late 1930s and early 1940s, including the role of Jimmy Lane in the 1938 cult classic, Reefer Madness. He remained active in local theater groups throughout much of his life, while working as a security guard at a local research corporation. Allan McCollum's mother, Ann Hinton, the daughter of a piano teacher and a cartographer, also performed regularly as an actress and singer in local theater productions, and as a piano accompanist to a local voice teacher. His mother's brother, Sam Hinton, was a well-known folk singer and folk music historian in Southern California, and his mother's sister's husband was Jon Gnagy, the popular television art instructor who between 1946 and 1970 had the longest continuously running show on television.

== Education and early career ==
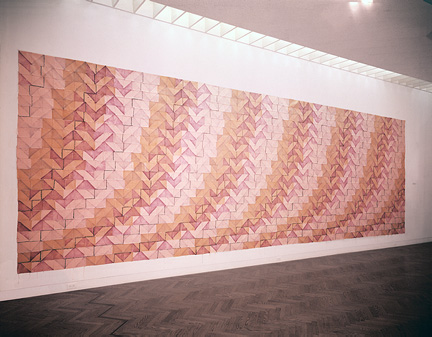
If Love Had Wings: A Perpetual Canon, 1972

In 1964, McCollum moved to Essex, England, pursuing the idea of being an actor, and joined a local theater group in Southend-on-Sea, but he changed his mind about a career in theater and returned to California in 1965, moved into a small mobile home park in Venice Beach, California, and attended Los Angeles Trade Technical College for five months, attempting to learn the trade of restaurant management and industrial kitchen work. For two years, he worked for Trans World Airlines at the Los Angeles International Airport, preparing meals for flights but, in 1967, he decided to educate himself as an artist. He learned quickly, influenced initially by reading the writings of the Fluxus artists and the early structuralists, and found a job as a truck driver and crate-builder for an art handling company in West Hollywood. Through this job he met many artists, art dealers, art collectors and museum curators, learning much about the contemporary art world. During the late 1960s, McCollum produced his early work while living in small rented storefront spaces, first in Venice Beach, and later in Santa Monica. In 1970, he established a studio in a converted parking garage in Venice Beach, where he lived and worked until 1975. During these years, he exhibited his work regularly at the Nicholas Wilder Gallery and also at the Claire Copley Gallery, both in Los Angeles. His work was shown in a number of museum group exhibitions, including shows at the Los Angeles County Museum of Art, the Pasadena Art Museum, the Long Beach Museum of Art, the Santa Barbara Museum of Art, the Oakland Museum, the San Francisco Art Institute, the Seattle Art Museum, the Detroit Institute of Arts, the Krannert Art Museum, and the Whitney Museum of American Art in New York. In late 1975, he moved to the SoHo district of New York City, where he initially worked as a guard at the Whitney Museum.

== Exhibition history ==
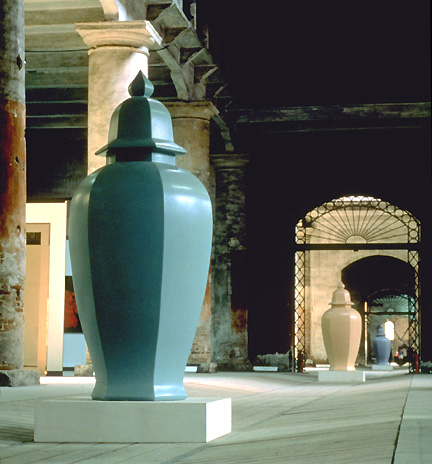
Perfect Vehicles, 1988. Installation: Venice Biennale Aperto, 1988

McCollum has had over 140 solo exhibitions, including retrospectives at the Musée d'Art Moderne in Lille, France (1998), the Sprengel Museum in Hannover, Germany (1995–96), the Serpentine Gallery in London (1990); the Rooseum Center for Contemporary Art in Malmo, Sweden (1990), IVAM Centre del Carme in Valencia, Spain (1990); Stedelijk Van Abbemuseum in Eindhoven, The Netherlands (1989) and Portikus in Frankfurt, Germany (1988).

He participated in the Aperto at the Venice Biennale in 1988 and 2012. In 2008, McCollum exhibited 1,800 drawings from his 1988-91 Drawings project at the 28th Bienal de São Paulo in São Paulo, Brazil. His works have been exhibited in the United States White House. He has produced numerous public art projects in the United States and Europe, and his works are held in over ninety art museum collections worldwide, including the Museum of Modern Art and the Metropolitan Museum of Art in New York, the Whitney Museum of American Art, the Solomon R. Guggenheim Museum, the Art Institute of Chicago, the Museum of Contemporary Art, Los Angeles and the National Gallery of Art in Washington D.C.

== Artwork ==
Over Ten Thousand Individual Works, (detail) 1987/91.

McCollum's family history, his experiences and training at working in industrial kitchens, and his interest in theater and Fluxus, including "task-oriented" performance art, offered him a unique take on labor and art, and the methods and systems of quantity-production showed themselves in his artwork from the beginning. He is known for utilizing the methods of mass production in his work in many different ways, often creating thousands of objects that, while produced in large quantity, are each unique. In 1988-91, he created over 30,000 completely unique objects he titled Individual Works, which were gathered and exhibited in collections of over 10,000. The objects were made by taking many dozens of rubber molds from common household objects—like bottle caps, food containers, and kitchen tools—and combining plaster casts of these parts in thousands of possible ways, never repeating a combination. In 1989, he used a similar system to create thousands of handmade graphite pencil drawings, using hundreds of plastic drafting templates he designed for this purpose, each drawing made unique by combining the templates according to a combinatorial protocol that never repeated itself.

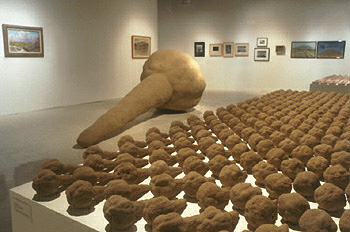
Mount Signal and Its Sand Spikes, 1999/2000

Beginning in the early 1990s, McCollum expanded his interests in quantity production to include explorations into the ways regional communities give meaning to local landmarks and geological oddities in establishing community identity, and collaborated with a number of small towns and small historical museums in Europe and the United States, bringing attention to the way local narratives develop around objects peculiar to geographic regions, and drawing comparisons to the way artworks develop meaning in a parallel manner. Often these projects involved reproducing local objects in quantity, or creating models or copies of local artifacts and symbols. In 1995, he collaborated with the College of Eastern Utah Prehistoric Museum in Price, Utah, to make replicas of its entire collection of dinosaur track casts, and exhibited these in New York and Europe. In 1997, he collaborated with the International Center for Lightning Research and Testing in Starke, Florida, to trigger lightning with rockets and worked with a local souvenir manufacturer to create over 10,000 replicas of a fulgurite created by the lightning strike. In 2000, he collaborated with the Pioneers Museum in the desert community of Imperial Valley, California, to reproduce souvenir copies and large models of its local mountain, Mount Signal, and the unique "Sand Spike" sand concretions found at its base. In 2003, he created 120 topographical models of the states of Missouri and Kansas, which he donated and delivered himself to 120 small historical society museums in both states.

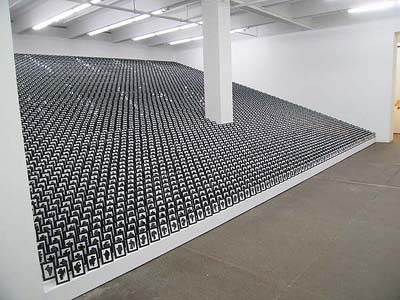
Monoprints from The Shapes Project, 2005/05.

In 2005, McCollum designed The Shapes Project, a combinatorial system to produce "a completely unique shape for every person on the planet, without repeating." The system involves organizing a basic vocabulary of 300 "parts" which can be combined in over 30 billion different ways, created as "vector files" in a computer drawing program. McCollum has used the system in collaborations with a community library, schoolchildren, home craftworkers, writers, architects and other artists, as the Shapes are created to be used for many different kinds of projects, and so far have been produced in the form of both prints and sculpture, in Plexiglas, Corian, plywood, hardwoods, metals, rubber and fabric, in a variety of sizes. In 2010, he published The Book of Shapes, in collaboration with mfc-michèle didier. This book makes the Shapes Project complete. The first volume contains the 300 shapes "parts" and the second includes the guides and instructions for creating all possible combinations with these components. The same year, he organized the Shapes for Hamilton project, in which a unique signed and dated Shapes print was made for each of the 6,000+ residents of the township of Hamilton, New York.

He has been a recipient of an NEA Special Project Grant and an Individual Support Grant from the Adolph and Esther Gottlieb Foundation.

== Collaborations and writings ==
McCollum has occasionally collaborated with other artists in producing projects, including Louise Lawler (1983, 1984, 1988, 1996), Andrea Fraser (1991), Laurie Simmons (1984), Matt Mullican (2004), Andrea Zittel (2007), Allen Ruppersberg (2008), Pablo Helguera (2014), Astrid Preston and Cynthia Daignault (2016). He has also written texts and interviewed fellow artists for books and catalogs, including Matt Mullican (1979 and 2006) Allen Ruppersberg (1999), Andrea Zittel (2001), Roxy Paine (2002), and Harrell Fletcher (2005).

== Bibliography ==
- Nicolas Bourriaud, "McCollum's Aura", New Art International, October 1988.
- Lynne Cooke, Selma Klein-Essink and Anne Rorimer, Allan McCollum, Stedelijk Van Abbemuseum, Eindhoven, the Netherlands, 1989; in Dutch and English.
- Hal Foster, "Subversive Signs", Recoding: Art, Spectacle, Cultural Politics, Seattle Bay Press, 1986.
- Andrea Fraser, König, Kasper and Wilmes, Ulrich: Allan McCollum, Portikus, Frankfurt, Germany. Published by Walther König, Cologne, West Germany, 1988; in German and English.
- Rosalind Krauss and Yve-alain Bois, Formless: A User's Guide, Zone Books, New York 1997.
- Craig Owens, "Allan McCollum: Repetition & Difference", Art in America, September 1983.
