= Eiji Sumi =

Japanese artist (born 1970)

- Born: 1970 (age 55–56); Tokyo, Japan
- Education: Rikkyo University
- Known for: Installation art, Multi-media art, Sculpture, Graphic Design
- Website: http://www.eijisumi.com/

Eiji Sumi (隅 英二; born 1970) is a Japanese artist based in Bangkok, Thailand since 2012. Born in Tokyo, he lived New York from 1993 to 2012. He is most widely known for his installation art projects, such as Densen/Plus "a mixed-media exhibition that aimed to raise awareness of the need to put power cables underground, and QUARK, a science art project inspired by the way highly reflective powder material looks when caught in light that visualize aero dynamics and fluid dynamics and was described as "mesmerizing" and "enchanting" by the Bangkok Post. His polycarbonate origami sculpture, Sinusold, was a finalist in The Sovereign Asian Art Prize for 2016.

He has held numerous exhibitions internationally, and has been curated by Eric Shiner, Vice President at Sotheby's New York and previously director of the Andy Warhol Museum, and Helen Wu, the producer and co-curator of Paper Rain Parade seen in Art Basel Hong Kong.

In addition to his art works he also is a full-time lecturer in the Communication Design program at Chulalongkorn University.

== Background ==
Eiji was born in Tokyo. After moving to New York City in 1993 he transformed his career in fine art to include design, multimedia and installation. While there he gained attention for a variety of project and worked as an artist assistant to Italian master painter Stefano Castronovo.

== Inspiration and style ==
His varied works have been described to "often feature elaborate structures and new spatial experiences, using light as his principal medium." He has named Joseph Beuys, James Turrell and Eva Hesse among the artists that inspire him.

== Body of work ==
=== Land[e]scape Exhibition ===
In 2007, he participated in the Land[e]scape Exhibition at the Onishi Gallery in New York City curated by Eric C. Shiner (then director of the Andy Warhol Gallery). The work he exhibited consisted of "incredibly complex scenes of actual places he has visited in cities around the world, including New York and Amsterdam, in one long connected line, an effect that gives the images a tension-ridden feeling of instability in excess".

=== Cocoon ===
In 2013, Eiji Sumi participated in the Art on Farm series by the Jim Thompson Farm. His work Cocoon was a giant Cocoon, using recycle material of silk floss, and textile and bamboo. The public could enter Cocoon and it was intended to "express the feelings and sensations that human beings would have, if they were smaller than silkworms..." hoping to help "...people to appreciate the things that we have in our life that we do not usually think of or imagine where they come from".

=== QUARK ===
His installation QUARK, was a site specific work displayed at H Project Space at H Gallery Bangkok and was named after the subatomic particle with the same name.

=== Under construction ===
In 2013, Eiji held an exhibition called Under Construction at WTF Gallery. It was a mixed-media exhibition inspired by his fascination with construction sites. His aim in the exhibition was described as attempting to "evoke a sensation that sways between gritty dystopia and avant-garde development", and was described as transporting "viewers into a scene hovering between progressive expansion and dystopian decay".
