= Eva Hesse =

German-born American sculptor and textile artist (1936-1970)

- Hesse in her studio in 1965
- Born: January 11, 1936; Hamburg, Germany
- Died: May 29, 1970 (aged 34); New York City, U.S.
- Education: Yale University, Cooper Union, Pratt Institute, Art Students League of New York
- Known for: Sculpture
- Movement: Postminimalism
- Spouse: Tom Doyle (1961–66; divorced)

Eva Hesse (January 11, 1936 – May 29, 1970) was a German-born American sculptor known for her pioneering work in materials such as latex, fiberglass, and plastics. She is one of the artists who ushered in the postminimal art movement in the 1960s.

== Life ==
Hesse was born into a family of observant Jews in Hamburg, Germany, on January 11, 1936. She was the second born child of Wilhelm Hesse, an attorney, and Ruth Marcus Hesse. When Hesse was two years old in December 1938, her parents, hoping to flee from Nazi Germany, sent Hesse and her older sister, Helen Hesse Charash, to the Netherlands. They were aboard one of the last Kindertransport trains.

After almost six months of separation, the reunited family moved to England and then, in 1939, emigrated to New York City where they settled into Manhattan's Washington Heights. In 1944, Hesse's parents separated; her father remarried in 1945 and her mother killed herself in 1946. In 1961, Hesse met and married sculptor Tom Doyle (1928–2016); they divorced in 1966.

In October 1969, she was diagnosed with a brain tumor, and she died on Friday, May 29, 1970, after three failed operations within a year. Her death at the age of 34 ended a career that would become highly influential, despite spanning only a decade.

== Career ==
Hesse graduated from New York's School of Industrial Art at the age of 16, and in 1952 she enrolled in the Pratt Institute of Design. She dropped out only a year later. When Hesse was 18, she interned at Seventeen magazine. During this time she also took classes at the Art Students League. From 1954 to 1957 she studied at Cooper Union and in 1959 she received her BA from Yale University. While at Yale, Hesse studied under Josef Albers and was heavily influenced by Abstract Expressionism.

After Yale, Hesse returned to New York, where she became friends with many other young minimalist artists, including Sol LeWitt, Donald Judd, Yayoi Kusama, and others. Her close friendship with Sol LeWitt continued until the end of her life. The two frequently wrote to one another, and in 1965 LeWitt famously counseled a young doubting Eva to "Stop [thinking] and just DO!" Both Hesse and LeWitt went on to become influential artists; their friendship stimulated the artistic development of their work.

In November 1961, Eva Hesse married fellow sculptor Tom Doyle. In August 1962, Eva Hesse and Tom Doyle participated in an Allan Kaprow Happening at the Art Students League of New York in Woodstock, New York. There Hesse made her first three-dimensional piece: a costume for the Happening. In 1963, Eva Hesse had a one-person show of works on paper at the Allan Stone Gallery on New York's Upper East Side. By 1965 the two had moved to Germany so that Doyle could pursue an artist's residency from German industrialist and collector Friedrich Arnhard Scheidt, a move Hesse was not happy about. Hesse and Doyle, whose marriage was by then falling apart, lived and worked in an abandoned textile mill in Kettwig-on-the-Ruhr near Essen for about a year.. The building still contained machine parts, tools, and materials from its previous use and the angular forms of these disused machines and tools served as inspiration for Hesse's mechanical drawings and paintings. Her first sculpture was a relief titled Ringaround Arosie, which featured cloth-covered cord, electrical wire, and masonite. This year in Germany marked a turning point in Hesse's career. From here on she would continue to make sculptures, which became the primary focus of her work. Returning to New York City in 1965, she began working and experimenting with the unconventional materials that would become characteristic of her output: latex, fiberglass, and plastic.

== Methods, materials, and processes ==
Repetition 19, III (1968), fiberglass and polyester resin, at the Museum of Modern Art

Hesse's early work (1960–65) consisted primarily of abstract drawings and paintings. She is better known for her sculptures and because of this, her drawings are often regarded as preliminary steps to her later work. However, she created most of her drawings as a separate body of work. She stated, "they were related because they were mine but they weren't related in one completing the other."

One More Than One (1967) at the National Gallery of Art in 2022

Hesse's interest in latex as a medium for sculptural forms had to do with immediacy. Art critic John Keats stated: "immediacy may be one of the prime reasons Hesse was attracted to latex". Hesse's first two works using latex, Schema and Sequel (1967–68), use latex in a way never imagined by the manufacturer. In her artwork Untitled (Rope Piece), Hesse employed industrial latex and once it was hardened, she hung it on the wall and ceiling using wire."Industrial latex was meant for casting. Hesse handled it like house paint, brushing layer upon layer to build up a surface that was smooth yet irregular, ragged at the edges like deckled paper."

Hesse's work often employs multiple forms of similar shapes organized together in grid structures or clusters. Retaining some of the defining forms of minimalism, modularity, and the use of unconventional materials, she created eccentric work that was repetitive and labor-intensive. Her work Contingent from 1968 is an ideal example of this concept. And in a statement on her work, Hesse described her piece entitled Hang-Up as "...the first time my idea of absurdity or extreme feeling came through...The whole thing is absolutely rigid, neat cord around the entire thing... It is extreme and that is why I like it and don't like it... It is the most ridiculous structure that I ever made and that is why it is really good".

== Postminimalism and feminism ==
Test Piece for "Contingent" (1969) at the National Gallery of Art in 2022

Eva Hesse is associated with the Postminimal art movement. Arthur Danto distinguished post-minimalism from minimalism by its "mirth and jokiness," its "unmistakable whiff of eroticism," and its "nonmechanical repetition."

Hesse worked and sometimes competed with her male counterparts in post-minimalist art, a primarily male-dominated movement. Many feminist art historians have noted how her work successfully illuminates women's issues while refraining from any obvious political agenda. She revealed, in a letter to Ethelyn Honig (1965), that a woman is "at disadvantage from the beginning… She lacks conviction that she has the 'right' to achievement. She also lacks the belief that her achievements are worthy". She continued to explain that, "a fantastic strength is necessary and courage. I dwell on this all the time. My determination and will are strong but I am lacking so in self-esteem that I never seem to overcome." Hesse denied her work was strictly feminist, defending it as feminine but without feminist statements in mind. In an interview with Cindy Nemser for Woman's Art Journal (1970), she stated, "The way to beat discrimination in art is by art. Excellence has no sex."

== Visual and critical analysis ==
Hesse's work often shows minimal physical manipulation of a material while simultaneously completely transforming the meaning it conveys. This simplicity and complexity has evoked controversy among art historians. Debate has focussed on which pieces should be considered complete and finished works, and which are studies, sketches, or models for future works. Hesse's drawings have often been noted as drafts for later sculptures, but Hesse herself disavowed any strong connection. Her work is often described as anti-form, i.e. a resistance to uniformity. Her work embodies elements of minimalism in its simple shapes, delicate lines, and limited color palette. Barry Schwabsky described her work for the Camden Arts Centre in London: "Things folded, things piled, things twisted, things wound and unwound; tangled things, blunt things to connect to; materials that have a congealed look, materials that seem lost or discarded or mistreated; shapes that look like they should have been made of flesh and shapes, that look like they might be made of flesh but should not have been – you can look at these things, these materials, these shapes, and feel the shudder of an unnamable nanosensation, or you can let your eye pass by them without reaction; maybe you can do both at once." All of her work, and especially her drawings, are based on repetition and simple progressions.

== Preservation of artworks ==
There has been ongoing discussion about how best to preserve Eva Hesse's sculptures. With the exception of fiberglass, most of her favored materials have aged badly, so much of her work presents conservators with an enormous challenge. Arthur Danto, writing of the Jewish Museum's 2006 retrospective, refers to "the discolorations, the slackness in the membrane-like latex, the palpable aging of the material… Yet, somehow the work does not feel tragic. Instead, it is full of life, of eros, even of comedy… Each piece in the show vibrates with originality and mischief."

In some cases, her work is damaged beyond presentation. For instance, Sans III can no longer be exhibited to the public because the latex boxes have curled in on themselves and crumbled. Hesse's close friend Sol LeWitt argued for steps for active conservation, "She wanted her work to last ... She certainly didn't have the attitude that she would mutely sit by and let it disintegrate before her eyes." LeWitt's response is supported by many of Hesse's other friends and colleagues. However, Hesse's dedication to material and process contradicts her intention for these works to attain permanency. When discussing this topic with collectors in mind, she wrote, "At this point, I feel a little guilty when people want to buy it. I think they know but I want to write them a letter and say it's not going to last. I am not sure what my stand on lasting really is. Part of me feels that it's superfluous and if I need to use rubber that is more important. Life doesn't last; art doesn't last."

== Legacy ==
Her art is often viewed in the context of the many struggles of her life. This includes escaping from the Nazis, her parents' divorce, the suicide of her mother when she was 10, her failed marriage, and the death of her father. A 2016 documentary entitled Eva Hesse, premiered in New York, illustrated her painful background. Directed by Marcie Begleiter, the film tells the story of Hesse's "tragically foreshortened life". It "focuses on those years of artistic emergence, a period of rapid development and furious productivity, with few parallels in the history of art."

While experiences no doubt had profound impressions on Hesse, the true impact of her artwork has been her formal, artistic invention: for example, her inventive uses of material, her contemporary response to the minimalist movement, and her ability to usher in the postmodern and postminimalist art movements. Arthur Danto connects the two by describing her as "cop[ing] with emotional chaos by reinventing sculpture through aesthetic insubordination, playing with worthless material amid the industrial ruins of a defeated nation that, only two decades earlier, would have murdered her without a second thought."

Hesse was among the first artists of the 1960s to experiment with the fluid contours of the organic world of nature, as well as the simplest of artistic gestures. Some observers see in these qualities latent, proto-feminist references to the female body; others find in Hesse's languid forms expressions of wit, whimsy, and a sense of spontaneous invention with casually found, or "everyday" materials. Prominent artists that have noted her as a primary influence include Japanese artist Eiji Sumi

== Exhibitions ==
In 1961, Hesse's gouache paintings were exhibited in Brooklyn Museum's 21st International Watercolor Biennial. Simultaneously, she showed her drawings in the John Heller Gallery exhibition Drawings: Three Young Americans. In August 1962, she and Tom Doyle participated in an Allan Kaprow Happening at the Art Students League of New York in Woodstock, New York. In 1963, Hesse had a one-person show of works on paper at the Allan Stone Gallery on New York's Upper East Side. Her first solo show of sculpture was presented at the Kunstverein für die Rheinlande und Westfalen, Düsseldorf, in 1965. In November 1968, she exhibited her large-scale sculptures at the Fischbach Gallery in New York. The exhibition was titled Chain Polymers and was her only solo sculpture exhibition during her lifetime in the United States. The exhibition was pivotal in Hesse's career, securing her reputation at the time. Her large piece Expanded Expansion showed at the Whitney Museum in the 1969 exhibit "Anti-Illusion: Process/Materials".

There have been dozens of major posthumous exhibitions in the United States and Europe. An early one was at the Guggenheim Museum (1972), while in 1979, three separate iterations of an Eva Hesse retrospective were held, entitled Eva Hesse: Sculpture. These exhibitions took place at the Whitechapel Art Gallery in London from May 4 – June 17, 1979; the Kröller-Müller in Otterlo from June 30 – August 5, 1979; and the Kestner-Gesellschaft in Hannover from August 17 – September 23, 1979. One artwork featured in the exhibition was Aught, four double sheets of latex stuffed with polyethylene. In 1982, Ellen H. Johnson organized the first retrospective dedicated entirely to Hesse's drawings, which traveled to the Grey Art Gallery at NYU, the Allen Memorial Art Museum at Oberlin College, the Renaissance Society at the University of Chicago, the Contemporary Arts Museum in Houston, and the Baltimore Museum of Art. In 1992 and 1993, retrospective exhibitions were held in New Haven, Valencia and Paris.

Numerous major exhibitions have been organized since the early 2000s, including a major show in 2002 (organized jointly between the San Francisco Museum of Modern Art, Tate Modern and Museum Wiesbaden), and concurrent exhibitions in 2006 at The Drawing Center in New York and the Jewish Museum of New York. In Europe, Hesse had recent exhibitions at the Fundació Antoni Tàpies in Barcelona (2010) and at the Fruitmarket Gallery, Edinburgh (August to October 2009). An exhibition of her drawings from the collection of the Allen Memorial Art Museum will travel in 2019-20 to the Museum Wiesbaden, Mumok in Vienna, Hauser & Wirth New York, and the Allen Memorial Art Museum.

== Collections ==
Over 20 of her works feature in the Museum of Modern Art, in New York. The largest collection of Hesse's work outside of the United States is in Museum Wiesbaden, which started actively acquiring her work after the 1990 exhibition "Female Artists of the Twentieth Century." One of the largest collections of Hesse's drawings is in the Allen Memorial Art Museum at Oberlin College, which also maintains the Eva Hesse Archive, donated to the museum by the artist's sister, Helen Hesse Charash, in 1977. Other public collections include the National Gallery of Art (US), Art Institute of Chicago, the Hirshhorn Museum and Sculpture Garden, the National Gallery of Australia, the Nelson-Atkins Museum of Art, San Francisco Museum of Modern Art, the Solomon R. Guggenheim Museum, the Tate Gallery, the Jewish Museum and the Whitney Museum of American Art.

== List of selected works ==
- Untitled. 1963–64. Oil on canvas. 59 × 39 1/4 in. The Jewish Museum (Manhattan).
- Ringaround Arosie. 1965. Pencil, acetone, varnish, enamel paint, ink, and cloth covered electrical wire on papier-mâché and masonite. 26 3/8 x 16 1/2 x 4 1/2 in. Museum of Modern Art, New York.
- Laocoön. 1965-66. Acrylic, cloth-covered cord, wire, papier-mâché over plastic plumbers' pipe. 130 x 23 1/4 x 23 1/4 in. Allen Memorial Art Museum, Oberlin.
- Untitled or Not Yet. Nets. 1966. Polyethylene, paper, lead weights, and cord. 71 x 15 1/2 x 8 1/4 in. San Francisco Museum of Modern Art, San Francisco.
- Hang Up. 1966. Acrylic on cloth over wood; acrylic on cord over steel tube. 72 × 84 × 78 in. Art Institute of Chicago, Chicago.
- Addendum. 1967. Painted papier-mâché, wood and cord. Dimensions variable. Tate Collection.
- Repetition Nineteen III. 1968. Fiberglass and polyester resin. 19 units, dimensions variable. Museum of Modern Art, New York.
- Sans II. 1968. Fiberglass and polyester resin. 38 in. x 86 in. x 6 1/8 in. Five parts divided among: San Francisco Museum of Modern Art, San Francisco; Glenstone Museum; Whitney Museum of American Art; Museum Wiesbaden; and Daros Collection, Switzerland.
- Contingent. 1969. Cheesecloth, latex, fiberglass. 8 units, dimensions variable. National Gallery of Australia, Canberra.
- Accession II. 1969. Galvanized steel and vinyl. 30 3/4 × 30 3/4 × 30 3/4 in. Detroit Institute of Arts, Detroit.
- Right After. 1969. Fiberglass. 5 × 18 × 4 ft. Milwaukee Art Museum, Milwaukee.
- Expanded Expansion. 1969. Fiberglass, polyester resin, latex, and cheesecloth. 122 inches x 300 in. Guggenheim Museum, New York.
- No Title. 1969–70. Latex, rope, string, and wire. Dimensions variable. Whitney Museum of American Art.

== Bibliography ==
- Art Talk: Conversations with Barbara Hepworth, Sonia Delaunay, Louise Nevelson, Lee Krasner, Alice Neel, Grace Hartigan, Marisol, Eva Hesse, Lila Katzen, Eleanor Antin, Audrey Flack, Nancy Grossman. 1975 New York; Charles Scribner's Sons. 201-224pps. Reprinted Art Talk: Conversations: Conversations with 15 Women Artists. 1995 IconEditions, An Imprint of HarperCollins Publishers. 173-199pps.
- Corby, Vanessa. Eva Hesse: Longing, Belonging, and Displacement (I.B. Tauris, 2010) 250 pages; focus on drawings from 1960–61.
- Eva Hesse. 1976 New York; New York University Press / 1992 Da Capo Press, Inc. Lucy R. Lippard. illus. Trade Paper. 251p.
- Eva Hesse Sculpture. 1992 Timken Publishers, Inc. Bill Barrette. illus. Trade Paper. 274p.
- Eva Hesse Paintings, 1960–1964. 1992 Robert Miller Gallery. Max Kozloff. Edited by John Cheim and Nathan Kernan. illus. Trade Cloth. 58p.
- Eva Hesse: A Retrospective. 1992. Edited by Helen A. Cooper. New Haven: Yale University Press.
- Four Artists: Robert Ryman, Eva Hesse, Bruce Nauman, Susan Rothenberg. Michael Blackwood Productions, Inc. Color VHS 45 min.
- Busch, Julia M., A decade of sculpture: the 1960s (The Art Alliance Press: Philadelphia; Associated University Presses: London, 1974) ISBN 0-87982-007-1
- Eva Hesse Archives, Oberlin College, Oberlin Ohio.
- "It's All Yours" Seventeen (September, 1954): 140-141, 161.
- Willson, William S., ""Eva Hesse: On the Threshold of Illusions", in :Inside the Visible edited by Catherine de Zegher, MIT Press, 1996.
- de Zegher, Catherine (ed.), Eva Hesse Drawing. NY/New Haven: The Drawing Center/Yale University Press, 2005. (Including essays by Benjamin H.D. Buchloh, Briony Fer, Mignon Nixon, Bracha Ettinger). ISBN 0-300-11618-7
- Griselda Pollock with Vanessa Corby (eds.), Encountering Eva Hesse. London and Munich: Prestel, 2006.
- Eva Hesse (2006): Volumes I and II: Paintings and Sculptures. Vol. I (Paintings) with an essay by Annette Spohn. Vol. II (Sculptures) with an essay by Jörg Daur. ISBN 0-300-10441-3
- Milne, Drew (2008). "Eva Hesse". In Marcus Reichert (ed.). Art without Art: Selected Writing from the World of Blunt Edge. London: Ziggurat Books. pp. 55–60. ISBN 978-0-9546656-6-1.
- Veronica Roberts (Editor), Lucy R. Lippard (Contributor), Kirsten Swenson, "Converging Lines: Eva Hesse and Sol LeWitt". Yale University Press, 2014. ISBN 978-0-300-20482-7
- Briony Fer, Eva Hesse: Studiowork.
