= Rene Daalder =

Dutch writer and director (1944–2019)

Rene Daalder (born René Daalder 3 March 1944 in Texel, North Holland; died 31 December 2019, sometimes credited as Renee Daalder) was a Dutch writer and director. He lived in Los Angeles. Originally a protégé of Russ Meyer, Daalder has worked with Jan de Bont, Frans Bromet, and Rem Koolhaas.

He is regarded as a pioneer of virtual reality and digital motion picture technologies.

== Movies ==
His movies include the teenage horror classic Massacre at Central High (1976); the punk-rock musical Population: 1 (1986); Habitat (1997); and Hysteria (1997). He also directed the music video for Supertramp's "Brother Where You Bound". In October 2008, Population: 1, which features Tomata du Plenty of The Screamers, was released on DVD. He also wrote and directed a documentary on Bas Jan Ader entitled Here is Always Somewhere Else, which was released on DVD in November 2008.

== Other projects ==
At the end of 2007, Rene Daalder launched SpaceCollective in collaboration with Folkert Gorter. The community-driven website, where information and ideas are being exchanged about the current state of our species, our planet and the universe, has over 2500 contributors. A growing number of universities, architecture and design schools are conducting projects on the website.

In 2008 Rene proposed a new genre of art called “Gravity Art” based on the idea of gravity as a medium. Bas Jan Ader is seen as the founder of this genre, for the themes of his work of falling and letting go.

In 1989, a movie based on the Beatles song, Strawberry Fields Forever was in production and was to serve as a pseudo-sequel to The Beatles first animated movie Yellow Submarine. After being canceled in 1992, in 2009, a revival was attempted, Daalder approached to be the producer but was canceled. One of the concept artists who worked on Strawberry Fields was Polish surrealist artist Jacek Yerka, in which two of his paintings "Creation Of Life" and "Technobeach" was concept art for the movie before the movie was permanently shelved.
