= SHAPE Services =

SHAPE GmbH
- Type: Private
- Industry: Mobile software
- Headquarters: Stuttgart, Germany
- Area served: Worldwide
- Products: IM+, IM+ Video, IM+ Talk, Business Card Reader, iDisplay, WebCamera, Barcode Reader, VR+, xPlayer, RDM+, GPSed
- Website: shape.ag

SHAPE.AG (formerly SHAPE Services) is a cross-platform independent software vendor and web-based services provider. The company develops instant messaging, social networking, productivity, entertainment, games, media and location-based applications for Apple iPhone, iPod Touch and iPad, BlackBerry, Windows Phone/Windows Mobile, Android, Symbian S60, UIQ, J2ME, and HP/Palm webOS mobile platforms.

== About the company ==
SHAPE.AG (with AG standing for Apps&Games is a worldwide operating company headquartered in Stuttgart, Germany and offices in Germany and Ukraine. The company was founded in 2002 and as of 2011 had more than 60 employees.
In May 2008 SHAPE acquired Warelex LLC, the US developer of multimedia applications and technologies for mobile devices.
In July 2011 SHAPE has agreed to acquire Crisp App, the Hong Kong–based developer of the fone app for iOS.
In 2011 the company added location-based instant messaging service Neighbors into IM+ application.
In 2012 SHAPE raised $10 million from Russian investment firm Finam.
In March 2012 SHAPE officially changed its name from SHAPE Services to SHAPE.AG (AG stands for Apps&Games).

== Current products ==
The company's best-known software products include:

- IM+ – multiprotocol multiplatform mobile instant messenger.
- IM+ Web – multiprotocol web instant messenger.
- Business Card Reader – OCR utility for business cards processing and saving of contacts in address book.
- iDisplay – utility allowing to use devices running on Android OS and iOS as a secondary display for Windows and Mac computers.
- RDM+ – multiplatform remote access application for mobile devices.
- CheckIn+/CheckIn Pro – an augmented reality app that overlays user's current surroundings with places from select geolocation applications, allowing users to see each notable destination relative to its position in the real world.
- Chat for GTalk – monoclient instant messenger for Google Talk/Google+.

== See also ==
- Mobiola
- Skype – Skype VoIP program
- MSN Messenger – MSN instant messenger
- Yahoo! Messenger – Yahoo! instant messenger
