= Karen Shapiro =

American film producer

Karen S. Shapiro
- Occupation: Producer
- Years active: 1979–present
- Spouse: Syud Sharif
- Children: Ben Sharif, David Sharif

Karen S. Shapiro is an American film, television, theater and record producer. She also serves as Vice President of Partners for Progressive Israel, and serves on the advisory board for the Feminist Institute.

The documentary, Eva Hesse, premiered on the US television series, American Masters.

== Filmography ==
Title	Year	Role	Type
Eva Hesse	2016	Producer	Film
Beat the Drum	2003	Producer	Film
The Neighbor	2008	Producer	Film
The Low Life	1996	Producer	Film
The Hero	1979	Producer	Film
Violet	1981	Producer	Film
Other Mothers	1993	Producer	Television
Between Mother and Daughter	1996	Producer	Television
ABC Afterschool Special Episode: "Private Affairs"	1989	Producer	Television
Dying to the Perfect: the Ellen Hart Pena Story	1996	Producer	Television
ABC Afterschool Special Episode: "Over the Limit"	1990	Producer	Television
Chance of a Lifetime	1998	Producer	Television
To Face Her Past	1996	Producer	Television
Postcards from Heaven	1999	Producer	Television
Unsolved Mysteries episodes	2001–2002	Senior Producer	Television
Arrest and Trial	2000	Senior Producer	Television
Liberation '95	1995	Producer	Concert
Awake and Sing	1995	Producer	Film
Together as One	1995	Producer	Film
