= Eugenia Butler =

American art collector and collector

- Born: Eugenia Louise Jefferson; 1922; Bakersfield, California
- Died: December 21, 2001 (aged 79); Calabasas, California
- Occupation: Gallerist
- Spouse: James G. Butler
- Children: 8, including Eugenia P. Butler

Eugenia Louise Butler (née Jefferson; 1922 – December 21, 2001) was an American art dealer and collector. In 1963, she became the American representative of Galleria Del Deposito, which featured work by European artists who made functional art objects, such as trays or jewels. She co-directed the Los Angeles Gallery 669 with founder Riko Mizuno from 1967. Butler ran the Eugenia Butler Gallery on La Cienega from 1968 to 1971. Her gallery showed the work of conceptual artists, including John Baldessari, James Lee Byars, Douglas Huebler, and her daughter, Eugenia P. Butler.

== Life and family ==
Born Eugenia Louise Jefferson in Bakersfield, California in 1922, Butler grew up in Los Angeles. She attended Scripps College and served as a master sergeant in the Marines during World War II where she met her future husband James G. Butler, a lawyer and fighter pilot. After World War II, the pair moved to South Rimpau street and had eight children. Their daughter, Eugenia P. Butler, went on to become a contemporary artist. The younger Butler's work was shown in Butler's gallery. After the closing of her gallery in 1971, Butler was diagnosed with breast cancer and received a mastectomy. It was around this time that she began an affair with fellow artist Paul Cotton and left her family to move with him to San Francisco. At Documenta, an art exhibition in Kassel, Germany in 1972, Butler arrived nude riding a white horse. It was there she attempted to impersonate her daughter Eugenia P. Butler and pass off her work as her own. Plagued by mental illness and personal turmoil, Butler never opened another gallery.

== Career ==
Butler served on LACMA's Contemporary Art Council and New Talent Award Committee in the mid 1960s. An avid collector, Butler traveled to galleries across Europe. It was at this time that Butler was introduced to Galleria del Deposito, a Genoa based art collective of which Lucio Fontana, Victor Vasarely, and Eugenio Carmi were a part. In 1966 Butler became the Los Angeles representative for Galleria del Deposito. In 1967, Butler partnered with Riko Mizuno, the gallerist running Gallery 669, for a single year. The two presented groundbreaking exhibitions such as Joseph Kosuth's first solo show in the United States, "Nothing" and the work of Richard Jackson.

== The Eugenia Butler Gallery ==
Butler opened her namesake gallery in 1968 after parting ways with Riko Mizuno. Butler's main focus for her gallery was on conceptual art consisting of dematerialized and non-object oriented work. She was an early champion of conceptual art, developing the hallmarks of space, interaction and performance. The gallery opened with Allen Rupperberg's first solo show where he presented "Location Piece". Later that same year James Lee Bryars, a conceptual and performance artist, built a block wall separating Butler's office from the gallery. Butler also presented conceptual artist John Baldessari's second gallery exhibition in 1970. Butler was the first person to sell one of Baldessari's photographs. The most controversial piece to come out of the Eugenia Butler Gallery was Swiss artist Dieter Roth's exhibition, "Staple Cheese (A Race)" (1970). Roth filled 37 suitcases with cheese and left them in the gallery during summer. The health department's attempts to shut the exhibition down were thwarted by Butler's husband on the grounds of artistic merit.
