= Abigail Solomon-Godeau =

American art critic and historian

Abigail Solomon-Godeau (born January 6, 1948, in New York City) is an American art critic, exhibition curator, art historian, and Professor Emerita in art history, University of California, Santa Barbara.

== Education ==
B.A., University of Massachusetts, magna cum laude

Ph.D., Graduate Center, City University of New York

== Career ==
Abigail Solomon-Godeau is an art critic and art historian who taught at the University of California, Santa Barbara, and is now a Professor Emeritus there in the Department of History of Art & Architecture.

In 1996, she was a Fellow at the Swedish Collegium for Advanced Study in Uppsala, Sweden.

Solomon-Godeau is a 2001 Guggenheim Fellow.

== Exhibition curator ==
Among the exhibitions Solomon-Godeau has curated are;

- The Way We Live Now, 1982
- Sexual Difference: Both Sides of the Camera, 1992
- Mistaken Identities (with Constance Lewallen), 1994
- The Image of Desire; Femininity, Modernity, and the Birth of Mass Culture in Nineteenth-Century France (with Beatrice Farwell), 1998.

== Publications ==
Solomon-Godeau has produced over 100 works in 236 publications in 4 languages. Her writing focuses on feminist theory, photography, 19th-century French art and contemporary art, and she offers a reassessment or revision of the ideas presented by the artistic "canon" and of some of her predecessors in the history of art, such as Martha Rosler and Susan Sontag. In a 2004 essay she describes herself as among those who "intellectually came of age as postmodernists, poststructuralists, feminists, Marxists, antihumanists, or, for that matter, atheists." and later clarifies;

I do not consider my work to be particularly theoretical, although my writings on photography, like those on art history or contemporary art, are informed by the theorists, past and present, who have shaped my thinking overall. Perhaps my essays are best characterized as a form of practical criticism insofar as they engage with specific bodies of work, historical contexts, social relations, and institutional structures, rather than with the more philosophical questions manifested in the new field of the philosophy of photography.

Her essays have appeared in journals including Art in America, Artforum, The Art Journal, Afterimage, Camera Obscura, October, Screen, and many have been collected in anthologies in various languages.

She is currently working on a book Genre, Gender and the Nude in French Art.

=== Books ===
- Photography at the Dock. Essays on Photographic History, Institution, and Practices, University of Minnesota Press, Minneapolis 1991. ISBN 978-0-8166-1913-9.
- Male Trouble. A Crisis in Representation, Thames & Hudson, London 1999. ISBN 978-0-5002-8037-9.
- (with Gabriele Schor as Ed.): Birgit Jürgenssen. Hatje Cantz, Ostfildern 2009, ISBN 978-3-7757-2460-9 .
- Cannon fodder. Photography, speech, feminism, the textual, Paris 2016, ISBN 978-2-84597-548-4 .
- Photography after Photography. Gender, Genre, History, Duke University Press, Durham, London 2017. ISBN 978-0-8223-6266-1.

=== Articles ===
- "Mad or Bad? Magritte's Artistic Rebellion". The Paris Review. 14 May 2018.
- The phantom photographer, Art in America, Nov 2011
- (with David Levi Strauss, Yasmine El Rashidi, Allan Sekula, Susie Linfield) The Anxiety Of Images, Aperture, Sep 2011
- Mixed Use, Manhattan, Aperture, Mar 2011
- Photographier la catastrophe [Photograph the catastrophe], Terrain, Mar 2010
- Thinking in images, Art In America, 2008, Vol. 96, No. 1.
- Torture à Abou Ghraib : les médias et leur dehors, Multitudes, Jan 2007
- Jean-Etienne Liotard: Facing the enlightenment, Art in America; Nov 2006, Vol. 94 Issue 10, p148.
- Reflections - Susan Sontag 1933-2004, Artforum International, Mar 2005
- Modern style: dressing down (issues raised by Museum of Modern Art's "Fashioning Fiction”), Artforum International, v.42, no.9, 2004 May, p. 192(5) (ISSN: 1086-7058)
- ‘“Confessions of a Snow Queen" and Other Strategies of Self- Representation’. Figurationen, 3(1), pp. 123–140. 2002.
- Male Trouble: A Crisis in Representation, Journal of Aesthetics and Art Criticism, Nov 2001
- The Exceptional Woman: Élisabeth Vigée-Lebrun and the Cultural Politics of Art, Woman's Art Journal, Nov 2000
- The Other Side of Vertu: Alternative Masculinities in the Crucible of Revolution, Art Journal, Oct 1998
- Signs of Age: Representing the Older Body, Art in America, Jul 1998
- Male Trouble: A Crisis in Representation, Art History Vol. 16 No.2 June 1993
- Photography At The Dock: Essays on Photographic History, Institutions, and Practices, The Art Bulletin, Dec 1992
- Living with Contradictions: Critical Practices in the Age of Supply-Side Aesthetics, Social Text, Jan 1989
- "The Legs of the Countess". October. 39. The MIT Press: 65–108. Winter 1986. doi:10.2307/778313. ISSN 0162-2870.
- Reconstructing Documentary: Connie Hatch's Representational Resistance, Camera Obscura: Feminism Culture and Media Studies, Mar 1985
- A Photographer in Jerusalem, 1855: Auguste Salzmann and His Times, October, Vol. 18, (Autumn, 1981), pp. 90–107. The MIT Press
- Photophilia: A Conversation about the Photography Scene, October, Sep 1982
