= Riko Mizuno =

Japanese gallerist, art dealer, and artist

- Born: 1932 (age 93–94); Tokyo, Japan
- Occupations: Artist and art dealer
- Known for: Mizuno Gallery

Riko Mizuno (born 1932) is a gallerist, art dealer, and artist. Born in Tokyo, Japan, she moved to Los Angeles in the 1950s to study ceramics at Chouinard Art Institute. Between 1966 and 1984, Mizuno operated galleries at three locations in Los Angeles.

Artist Vija Celmins characterized Mizuno's contribution to the art world in a 1993 interview with Susan Morgan of the Los Angeles Times: "Riko Mizuno was very important to artists in Los Angeles. She created an incredibly nurturing atmosphere. We would sit around her kitchen, drinking sake, eating her delicious food, and always talking, talking."

== Mizuno Gallery ==
In 1966, Mizuno opened Gallery 669 on La Cienega Boulevard. She collaborated briefly at 669 with Eugenia Butler. In 1969 she re-opened the gallery as Mizuno Gallery. Mizuno Gallery operated until 1984 at three locations: on La Cienega Boulevard, in Little Tokyo, and on N. Robertson Boulevard. Over this period, she exhibited the work of artists such as Larry Bell, Billy Al Bengston, Robert Irwin, Ed Moses, and Ken Price, many of whom had been associated in the 1960s with the Ferus Gallery, as well as the early works of artists who later became notable, such as Chris Burden, Jack Goldstein, Mike Kelley, Alexis Smith, and Doug Wheeler.

In a 1973 article on Burden, Peter Plagens referred to Mizuno's gallery, where Burden had recently performed Dead Man, as a "young artist showplace".
