= The Shapes Project =

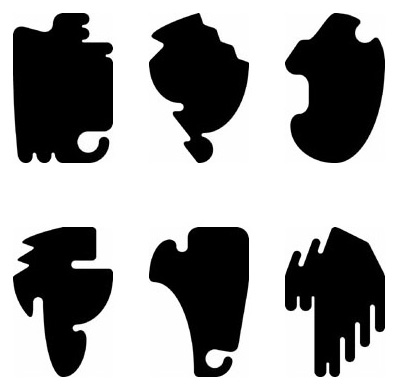
Six Shapes from The Shapes Project

The Shapes Project is a combinatorial system designed by the American artist Allan McCollum, in 2005-2006, to produce unique two-dimensional "shapes." The system allows for the making of enough unique shapes for every person on the planet to have one of their own. It also allows the shapes to be kept track of in such a way as to ensure that no two will ever be alike.

Following the present rate of birth, it is generally estimated that the world population will grow until it "peaks" in the middle of the present century, and then possibly begin to decline. How many people will be alive at this peak are estimated at between 8 billion and 20 billion people, depending upon what factors are considered and who is doing the considering. The most recent estimate published by the United Nations puts the figure at around 9.2 billion in the year 2050.

To make certain that the system will be able to accommodate everyone, it has been organized to produce over 31,000,000,000 different shapes, which is more than the highest population estimates might require.

Shape, from The Shapes Project, carved from Corian, with CNC milling equipment.

For the time being, the potential for producing around 214,000,000 of the shapes have been set aside for creative experimentation. These can be used for many different purposes—not only for fine art and design projects, but also for various social practices: as gifts, awards, identity markers, emblems, insignias, logos, toys, souvenirs, educational games, and so forth.

So far, only home computers have been used to construct Adobe Illustrator vector graphics files that allow the shapes to be produced in many possible ways. The shapes can be printed graphically as silhouettes or outlines, in any size, color or texture, using all varieties of graphics software; or, the files can be used by rapid prototyping machines and computer-numerically-controlled (CNC) equipment—such as routers, laser cutters and waterjet cutters—to build, carve, or cut the shapes from wood, plastic, metal, stone, and other materials.

The basic system for making the shapes has been completed, but the project of actually constructing all of them is much too large for any one person to finish in any single person's lifetime. For this reason, the project has been organized in such a way that others may continue completing them in the artist's absence. The shapes are also being made available to others, with the hope that people will come up with many interesting ways to use them.

In 2007, The Museum of Modern Art acquired 432 of the "Shapes" for its permanent collection.
