= Ger van Elk =

Dutch artist (1941–2014)

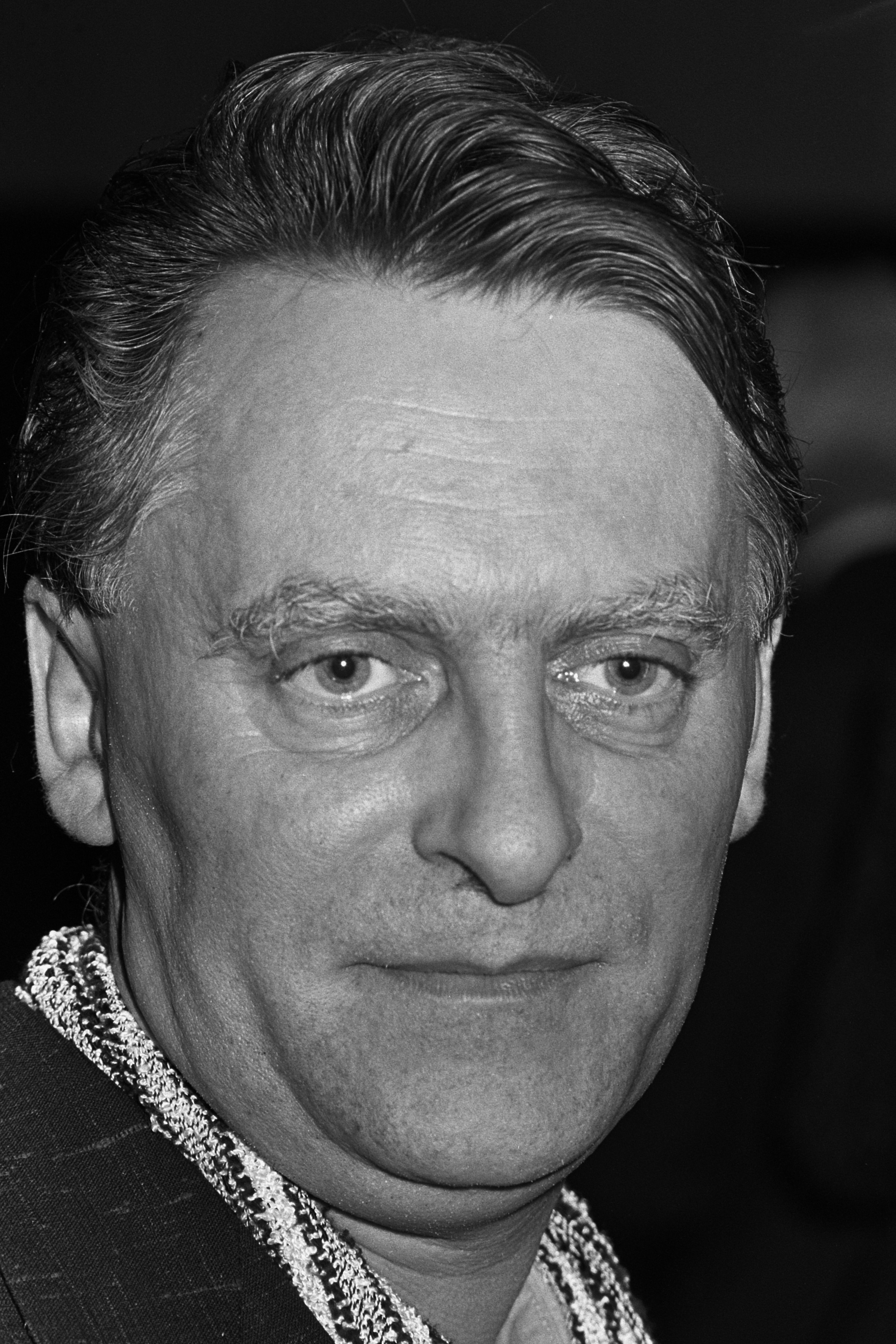
Ger van Elk in 1983

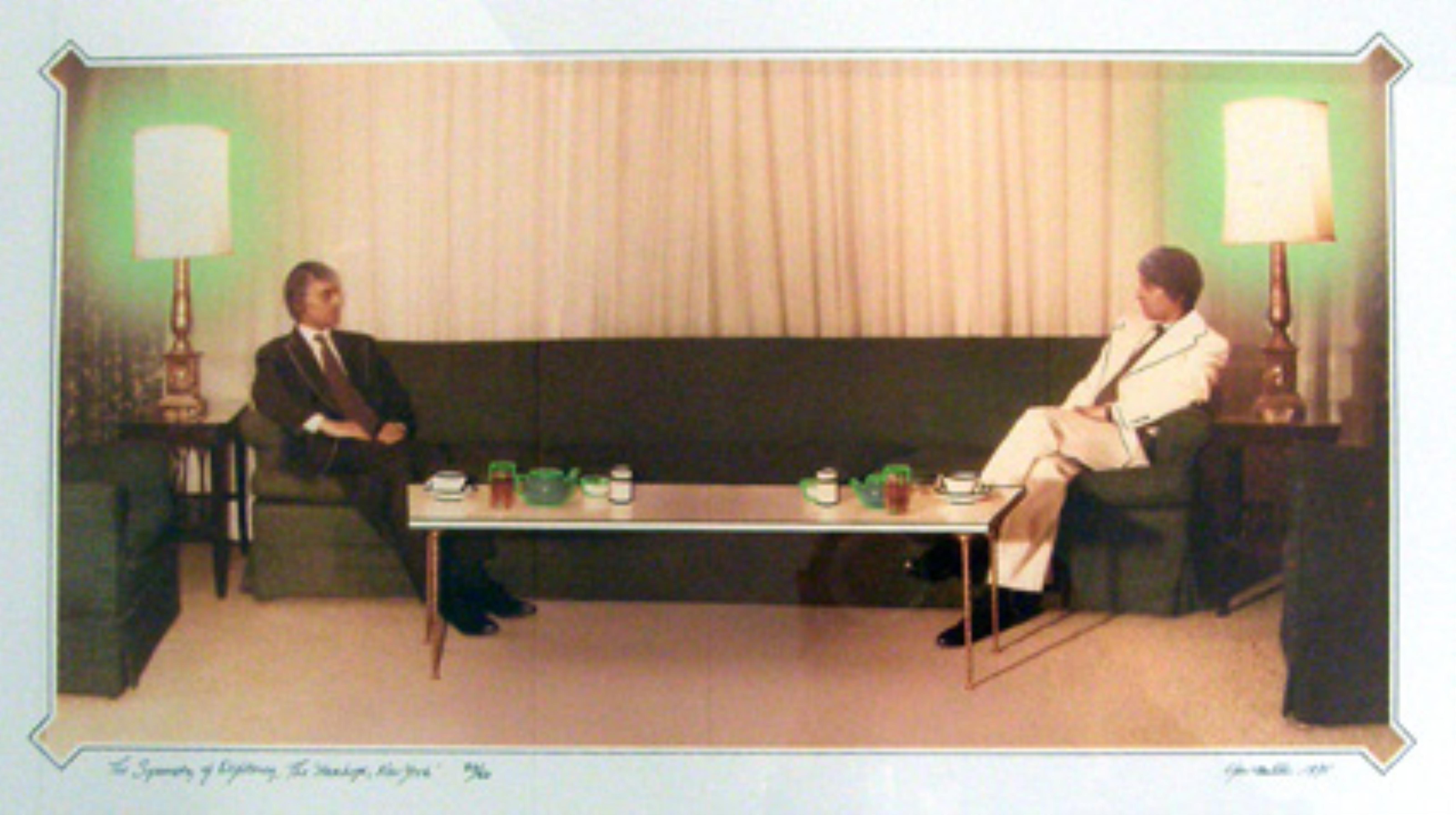
Ger van Elk, Symmetry of Diplomacy, 1975, Groninger Museum.

Ger van Elk (9 March 1941 – 17 August 2014) was a Dutch artist who created sculptures, painted photographs, installations and film. His work has been described as being both conceptual art and arte povera. Between 1959 and 1988 he lived and worked in Los Angeles, New York City, and Amsterdam, except for a period of study in Groningen in the 1960s. In 1996 he won the J. C. van Lanschot Prize for Sculpture.

Ger van Elk had several solo exhibitions at Art & Project from 1970 to 1987. This was his second serious gallery showing in Amsterdam.

Together with Marinus Boezem, Wim T. Schippers and Jan Dibbets, he is seen as one of the main representatives of these movements in the Netherlands. Van Abbemuseum in Eindhoven and the Tate Gallery in London have work of Van Elk in their collection. Reflections on art history are an important part of his work.

== See also ==
- Bas Jan Ader
