= William Leavitt (artist) =

William Leavitt (born 1941) is a conceptual artist known for paintings, photographs, installations, and performance works that examine "the vernacular culture of L.A. through the filter of the entertainment industry...drawing on 'stock environments' and designs of films as well as the literature of the place." A critical figure in the West Coast conceptual art movement of the late 60s, Leavitt himself has managed to maintain a low profile. "Over the last 40 years, William Leavitt has made a name for himself as an influential artist while staying so far out of fame's spotlight that his hard-to-categorize works have been all but invisible to the public," wrote the LA Times. While his work is collected by high-profile artists such as John Baldessari and Mike Kelley (who donated Leavitt works to the Museum of Contemporary Art, Los Angeles), Leavitt himself has eschewed celebrity.

Leavitt received a BFA from University of Colorado, Boulder and a MFA from Claremont Graduate School. Since moving to Los Angeles in 1965 his work evolved, increasingly referencing themes endemic to the city such as the line between reality and fantasy and the nature of illusion.

Leavitt is a contemporary to artists like Allen Ruppersberg, Bruce Nauman, Ed Ruscha, John Baldessari, Bas Jan Ader, Guy de Cointet, and William Wegman, a generation that "distinguished their work from most melancholic Minimal/Conceptual art made in New York and Europe by using deadpan humor, slapstick comedy and the cliche as a way to, as Baldessari put it, 'take conceptual art off of its pedestal, so to speak.'" Leavitt was given a significant survey exhibition by the Museum of Contemporary Art, Los Angeles in 2011, titled Theater Objects. Despite Leavitt's long history of exhibitions in New York, Los Angeles, and abroad, the Theater Objects retrospective was described as "a revelation" by art critic Christopher Knight.

Leavitt is represented by Greene Naftali Gallery, New York.

== Awards and honors ==
Leavitt received the National Endowment for the Arts Fellowship for New Genres in 1991, the J. Paul Getty Fellowship in 1993, a Guggenheim Grant in 1998, and a United States Artists fellowship in 2012. among other awards.

== Personal life ==
Born in Washington, D.C., Leavitt moved to Los Angeles in 1965. There, he shuns the spotlight—living and working with his wife, also a painter, in two small cabins near Silver Lake, atop a hill accessible only by foot. In addition to painting, photography, and installation work, the multi-talented Leavitt writes plays, builds theatrical sets, and handcrafts cellos on which he performs with local groups.
