= Michael Asher (artist) =

American conceptual artist (1943–2012)

- Born: July 15, 1943; Los Angeles, California, U.S.
- Died: October 15, 2012 (aged 69); Los Angeles, California, U.S.
- Education: University of California, Irvine (BA)
- Occupation: Visual artist
- Movement: Conceptual art

Michael Max Asher (July 15, 1943 – October 15, 2012) was an American conceptual artist, described by The New York Times as "among the patron saints of the Conceptual Art phylum known as Institutional Critique, an often esoteric dissection of the assumptions that govern how we perceive art." Rather than designing new art objects, Asher typically altered the existing environment, by repositioning or removing artworks, walls, facades, etc.

Asher was also a highly regarded professor of art, who spent decades on the faculty at California Institute of the Arts. Cited by numerous successful artists as an important influence in their development, Asher's teaching has been described by British journalist Sarah Thornton as his "most influential" work.

== Early life and education ==
Born in Los Angeles, California, Asher is the son of gallerist Betty Asher and Leonard Asher. While in high school, one of his classmates was future colleague, Thom Andersen. He studied at the University of California, Irvine, where he received his bachelor's degree in fine arts in 1966.

== Life and career ==
He began teaching at the California Institute of the Arts in 1973, along with other influential artist-professors like John Baldessari, Judy Chicago and Allan Kaprow. His "post-studio art" course consisted of intensive group critiques that can focus on a single work for eight hours or more. His Writings, 1973–1983, on Works 1969-1979, co-authored by the art historian Benjamin H. D. Buchloh, was published by The Press of the Nova Scotia College of Art and Design.

Chapter 2 of Seven Days in the Art World by Sarah Thornton is set in Asher's Post-Studio Crit class. Thornton describes the Crit as a "rite of passage" for the students and as the artist's "most influential" work - "an institutional critique that reveals the limits of the rest of the curriculum."

On medical leave from CalArts since 2008, Asher died Sunday, October 15, 2012 after a long illness. He was 69.

== Works ==
Asher's work takes the form of "subtle yet deliberate interventions – additions, subtractions or alterations – in particular environments." His pieces were always site-specific; they were always temporary, and whatever was made or moved for them was destroyed or put back after the exhibitions.

Much of Asher's work, especially in the 1970s, focused upon the specific idiosyncrasies of the gallery as an artistic space. Asher conceived spatial and curatorial choices of the gallery as their own minimalist works, conceptually focused around the viewer's perception.

His work in the late 1960s and early 1970s consisted of dividing up gallery spaces using partition walls and curtains, and designing environments that reflected or absorbed sound. For his first solo exhibition at the La Jolla Museum of Art, Asher installed a tone generator in one of the gallery walls that effectively cancelled out all sound waves in the room, creating a dead zone in the center of the gallery. In 1969, for the group show “Anti-Illusion: Procedures/Materials” at the Whitney Museum of American Art, he concealed a blower above a door to create a slab of air that visitors passed through when they moved from one gallery to the next. In the 1970s he began to remove elements from spaces, for example sandblasting away layers of paint (at Galleria Toselli, Milan, in 1973) or removing the partition walls separating an exhibition space from the gallery office. More dramatically, in his piece Installation (1970) at Pomona College, he created a work by reconfiguring the interior space of a gallery and then leaving the gallery open, without a door, 24 hours a day, introducing light and the noise of the street into the gallery as experiential elements. For another early work at the Claire Copley Gallery in Los Angeles, in 1974, he removed a crucial wall that protected the office space from view, framing the art gallery's behind-the-scenes business operations as something worth viewing itself. Further exploration into the workings of the gallery as institution took place in 1977, where he held an exhibition in both the Claire Copley and Morgan Thomas galleries. The exhibition took on the function of transposer, placing both gallery owners in the space of the other, displaying their own unique curatorial choices. In 1979 he started to reposition objects in museum collections. Sometimes Asher gathers facts, like the list he published of all the artworks ever deaccessioned by the Museum of Modern Art. For a show at the Santa Monica Museum of Art in 2008, he decided to re-create all the 44 stud walls that have been built for every exhibition since the museum relocated to Bergamot Station in May 1998. Architectural floor plans for those 44 exhibitions, captioned with the title and dates of each one, are displayed in a small gallery at the show's entrance, providing a key to what visitors are about to see.

His untitled 1991 work featuring a functional, polished, granite drinking fountain juxtaposed with a flag pole was his first permanent public outdoor work in the United States. Part of the Stuart Collection of public art on the campus of the University of California, San Diego, this drinking fountain is an exact replica of commercial metal fountains typically found in business offices and government buildings. Instead of its usual context as interior office furniture, the fountain is placed monument like on a grass island in the center of the campus. It marks the site as the former Camp Matthews, a military training facility from 1917 to 1964. The piece was destroyed by a sledgehammer-wielding vandal on January 13, 2015.

== Exhibitions and awards ==
Asher exhibited at documenta (1972, 1982), the MoMA (1979), and the Venice Biennale (1976), and his solo museum shows include the Centre Pompidou (1991), Los Angeles County Museum of Art (2003), Art Institute of Chicago (2005) and Santa Monica Museum of Art (2008).

Asher won the Bucksbaum Award 2010. The jury consisted of: Adam D. Weinberg, the Whitney’s Alice Pratt Brown Director; Donna De Salvo, Whitney Associate Director of Programs and Chief Curator; the 2010 curators Francesco Bonami and Gary Carrion-Murayari; and three guest panelists, Hou Hanru (San Francisco Art Institute), Yasmil Raymond (Dia Art Foundation), and James Rondeau (Art Institute of Chicago). The winner received $100,000 and a solo exhibition at the Whitney Museum of American Art. His project for the 2010 Whitney Biennial involved having the museum remain open 24 hours a day for one week (although this was shortened to three days by the museum due to “budgetary and human resources limitations”).

In the mid-1970s, after a dispute with gallery dealer, Heiner Friedrich, Asher decided to use contractual agreements in order to control the production, dissemination and ownership of his art projects. Using Seth Siegelaub and Robert Projanksy's contract, The Artists Reserved Rights Transfer and Sale Agreement, as a model, Asher crafted his own contract with the help of Los Angeles attorney, Arthur Alef.
