= Allen Ruppersberg =

American painter

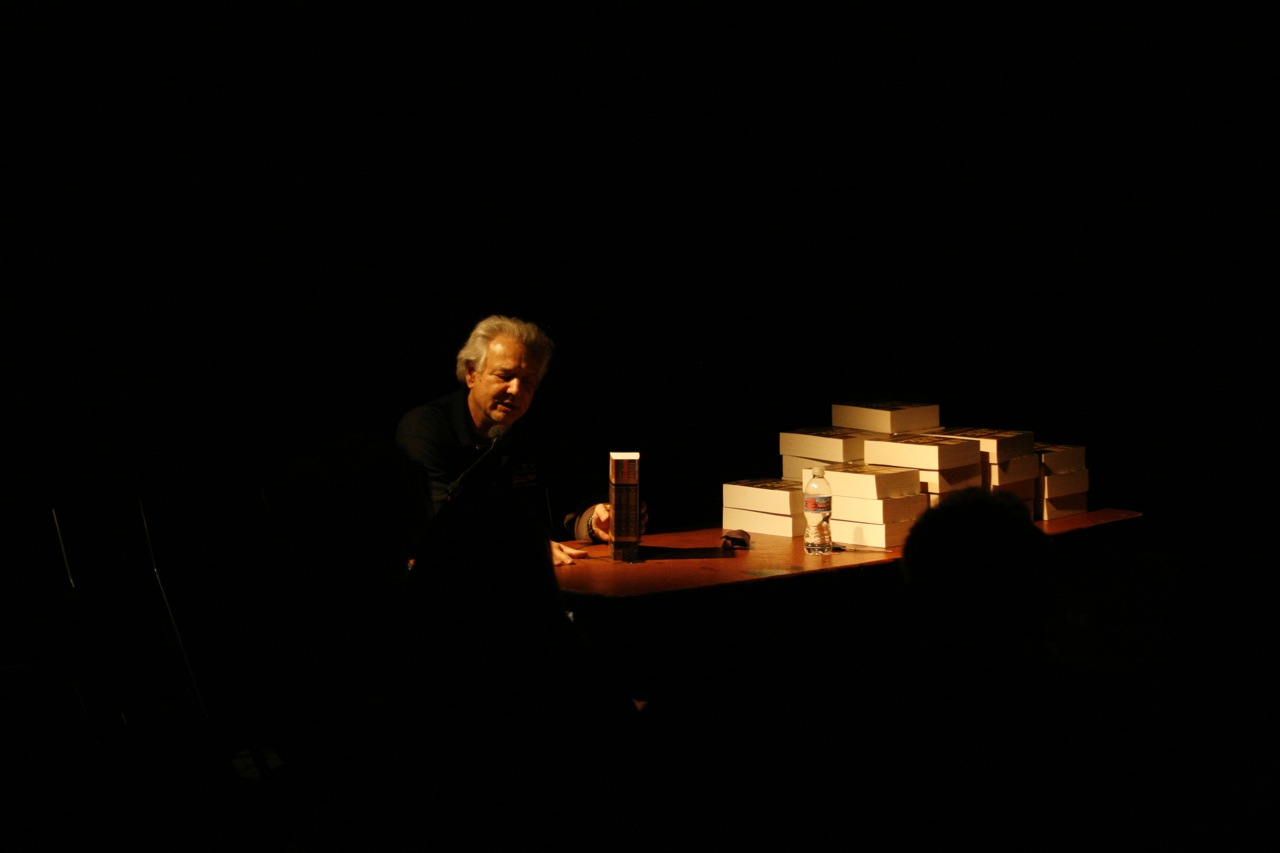
- Ruppersberg presents a book-give-away performance of The New Five Foot Shelf paperback book.
- Born: 1944 (age 81–82); Cleveland, Ohio, United States
- Known for: Conceptual art, Painting, Sculpture, Installation art

Allen Ruppersberg (born 1944) is an American conceptual artist based in Los Angeles and New York City.

He is one of the first generation of American conceptual artists that changed the way art was thought about and made. His work includes paintings, prints, photographs, sculptures, installations and books.

== Early life and education ==
Born in Cleveland, Ohio, Ruppersberg graduated in 1967 with a Bachelor of Fine Arts degree from the Chouinard Art Institute (now the California Institute of the Arts) in Los Angeles, California.

== Career ==
During his early years in Los Angeles, he began significant relationships with John Baldessari, William Leavitt, Ed Ruscha, William Wegman and Allan McCollum. He participated in the 1969 exhibition When Attitudes Become Form, and is recognized as a seminal practitioner of installation art, having produced works including Al's Cafe (1969), Al's Grand Hotel (1971) and The Novel that Writes Itself (1978).

He moved to New York in 1985.

=== Exhibitions ===
Since the late 1960s, his work has been the subject of over sixty solo exhibitions and nearly 200 group shows. In 1985, the Museum of Contemporary Art, Los Angeles organized an exhibition of Ruppersberg's work, which subsequently traveled to the New Museum of Contemporary Art in New York City.

His work can be found in permanent collections of museums internationally, including:

- Foundation de Appel, Amsterdam, The Netherlands
- Museum für Moderne Kunst, Frankfurt, Germany
- Museum of Modern Art, New York City, New York, United States
- Museum of Contemporary Art, Los Angeles, Los Angeles, California, United States
- Whitney Museum of American Art, New York City, New York, United States

=== Artist's philosophy ===
Ruppersberg's philosophy is to use language as a means of expression in its own right. He drew on all the different sectors of the mass media and the consumer society from a critical viewpoint.

=== Works ===
- The New Five Foot Shelf. The installation consists of 50 books and 44 posters. Dimension of the installation: variable. Limited edition of 10 copies and 2 artist’s proofs. Produced and published in 2001 by Editions Micheline Szwajcer & Michèle Didier. Voir mfc-michèle didier
- "The New Five Foot Shelf of Books" – installation, produced and published in 2003 by Editions Micheline Szwajcer and Michèle Didier, Brussels. Voir mfc-michèle didier
- "Chapter VI" – artist book, produced and published in 2009 by mfc-michèle didier, Brussels
- The Novel That Writes Itself, artist book, produced and published in 2014 by mfc-michèle didier, Brussels

=== Awards ===
- United States Artists 2011 Oliver Fellow for Visual Arts

== Personal life ==
Ruppersberg lives and works in Los Angeles and New York City. Ruppersberg is in a long term relationship for the past 12 years with Annette Leddy.

== See also ==
- List of American artists 1900 and after
- List of California Institute of the Arts people
- List of painters by name
- List of people from Cleveland
- List of people from Los Angeles
- List of people from New York City
- List of photographers
- List of recent Whitney Biennial artists
- List of sculptors
- Visual art of the United States

== Suggested reading ==
- Allen Ruppersberg: One of Many, by Allen Ruppersberg Publisher: Walther Konig, 2006
- Allen Ruppersberg: What One Loves About Life Are the Things That Fade, by Allan McCollum
