= El Centinela (Baja California) =

Mountain in Baja California, Mexico

Mount Signal
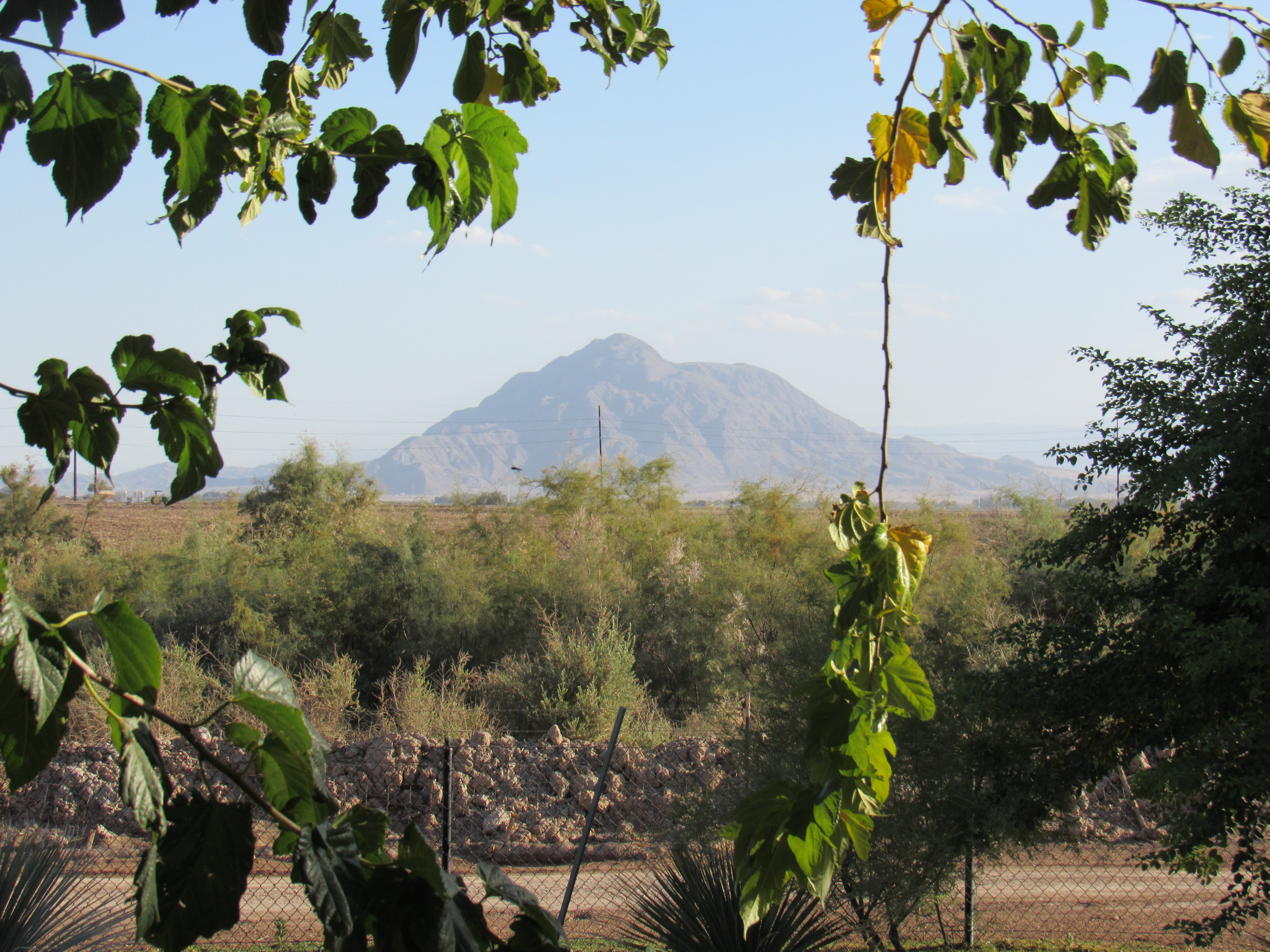
- Mount Signal or El Centinela as seen from Santa Rosa de las Lajas or Yuha well in the south of Imperial County. The shape of this Mountain is that of the image of the summit depicted in the official Imperial County seal.

Highest point
- Elevation: 781 m (2,562 ft)
- Coordinates: 32°37′16″N 115°42′35″W

Geography
- Location within Mexico
- Location: Mexicali Municipality
- Parent range: Cocopah mountains (sierra cucapá)

Mount Signal is a mountain 20 km (12 mi) west of Mexicali, Baja California, Mexico, on Mexican Federal Highway 2. The peak is also known as 'Weeishpa' by the native Kumiai community, 'Cerro del Centinela,' or simply, El Centinela by Mexicans. The northern slope of the mountain begins at the border between Mexico and the United States, the south side is bordered by Federal Highway 2. It has an elevation of about 781 meter and is the northernmost peak of the Cocopah mountain range or sierra cucapá.

Mount Signal was used by both native and pioneer explorers of the region, to guide them through the desert. The mountain is on the shield of the town of Mexicali and on the shield and flag of Imperial County, California but each from their own perspective. The song Puro Cachanilla also mentions this mountain.
