= Buffalo AKG Art Museum =

Art museum in Buffalo, New York

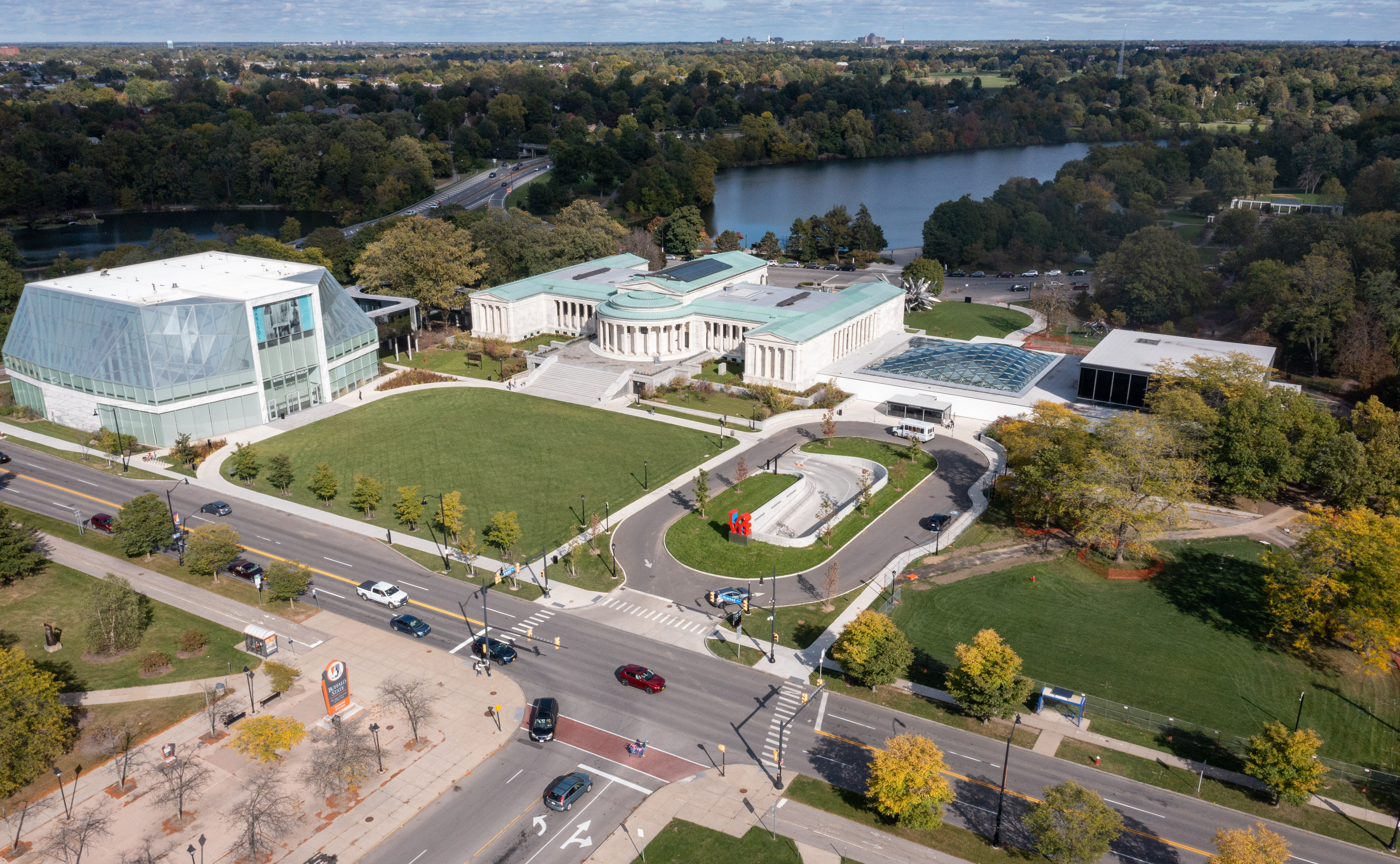
- Aerial view of the Buffalo AKG Art Museum (October 2024)
- Interactive fullscreen map
- Former names: Albright–Knox Art Gallery (1962–2023); Albright Art Gallery (1905–1962)
- Established: May 31, 1905
- Location: 1285 Elmwood Avenue, Buffalo, New York
- Coordinates: 42°55′57″N 78°52′32″W
- Type: Art museum
- Director: Janne Sirén
- Architects: Augustus Saint Gaudens, Edward Brodhead Green; Gordon Bunshaft (1962); Shohei Shigematsu (2023)
- Parking: Underground
- Website: www.buffaloakg.org

U.S. National Register of Historic Places
- Designated: May 27, 1971
- Reference no.: 71000538

New York State Register of Historic Places
- Designated: June 23, 1980
- Reference no.: 02940.000025

The Buffalo AKG Art Museum, formerly known as the Albright–Knox Art Gallery, is an art museum located adjacent to Delaware Park, Buffalo, New York, United States.

The museum shows modern art and contemporary art. It is directly opposite Buffalo State University and the Burchfield Penney Art Center. It is named after three major donors, John J. Albright, Seymour H. Knox II, and Jeffrey Gundlach.

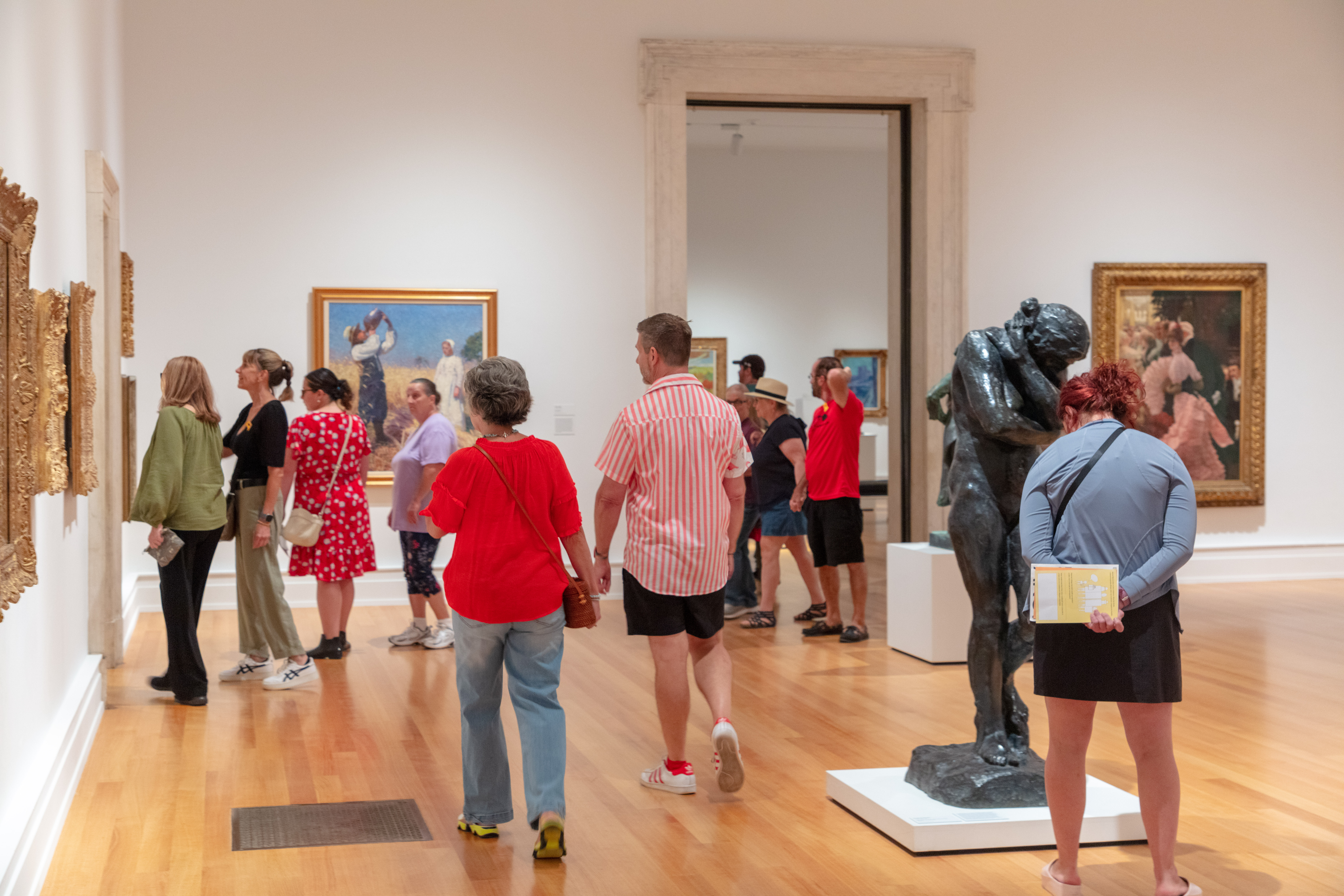
An interior gallery of the Wilmers Building

== History ==
The parent organization of the Buffalo AKG Art Museum is the Buffalo Fine Arts Academy, founded in 1862, one of the oldest public arts institutions in the United States. On January 15, 1900, Buffalo entrepreneur and philanthropist John J. Albright, a wealthy Buffalo industrialist, donated funds to the Academy to begin construction of an art gallery. The building was designed by prominent local architect Edward Brodhead Green. It was originally intended to be used as the Fine Arts Pavilion for the Pan-American Exposition in 1901, but delays in its construction caused it to remain uncompleted until 1905. When it finally opened its doors on May 31, 1905, it was named the Albright Art Gallery.

Clifton Hall, the third building on the museum's campus, was constructed in 1920 as the Buffalo Society of Natural Sciences. In 1927, the dilapidated building was renovated until 1929, when it was reopened as the Albright Art School. The sponsor was Charles Clifton, which is why the building was named Clifton Hall.

In 1962, a new addition was made to the gallery through the contributions of Seymour H. Knox, Jr. and his family, and many other donors. At this time, the museum was renamed the Albright–Knox Art Gallery. The new building was designed by Skidmore, Owings and Merrill architect Gordon Bunshaft, who is noted for the Lever House in New York City. The Buffalo AKG Art Museum is listed in the National Register of Historic Places.

The museum first began discussing a possible expansion in 2001. In 2012, the board commissioned the architectural firm Snøhetta to produce a master plan for future growth. In 2014, the board voted to initiate a museum expansion and, in June 2016, the museum announced its selection of OMA partner Shohei Shigematsu as the architect for the project. It is the first art museum designed by this association of architects in the United States. Doubleline CEO and Buffalo native Jeffrey Gundlach pledged $42.5 million to the project, while businesses, foundations, government groups, and individuals promised matching funds toward a $125 million goal. Another 20 million came from New York State. In recognition of Gundlach's donation, a newly constructed building was named the Jeffrey E. Gundlach Building. The museum would be renamed the Buffalo AKG Art Museum, representing the names of the museum's historical donors, on the completion of the renovations and its reopening in spring 2023.

The Seymour H. Knox Building, until its renovation, had an open courtyard that was not accessible to museum visitors. As part of the redesign of the terrain, a new artwork, Common Sky, was designed by artist Ólafur Elíasson and architect Sebastian Behmann of Studio Other Spaces, enclosing the courtyard: "At once architectural and sculptural, Common Sky presents a canopy of glass and mirrors rendered in alternating triangular segments that allow the light to pour into the space below. Visitors can look up and see themselves reflected in the mirrors too, creating a synergistic and kaleidoscopic pushing and pulling of reflections and space. Common Sky’s form tapers into the courtyard itself, with a cyclone-shaped column that leads to a complex system of drains below. This asymmetrical element nods both to the location of a lone hawthorn tree planted in the original courtyard in the 1960s, while simultaneously serving as a drainage system of rain and snow that Buffalo is famed for." The resulting 6,000 square feet (560 m^{2}) community gathering space was given the name "Ralph C. Wilson, Jr. Town Square" in honor of the $11 million donation of Ralph C. Wilson, Jr. and the Wilson Foundation for the renovation.

Clifton Hall houses, among other things, the museum's archives, offices for the staff as well as the "F. Paul Norton and Frederic P. Norton Family Prints And Drawings Study Center", and working spaces for the Public Art Initiative. The first project of the Public Art Initiative was Matthew Hoffman's "You Are Beautiful".

The Seymour H. Knox Building now includes rooms where visitors can participate in art workshops themselves, the so-called Creative Commons, which represents the first cooperation of the Lego Foundation with a museum. Likewise, it houses the Cornelia restaurant, which features an almost 30-foot-high (9.1 m) glass mosaic by artist Firelei Báez.

The Jeffrey E. Gundlach Building, a circular glass building, opened in August of 2023 and added more than 50,000 square feet (4,600 m^{2}) to the museum's exhibition and five studio classrooms. The first floor of the building houses the Nordic Gallery, dedicated to contemporary Scandinavian art. The third floor of the building showcases the museum's new acquisitions.

The museum is part of the Monuments Men and Women Museum Network, launched in 2021 by the Monuments Men Foundation for the Preservation of Art.

In November 2023, a unionization campaign was launched by museum employees across the visitor experience, facilities, and food services departments, with employees filing a petition for the election with the National Labor Relations Board in January 2024. 71 employees are set to vote on January 25, 2024 on whether to join AKG Workers United. This vote follows AKG Workers United filing unfair labor practice charges against the museum, accusing its leadership of "heightening surveillance of employees and re-enforcing workplace rules in direct response to unionization efforts." Museum officials have denied these allegations and have stated: "Regardless of the decision, we are committed to continuing to work collaboratively to support all of our Buffalo AKG team.”

== Exhibitions ==
In 1910, the museum hosted the International Exhibition of Pictorial Photography (November 3–December 1, 1910), curated by Alfred Stieglitz. It was the first ever show organized by an American museum that aimed to elevate photography's stature to that of a fine art.

In 1978, the museum's exhibition on the work of Richard Diebenkorn was chosen to represent the United States at the 28th Venice Biennale. In 1988, the museum again won the competition to organize the exhibition representing the United States in Venice; the museum's curator Michael G. Auping proposed media artist Jenny Holzer.

== Collection ==
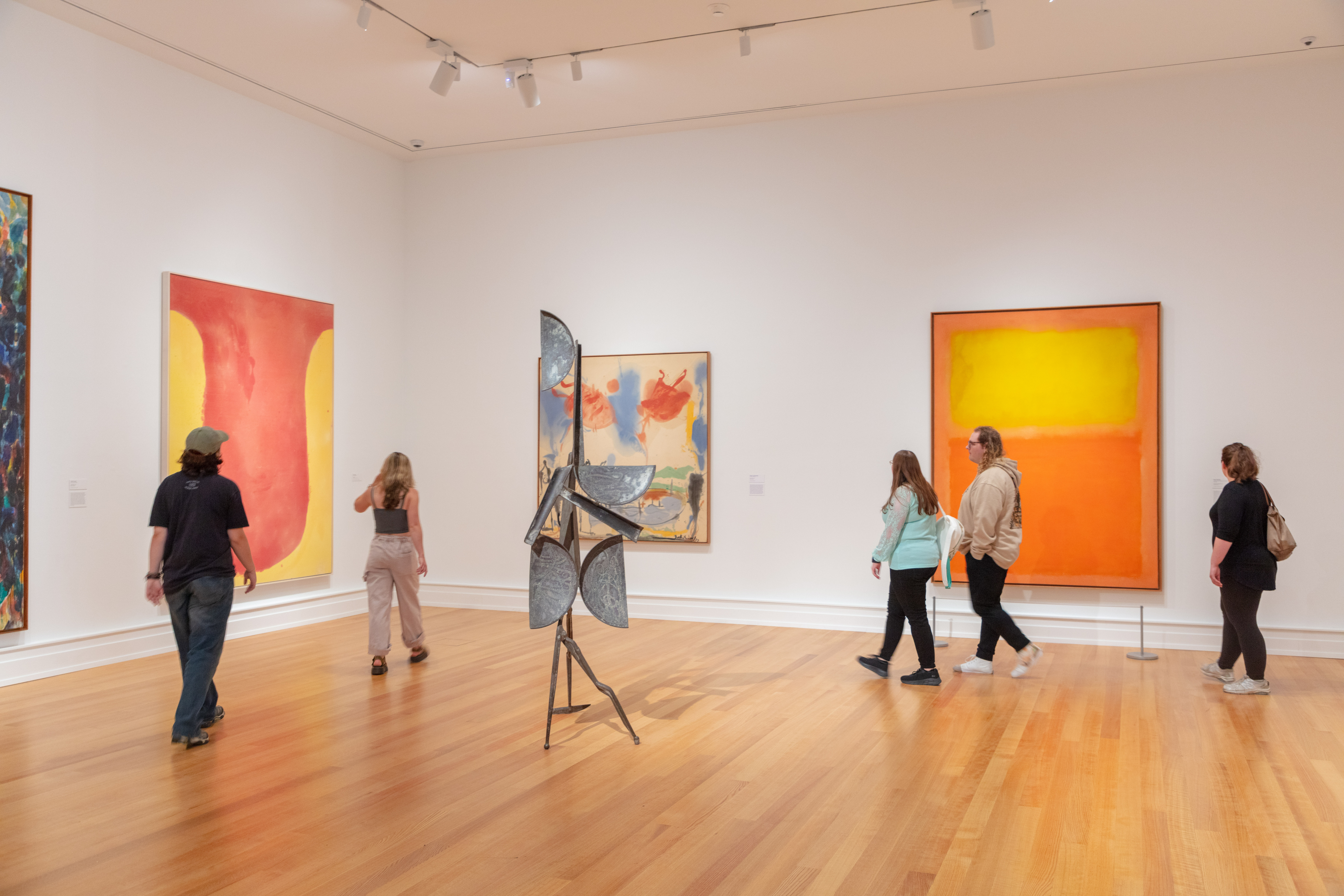
An interior gallery of the Wilmers Building

The Buffalo AKG Art Museum has long operated not by collecting artists' work in depth, but by trying to acquire key works. The gallery's collection includes works spanning Impressionistic and Post-Impressionistic styles by artists of the nineteenth century such as Paul Gauguin, Edgar Degas, Berthe Morisot, Claude Monet, and Vincent van Gogh.

Revolutionary styles from the early twentieth century such as abstraction, cubism, surrealism, and constructivism are represented in works by artists like Pablo Picasso, Georges Braque, Jean Metzinger, Albert Gleizes, Henri Matisse, André Derain, Joan Miró, Piet Mondrian, Giacomo Balla, Sonia Delaunay, Georgia O'Keeffe, Amedeo Modigliani, and Alexander Rodchenko. Frida Kahlo is represented by Self-Portrait with Monkey.

Because of Seymour H. Knox and Gordon M. Smith, a former director, the Albright-Knox was one of the first museums to collect Abstract Expressionism in depth. That movement is widely represented in the collection with works by artists including Arshile Gorky, Jackson Pollock, Joan Mitchell, Franz Kline, Robert Motherwell, Adolph Gottlieb, and Helen Frankenthaler. The museum owns the second-largest collection of paintings by Clyfford Still: 33 abstract works that span the most critical developments of his career from 1937 to 1963. They include 31 paintings donated to the museum in 1964 by Still and two paintings acquired in 1957 and 1959 as gifts of Seymour H. Knox, Jr.

Additionally, the gallery is rich in further examples of post-war American and European art. Works of pop art, minimalism, and art of the 1970s through the end of the twentieth century can be found represented by artists such as Lee Bontecou, Chryssa, Alberto Giacometti, Eva Hesse, Robert Rauschenberg, Jasper Johns, Howardena Pindell, Ed Clark, Kiki Smith, Félix González-Torres, and Andy Warhol.

At her death in 2016 pop artist Marisol left her estate to the museum including hundreds of works of art, making it the largest collection of her work in the world.

Their contemporary collection includes pieces by artists such as Cory Arcangel, Tony Conrad, Mark Bradford, Nick Cave, Simone Leigh, Georg Baselitz, John Connell, and Per Kirkeby. The museum bought Anselm Kiefer's large-scale Die Milchstrasse (The Milkyway) (1985–1987) in 1988 to celebrate its 125th anniversary.

Before its 2019-2023 expansion, the Buffalo AKG Art Museum exhibition space could accommodate only 200 works — just 3% of its 6,740-piece collection.

== Selected collection highlights ==
=== Paintings ===
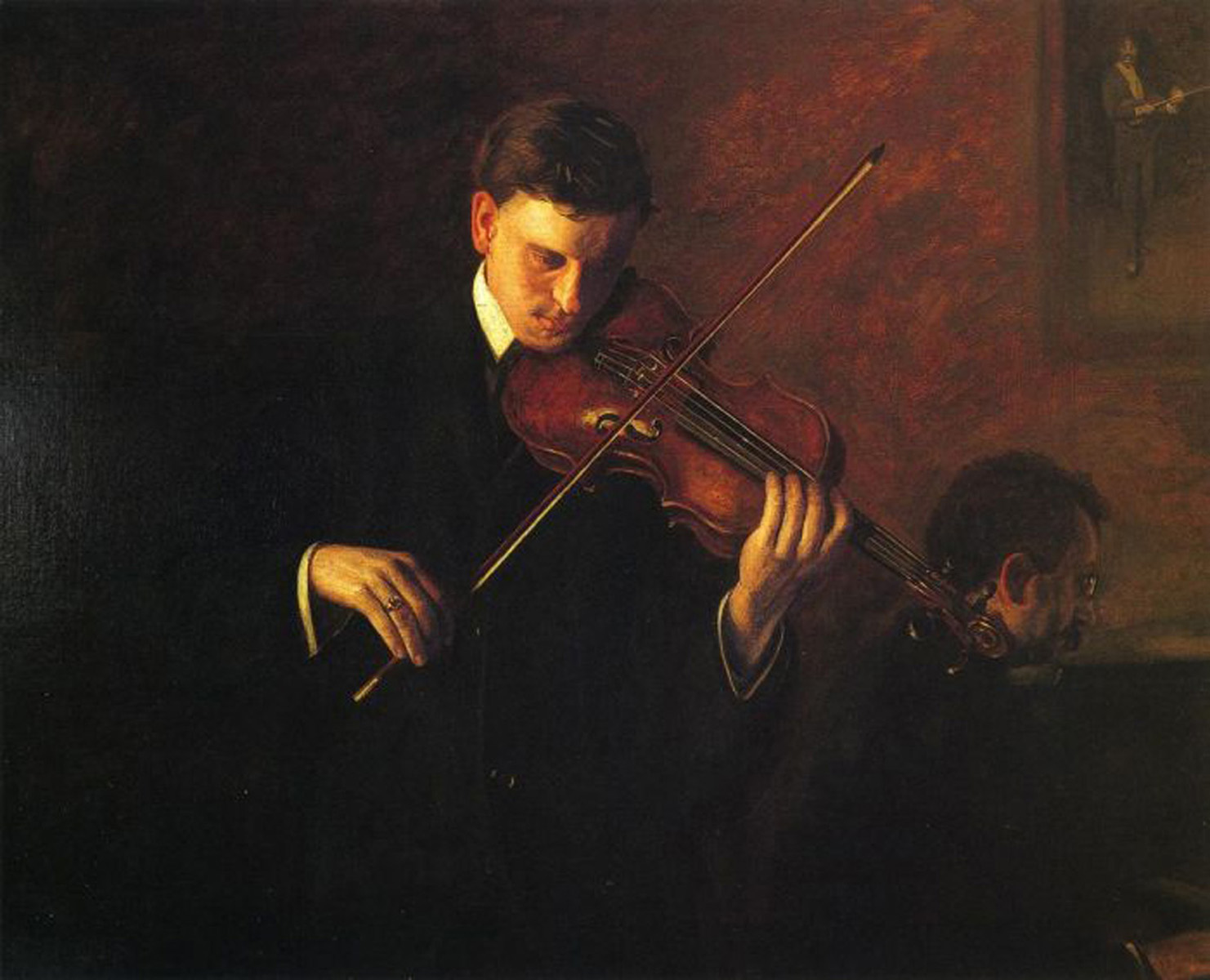
Thomas Eakins, Music, 1904

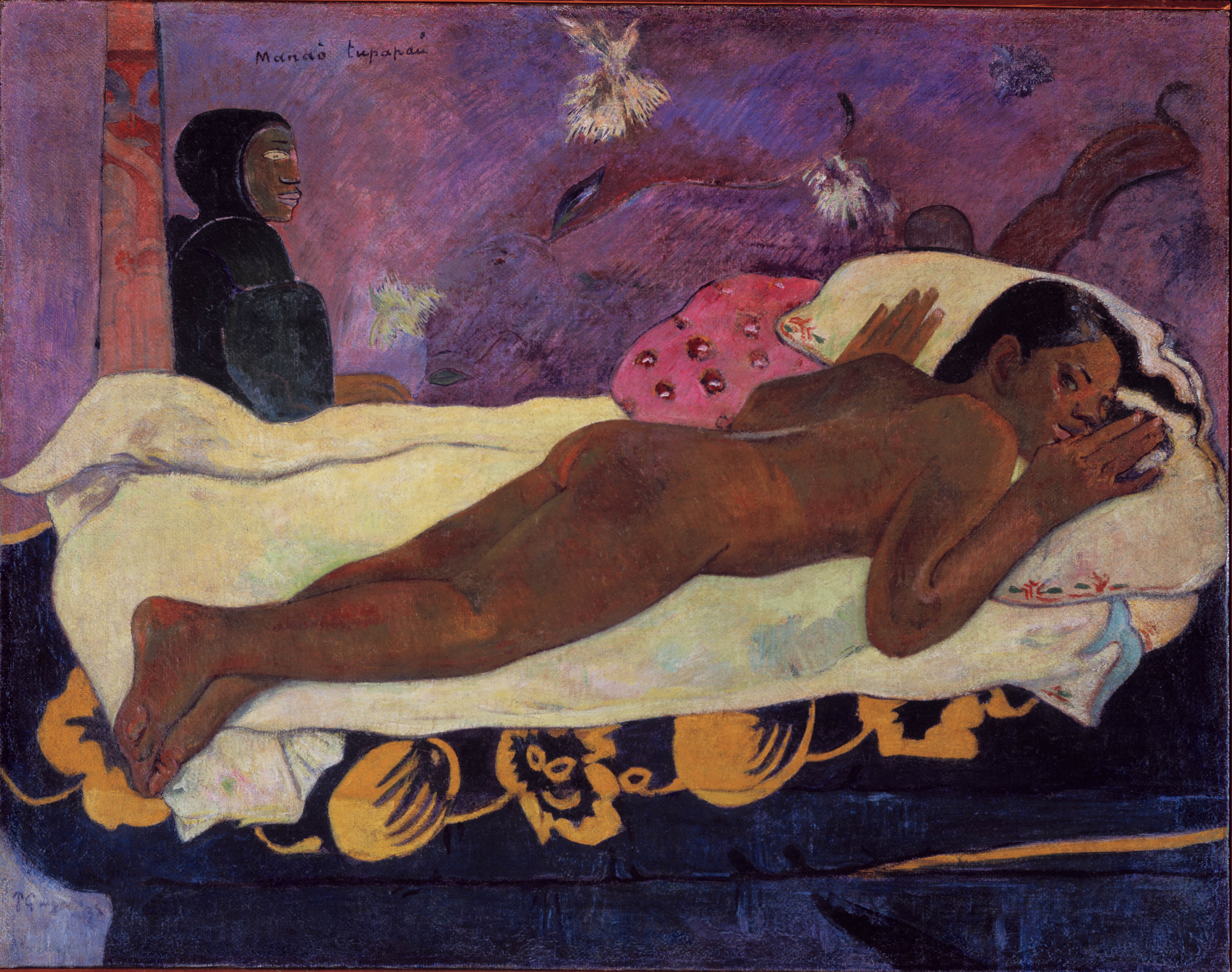
Paul Gauguin, Spirit of the Dead Watching, 1892

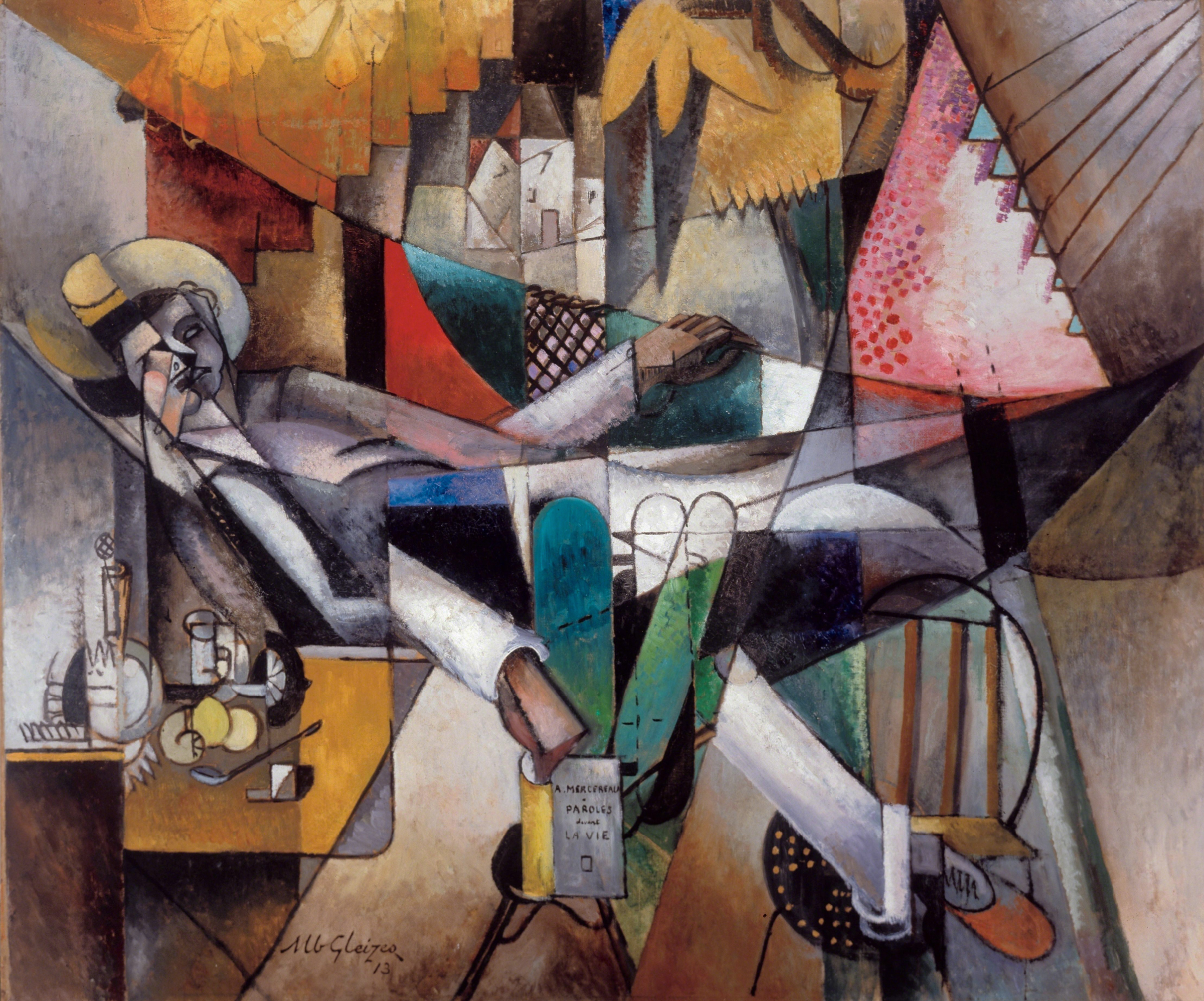
Albert Gleizes, L'Homme au Hamac (Man in a Hammock), 1913

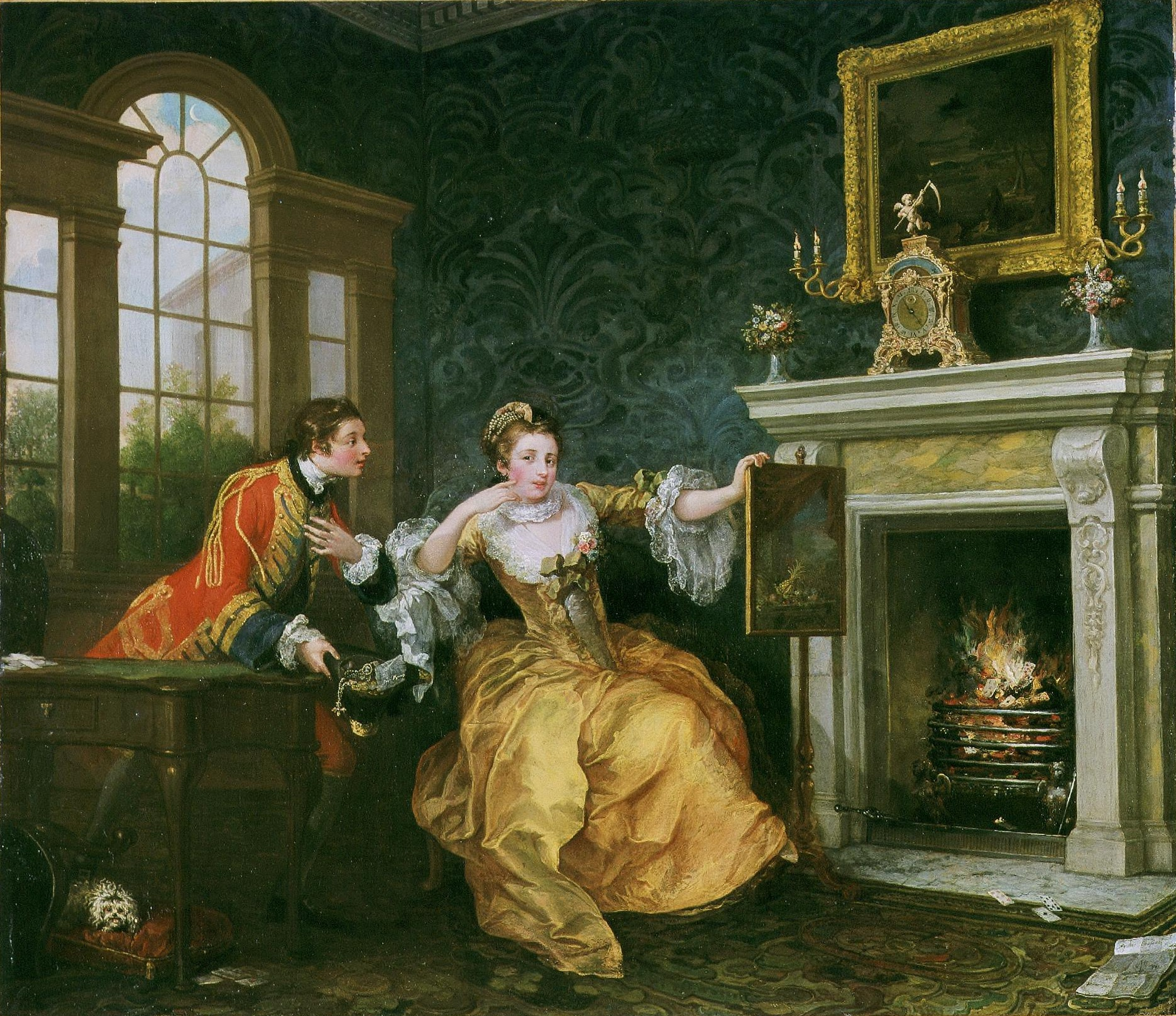
William Hogarth, The Lady's Last Stake, 1759

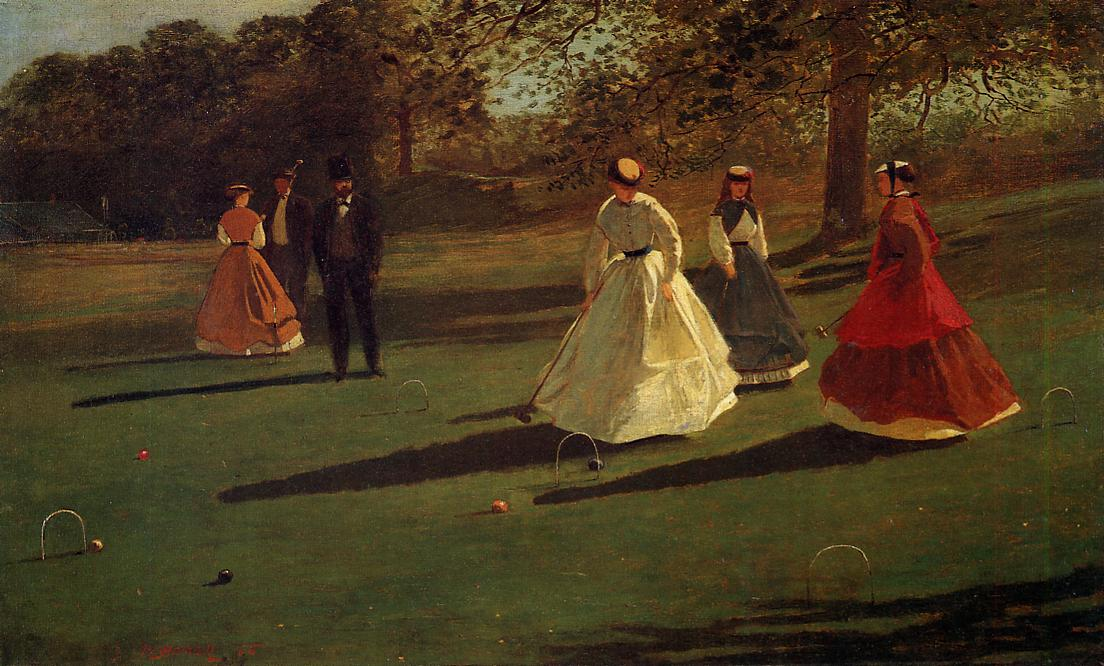
Winslow Homer, Croquet Players, 1865

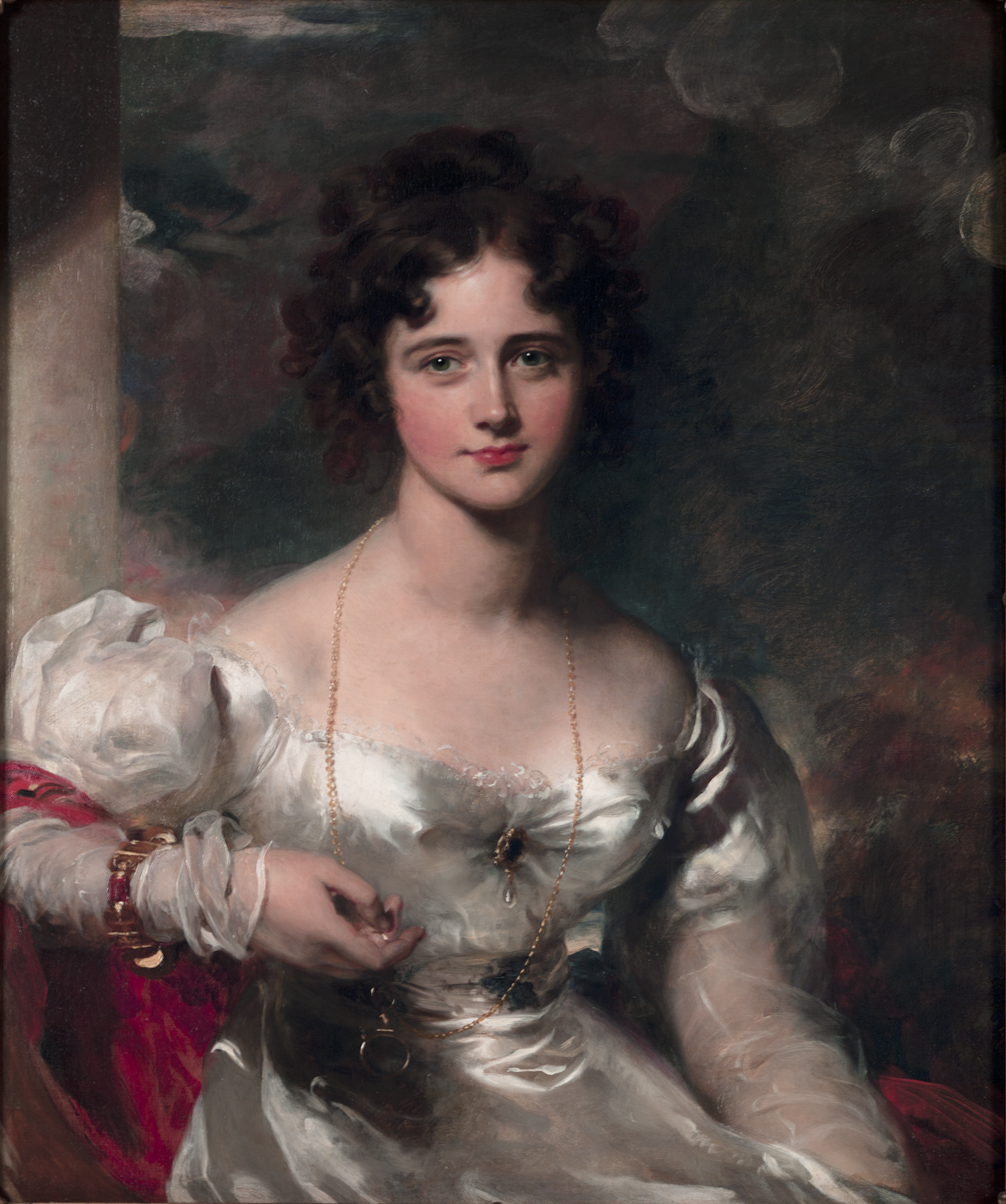
Thomas Lawrence, Portrait of Rosamond Croker, 1827

Jean Metzinger, Danseuse au café (Dancer in a café), 1912

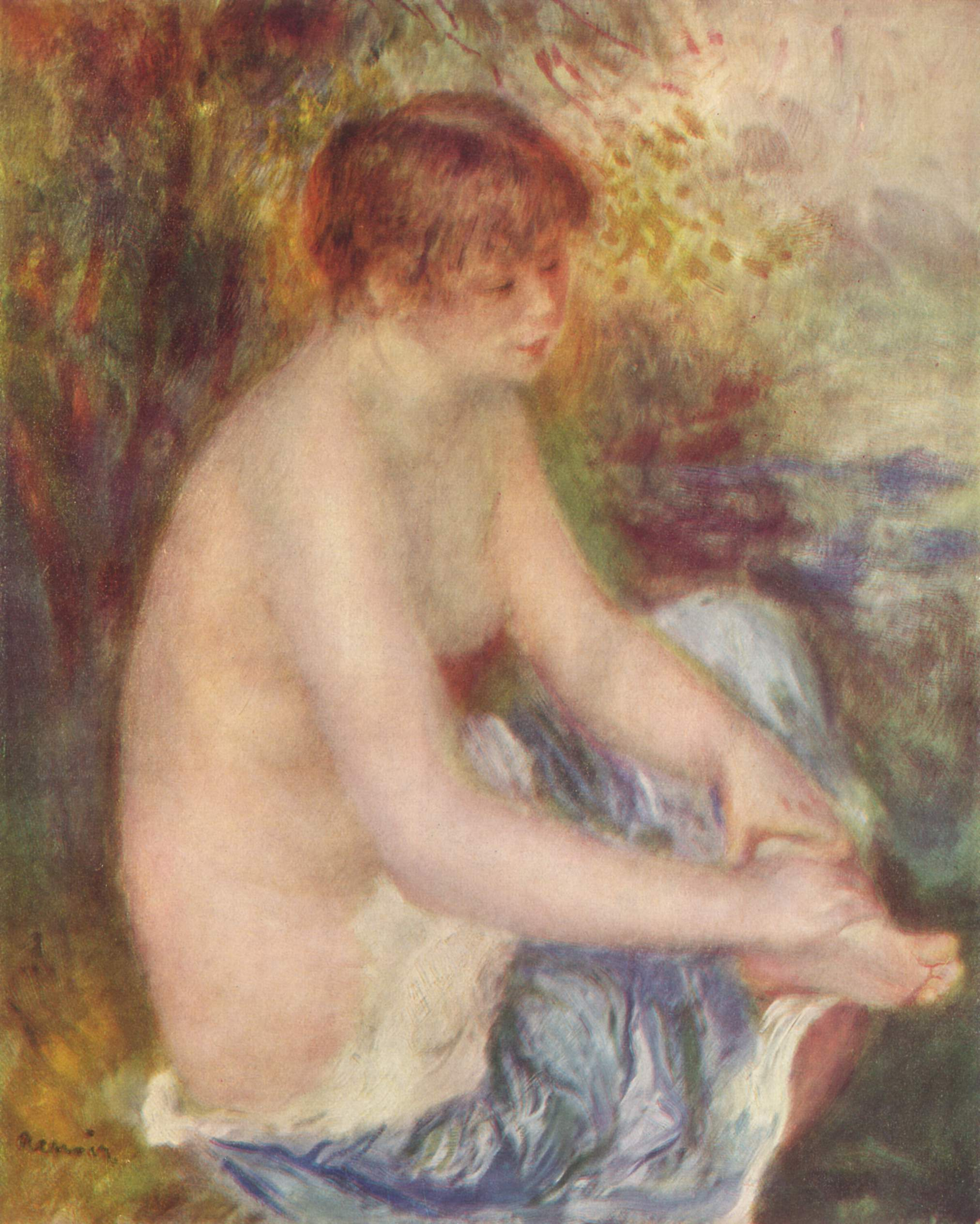
Pierre-Auguste Renoir, Small Nude in Blue, 1879

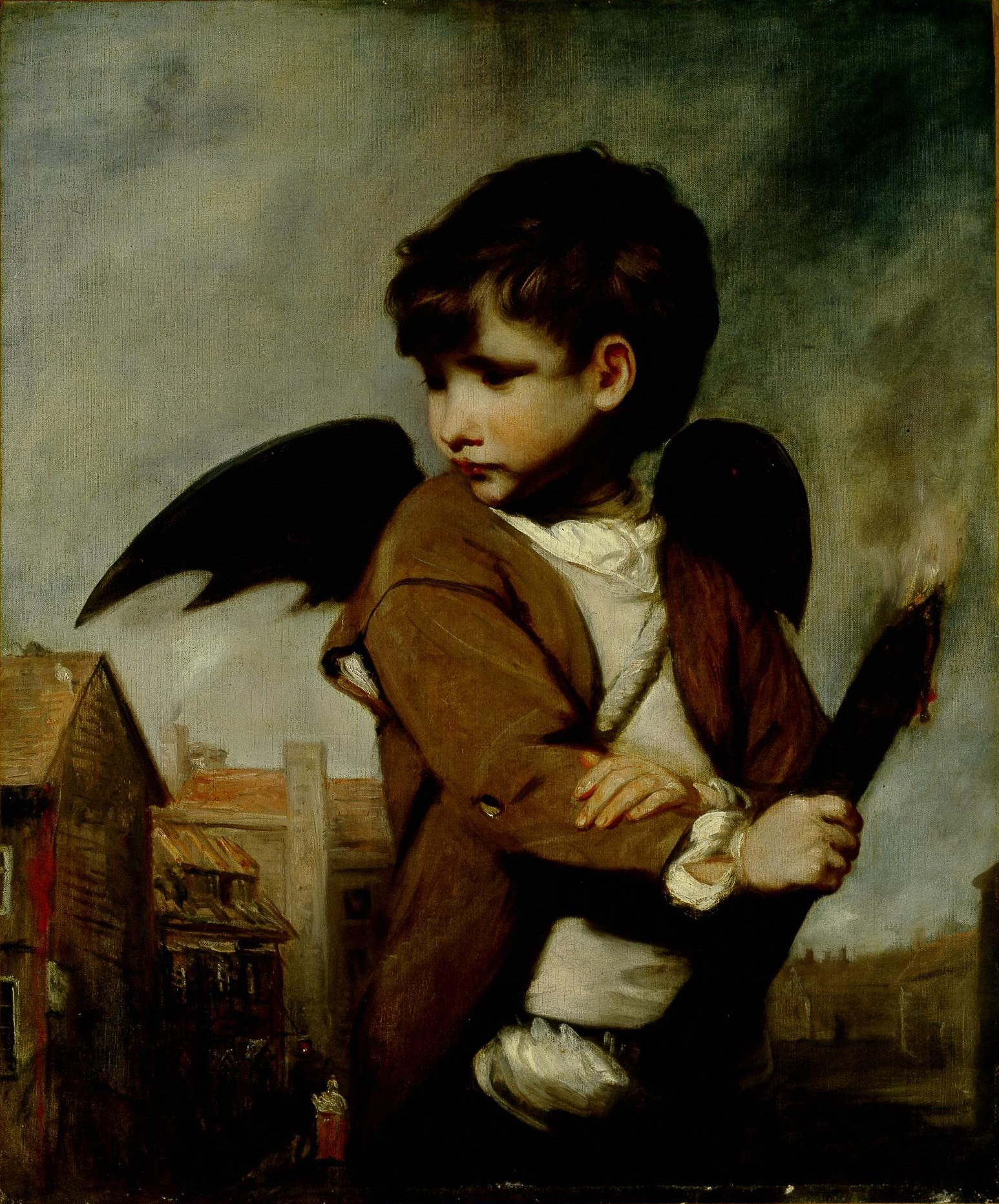
Joshua Reynolds Cupid as Link Boy, c. 1771-1777

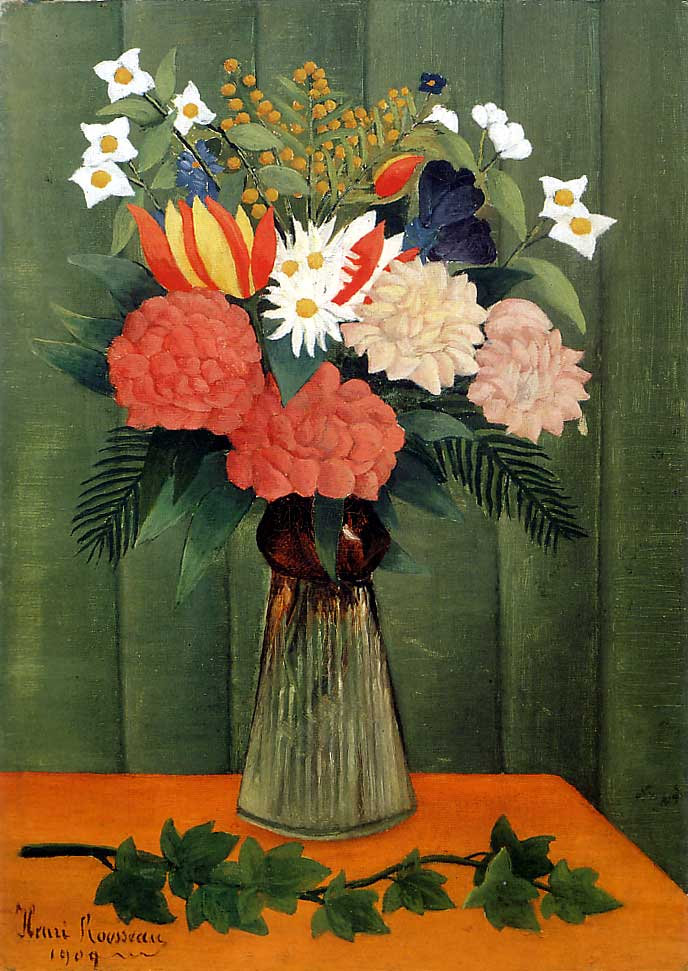
Henri Rousseau, Bouquet of Flowers with an Ivy Branch, 1909

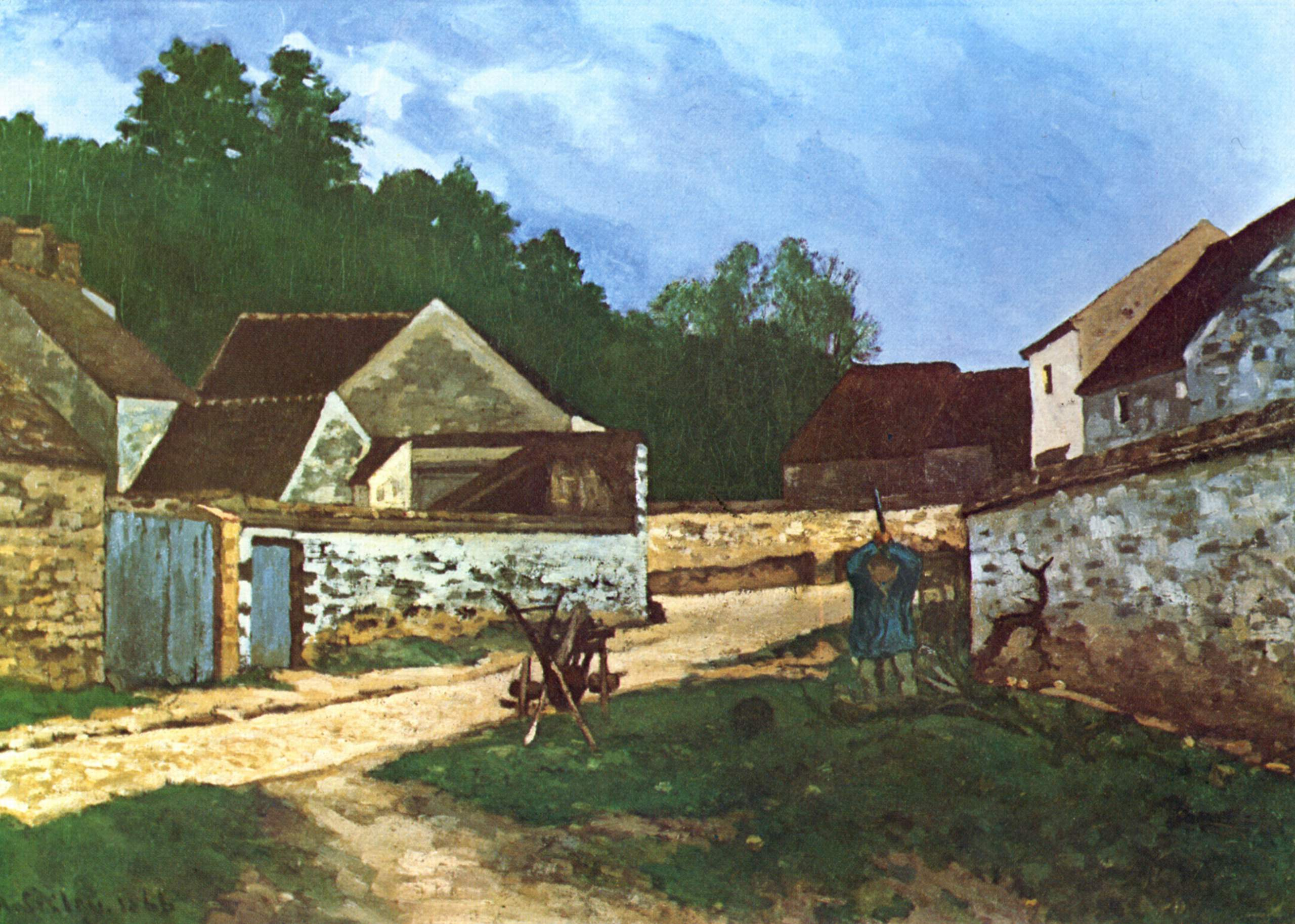
Alfred Sisley, Village Street in Marlotte, 1866

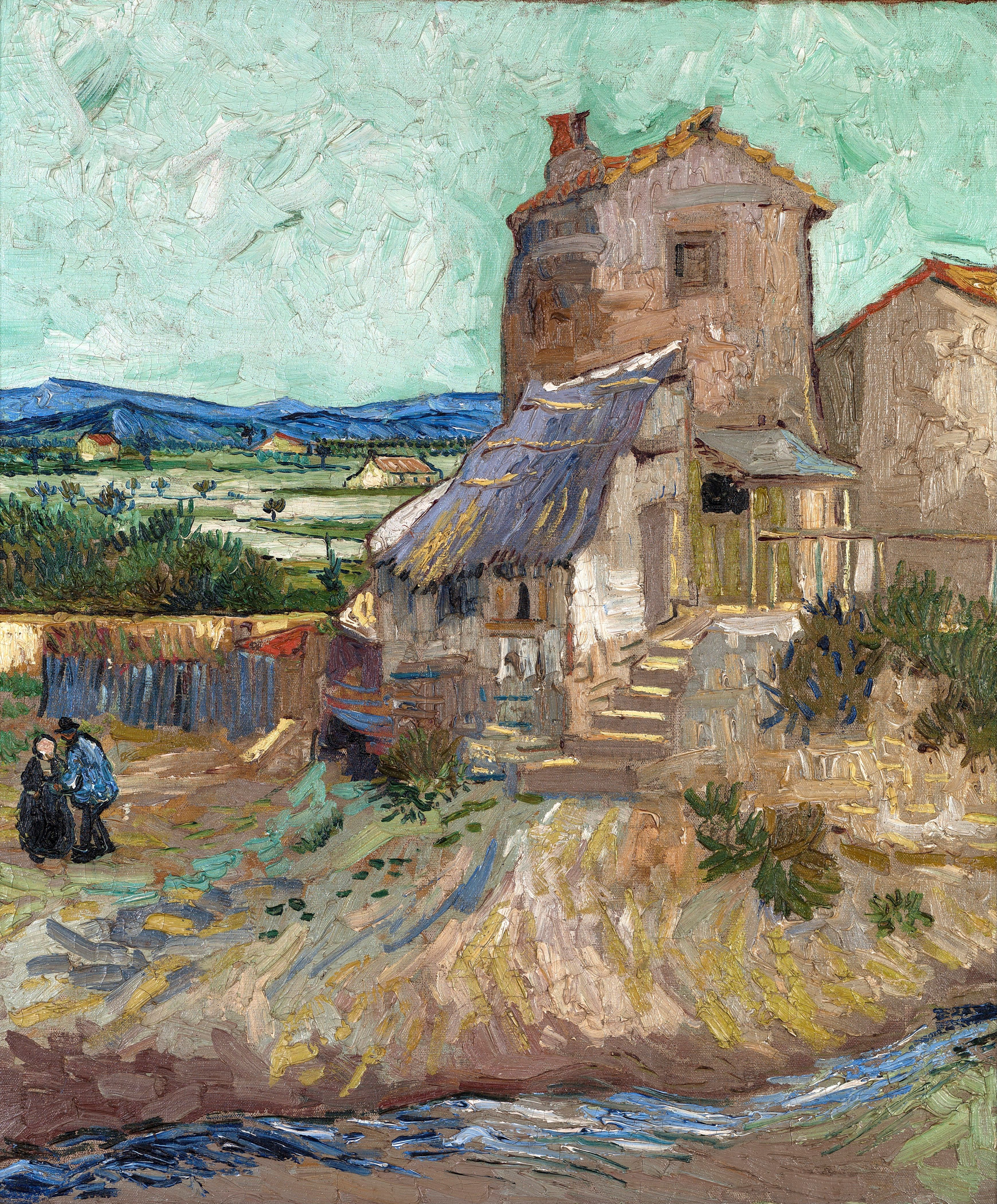
Vincent van Gogh, La Maison de la Crau (The Old Mill), 1888
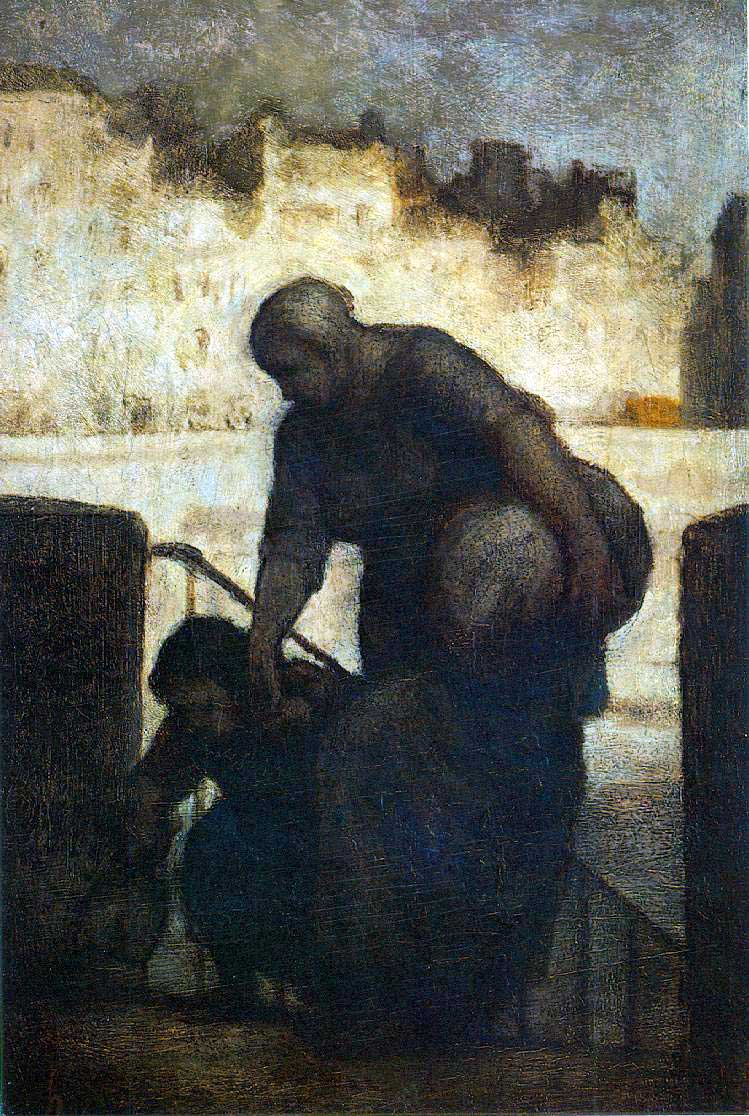
Honoré Daumier, Laundress on the Quai d'Anjou, c. 1860

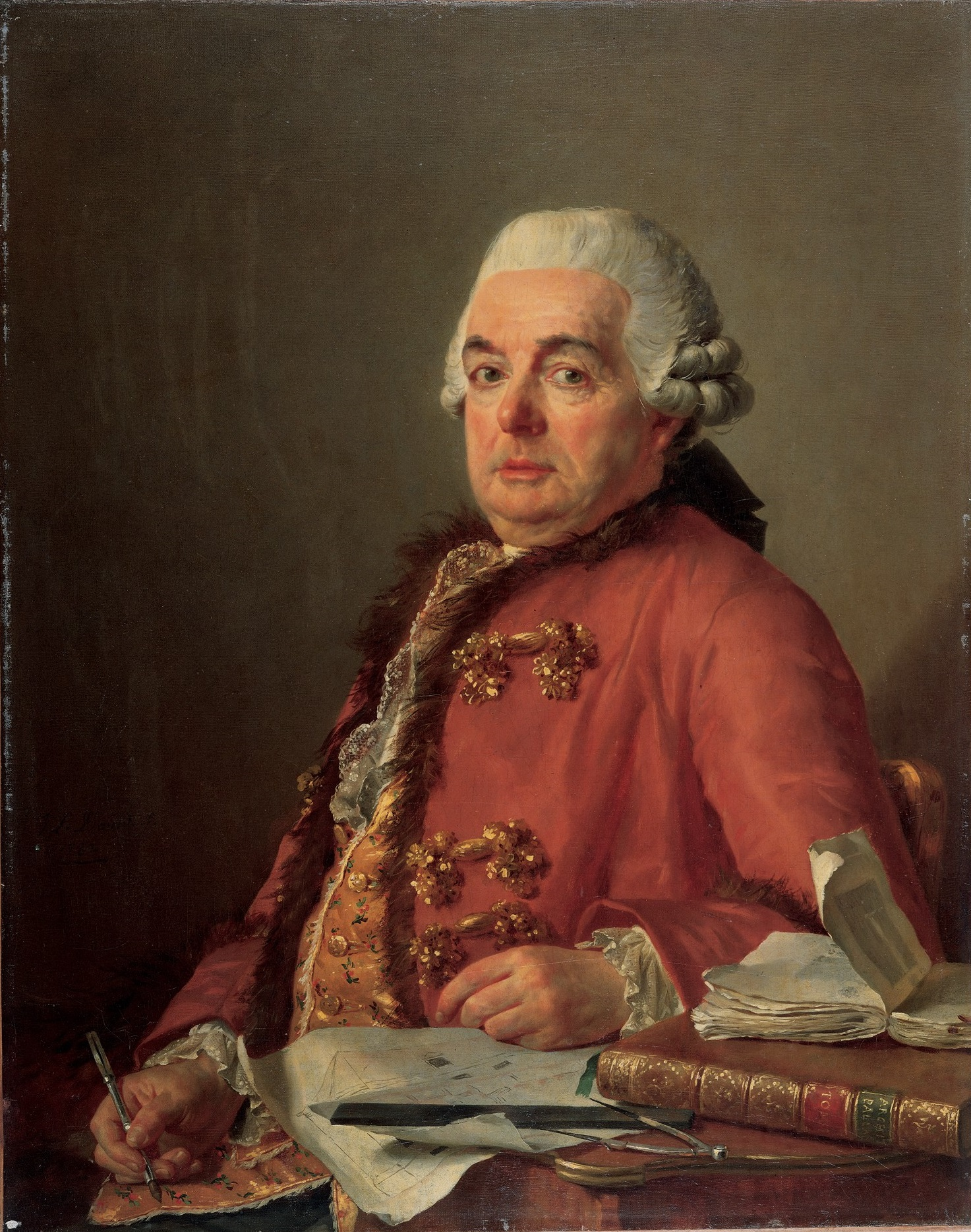
Jacques-Louis David, Portrait of Jacques-François Desmaisons, 1782

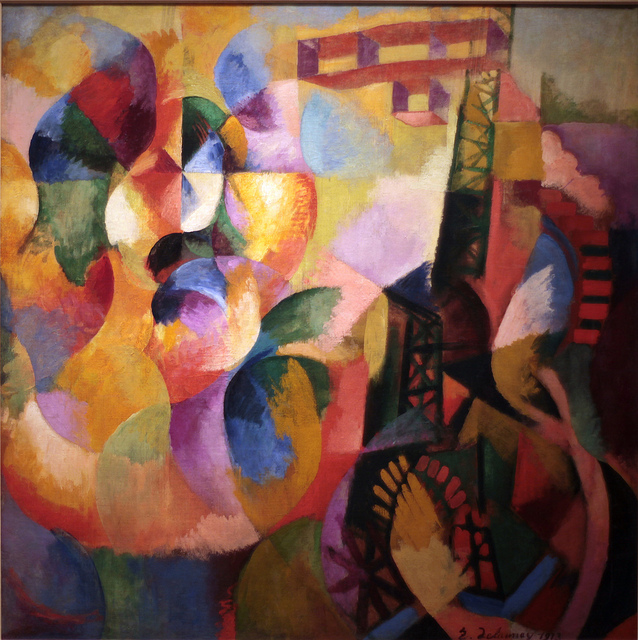
Robert Delaunay, Soleil, Tour, Aéroplane (Sun, Tower, Airplane), 1913

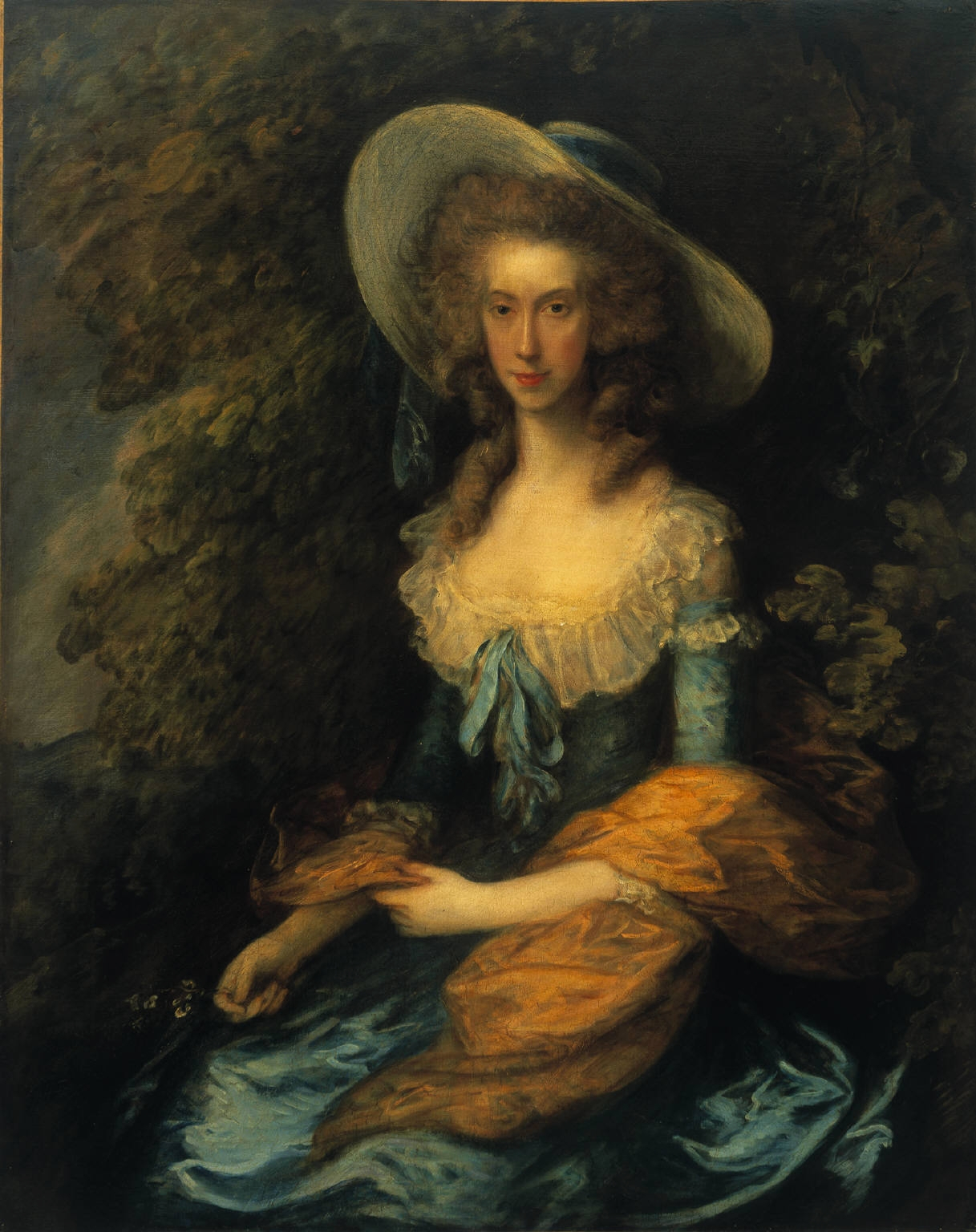
Thomas Gainsborough, Portrait of Miss Evans, c. 1786-1790

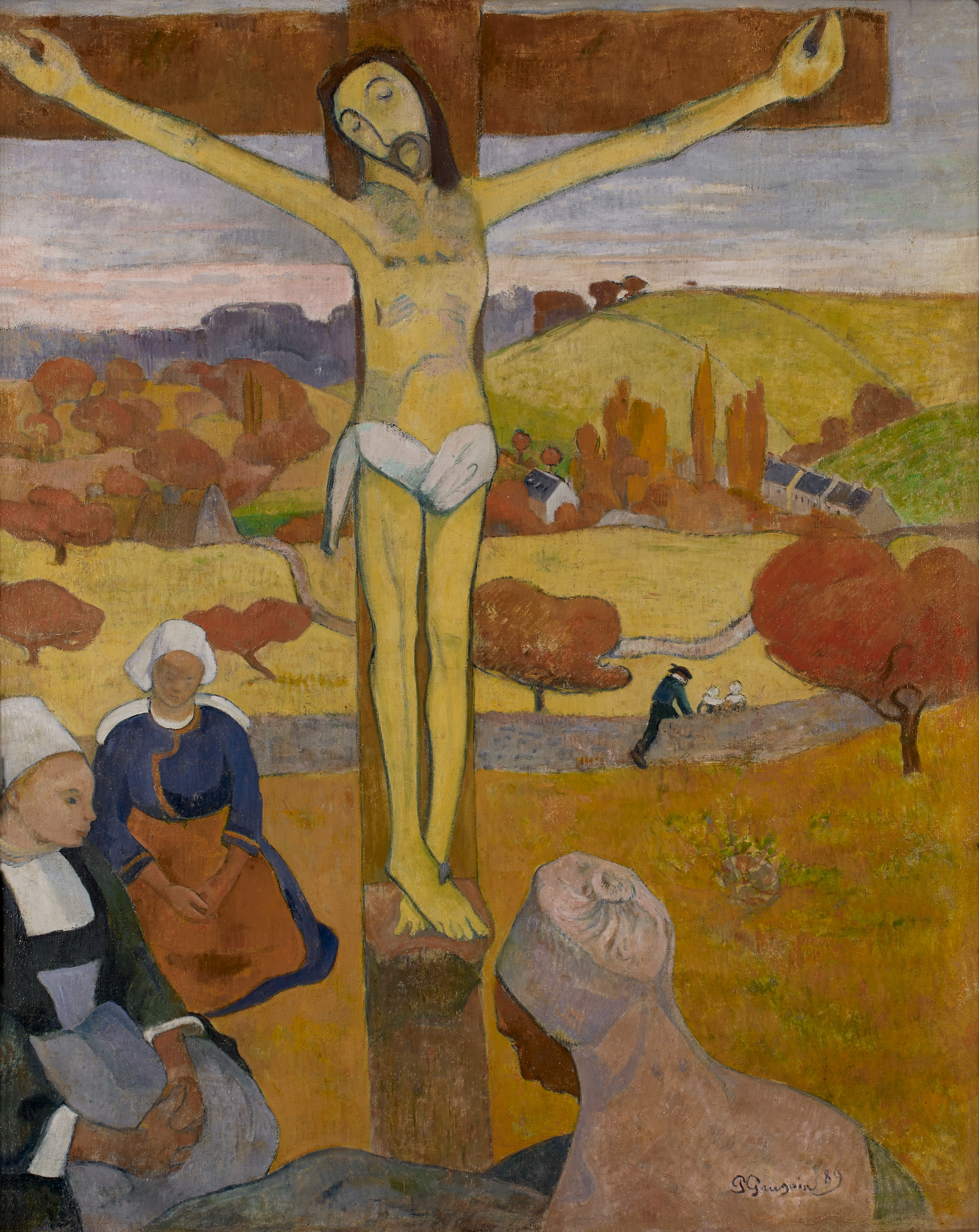
Paul Gauguin, The Yellow Christ, 1889

The Buffalo AKG Art Museum has more than 6,500 works in its collection, below is a list highlighting a few other notable works:

Name	Artist	Year	Notes
L'Homme qui marche I	Alberto Giacometti	1961	
Hotel Lobby	Max Beckmann	1950	
Music and Literature	William Michael Harnett	1878	
La Maison de la Crau (The Old Mill)	Vincent van Gogh	1888	
La Jeune bonne (The Servant Girl)	Amedeo Modigliani	1918	
Self-Portrait with Monkey	Frida Kahlo	1938	
Nude Figure	Pablo Picasso	1909-1910	
La Toilette	Pablo Picasso	1906	
Chemin de haulage à Argenteuil (Tow path at Argenteuil)	Claude Monet	1875	
Convergence	Jackson Pollock	1952	
Icarus	Richard Hunt	1956	
Orange and Yellow	Mark Rothko	1956	
Winter Light	Norman Carton	1956	
Cow	Andy Warhol	1976	

=== Sculptures ===
The gallery contains a variety of sculptures on the exterior grounds. Some of the most notable, from the past and the present, include:

Name	Artist	Year	Image
Alphabet Series	Fletcher Benton	N/A	
Big Red	James Rosati	1971	
Bond	Alexander Liberman	1969	
Stainless Steel, Aluminum, Monochrome I, Built to Live Anywhere, at Home Here	Nancy Rubins	2011	
Cigarette	Tony Smith	1961	
Diamond I of III	Antoni Milkowski	1967	
Directional I	Lyman Kipp	1962	
Karma	Do-Ho Suh	2010	
E.C. Column	Kenneth Snelson	1969–81	
Flat Rate II	Lyman Kipp	1969	
Four Chances	Kenneth Snelson	1982	
Into the Blue	Shayne Dark	2005	
Laura	Jaume Plensa	2012	
Look and See	Jim Hodges	2005	
Shark Girl	Casey Riordan Millard	2014	
Stacked Revision Structure	Liam Gillick	2005	
The Cry	Isamu Noguchi	1962	
Turning the World Upside Down #4	Anish Kapoor	1998	

== Deaccessioning and the museum's mission ==
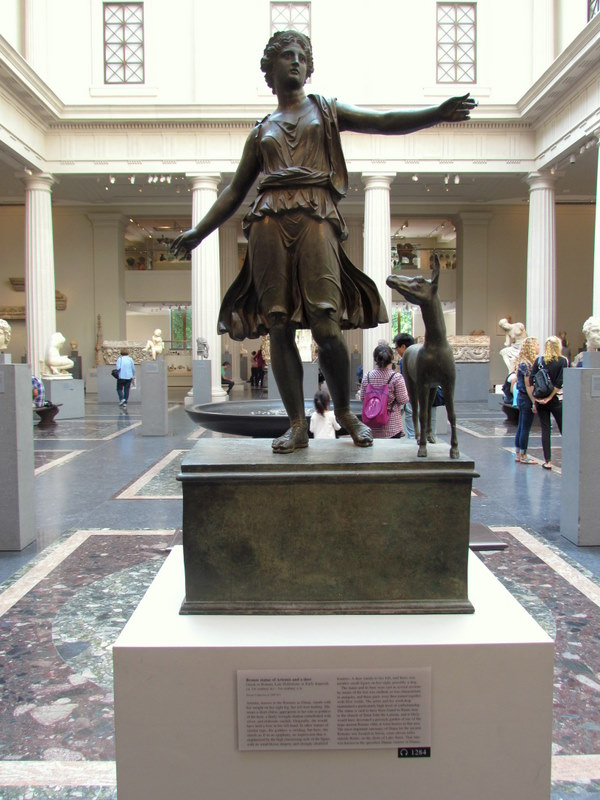
Artemis and the Stag, on display at the Metropolitan Museum of Art

In 2007, the Albright–Knox Art Gallery sold a Roman-era bronze sculpture, Artemis and the Stag, that was auctioned at Sotheby's New York on June 7, 2007, and brought $28.6 million. This was the highest price ever paid at auction for an antiquity or a sculpture of any period, according to Sotheby's. It was purchased by the London dealer Giuseppe Eskenazi on behalf of a private European collector.

The event brought national attention to what until then had been a local question, the mission of the Albright-Knox. In February 2007, when the list of works to be deaccessioned was made public, Albright-Knox Director Louis Grachos defined the ancient sculpture as falling outside the institution's historical "core mission" of "acquiring and exhibiting art of the present." This definition made public critics wonder whether the position at the Gallery of "William Hogarth's Lady's Last Stake or Sir Joshua Reynolds' Cupid as a Link Boy were secure. Works by Gustave Courbet, Honoré Daumier, Jacques-Louis David, and Eugène Delacroix had been purchased by the museum in earlier decades.

The decision to deaccession certain art works was made by a vote of the museum's board of directors, was voted on and ratified by the entire membership, and followed the guidelines of the American Alliance of Museums. The sale raised questions about how museums can remain vital when they are situated in economically declining regions and have limited means for raising funds for operations and acquisitions.

== Hours ==
The museum is open from 10 am to 8 pm, Thursday and Friday, and 10 am to 5 pm, Saturday through Monday. On the first Friday of each month, admission to the museum is Pay What You Wish sponsored by M&T Bank.

== Management ==
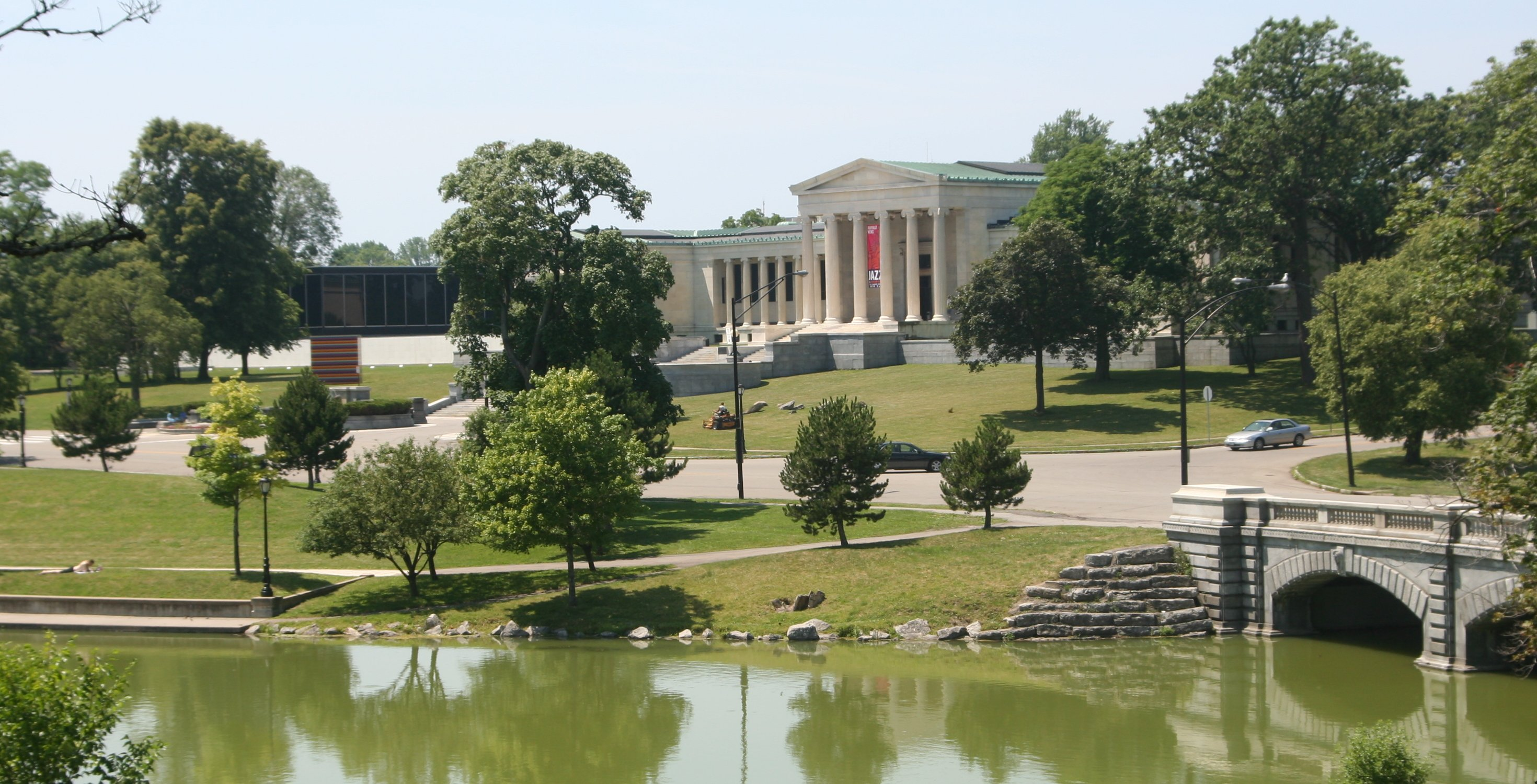
View of Albright–Knox Art Gallery from Delaware Park

=== Governance ===
Since 2013, Janne Sirén has been director of the Albright–Knox Art Gallery. Sirén is believed to be the first director from the Nordic region to take the helm of a major American art museum.

Complete list of directors:

- Janne Gallen-Kallela-Sirén (2013–present)
- Louis Grachos (2002–2013)
- Douglas G. Schultz (1983–2002)
- Robert T. Buck, Jr. (1973–1983)
- Gordon M. Smith (1955–1973)
- Edgar C. Schenck (1949–1955)
- Andrew C. Ritchie (1942–1949)
- Gordon B. Washburn (1931–1942)
- William M. Hekking (1925–1931)
- Cornelia Bentley Sage Quinton (1910–1924)
- Charles McMeen Kurtz (1905–1909)

=== Funding ===
As of 2007, the Albright–Knox Art Gallery's endowment stood at about $58 million, generating about $1.1 million a year for acquisitions. Since the proceeds from the sale of some 200 works of art in 2007 were added to the preexisting $22 million acquisitions endowment, the museum has been able to spend as much as almost $5 million on new art annually. In 2013, the Albright–Knox Art Gallery received an $11 million bequest from the estate of longtime board member and Buffalo arts patron Peggy Pierce Elfvin, the largest single gift in the museum's history at that time. In 2016, Los Angeles financier Jeffrey Gundlach contributed $42.5 million, the largest donation from a single individual in the museum's history.

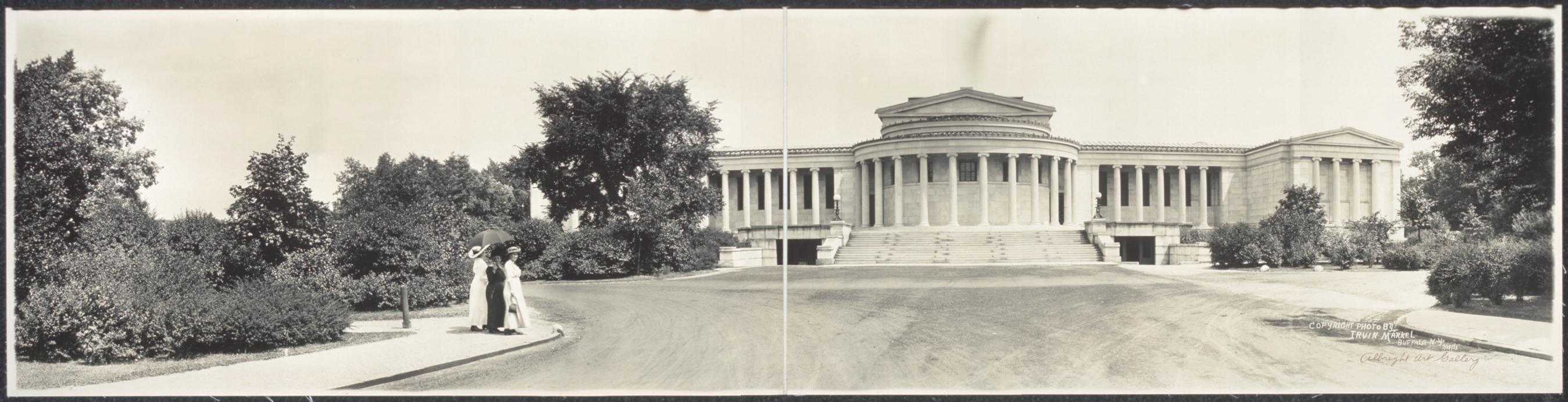
Albright Art Gallery in 1913

== See also ==
- John J. Albright
- Portrait of Seymour H. Knox
- Seymour H. Knox II
