= Cornelia Bentley Sage Quinton =

American painter (1876–1936)

- Born: Cornelia Bentley Sage; October 3, 1876; Buffalo, New York
- Died: May 16, 1936 (aged 59); Santa Barbara, California
- Known for: Painting, Arts Administration
- Spouse: William Warren Quinton (m. 1917)

Cornelia Bentley Sage Quinton (October 3, 1876 – May 16, 1936) was an American painter and curator. She was the director of the Albright Art Museum (later the Albright-Knox Art Gallery and the Buffalo AKG Art Museum) in Buffalo, New York, from 1910 through 1924. Upon her appointment as director on October 15, 1910, she became the first woman to serve as director of a major art museum in the United States.

== Life ==
Sage was born on October 3, 1876, in Buffalo, New York. She attended the Art Students League in both Buffalo and New York City, and the École du Louvre in Paris, France. Sage married William Warren Quinton on Oct 31, 1917.

Quinton began working at the Albright Art Museum in May 1905. She became director of the museum in 1910 after the sudden death of Charles M. Kurtz. Quinton organized noteworthy exhibitions at Albright Art Museum such as the International Exhibition of Pictorial Photography in 1910, and the Exhibition of Contemporary American Sculpture in 1916.

The International Exhibition of Pictorial Photography was the first photography exhibition held at an American museum. The Exhibition of Contemporary American Sculpture featured more than 800 works of sculpture by 168 contemporary American artists.

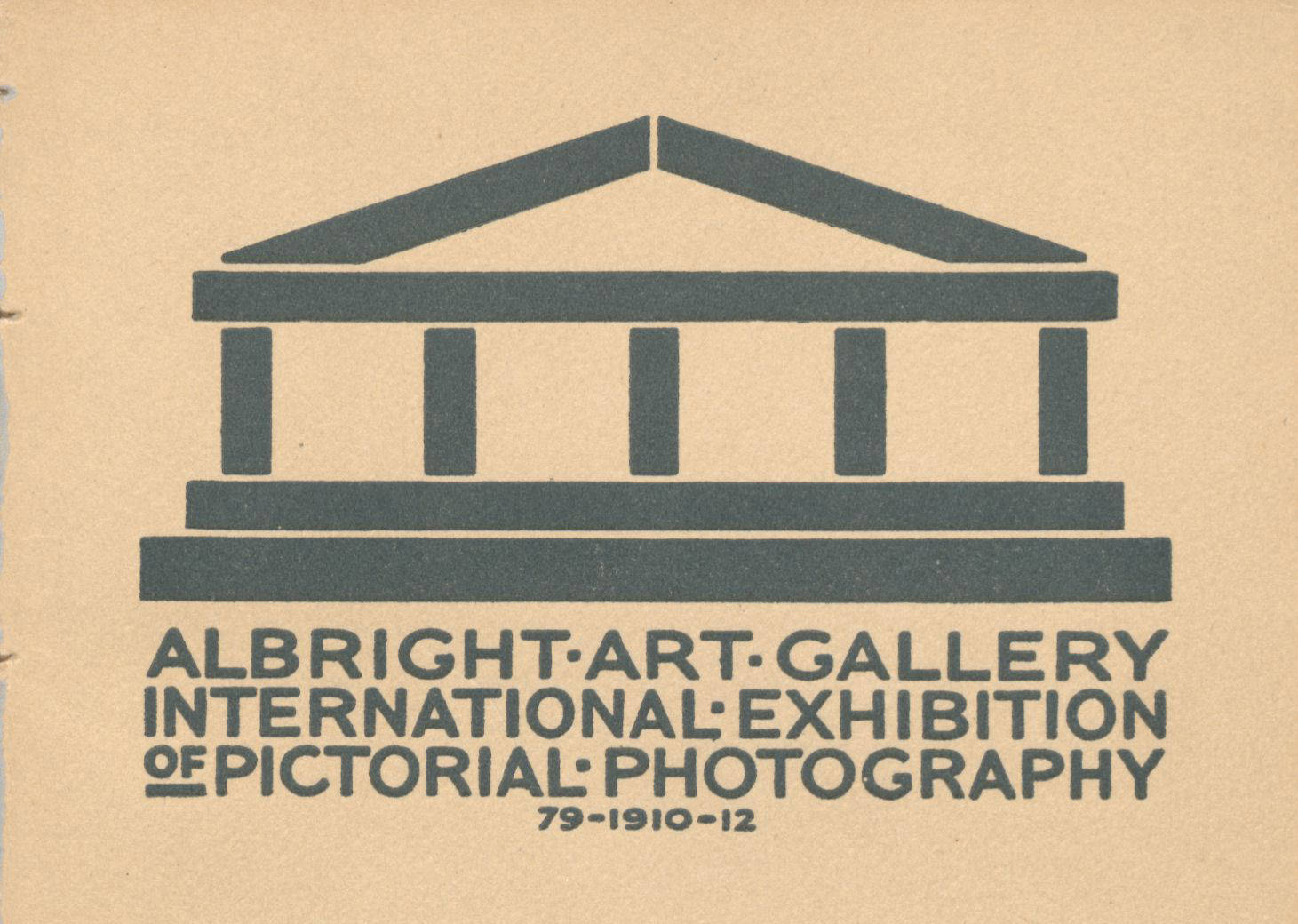
Catalogue of the international exhibition, pictorial photography

In 1920 Quinton received Cross of the Legion of Honor from France for her work promoting French art during WWI.

Quinton left the Albright Art Museum in 1924 to become the director of California Palace of the Legion of Honor, a position she held until 1930.

Quinton died on May 16, 1936, in Santa Barbara, California.

== Legacy ==
In 2002 Quinton was honored by the WNY Friends of the National Women's Hall of Fame. In 2025, the Buffalo AKG Art Museum profiled Quinton with the exhibition, 'Cornelia Bentley Sage Quinton: “For the Glory of Buffalo!”.'
