= Halsey Ives =

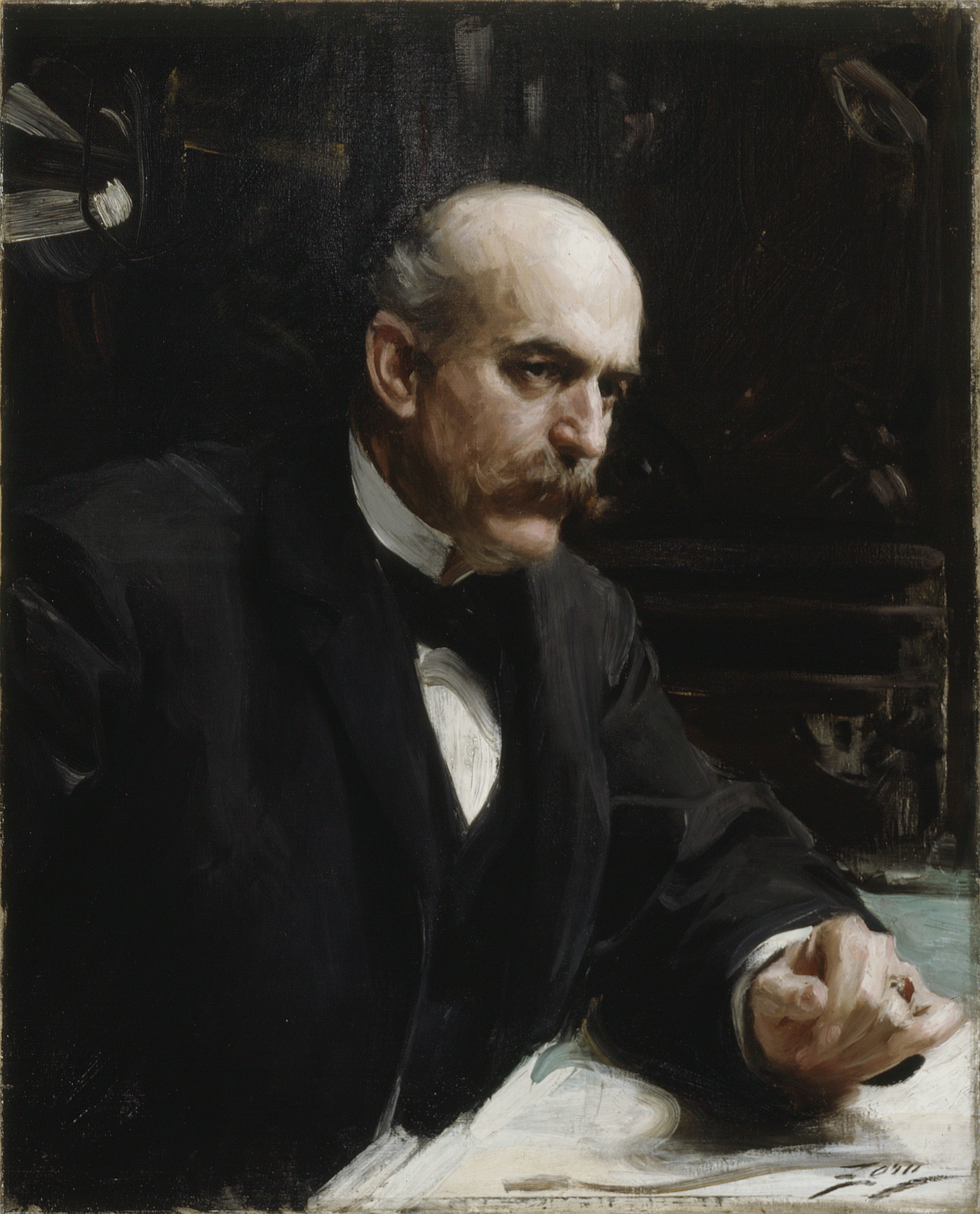
- Halsey Cooley Ives (1894-94), by Anders Zorn. Oil on canvas, Saint Louis Art Museum
- Born: October 27, 1847; Montour Falls, New York, U.S.
- Died: May 5, 1911 (aged 63); London, England
- Known for: Founder of the Saint Louis School and Museum of Fine Arts

Halsey Cooley Ives (27 October 1847 – 5 May 1911) was the founding director of the Saint Louis School and Museum of Fine Arts. Ives was also a landscape painter, but is best remembered for the organization, administration, and popularization of art in St. Louis, Missouri.

== Biography ==
Ives was born in Montour Falls, New York, then called Havana, to Hiram DuBoise Ives and Teresa (née McDowell) Ives. He studied in the School of Art at South Kensington in England, and took courses at other art schools. During the Civil War he was employed as a draftsman by the United States Government, a job which sent him to Nashville, Tennessee. After the war, he traveled throughout the country and into Mexico, working as a designer and decorator. He settled in Saint Louis, to become part of the faculty at Washington University in St. Louis.

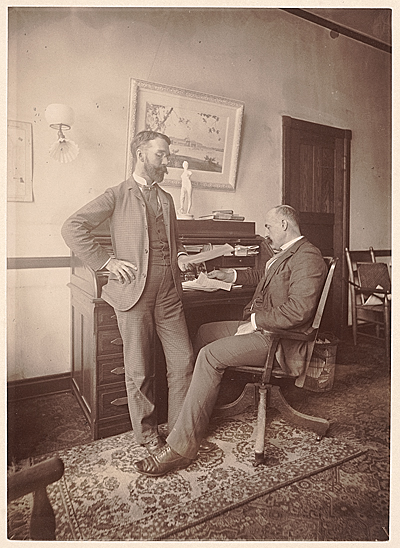
Ives and Charles M. Kurtz, c. 1893

In 1874 Ives started a free evening drawing class. This was the beginning of the Saint Louis School and Museum of Fine Arts, formally inaugurated in 1879. The museum and school formed the art department at Washington University. His work drew the attention of influential and powerful people in the city. Through the financial support of Wayman Crow a new building for the museum was completed on what is now Locust street in 1881. Ives was called to Chicago in 1892 to organize and conduct the art department of the World's Columbian Exposition, or the Chicago World's Fair as it is often called, that was to take place the following year. He was selected because of his famous broad-mindedness, his interest in the equal representation of all forms of art.

In 1894 Ives was appointed by the National Bureau of Education to examine and report upon courses of instruction and methods of work in foreign art museums and schools. He began in Giza and traveled all over the old world, tracing the development of art throughout history and its relation to the rise of civilization.

Through the efforts of Ives in the 1890s, then a member of the city council, an ordinance was passed authorizing the erection of an art building in Forest Park. There was, however, no funding for such a structure. It was not until the Louisiana Purchase Exposition, or St. Louis World's Fair, that such a plan could become a reality. Ives was chosen to be the Chief of the Department of Art at the exposition. This would be his sixth participation in such an exhibition. He had the same assistant-chief that he had worked with during Chicago's Expo, and they worked to surpass this previous fair, and also the Paris Exposition Universelle (1900) in every way that they were able.

At the close of the Exposition, the structure that had housed the art show of the fair, was presented to the city of St. Louis as the permanent home of the art collection Ives ran. Ives introduced a bill into the General Assembly for an art tax to support the maintenance of the museum. The bill was approved by the citizens of St. Louis by a nearly 4-to-1 margin. However, the city's controller refused to distribute the tax to the museum's board of control, as it was not a municipal entity and so had no right to funds from taxes. The controller's position was upheld in 1908 by the Missouri Supreme Court. This caused the formal separation of the museum from the university in 1909. As a result, the museum became a public entity. The university agreed to lend its collection and Halsey Ives to continue to direct it. The institution was renamed the City Art Museum.

Art should be a matter of every-day enjoyment and use to every normally-constituted man, woman, and child.

— Halsey Cooley Ives, Stevens, Walter B. (ed.) 1915, Halsey Cooley Ives, LL.D. 1847-1911; Founder of the St. Louis School of Fine Arts; First Director of the City Art Museum of St. Louis, Ives Memorial Society, Saint Louis, MO

He died in London in 1911.

The Saint Louis Art Museum retains the personal papers of Halsey Ives.
