= Studio Other Spaces =

Berlin art studio

Studio Other Spaces (SOS) was founded by artist Olafur Eliasson and architect Sebastian Behmann in Berlin in 2014. The studio works on interdisciplinary and experimental building projects and artworks for public space. Eliasson and Behmann's partnership offers a platform for art and architecture to intersect and enrich each other.

Studio Other Spaces' research includes historical, ecological, social, and emotional parameters of a particular site and its users. Their work connects craftsmanship with material innovation and new technologies.

== History ==
Studio Other Spaces emerged from the long-term creative collaboration of Icelandic-Danish artist Olafur Eliasson (b. 1967) and German architect Sebastian Behmann (b. 1969) at Studio Olafur Eliasson, which reaches back to 2001. As the studio's Head of Design, Behmann has worked with Eliasson to create and install several artworks such as ‘The weather project’, 2003, which has been described as "a milestone in contemporary art", in the Turbine Hall of Tate Modern, London. Together, the two have worked on numerous architectural projects, including various pavilions; ‘Your rainbow panorama’ (2011) for the ARoS Aarhus Kunstmuseum, Denmark; the façade design of Harpa – Reykjavik Concert Hall and Conference Centre, developed by Studio Olafur Eliasson in collaboration with Henning Larsen Architects; ‘Cirkelbroen (The circle bridge)’ in Copenhagen, 2015; and ‘Fjordenhus (Fjord house)’ in Vejle, Denmark (2009–2018).

=== Recent projects ===
- Common Sky (2019–22), a contribution to the reinvention of the Albright-Knox Art Gallery in Buffalo, New York, US.
- Vertical Panorama Pavilion (2020–2022) in Sonoma, California, US. The pavilion's defining feature is a conical canopy, 14.5m in diameter and comprising 832 colourful glass tiles that tell the story of the local weather.
- The Seeing City (2015–2022) a permanent work of art for the 15th and 16th floor of the Morland Mixité Capitale building in Paris, France. Awards: Réinventer Paris: first prize; Grands Prix SIMI 2022: Catégorie Immeuble mixte.; RIBA International Awards for Excellence 2024.
- Meles Zenawi Memorial Park (2013–23) in Addis Ababa, Ethiopia, a campus comprising five buildings, several pavilions, and a park, conceived and built with Ethiopian partners and in collaboration with Vogt Landscape Architects.
- Lyst Restaurant (2019) inside Fjordenhus, Vejle, Denmark. In interdisciplinary workshops with the restaurant's kitchen team, SOS developed a furnishing design concept that creates a direct transfer between the art of cooking and design.

=== Exhibitions ===
- The studio's first solo exhibition, titled ‘The Design of Collaboration’, was on display at Kunst Meran Merano Arte in South Tyrol, Italy, from September 2020 through January 2021.
- As part of curator Hashim Sarkis’s exhibition in the Central Pavilion for Biennale Architettura 2021, SOS collaborated with six co-designers to present ‘Future Assembly’, a more-than-human gathering inspired by the United Nations. Future Assembly responds to the UN's call to protect the environment.
- ‘Räumliche Solidaritäten’ (Spatial Solidarities) was on display at Das Gelbe Haus Flims in Switzerland from 8 October 2023 through 27 October 2024. The exhibition presented a selection of SOS projects alongside local initiatives from Flims and the surrounding area, addressing agricultural, social, and infrastructural themes.

=== Publications ===
- In 2025, the architecture magazine 2G dedicated issue 93 to Studio Other Spaces, under the title 2G 93: Studio Other Spaces. Olafur Eliasson, Sebastian Behmann.
