= Studio Olafur Eliasson =

German design studio

Studio Olafur Eliasson was founded in 1995 by Danish-Icelandic artist Olafur Eliasson. Based in Berlin, the studio's team comprises craftspeople and specialised technicians, architects, archivists and art historians, web and graphic designers, filmmakers, cooks, and administrators. As of 2014, the studio employed approximately 90 people. Working closely with the artist, the studio team engages in experiments; develops, designs, and produces artworks, exhibitions, and architectural projects; and communicates and contextualises Eliasson's work. Further architectural projects include the Serpentine Gallery Pavilion 2007, London, with Kjetil Thorsen; Your rainbow panorama, for ARoS Aarhus Kunstmuseum, 2011; and the Harpa concert hall & conference center in Reykjavík, Iceland, for which Studio Olafur Eliasson, together with Henning Larsen Architects and Batteríid architects, received the Mies van der Rohe Award 2013. In 2014, Eliasson co-founded Studio Other Spaces, an affiliated office for art and architecture, with German architect Sebastian Behmann. The office focuses on interdisciplinary and experimental building projects and artworks for public space.

== Institut für Raumexperimente ==
The Institut für Raumexperimente (Institute for Spatial Experiments) was a five-year educational research project initiated by Olafur Eliasson, affiliated with the College of Fine Arts at the Berlin University of the Arts (UdK), which ran from 2009 to 2014. It was co-directed by Olafur Eliasson, Eric Ellingsen, and Christina Werner. The institute was housed within the studio building, and played an integral part within the dynamic of the studio's creative activities:

"The practice I have developed makes me believe in my works and studio as agents in the world. And just as my works and studio participate in a continual exchange with their environment, with the times in which they exist, so too does the school." - Olafur Eliasson.

The programme of the Institut für Raumexperimente — including lectures, workshops and experiments — was part of the curriculum of the professor's class. A full archive of past events is available on the website. Since 2015, the Institut für Raumexperimente e.V., a non-profit registered association, has maintained the institute's online archive and continues to develop projects with select partners.

== Take Your Time publication series ==
An in-house production, TYT (Take Your Time) presents current research and projects by Olafur Eliasson and the studio in the format of an intermittently recurring magazine, with an emphasis on the process of developing and testing ideas and artworks. First published in 2007, the series has expanded to at least seven volumes as of 2017:

- Studio Olafur Eliasson, eds., TYT (Take Your Time) Vol. 1: Small Spatial Experiments, Berlin: Studio Olafur Eliasson, 2007.
- Studio Olafur Eliasson, eds., TYT (Take Your Time) Vol. 2: Printed Matter, Berlin: Studio Olafur Eliasson; Köln: Verlag der Buchhandlung Walther König, 2009.
- Studio Olafur Eliasson, eds., TYT (Take Your Time) Vol. 3: Driftwood, Berlin: Studio Olafur Eliasson, 2010.
- Studio Olafur Eliasson, eds., TYT (Take Your Time) Vol. 4: Writings 2001–2012, Berlin: Studio Olafur Eliasson, 2012.
- Studio Olafur Eliasson, eds., TYT (Take Your Time) Vol. 5: The Kitchen, Berlin: Studio Olafur Eliasson, 2013.
- Studio Olafur Eliasson, eds., TYT (Take Your Time) Vol. 6: Institut für Raumexperimente, 2009–2014; How to Make the Best Art School in the World, Berlin: Studio Olafur Eliasson, 2014.
- Studio Olafur Eliasson, eds., TYT (Take Your Time) Vol. 7: Open House, Berlin: Studio Olafur Eliasson, 2017.

== Life is Space ==
Almost annually since 2006, Studio Olafur Eliasson has hosted a get-together called Life is Space (formerly Life in Space). Loosely scheduled as a day-long event largely left to intuition and chance, Life is Space brings together scientists, artists, scholars, dancers, theorists, spatial practitioners, and movement experts, together with the Institut für Raumexperimente participants and the studio team to share, discuss, present, and experiment.

Although typically hosted within Studio Olafur Eliasson Berlin, iterations of Life is Space have occurred in conjunction with exhibitions by Olafur Eliasson and affiliated institutions. In 2008, in conjunction with Take your time, the first comprehensive survey of Olafur Eliasson's work at MoMA, a symposium entitled The Colors of the Brain took place that brought together a number of experts within the fields of neuroscience, philosophy, and art to review and critique contemporary cultural theories of color that have emerged from artistic and scientific practices. The symposium was divided over three days. Each day was hosted at a different location (MoMA, Columbia University Graduate School of Architecture, Planning and Preservation, and Studio Olafur Eliasson respectively), culminating in the third iteration of Life is Space at Studio Olafur Eliasson, Berlin.

A number of subsequent publications and videos have resulted from the various iterations of Life is Space, which can be viewed on the Studio Olafur Eliasson website.
