= Charles M. Kurtz =

American art historian

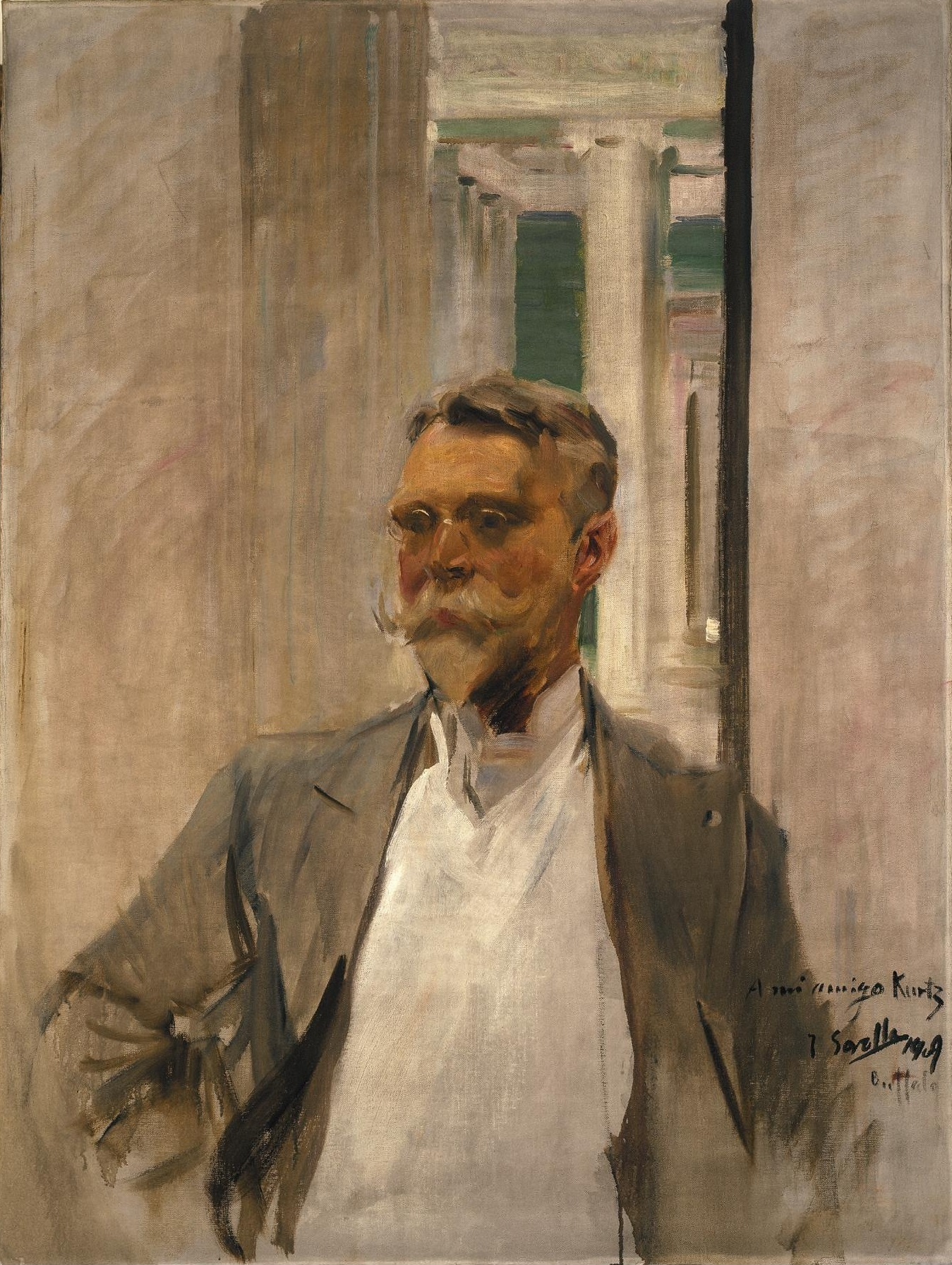
- Portrait of Kurtz by Joaquín Sorolla, 1909
- Born: March 20, 1855; New Castle, Pennsylvania
- Died: March 21, 1909 (aged 54); Buffalo, New York
- Education: Washington & Jefferson College
- Occupations: curator, art critic, writer
- Spouse: Julia Stephenson (m. 1885)

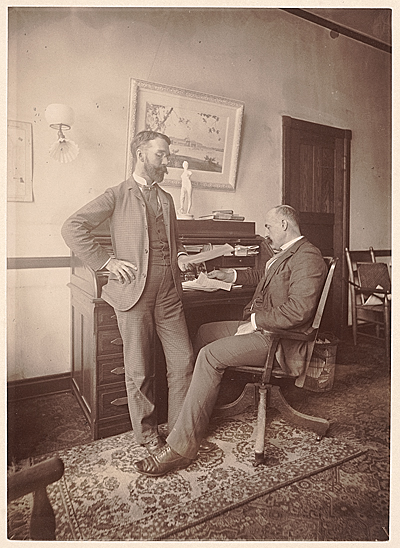
Kurtz with Halsey Ives, c. 1893

Charles McMeen Kurtz (March 20, 1855 – March 21, 1909) was an American art critic, writer, and museum curator.

== Biography ==
He was born in New Castle, Pennsylvania on March 20, 1855, to Davis Brook Kurtz and Julia Wilder. The family's ancestry was traceable to Darmstadt, Germany. He and his 4 siblings grew up in Lawrence County, Pennsylvania.

He graduated from Washington & Jefferson College in 1876. He then studied at the National Academy of Design in New York City, later earning an M.A. from Washington & Jefferson in 1878.

In 1881 he published the first edition of the National Academy Notes. He married Julia Stephenson in 1885, and they had three daughters.

In 1891 he was appointed as one of Halsey Ives's assistants in the Fine Arts Department of the World's Columbian Exposition, where he introduced American art audiences to Glasgow School, the Danish School, Mihály Munkácsy, Joaquim Sorolla. He also worked as the Assistant Director of Fine Arts for the United States for the Paris Exposition of 1900. He was the art director for the Louisiana Purchase Exposition in 1904.

He was known for being an outspoken opponent of tariffs on imported art.

He died in Buffalo, New York on March 21, 1909.

His papers are on file at the Smithsonian Archives of American Art.
