= -core =

Suffix used for aesthetics

The suffix -core is used for various visual styles and trends. The term later became associated with internet slang. Originating from the hardcore punk genre, the term gained broader prominence during the late 2000s to early 2010s to describe various internet aesthetics.

== Etymology ==
The suffix -core may be applied to any word to describe a trend or aesthetic associated with the word. Terms coined with the suffix often refer to subcultures that already exist. The use of -core is associated with niche internet aesthetics, which gained popularity alongside the suffix. Terms with the suffix are used to conceptualize trends in a way that can be easily communicated. It is mostly used by Generation Z. -core and similar suffixes, such as -ussy and -pilled, are used online and on TikTok for shorthand references to concepts. The term -punk, originally used in cyberpunk and steampunk later gained popularity amidst the emergence of seapunk. Alongside, -wave originally taken from new wave, and later repurposed for chillwave and vaporwave. The term sleaze (as in indie sleaze) arose in response to -core to refer to subversions of trends. The suffix -core has been described as the successor to the term chic to refer to visual styles and fashion trends.

== History ==
=== Origins (1980s–1990s) ===
The word core initially referred to a central element of a thing. The term hard-core initially referred to a devoted follower of a movement before being applied to the genre of hardcore punk music in the 1980s, with the earliest recorded use of the term "hardcore punk rock" being made in January 1980 by the Canadian punk band D.O.A. in an issue of San Francisco punk fanzine "Creep", the band would later release their album Hardcore '81 considered one of the first times that a punk record was labeled hardcore.

By the mid-1980s, the suffix -core was applied to various subgenres influenced by hardcore punk, such as nardcore, thrashcore and grindcore. Later being used for alternative and punk rock music styles and scenes such as queercore, sasscore and slowcore. By the late 1990s to early 2000s, the term was used in hip-hop subgenres like horrorcore and nerdcore, as well as other musical styles such as darkcore, doomcore, metalcore, deathcore and ramones-core.

Some of these genres inspired the ironic usage of the suffix which gained popularity in the early 2010s to refer to online aesthetics, internet microgenres, fashion trends and visual styles.

=== Proliferation (2000s–2020s) ===
The first use of the suffix -core to refer to a style was the term "fashioncore" coined by metalcore band Eighteen Visions in 2002, which later helped originate the visual style, fashion and aesthetic of the scene subculture. This was followed by, normcore, coined in 2013 by trend forecasting group K-HOLE. The normcore aesthetic involved plain clothing as people chose to avoid social media's focus on uniqueness. Glamcore arose soon after normcore as a trend in opposition to it. New York Magazine popularized the term normcore, as well as the 2017 term gorpcore, an outdoor recreation-themed aesthetic named after the snack gorp. The -core suffix began being applied to contemporary momentary trends and online visual aesthetics.

The cottagecore aesthetic emerged during the early COVID-19 pandemic as residents of cities wished to get more involved with nature. Similar escapism inspired the darker goblincore aesthetic. The COVID-19 pandemic also inspired cluttercore, which involved collecting objects indoors. The American Dialect Society considered -core as a nominee for "most creative word of 2021".

The term corecore emerged in response to the overuse of the associated suffix, originating in 2020 and later gaining wider popularity in 2022. Corecore became an artistic movement aiming to capture post-2020 sensibilities, commonly described as an "anti-trend", originated by users such as @masonoelle and @HighEnquiries. Corecore videos collaged clips from movies, memes, television shows, and online videos, juxtaposed with music that often involved themes of sadness and loneliness, as well as criticisms of consumerism. Many internet users viewed corecore as a unique art form, though some criticized the popularity of the trend for weakening its message that opposed trendiness.

Fashions suffixed with -core surged in popularity in 2022. Inspired by the 2023 movie Barbie, the suffix was applied to the Barbiecore trend, inspired by the style of the movie's titular character and the color pink. Barbiecore was more popular than other -core trends the same year. Lexicographer Grant Barrett told The New York Times that year, "'Core' just seems like a suffix that is going to last and last and last."

== Criticism ==
The popularity of core aesthetics have been described as a symptom of a broader identity crisis among Gen Z.

== Examples ==
A Fandom wiki called Aesthetics Wiki has documented over a thousand -core aesthetics. Over 5,000 genres with the suffix -core have been listed on Spotify. Notable uses of the suffix include:

- Balletcore – an aesthetic drew inspiration from the graceful and elegant aesthetic of ballet dancers
- Barbiecore – an aesthetic inspired by the movie Barbie featuring the color pink
- Bimbocore – an aesthetic associated with bimbo fashion style
- Cluttercore – a maximalist aesthetic
- Corecore – an Internet aesthetic and art movement
- Cottagecore – a pastoral aesthetic
- Goblincore – a grotesque, fantasy-inspired aesthetic
- Gorpcore – an aesthetic based on outdoor recreation
- Hopecore – an aesthetic based on hope and optimism
- Kidcore – a colorful aesthetic inspired by Y2K fashion
- Larpercore – an aesthetic and Discord subculture focused on militaristic personas associated with cyberbullying or violent extremism
- Normcore – an anti-fashion aesthetic focused on plain clothing
- Weirdcore – a surreal warped version of childhood nostalgia and early internet
- Webcore – early internet nostalgia-based aesthetic
- Older Brother Core – visual aesthetic pertaining to 1990s-to-2000s-era teenage boys
- Regencycore – an aesthetic inspired by the television series Bridgerton

== See also ==
- New Aesthetic
