= Corecore =

2020s Internet aesthetic and artistic movement

Corecore (alternatively spelled CoreCore) is an Internet aesthetic and artistic movement that developed on social media platforms, particularly TikTok, as a way of reflecting on digital culture and post-2020 sensibilities. It typically brings together different video clips to highlight the repetitive and overwhelming nature of online content. The trend draws attention for capturing a sense of information overload and the chaotic environment of contemporary internet culture, and is largely associated with Generation Z.

A product of youth culture, the corecore aesthetic was largely shared on TikTok and Instagram, originally juxtaposing various video clips with emotional music. The term "nichetok" has been described as a sister trend to corecore. Though technically different, the two terms are often used interchangeably by TikTok users. The terms chaos edit and 21st century humor are also related. The "hopecore" trend emerged as a positive stylistic offshoot of corecore.

== Aesthetic ==
Meant to evoke strong emotions, the corecore aesthetic juxtaposes imagery with its content made up of "seemingly unrelated clips" culled from a variety of sources including news footage, social media, films, livestreams, and memes. This content is then overlaid on usually emotionally rousing, somber, or ambient music. Rap music has been noted to accompany some corecore videos. The clips are edited at various speeds.

Writing on a corecore video, Moises Mendez II of Time noted it was "full of intentionally jarring juxtapositions and set to a kind of pensive sonic wall." Chance Townsend of Mashable wrote that "some [corecore videos] can be unintelligible meme dumps that are upbeat, bordering on dada-style collage art and other edits are just clips of cats and Fortnite mashed together," with the latter also referred to as #pinkcore. Townsend noted that "some of the most common signifiers of corecore edits included British football clips, Family Guy, Blade Runner 2049, any clip of Jake Gyllenhaal screaming, and melancholic music (usually a soft piano score or Aphex Twin)." The latter's "QKThr" track has been noted as a particularly repurposed for soundtracking corecore videos. Mendez II also notes the use of clips from American Psycho.

The themes in corecore videos are very wide in scope; Mendez II wrote "Some [videos] may focus on certain themes, such as the experience of being a woman in a sexist world, while others try to comment more broadly on the overwhelming, disconnected, random, oversaturated nature of being a human in the world today." The social commentary found in corecore is largely disseminated and consumed by Generation Z, with the youth addressing topics "like capitalism, greed, depression, social status, fear of climate change and relationships." Writing for The Guardian, Hannah Ewens described corecore videos as "depressing, full of existential dread and usually on the theme of disconnection and alienation," while also calling them "crudely edited."

Writing for Hyperallergic, Isabella Segalovich noted that "Joe Rogan, Jordan Peterson, and Theo Von make frequent appearances in corecore videos." Segalovich also wrote that "even more common are lonely, angry, and sometimes violent male protagonists from blockbusters like American Psycho, Blade Runner 2049, Fight Club, and Joker. Some monologue about how everyone, especially girls, has rejected them. Others scream at their female partners, their faces contorted in extreme expressions of rage. Once in a while, you'll see a shot from the perspective of a man climbing up a cliff and stepping off." Some TikTok users disagreed with this depiction of corecore, calling the more "fiercely environmentalist, anti-consumerist, and anti-capitalist" attitudes of early videos in the genre "real" corecore.

Mason Noel, noted by media writers to one of the aesthetic's earliest creators, wrote in an Instagram Stories post that "the whole point of [corecore] is to create something that can't be categorized, commodified, made into clickbait, or moderated—something immune to the functions of control that dictate the content we consume and the ideas we are allowed to hold."

== History ==
The term corecore can be traced back to the hashtag #corecore being used on Tumblr as early as 2020. However, its use on Tumblr and "especially" Twitter "existed solely as a pun on the literal definition of core, created out of users' frustrations of the over-saturation with the concept of "-cores", according to Townsend. Indeed, many online subcultures, niches, or aesthetics are categorized into their microtrend utilizing the core suffix, such as goblincore or cottagecore. As such, "corecore" is in sarcastic reference to this sort of categorization, which began proliferating in 2020. The origin and rise of corecore overlapped with a rise in popularity of digital culture in general, coinciding with the onset of the COVID-19 pandemic.

Hyperallergic writer Rhea Nayyar considers the online aesthetic "weirdcore" as a predecessor to corecore. When videos featuring the aesthetic first appeared on TikTok, they were known by the term nichetok, which is considered by media writers and users as a sister trend to corecore. Though technically different, the two terms are often used interchangeably by TikTok users. Nichetok is an aesthetic movement as well, but is "made up mostly of shitposts that reference multiple fandoms, subcultures, and genres – requiring one to have a niche understanding of TikTok trends." The terms chaos edit and 21st century humor are also related.

Early corecore videos on TikTok often had an anti-capitalist or environmentalist messaging. On January 1, 2021, Noel posted one of the genre's earliest videos on the platform. Noel's video stitched together clips of melting sea ice, Charli D'Amelio, a Black Friday sale, and Patrick Bateman of American Psycho. The 20-second video also included critiques of the United States military and was soundtracked by a somber violin piece. Tagged with the hashtags "#capitalism" and "#decay", Noel's video notably did not include the term corecore in its caption. Though the term's original creator is unknown, its usage as a hashtag dates back to July 2022, first used by "@heksensabbat". Media outlets and TikTok users alike consider artists such as Dylan Cherry, Eddie Hewer, Mason Noel, and John Rising as the pioneers of the genre. Called the "father" of the genre and having begun experimenting with the style in May 2021, Rising credits Nam June Paik as the originator of this type of video art.

Having blogged about the aesthetic in November 2022, digital culture blogger Kieran Press-Reynolds was cited by Time and Mashable as discussing the aesthetic in-depth. Press-Reynolds told Mashable that at the time he first wrote about corecore, "most of the popular clips [...] was frenetic — they were these rapid-fire 15-second montages of surreal memes (like cute cats, alpha wolf edits) with intense music (Drain Gang and other internet rap) that didn't have much of a discernible meaning beyond the pleasurable rush of recognizable audiovisual material."

By February 2023, the hashtag #corecore had received over 664 million views on TikTok. By March, the hashtag's views surpassed 2.1 billion.

== Critical analysis and reception ==
In covering corecore, many media writers used the terms "meta" (metamodernity) and "chaotic" to describe videos featuring the aesthetic, as well as the genre's commentary on society. Media writers were documented as generally praising the genre. TikTok users likewise were noted to be largely positively receptive to the aesthetic, being able to commonly relate to the themes and messaging found in the genre. The comment "real" was a common response to many corecore videos, for example. Press-Reynolds opined that "the chaotic and disordered structure of these clips [...] deftly captures feelings of technological disarray and ennui that I think a lot of young people relate with nowadays."

Ewens wrote that "some young people consider this genre to be merely content or, worse still, content about content. But many feel it speaks to them and their experiences on a deep emotional level." Many writers posed the question of if the aesthetic constitutes art, with Townsend commenting "the idea of corecore and what it can (or could) represent that has given rise to what some consider a genuine form of art by Gen-Z." Ewens further questioned if the aesthetic is a "new frontier in amateur documentary making," and added that corecore "mimics the way using [TikTok] is an overstimulating act of binge-watching a stream of short videos and voices," calling the trend a smart and sad commentary "on the proliferation of content in culture: self-focused, often narcissistic commentary, opinions, life-hacks and problem sharing."

Amanda Silberling of TechCrunch called corecore an "absurdist meme" and wrote that the aesthetic has "techno-futurism-doom vibes", with most of the genre's videos being "tied together by a general malaise — a concern that life has no meaning and technology is alienating us from one another." Silberling was among many contemporary media writers to compare corecore to Dadaism. Nayyar opined that corecore "reads as an art school freshman's first found-footage project in Adobe Premiere Pro [...] presented with the societal dread induced from doom-scrolling on one's phone at 2 am after one too many bong rips on a weeknight [...] but at the very least, it's an evidence-based manner of expressing one's frustrations with the world that seems to strike a chord with a large number of TikTok users." Felicity Martin of i-D wrote that corecore "might be the hardest to explain or rationalize" among TikTok trends, opining that the genre's videos "amateurishly splice together unrelated clips, touching on topics such as loneliness and feeling unattractive."

Segalovich noted the praise of corecore in many media articles from early 2023, commenting "They've lauded corecore for how vividly it evokes young people's frustration and panic looking down the barrel of climate and capitalist catastrophe," but opined that the coverage overlooked "the real message behind most of these videos: the terrifying rates of loneliness among young men and boys, which has led many into depression, suicide, and bigotry. And for some, corecore might only make it worse." Segalovich added that the themes in corecore videos could exacerbate depressed feelings for viewers. Segalovich also cited comparisons between Dada and corecore, noting that the two genres have a sense of despondency in response to world events, but opined that such "declarations of meaninglessness and hopelessness often lead to authoritarianism."

Writing about the aesthetic in retrospect for Flash Art in August 2023, Declan Colquitt and Hannah Cobb (jointly writing under the pseudonym Y7) stated that corecore "was a program of scale undertaken from an anti- anthropomorphic POV, an insensate delirium scanning an ultimately inconceivable hyperobject of communicative media; and yet it was also a program of yearning and melancholy; of cancelled futures, of attempts to reconcile with endcore's cauterized horizons."

== Related movements ==
=== Internet cinema ===
Internet cinema is a form of Internet inspired filmmaking. According to writer Bryan Liu of Dazed magazine, Palestinian artist Dana Dawud's Open Secret began as a "curatorial internet cinema programme" in 2024. The style has been described as not denoting art made about the Internet but representing the Internet through art. Liu states that, "This is the clear distinction they make between art about the internet (post-internet) and internet art (post-post-internet)." The phrase Post-CoreCore Internet cinema has also been used to denote a derivate of the style. Examples of Internet cinema include Dana Dawud's Monad, Peter Vack's www.RachelOrmont.com, and Angelicism01's Film01.

== See also ==
- -core
- Hopecore
- Internet aesthetics
- Remix culture
- Sludge content
- YouTube Poop
