= BJU =

BJU may relate to

- Beijing Jiaotong University, a Chinese university
- Bob Jones University, an American university
  - BJU Press, a publisher
- Bundesverband Junger Unternehmer, a German association of entrepreneurs
- BJU International, an academic journal
- BJU, the IATA code of the Bajura Airport in Nepal
- bju, the ISO 639 code of the Busuu language of Cameroon
