= Hyein Seo =

South Korean fashion brand

- Industry: Fashion
- Founded: 2014
- Founder: Hyein Seo
- Headquarters: Seoul, South Korea

Hyein Seo, stylized in all caps, is a South Korean fashion brand. Originally founded in 2014 with an emphasis on womenswear and streetwear, Hyein Seo has since explored more classical, handmade styles, as well as developed its menswear side.

The brand has been worn by the likes of NewJeans, Rihanna, Grimes, Kendrick Lamar, and many other celebrities in both the west and the east, while also spotlighted by publications like Tatler and Prestige. Vogue and Elle named it a Korean fashion brand to know.

== History ==
In 2013, South Korean designer Hyein Seo and Jinho Lee (the soon-to-be CEO of Hyein Seo) were studying together at the Royal Academy of Fine Arts in Antwerp, Belgium. There, Seo was inspired by Raf Simons and Maison Margiela, as well as Dario Argento and "punk and skate culture." Her thesis collection (for her master's degree in fashion design) was then selected for the VFiles Made Fashion show during New York Fashion Week in 2014. She also earned the Best Designer Award in the British Fashion Council's Emerging Talents category in the same year, as well as had her clothing worn by Rihanna, CL, G-Dragon have been seen wearing it.

Following her successes, Seo established the Hyein Seo line, with Lee as CEO, after which they regularly traveled back and forth between Belgium and South Korea in the brand's early days before settling down in the latter permanently in 2018. Their very first space was in Gangnam, which is where they have continued to operate a studio and physical shop.

Over time, Hyein Seo's aesthetics changed from "street couture" to more handmade, timeless pieces that will last in one's wardrobe regardless of wear or trend cycles. In AW23, Hyein Seo moved away from their previous gorpcore pieces and toward "a more classical direction... to ensure their clothes are long-lasting in both appeal and construction."

Additionally, starting with SS23, Lee sought to redirect the fashion brand to include "designing clothes for K-pop groups and Netflix shows" as part of its focus, in addition to augmenting its menswear lines. The brand's logo was also changed "to reflect the fact that we’re getting older and more mature." Since then, Hyein Seo has worked with K-pop girl groups like NewJeans and several Netflix Japan series.

== Collaborations ==
In 2022, Hyein Seo collaborated with New York City–based artist Somnath Bhatt on a collection centered around Indian folklore, mythology, and "celestial energy."

In June 2025, Hyein Seo collaborated with Nike on the Nike Ava Rover, a new "lifestyle sneaker" which launched in three colors.
