= Hopecore =

Social media trend promoting hope and optimism

- An example of a hopecore meme
- Type: Social media trend
- Formats: Video montages and slideshows
- Themes: Hope and optimism

Hopecore is a social media trend where participants share content intended to inspire hope and optimism. It typically features montages or slideshows of inspirational quotations and images, often accompanied with music. Common hopecore-themed videos include acts of kindness, personal achievements, and scenes from nature. Described as a "celebration of both little and big things in life", hopecore content often emphasizes the appreciation of everyday life and human connection.

Hopecore was started on TikTok as an optimistic offshoot of corecore. After gaining popularity on TikTok, it spread to Instagram, YouTube, Reddit, and X. By 2024, it was also being used ironically for videos that paired cheerful imagery and music with captions about personal problems.

Hopecore has been studied as a response to doomscrolling. While a 2026 study of Instagram posts and comments described hopecore as a form of communication that could encourage hope and appreciation of others, it has also drawn criticism for its simplistic reassurances and commercial exploitation by influencers.

== Reception ==
Writing for GQ, Kieran Press-Reynolds criticised hopecore's simplistic reassurances and its commercial exploitation by influencers: "In a godless internet landscape full of dodgy influencers and grifters, it has morphed into the algorithmic equivalent of a role model for kids, who comment about how the videos have changed their mindset and leave praise".

== See also ==
- -core
- Internet aesthetic
- New sincerity
- Toxic positivity
