= Whimsigoth =

Internet aesthetic

Whimsigoth is an Internet aesthetic that mixes elements of the gothic subculture with whimsical elements. The term was coined by architectural designer Evan Collins and has been described as blending "70s bohemia with more gothic influences from the '80s and '90s".

== History ==
The term, first coined by Evan Collins, co-founder of the Consumer Aesthetics Research Institute (CARI), as "whimsical mystical gothic celestial", is a portmanteau of "whimsical" and "gothic". He first used it to describe home decor, and the usage expanded to fashion as the term reached social media platform TikTok.

== Influences and visuals ==
Influences on the whimsigoth aesthetic include Stevie Nicks, Tim Burton films, and TV shows like Buffy the Vampire Slayer and Sabrina the Teenage Witch. The aesthetic incorporates astrological and celestial motifs, dark gothic or witchy elements, and a combination of darker colors and jewel tones.

In addition to the Gothic influences, Whimsigoth aesthetic intersects with other styles, including Witchcore and Cottagecore. Collins described the aesthetic as a "postmodern mélange of styles".

== See also ==
- Bohemianism
- Dark academia
- Goblincore
- Goth subculture
- Internet aesthetics
