= Dreamcore (aesthetic) =

Liminal internet aesthetic

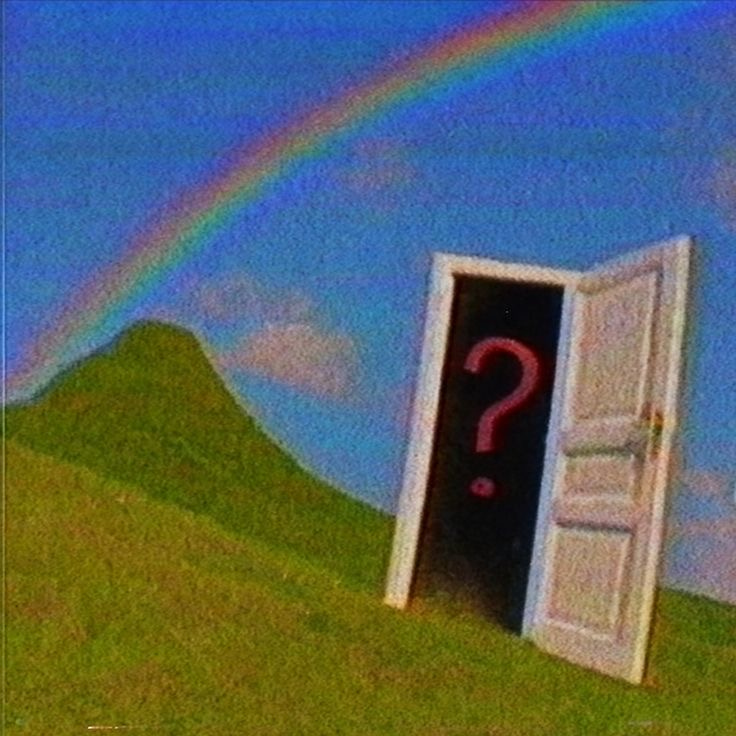
Dreamcore image which contains elements from the "Weirdcore" aesthetic

Dreamcore is a surreal Internet aesthetic that gained popularity in the early to mid-2020s. It focuses on visuals inspired by dreams and nostalgia.

== Characteristics ==
Dreamcore imagery combines familiar and dreamlike elements to create atmospheres that may be comforting, eerie or unsettling, including "hazy and recognizable old settings". This imagery may heavily rely on kenopsia to induce an unsettling environment. It commonly uses surreal or low-fidelity imagery, including optical illusions, clouds, long corridors and imagery associated with dreams or nightmares. Nylon profiled creator Jordan Gretzner, whose Dreamcore posts often addressed themes of existentialism and derealization. The aesthetic overlaps with Weirdcore and liminal-space imagery, mainly through its use of uncanny or seemingly familiar environments in popular culture. Dreamcore imagery depicts 2000s and 2010s environments, which can make the viewer experience nostalgia or anemoia.

== History ==
The precise origins of Dreamcore are unclear. The aesthetic gained traction on TikTok and in other online communities during the early to mid-2020s, obtaining millions of views on social media platforms.

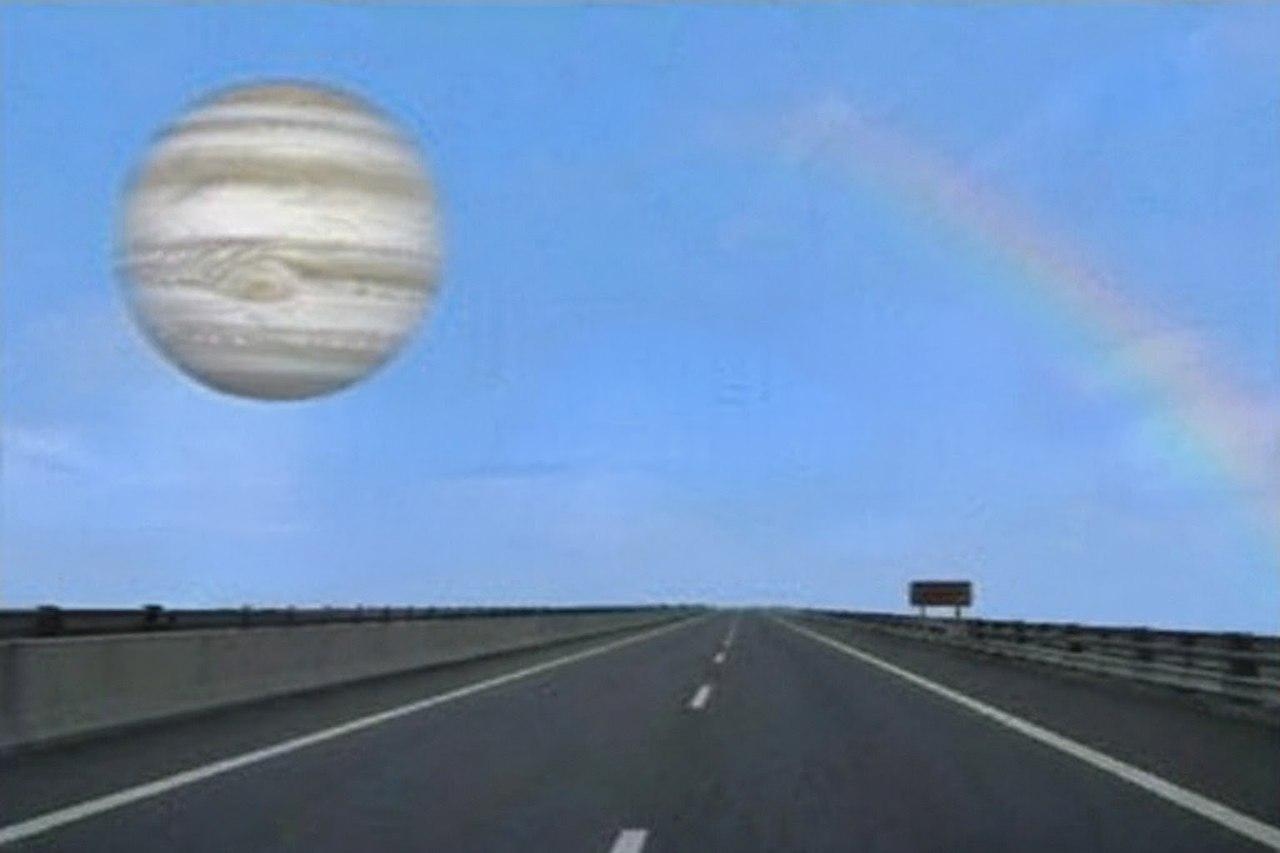
An image of a road with planet Jupiter linked to Dreamcore elements of surrealism

In China, the Dreamcore aesthetic is particularly popular among members of Generation Z, and centers primarily on recreating the feeling of an idealized version of early-2000s China.

== Reception and analysis ==
Nylon described Dreamcore as combining comfort and nostalgia with eeriness and unease. Writing for the magazine in 2021, Jack Riewe associated the aesthetic with surrealism, isolation, uncertainty and questioning reality. The publication reported that the #dreamcore hashtag had received approximately 923.7 million views on TikTok by October 2021.

A 2026 study involving 449 adults divided responses to Dreamcore imagery into two dimensions: darker or eerie imagery and warmer or comforting imagery. The researchers found that participants with stronger nostalgic tendencies tended to respond more positively to both dimensions. They described their findings as preliminary and noted that their selected images did not represent every possible form of Dreamcore.

Another example of Dreamcore imagery

== Related aesthetics ==
Dreamcore overlaps with multiple aesthetics, including Weirdcore, liminal spaces, and other similar aesthetics. Nylon described Dreamcore as a "sister" to Weirdcore. Academic research has identified liminal-space imagery as a possible major influence, while Dreamcore places particular emphasis on motifs associated with dreams, daydreams and nightmares.

== In media ==
The 2025 video game Dreamcore is based entirely around the Dreamcore aesthetic.
