= Older brother core =

Internet aesthetic

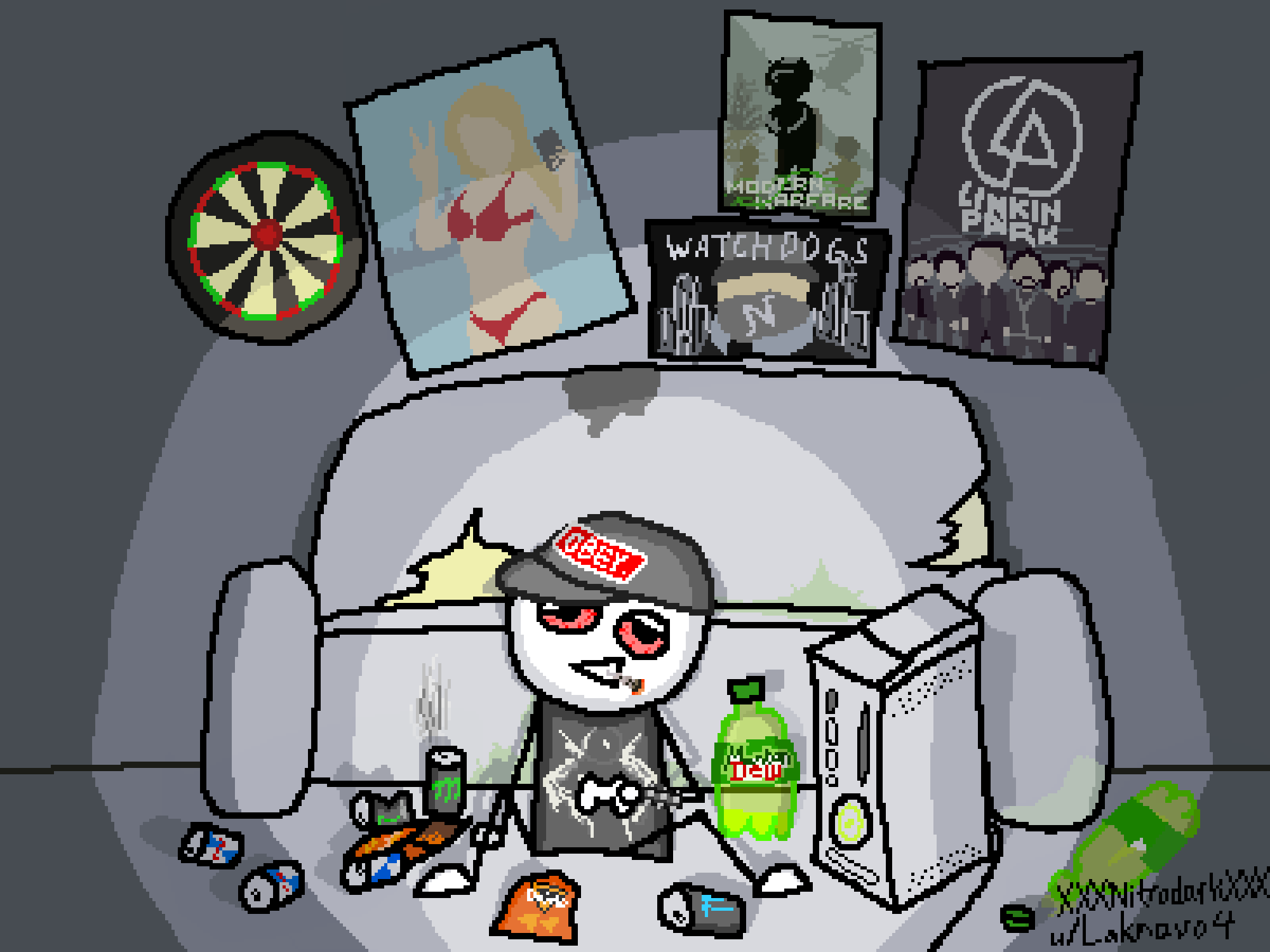
Pixel art drawing of a teenage boy in a cluttered room playing a video game, meant to emulate the aesthetic

Older brother core is an Internet aesthetic centered around the looks of objects, fashion, and traits associated with the lifestyles of teenage-aged "older brothers" between the 1990s and early 2000s, mainly in the United States and Canada. The aesthetic became popular among members of Generation Z through social media platforms such as TikTok and Reddit in the 2020s. It has been described as a subtrend of the Y2K aesthetic and an example of hauntology.

== Characteristics ==
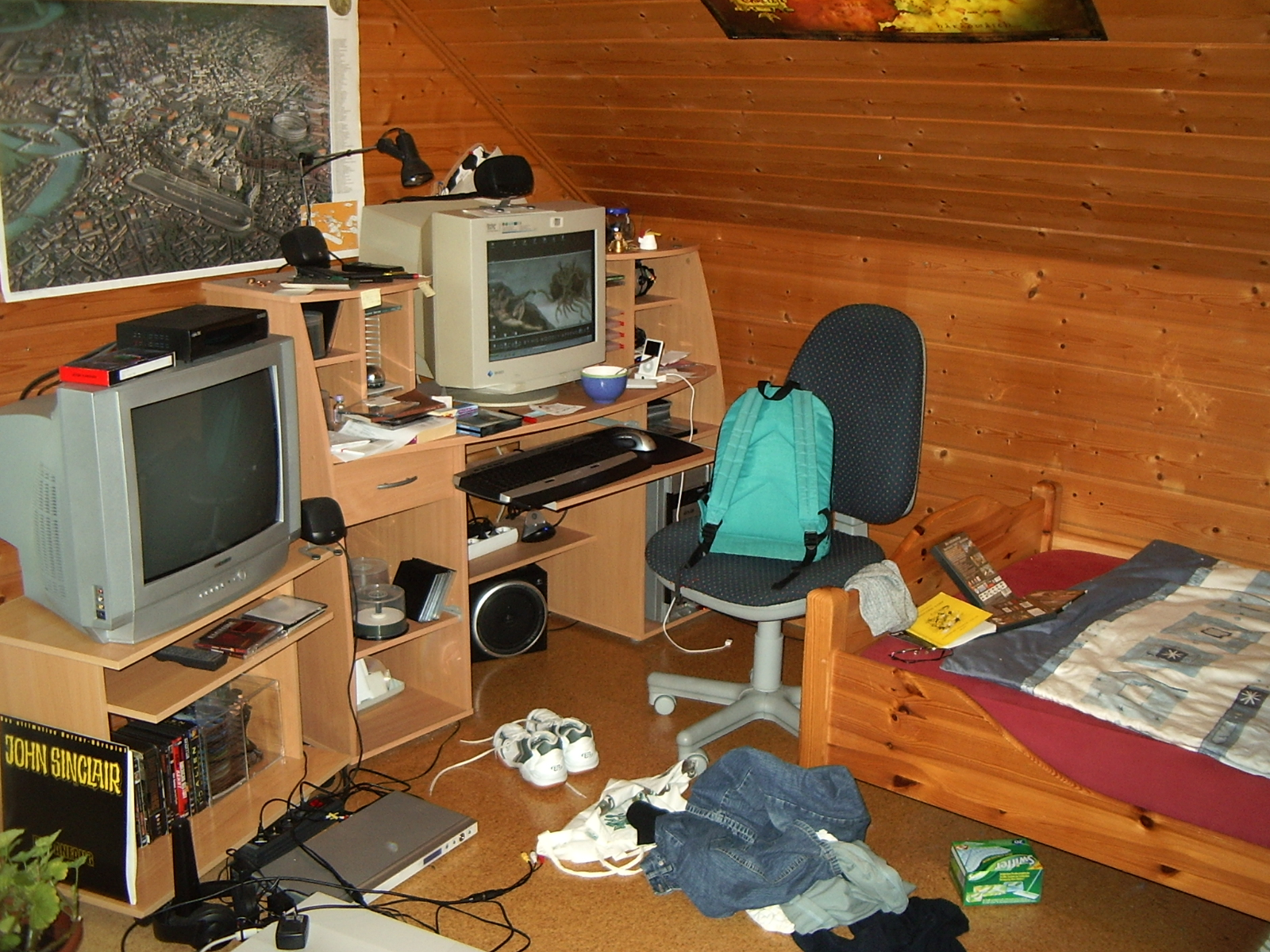
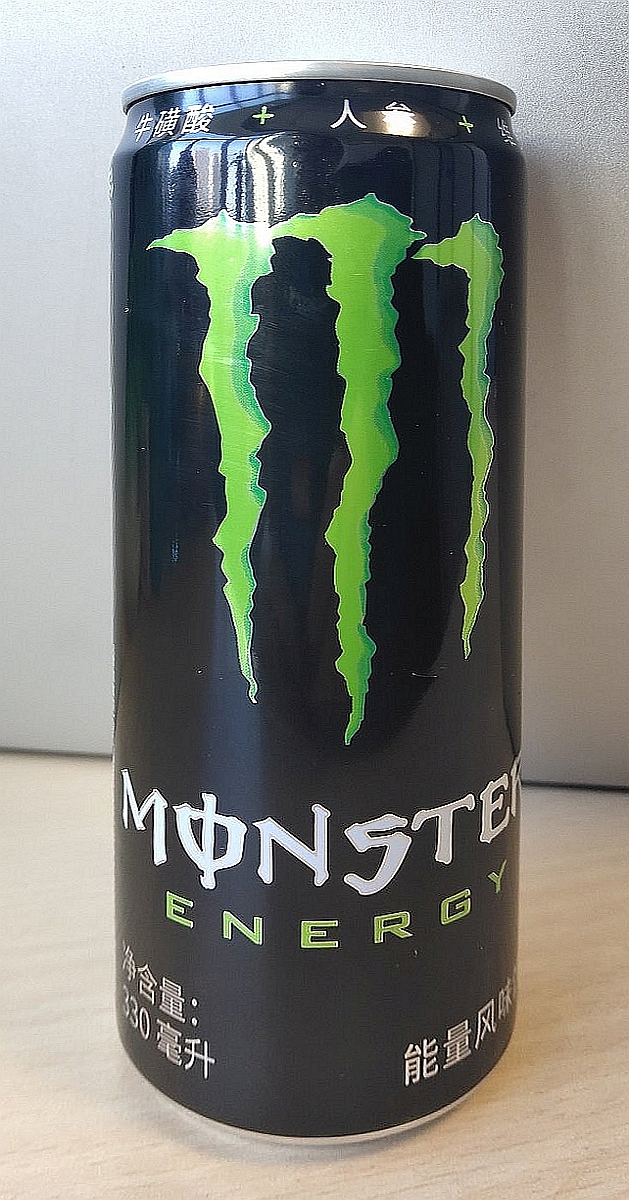
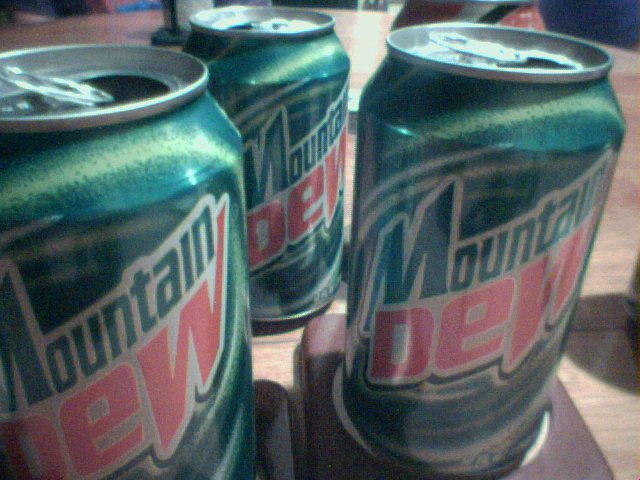
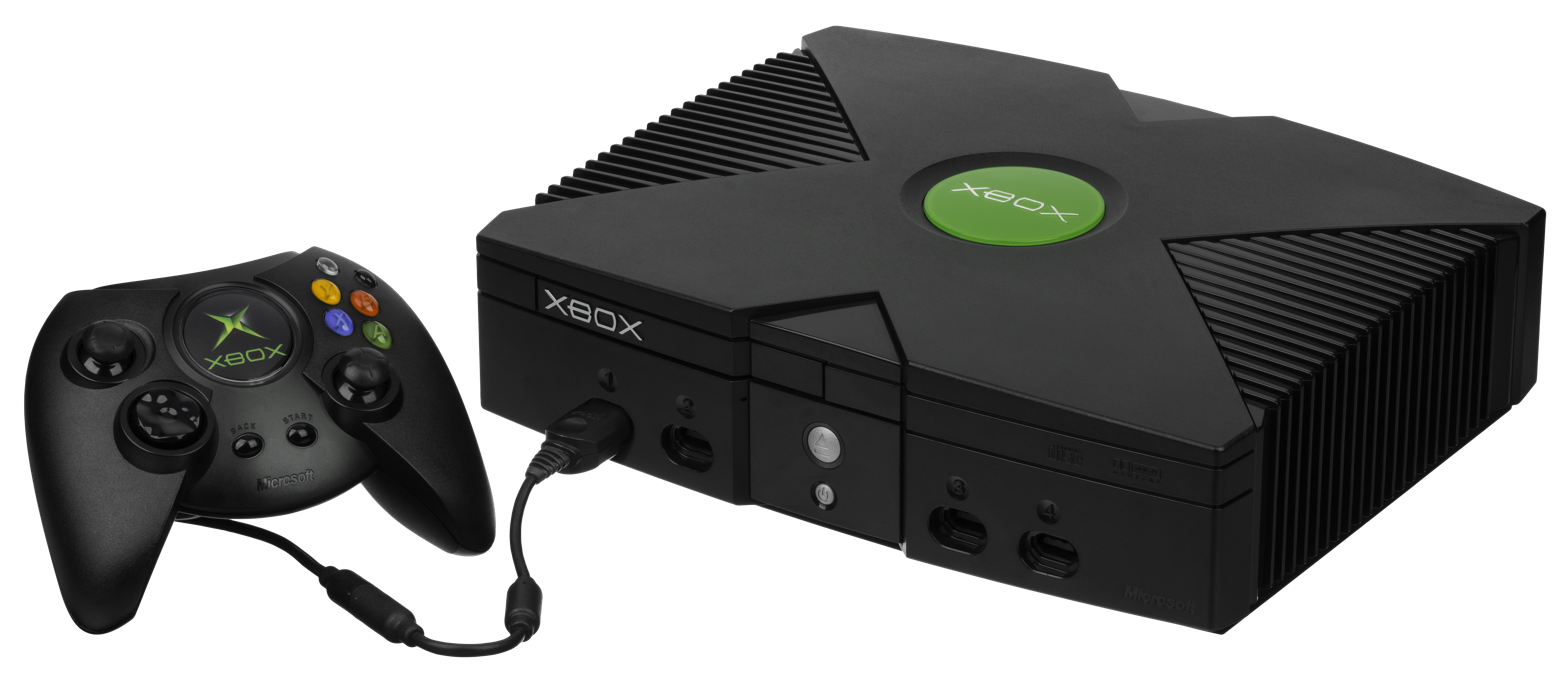
Cluttered teenage rooms, energy drinks like Monster Energy and Mountain Dew, and fifth/sixth-generation gaming are frequently recurring elements of the aesthetic.

Older brother core is an Internet aesthetic characterized by stereotypical imagery associated with everyday objects that were present in the life of an "older brother" who lived between the 1990s and early 2000s, as retrospectively perceived by a younger sibling. Prominent examples include cans of Monster Energy and Mountain Dew, early-2000s home video game consoles such as the original Xbox, towers of stacked CDs, flip phones, and baggy pants.

The aesthetic heavily appeals to nostalgic experiences made by younger siblings who witnessed the lifestyles of their older, often rebellious brothers. As such, it is closely related to activities that were popular among many teenagers around that time, such as skateboarding, playing video games on fifth- and sixth-generation consoles, or watching late-1990s to early-2000s anime series such as Yu-Gi-Oh!.

== See also ==
- Anemoia
- Zillennials
