= Closed GmbH =

German fashion brand

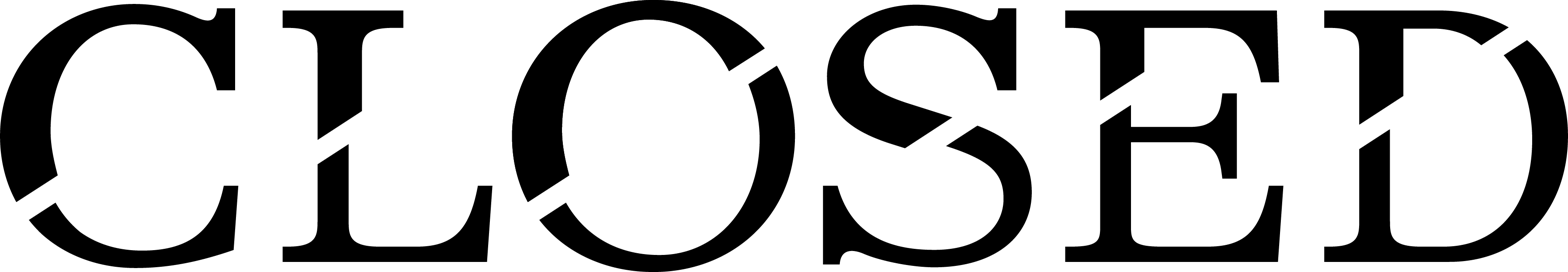
- Industry: fashion
- Key people: Gordon Giers (CEO)
- Products: Jeans and other clothes
- Production output: Invented the stonewash-procedure
- Number of employees: 140 (2009)

Closed GmbH is a German fashion brand which has produced jeans and other clothes since 1978. Besides Germany, Closed products are available in its more than 35 stores that are mostly in Italy, France, the Netherlands, Belgium, Great Britain, Russia, and the US.

== Company history ==
The company was founded in 1978 in France by Marithé and François Girbaud under the name “Ça”. Shortly afterwards, a preliminary injunction by C&A, who felt their trademark rights had been violated, put an end to Ca. Today, the company, under the name Closed, is based in Hamburg. In 2009, Closed GmbH had 140 members of staff.

At the beginning of the 1990s, Hamburg business partners Günther Giers and Hans-Joachim Leplow purchased the company and sold it in 2004 together with the brand to Günther Giers’ son Gordon and his business partners Til Nadler and Hans Redlefsen. In 2009, managing directors Giers, Nadler, and Redlefsen received the “Hamburger Unternehmer des Jahres” award (Entrepreneur of the year) from the marketing boards “Die Familienunternehmer – ASU” and “Die jungen Unternehmer – BJU”.

In 2012, Kostas Murkudis was appointed creative director to raise Closed's international profile. He left in 2013 due to creative differences. Gordon Giers is the current chief executive officer.

Closed was the creator of the stonewash production process and the x-pocket jean, they also had a popular model of pedal pushers, which combined have sold more than 30 million pairs.
