= Cottagecore =

Aesthetic of nostalgia popular among youths

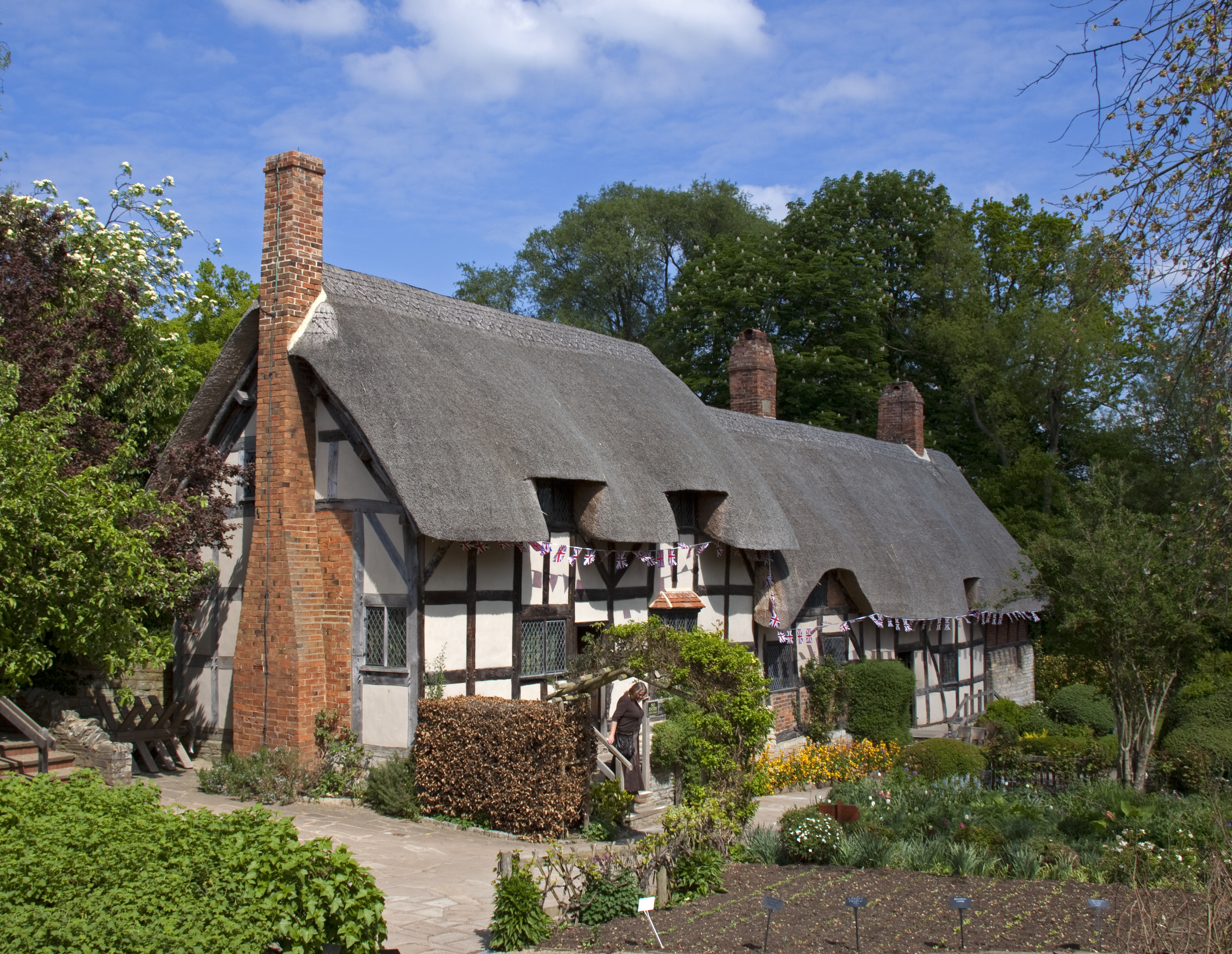
Anne Hathaway's cottage in Stratford-upon-Avon exemplifies the traditional style cottagecore prioritises. The garden designed by Ellen Willmott contains many herbs and flowers mentioned in Shakespeare's plays.

Cottagecore is an internet aesthetic and subculture centred on rural way of life. The aesthetic centres on traditional and vernacular architecture, clothing, interior design and crafts. Cottagecore was first named on Tumblr in 2018 and is related to similar internet aesthetics including goblincore and dark academia. A subculture of Millennials and Generation Z, cottagecore developed as a response to economic pressures faced by young people; the aesthetic emphasises sustainability, agrarianism and slow living.

In British English, the term cottage typically denotes a small, cosy building. During English Feudalism, cottages housed cotters (peasant labourers), who served their manorial lord. The term now describes many kinds of small houses of rustic or traditional style. Cottages are often associated with cottage gardens, which prioritise informal design and a mixture of ornamental and edible plants. Cottages are associated with non-urban landscapes, though the aesthetics of cottages and cottage gardens may be evoked in rural houses or in more urban environments.

== Aesthetic and lifestyle elements ==
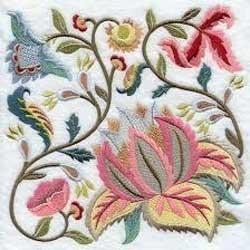
An embroidery design with colorful floral prints (2016)

Cottagecore satisfies an "aspirational form of nostalgia" for its proponents, as well as an escape from many forms of stress and trauma. The New York Times described it as a reaction to hustle culture and the advent of personal branding. The Guardian called it a "visual and lifestyle movement designed to fetishise the wholesome purity of the outdoors." Cottagecore emphasizes simplicity and a pastoral life as an escape from the dangers of the modern world. It became highly popular on social media during the COVID-19 pandemic. By encouraging proponents to spend time in nature, cottagecore may facilitate physical and mental self-care.

=== Design ===
==== Fashion ====
Hipster fashion of the 2000s and 2010s prefigured many of the aesthetics of cottagecore. Continued interest in vintage clothing, facial hair, "authenticity", and co-opting the aesthetics of past generations fueled a burgeoning cottagecore subculture after the hipster trend began to wane. Prairie clothing, pioneer clothing, homesteader clothing, Victorian silhouettes, wool, calico muslin, button downs, and worn leather are often incorporated into the cottagecore style.

Analytics company EDITED identified that, besides floral prints and stripes, "Old-world, feminine shapes and details are integral to this aesthetic—milkmaid necklines, puff sleeves, ruffles and prairie-inspired midi dresses." Marketing commentators noted that the trend fits with already available 1970s-inspired dresses, lace trim, and denim, and complements the slow fashion trend. Brands like Batsheva, Doen, and the Vampire's Wife became popular for their frilly, whimsical flowy dresses that fit the cottagecore aesthetic.

==== Interior Design ====
Cottagecore has also influenced interior design, extending its pastoral and nostalgic themes into domestic spaces. The style emphasizes vintage or antique furnishings, natural materials, soft textiles, and floral patterns arranged to evoke the atmosphere of a rural cottage. Coverage in publications such as House Beautiful, The Spruce, and Homes & Gardens describes cottagecore interiors as prioritizing comfort, simplicity, and a connection to nature, often incorporating handmade or artisanal objects, muted color palettes, and indoor greenery.

=== Food and gardening ===
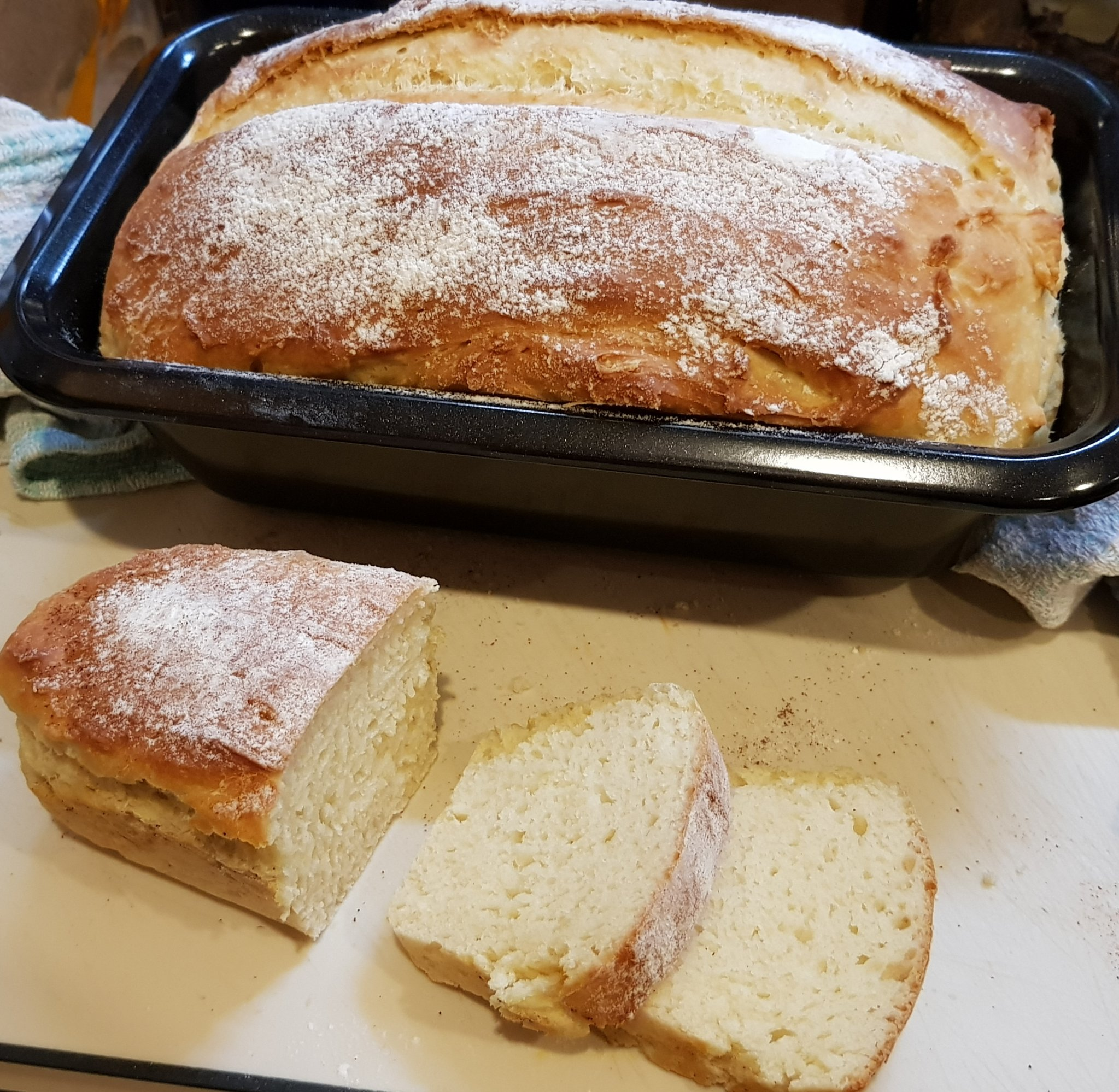
Self-sufficiency, such as baking one's own bread, is integral to cottagecore.

The practices of homesteading reflect the cottagecore philosophy of self-sufficiency. This could include growing one's own food in one's own garden, making meals from scratch, and baking one's own bread. Cottagecore gardening is intended to be environmentally friendly, often including permacultural farming practices. For example, the cultivation of a variety of perennial and annual native plants (i.e. plants endemic to the areas near one's home) helps attract insects, including bees, and as such promotes biodiversity and increases pollination of food-producing crops.

=== Crafts ===
Followers of cottagecore typically purchase secondhand, vintage, hand-built, or primitive furniture. Popular hobbies are often related to self-sufficiency including quilting, knitting and crochet.

== Antecedents and cultural context ==
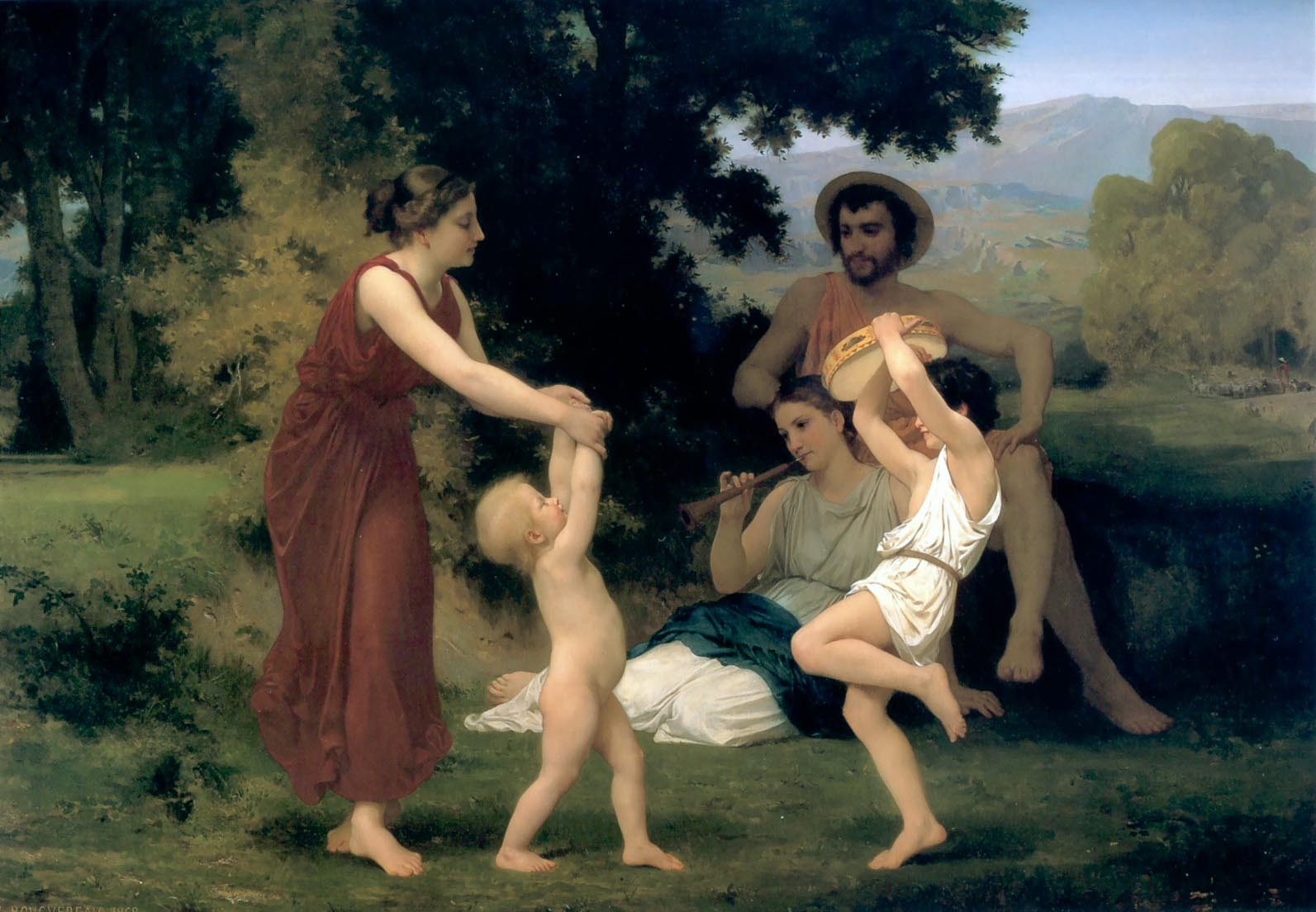
Pastoral Recreation (1868) by William-Adolphe Bouguereau

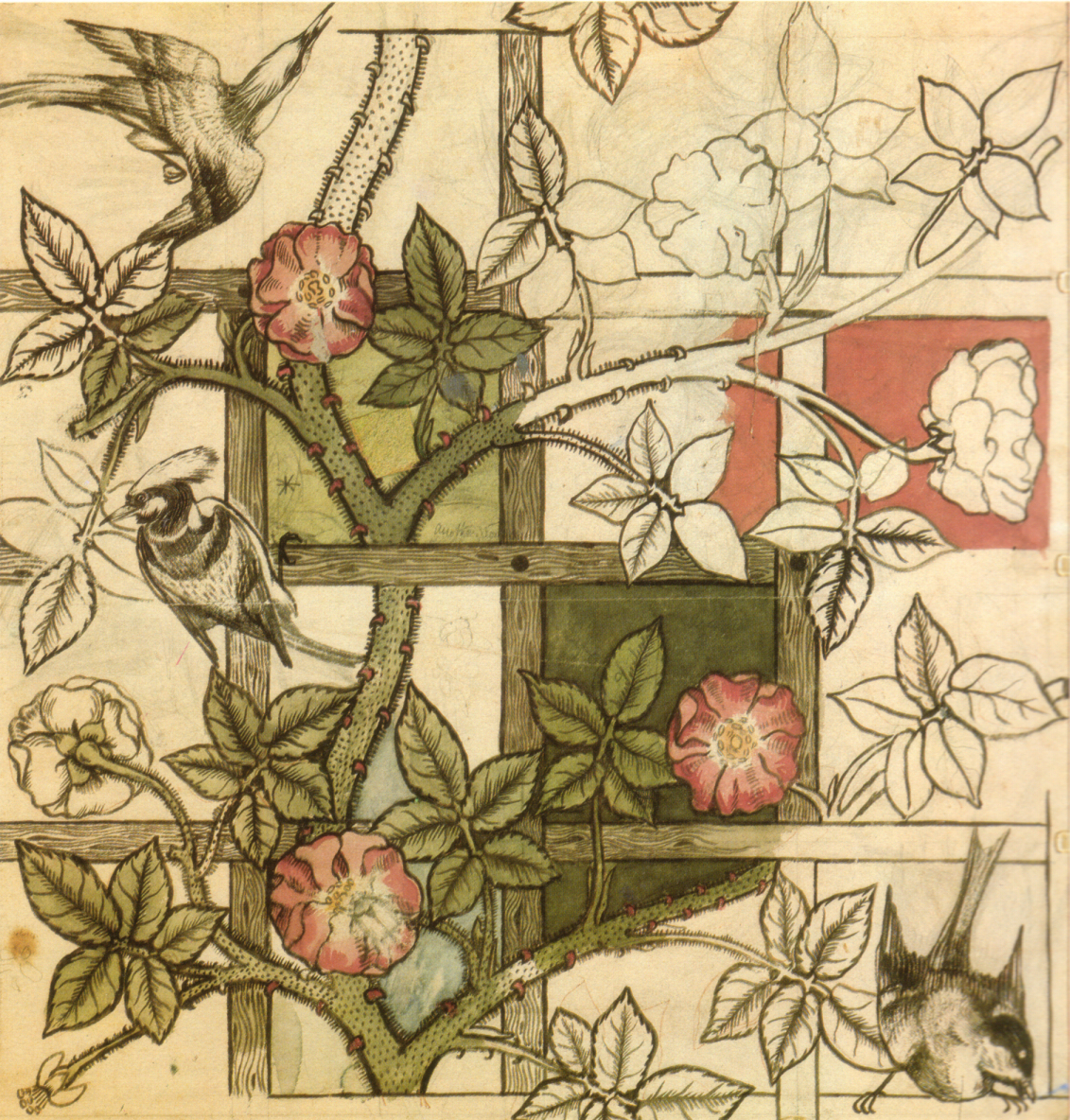
Arts and Crafts design for Trellis wallpaper (1862) by William Morris

While cottagecore arose as a named aesthetic in 2018, similar aesthetics and ideals existed prior to its inception. The pastoral genre developed by the Hellenistic Greeks characterised the rural Arcadia as an idyllic landscape in which shepherds and shepherdesses enjoy leisure. The works of the Hellenistic poet Theocritus were primarily aimed at an educated urban class who sought an escape, physical or imaginative, from the filth and disease associated with city life. The Roman poet Virgil developed the genre by acknowledging contemporary issues through the pastoral device. Pastoral escapism continued to be produced for the courtly audience of the Roman Empire in the format of novels such as Daphnis and Chloe from the second century AD.

The fourteenth-century Italian Renaissance poet Petrarch was known for his hill-walking and gardening as well as his pastoral poetry. English playwright William Shakespeare wrote two pastoral plays: As You Like It and A Winter's Tale. Christopher Marlowe's poem The Passionate Shepherd to His Love inspired a poetic response written by Walter Raleigh, The Nymph's Reply to the Shepherd, in which the speaker observes that Arcadian ideas were fallacies.

In eighteenth-century Europe it was fashionable to build follies, ornamental structures often built in the style of classical architecture or to mimic rustic villages. Marie Antoinette's Hameau de la Reine, a rustic model village, is a primary example of a folly in a pastoral style.

The Arts and Crafts movement of the nineteenth century was an approach to art, architecture, and design that embraced 'folk' styles and techniques as a critique of industrial production. Several Victorian institutions including Morris & Co. and the Pre-Raphaelite Brotherhood popularised a medievalist style, leading to a revived interest in rustic and vernacular architectural and furnishing styles.

Thomas Kinkade sold millions of copies of his paintings of idyllic cottages.

There have been similar aesthetics in specific countries, such as Japan's iki (detached elegance), Germany's fernweh (wanderlust), or Denmark's hygge (satisfying comfort).

== Contemporary popularity ==
The aesthetic gained traction in many online spheres and on social media in 2020 due to the mass quarantining in response to the COVID-19 pandemic. Networks such as the blogging site Tumblr had a 150% increase in cottagecore posts in the three months from March to May 2020. It spread on Pinterest, a platform for sharing visual ideas. It became popular on TikTok as well, with numerous cottagecore enthusiasts sharing videos of themselves living in rural areas, bathing in the forest, or baking bread.

On TikTok, the LGBTQIA+ community has been particularly fond of cottagecore, especially lesbians. Many young women have found a sense of femininity through dressing in a cottagecore aesthetic while still feeling aligned with a modern, in-control woman archetype. The New Yorker asserted that such videos had "evoked a mood of calm, enlightened, prettified productivity." Vox characterized the trend as "the aesthetic where quarantine is romantic instead of terrifying."

Living in the style of cottagecore or simply looking at others doing the same on the Internet was seen as something that could help people de-stress. Speaking to CNN, psychologist Krystine Batcho noted that it should be no surprise nostalgia in general and cottagecore in particular was in vogue during such a stressful time. "Longing for simpler situations, simpler time periods or simpler ways of living is an effort to balance out and to counteract the effects of high-intense stress," she said. This period was when many urban residents questioned whether it was worth living in the cities, and rural life stood as an appealing alternative.

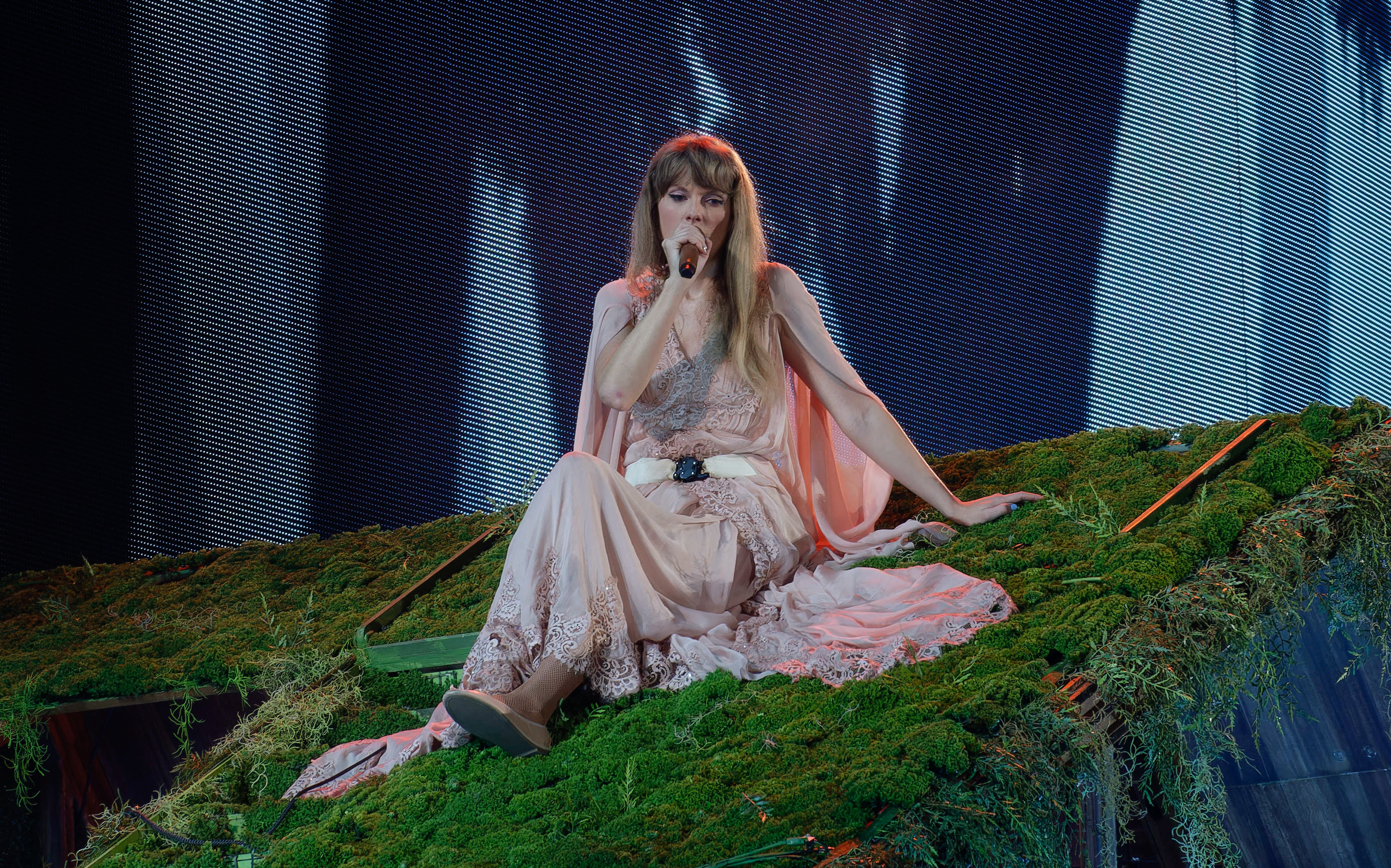
Taylor Swift enhanced the popularity of cottagecore in 2020 with her eighth studio album, Folklore.

A New York Times article compared cottagecore to the social simulation video game series Animal Crossing being acted out in real life, coinciding with the success of the then-newest entry in the franchise Animal Crossing: New Horizons. In July 2021 The Sims 4 released an expansion pack called "Cottage Living", which focuses on floral prints, gardening and tending to animals like chickens and llamas.

American musician Taylor Swift's 2020 album, Folklore, has been credited with increasing the aesthetic's popularity. She continued the aesthetic with its follow-up record, Evermore (2020), and applied it to her performance at the 63rd Annual Grammy Awards. The music videos for "Cardigan" and "Willow" both incorporate cottagecore imagery. Other public figures who embraced this style include British actress Millie Bobby Brown, American musician Hayley Kiyoko, American model Hailey Bieber, and English footballer David Beckham.

In the United States, cottagecore became a decorating trend for the 2020 holiday season, while the sales of needlework kits skyrocketed. In 2021, the Royal Horticultural Society noted that cottage gardening was a key design style.

China has its own version of cottagecore. Even though the country is rapidly urbanising as part of economic development, many young people have decided to leave the cities after their university studies for their hometowns in the countryside, where the quality of life has improved thanks to, among other things, the availability of fast Internet access, new roads, and high-speed railways. Among the returning youths are cottagecore-minded architects.

== Critiques ==
Its critics say cottagecore offers an unrealistic, romanticised view of rural life. They note the contrast between idyllic depictions of rural life constructed by the aesthetic and some of the realities of such spaces, such as the effects of rural poverty or lack of sanitation. Lara Prendergast of The Spectator wrote, "Privileged humans have always hankered for the simple and rustic", and recalled criticism of Marie Antoinette's mock-village, in which she dressed as a shepherdess while servants performed the manual labour necessary for its upkeep.

Rebecca Jennings of Vox magazine described cottagecore and dark academia as "historical aesthetics that evoke conservative values and gender roles". Jennings and others also noted themes of Eurocentrism and heteronormativity.

== See also ==
- 1960s decor
- Agrarianism
- Back-to-the-land movement
- Food forest
- Internet aesthetics
- Off-the-grid
- Simple living
- Slow movement
- Tradwife
- -core
