= Internet aesthetic =

Visual styles and subcultures associated with the internet

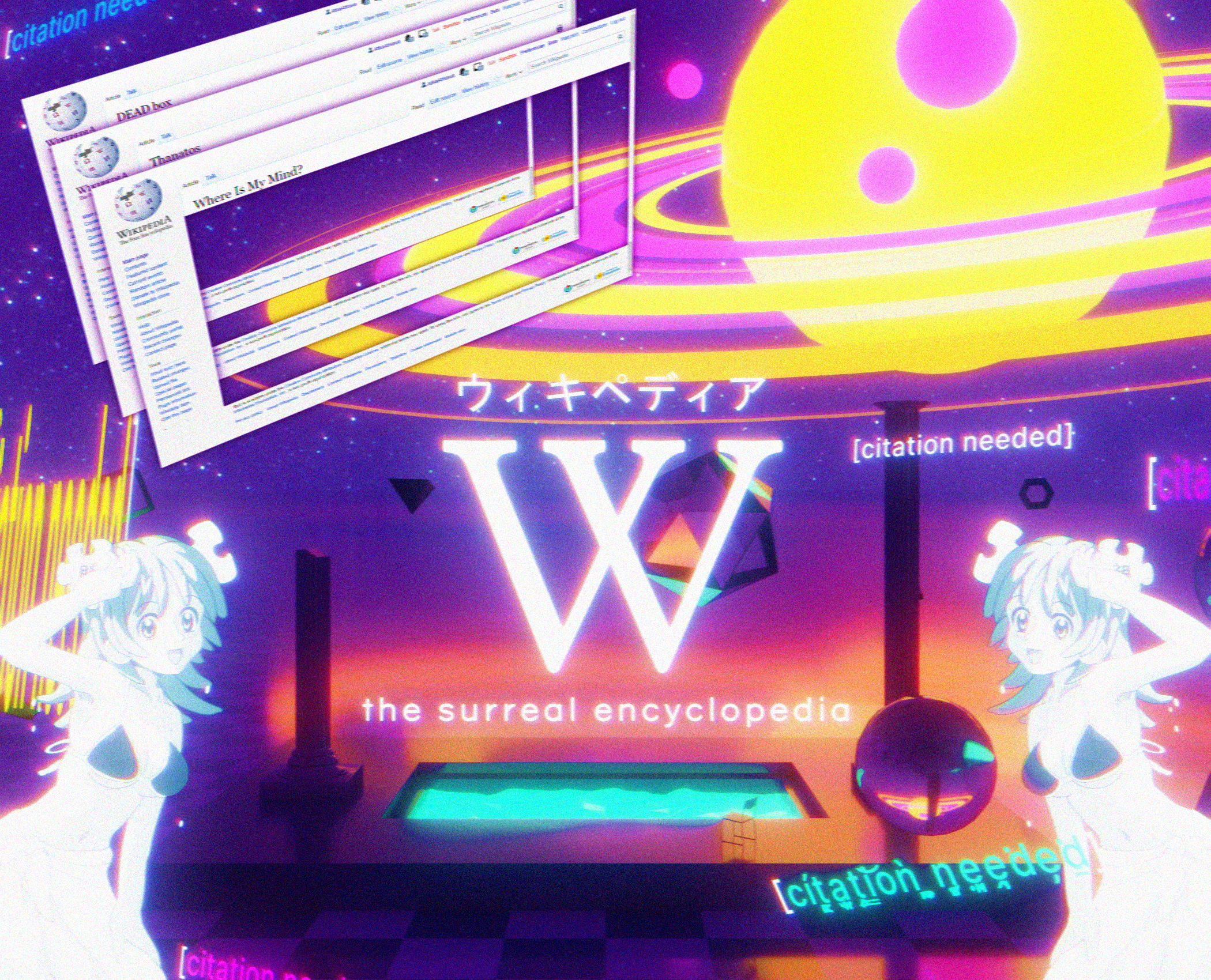
Vaporwave is one of the most prominent and notable early Internet-centric aesthetics that emerged in the 2010s.

An Internet aesthetic is a visual style, subculture, or thematic trend that originated and proliferated primarily through the Internet. Originally emerging out of the early online blogosphere among Millennials in the late 2000s, such aesthetics gained significant cultural traction throughout the 2010s and 2020s amongst Gen Z. Internet aesthetics encompass a wide range of niche communities and visual identities associated with contemporary youth subcultures defined by their digital circulation, curated imagery, and symbolic references to technology, nostalgia, and alternative culture, typically blending elements of fashion, music, visual art, and memes.

Originally, these aesthetics were often associated with early blog-based platforms such as Tumblr and MySpace, where users typically personalize their profiles to express their interests. By the late 2010s and early 2020s, they evolved to encompass social media platforms like TikTok and Instagram, with the COVID-19 lockdowns being linked to the wider proliferation of these aesthetics online. Notable Internet aesthetics include Vaporwave, Cottagecore, Goblincore, Gorpcore, E-girls and E-boys, and 2020 Alt.

Although internet aesthetics have been influential in wider fashion, visual art, and music, they have also been linked to the decline of monoculture and traditional youth subcultures, with writers often citing the fractured nature of the Internet and the proliferation of microgenres as factors that are redefining the concept of counterculture in the 21st century.

== History ==
=== 1980s ===
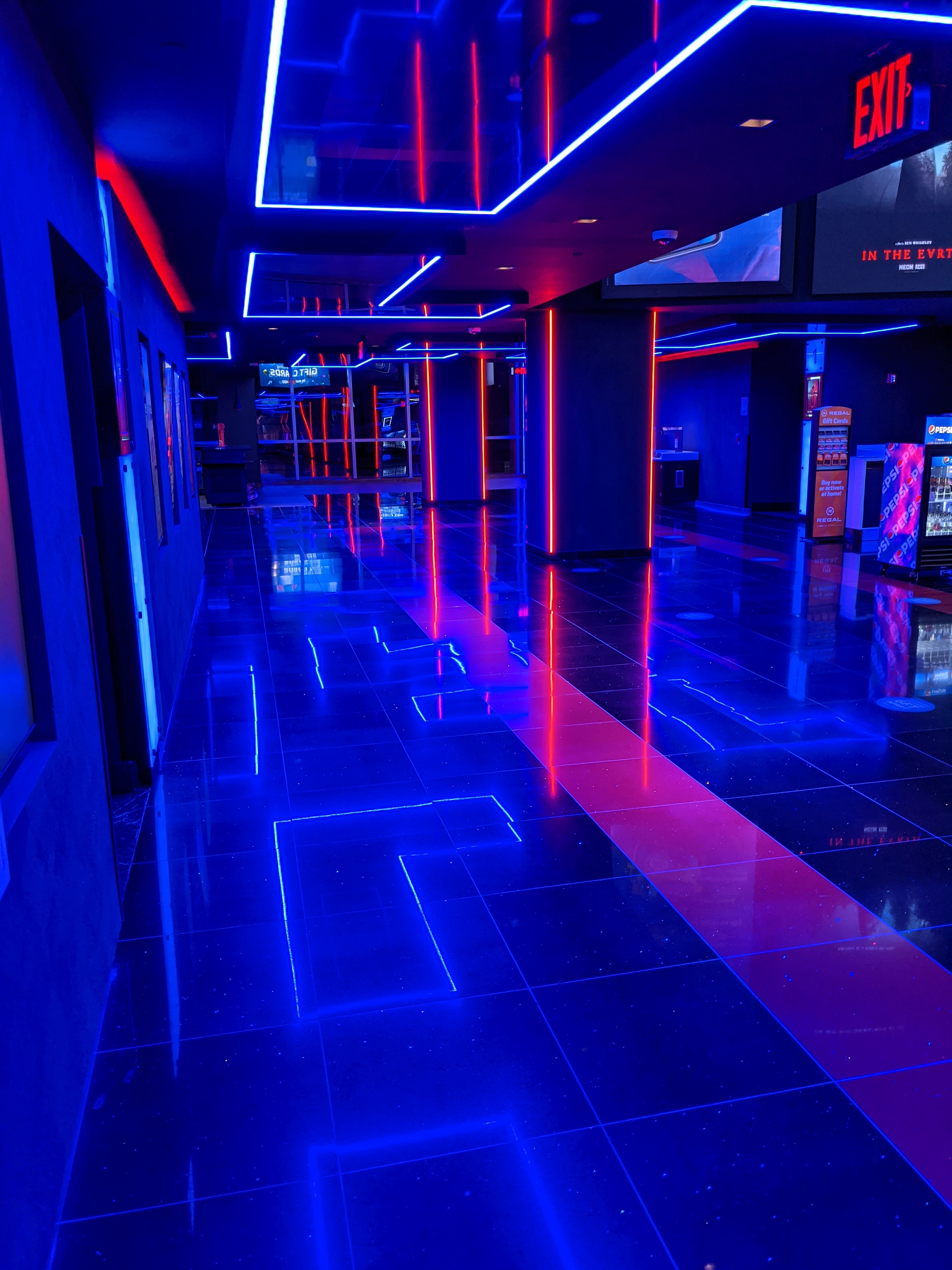
Photograph of a lobby design which was heavily influenced by the Cyberpunk sci-fi genre

The use of aesthetic suffixes, particularly -punk, has its origins in the 1980s. Cyberpunk was a literary sub-genre in science fiction that evolved into a visual aesthetic depicting dystopian futures shaped by advanced technology and cybernetics. Minnesota writer Bruce Bethke coined the term in 1983 for his short story "Cyberpunk", which was published in an issue of Amazing Science Fiction Stories. The aesthetic grew in popularity during the 1980s, influencing films like Blade Runner, Tron, Videodrome, The Terminator and RoboCop. The cyberpunk genre later developed into its own subculture which was sometimes associated with early hacker culture, as well as an early online community, which included a dedicated Usenet newsgroup. Usenet is widely regarded as an early precursor to modern Internet forums, discussion boards, and social media platforms. By the early 1990s, some trends in fashion and music were also labeled as cyberpunk, with the aesthetic also appearing prominently in anime and manga (Japanese cyberpunk) such as Akira, Ghost in the Shell and Cowboy Bebop.

In 1988, the term 'Cybergoth' was coined by Games Workshop for their roleplaying game Dark Future, which developed into a fashion style and subculture the following decade.

In the mid-to-late 1980s, the term 'steampunk' was coined by science fiction author K. W. Jeter as a tongue-in-cheek variant of "cyberpunk", to define a retrofuturist aesthetic blending Victorian-era design with steam-powered machinery. These terms and early derivatives laid the groundwork for later aesthetic naming conventions in internet subcultures such as seapunk and biopunk. Suffixes such as -core deriving from hardcore punk, -gaze deriving from shoegaze, -wave deriving from new wave, and -punk deriving from punk rock have been used to describe internet visual aesthetics. The terms sleaze (as in indie sleaze) and corecore arose in response to the overusage of -core to refer to visual aesthetic trends. Internet aesthetics have also been influenced by and linked to the post-Internet contemporary art movement of the mid-2000s to early 2010s.

=== 1990s–2000s ===
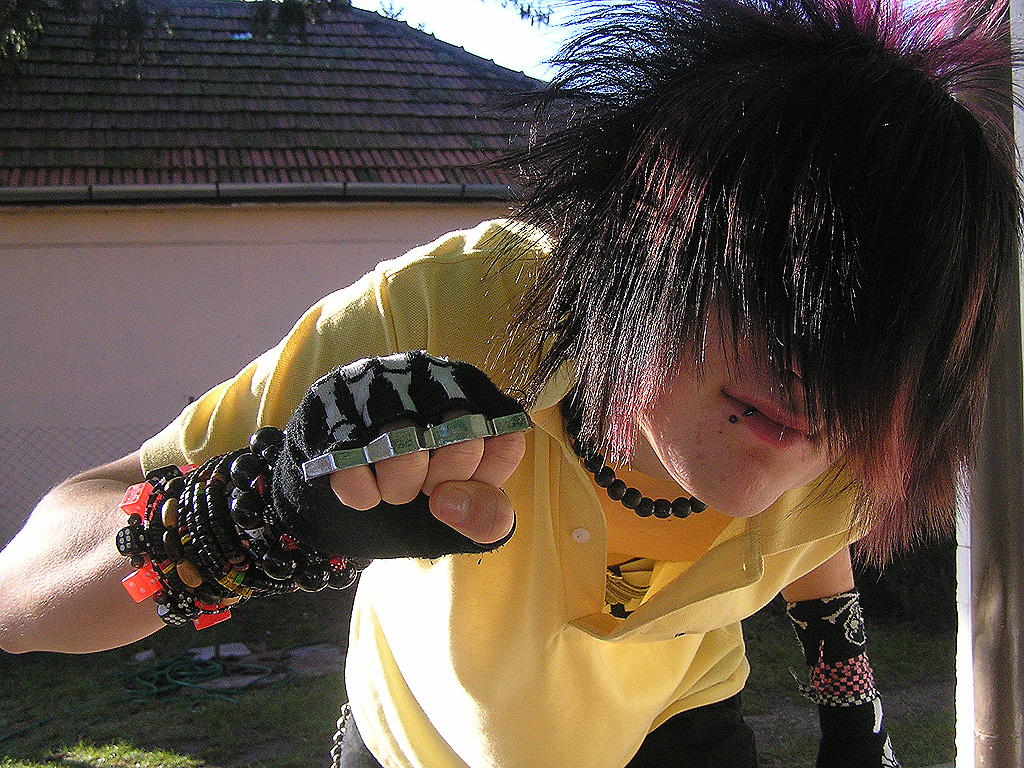
An example of a 2000s-era scene kid

During the late 1990s and 2000s, mall goth emerged as a subculture to describe a style of goth fashion centered around nu metal, industrial metal, emo and the Hot Topic store chain. Due to the term emerging as a pejorative, similar to the use of poseur, it was largely considered a separate subculture simply influenced by goth. With the increased usage of the Internet and social media in the mid-to-late 2000s, mall goths became frequent users of sites such as MySpace and Pure Volume. Other early internet subcultures included scene kids, who emerged in the mid-late 2000s, drawing influence from metalcore, crunkcore, deathcore, electronic music, and pop punk, as well as gaining popularity through the early social media website MySpace. The fashion style of metalcore band Eighteen Visions, which was labelled "fashioncore", also helped originate the visual style and aesthetic of the scene subculture. Additionally, the visual and fashion style of many 2000s indie music scenes, later labelled as indie sleaze, led to the emergence of the soft grunge aesthetic, which I-D magazine called one of the earliest internet aesthetics.

By the late 2000s, several internet aesthetics would emerge amongst Millennials, with the rise of online microgenres during the blogosphere era. One of the earliest examples of a purely internet-driven music microgenre was chillwave, which was coined by the ironic music blog Hipster Runoff around 2009 as an internet meme. Although microgenres and scenes coined online like shitgaze, bloghouse, blog rap and blog rock predated it, chillwave became the first musical genre to develop primarily through the internet. Though it was strictly a musical genre, chillwave went on to be influential on future online aesthetic developments like vaporwave.

=== 2010s ===
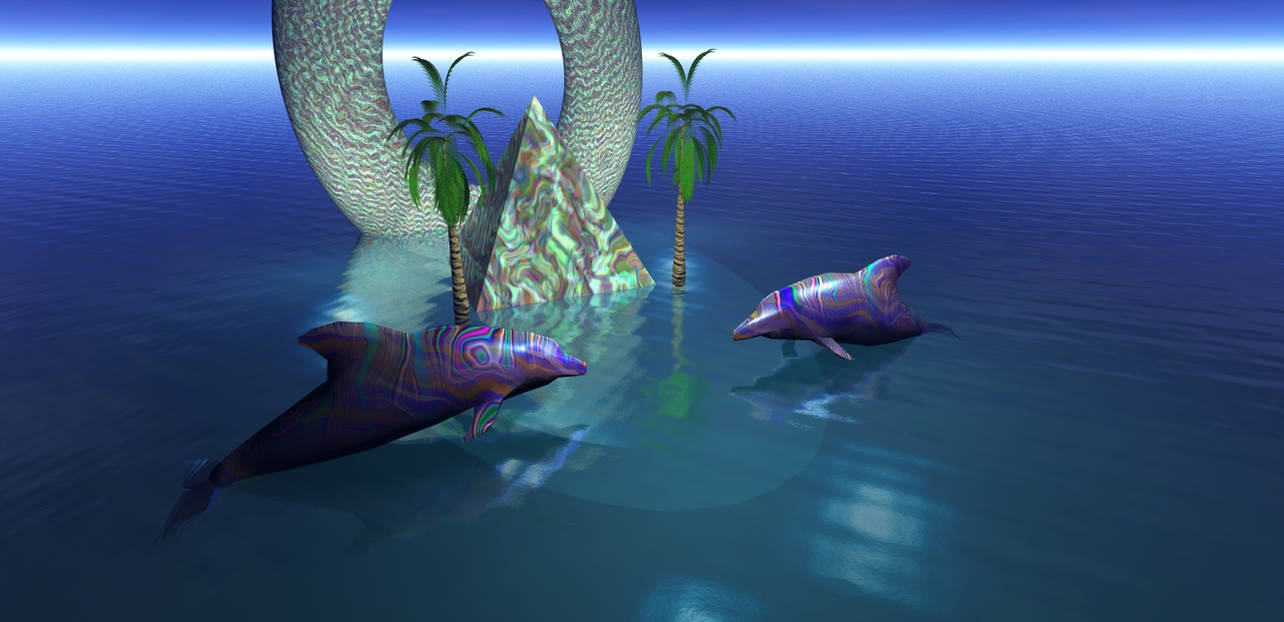
Example of seapunk aesthetic

The first widely recognized internet aesthetic was seapunk, coined by DJ Lil Internet in 2011 in a humorous tweet: "Seapunk leather jacket with barnacles where the studs used to be." The term quickly spread on Tumblr to describe a distinctive blend of 1990s web iconography, ocean motifs, and cyberpunk visuals. In 2012, seapunk gained mainstream attention when rapper Azealia Banks used seapunk imagery in her "Atlantis" music video, while singer Rihanna's "Diamonds" performance on Saturday Night Live drew visual aesthetic influences from the movement. Seapunk was notable for its intentional embrace of kitsch and digital surrealism, marking the development of aesthetics as cohesive visual subcultures born entirely online. The aesthetic also developed into its own musical style, pioneered by musician and producer Ultrademon. This era saw the creation of similarly themed aesthetics like Health Goth, Whimsigoth and Witch house. The first -core related fashion trend was normcore in 2013, a term coined by trend forecasting group K-HOLE to refer to a style of plain clothing.

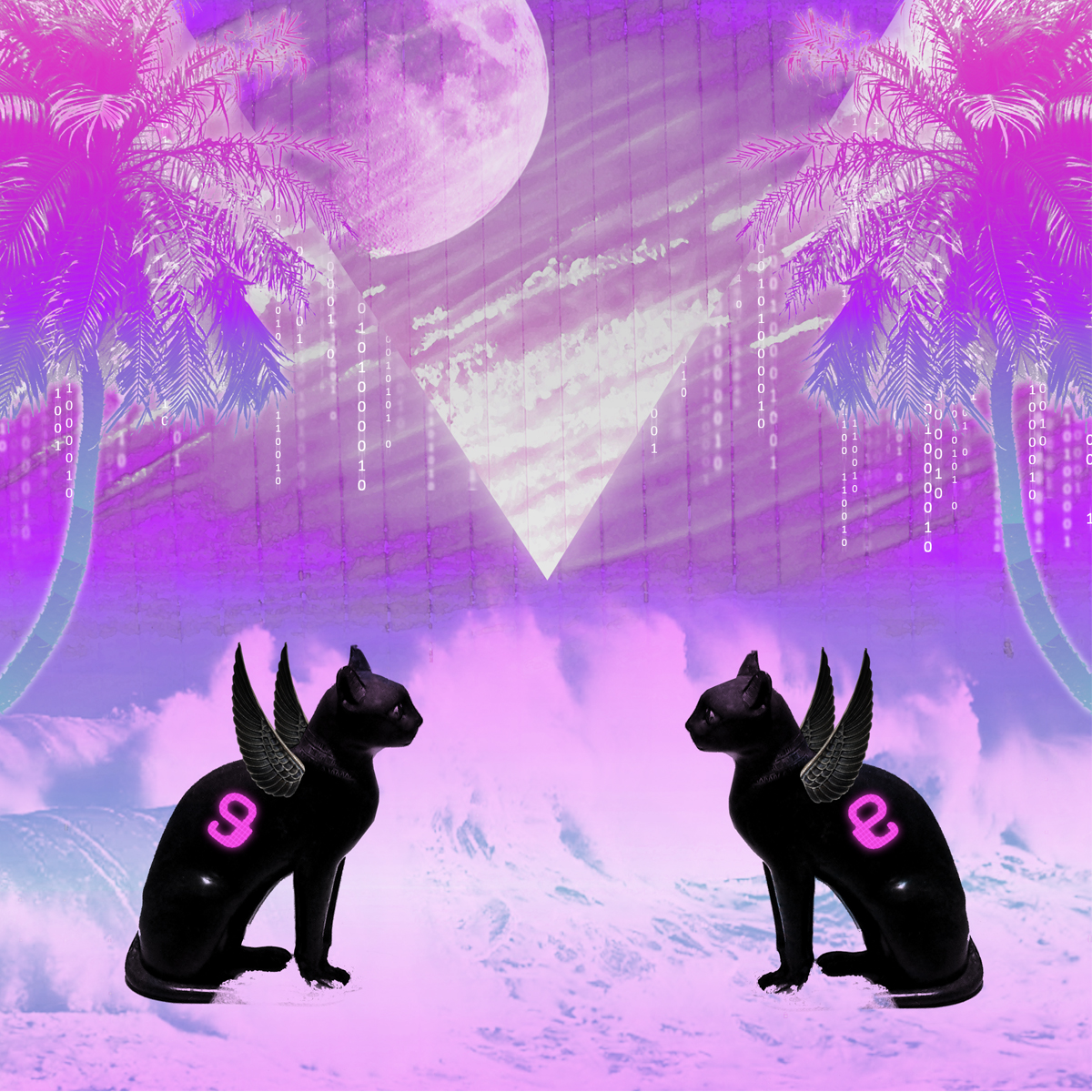
Example of Vaporwave aesthetic

At this time, several internet aesthetics began to emerge online, with the most prominent and influential from this period being Vaporwave. Derived from the term vaporware, Vaporwave was an internet music microgenre, aesthetic, and subculture that originally grew out of hypnagogic pop and chillwave in the late 2000s to early 2010s. The visual aesthetic was defined by retro-style imagery and early internet iconography, 1990s Web design, glitch art, and cyberpunk tropes, as well as anime, Greco-Roman statues, VHS degradation, and 3D-rendered objects. These aesthetics would also influence wider online culture, with internet rapper Yung Lean taking influence from vaporwave aesthetics. The vaporwave era would prove to be a pivotal influence to later internet aesthetics, with many of its traits such as early internet nostalgia becoming a key inspiration in the late 2010s to early 2020s, as seen with the revival of the Y2K aesthetic and Frutiger Aero.

=== 2020s ===
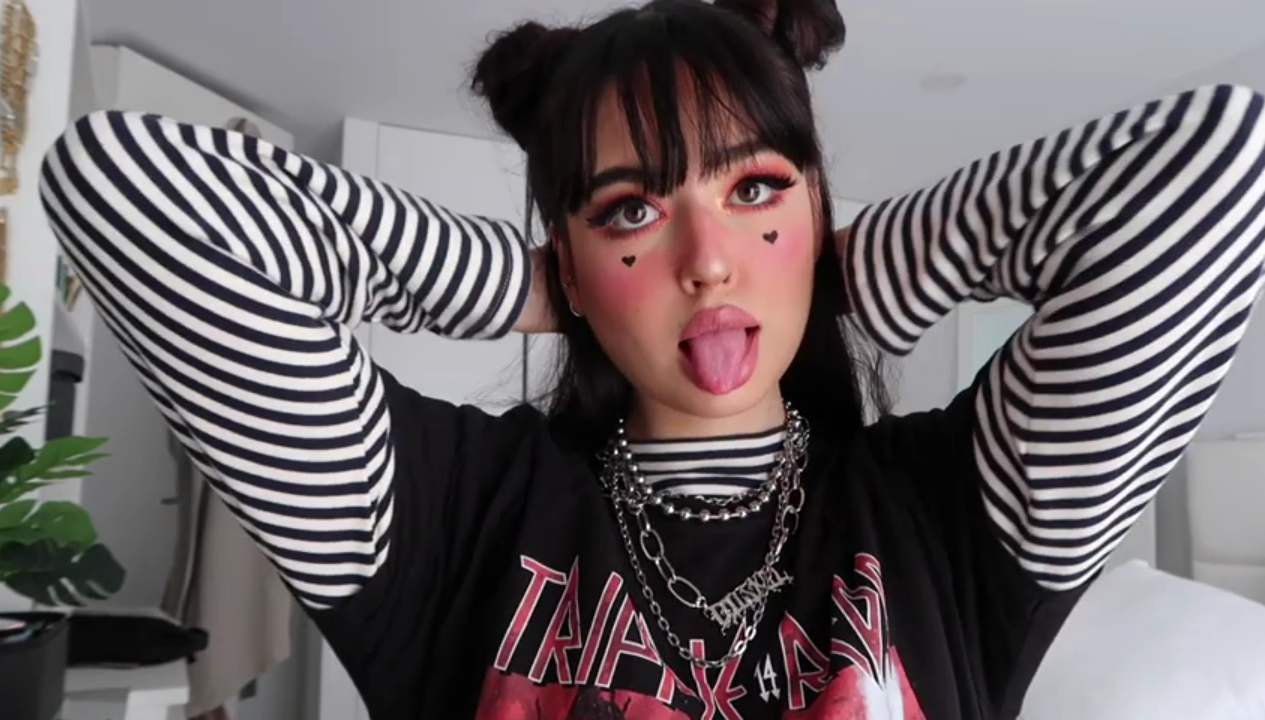
An E-girl with typical fashion, makeup and gestures

By the late 2010s to early 2020s, platforms like Tumblr declined in popularity, giving way to TikTok and Instagram, where online aesthetics were now beginning to emerge from Generation Z. The popularity and proliferation of internet aesthetics in the early 2020s has been linked to the COVID-19 lockdowns. Aesthetics such as Cottagecore and Dark academia rose to prominence as lifestyle-centered communities. These were often tied to broader socio-cultural movements, such as a growing rejection of hustle culture and urban living. Other aesthetics such as Gorpcore, VSCO girl, Weirdcore, Kidcore, Webcore, 2020 Alt, and Goblincore also emerged in the 2020s. The indie sleaze aesthetic was coined in 2021 to describe a visual fashion style that was popular during the 2000s to early 2010s. Internet aesthetics have also been associated with wider fashion trends, such as the controversial Bimbocore. Some aesthetics, such as the Backrooms, were coined on 4chan, and led to the emergence of the liminal space aesthetic.

Many of these styles were catalogued and discussed on community-curated platforms such as the Aesthetics Wiki. Defined as a central hub for documenting 21st century internet-based visual aesthetics, fashion, styles, music and subcultures, Aesthetics Wiki has been described by The Atlantic as "a huge mall, a place to go shopping for a new set of characteristics and a firmer self-definition".

Additionally, internet aesthetics have been influential to the outgrowth of 21st century alternative music, digital art and youth subculture, influencing early 2020s online musical microgenres. Rolling Stone described the 2020s underground rap scene as "extremely online", while the influential fashion styles of artists associated with Playboi Carti's Opium record label who drew from punk and alternative fashion, have been described as "opiumcore", with the underground rap scene's internet-driven aesthetics being noted as influential to streetwear and high fashion.

== Related examples ==
=== Seapunk ===
Seapunk is a niche internet aesthetic that surfaced in the early 2010s, mixing aquatic themes like ocean waves, dolphins, and neon greens/blues with '90s cyber and rave culture elements. It influenced digital art, music visuals, and fashion, with the aesthetic being used by Azealia Banks and Rihanna briefly before fading in mainstream popularity.

=== Vaporwave ===
Vaporwave is an internet aesthetic and microgenre that emerged in the early 2010s, characterized by nostalgic 1980s and 1990s visuals, glitch art, pastel colors, and slowed-down, chopped-and-screwed samples of elevator music and smooth jazz. It critiques consumer capitalism and digital culture. Artists like Vektroid, Oneohtrix Point Never (Daniel Lopatin), and, later, rapper Yung Lean, helped popularize the genre and aesthetic.

=== E-girls and e-boys ===
E-girl and E-boy refer to internet youth subcultures and aesthetics popularized on TikTok and Instagram in the late 2010s, blending emo, goth, anime, and gamer culture. It is characterized by dyed hair, heavy eyeliner, striped shirts, and digital iconography like hearts and teardrops.

=== Weirdcore ===
Weirdcore (as well as its subsection dreamcore) is an internet aesthetic emerging in the late 2010s characterized by early internet nostalgia blended with surreal, unsettling, and dreamlike visuals. It commonly features distorted VHS-style glitches and eerie landscapes, and takes influence from the liminal space aesthetic. The style gained popularity through platforms like TikTok.

=== Cottagecore ===
Cottagecore is an internet aesthetic celebrating a romanticized, rural, pastoral lifestyle with soft, natural colors, floral patterns, and handmade crafts. It gained prominence on platforms like Tumblr and TikTok in the late 2010s and early 2020s, emphasizing sustainability and escapism from urban life.

=== Goblincore ===
Goblincore is an internet aesthetic and subculture inspired by the folklore of goblins, centered on the celebration of natural ecosystems usually considered less beautiful by conventional norms, such as soil, animals, and second-hand objects.

=== Dark academia ===
Dark academia is an internet aesthetic emerging in the mid-to-late 2010s, inspired by classic literature, academic settings, and Gothic architecture. It features muted earth tones, vintage fashion, and themes of intellectualism, melancholy, and existentialism. It was popularized through social media platforms like Tumblr and TikTok during the 2010s.

=== Kidcore ===
Kidcore is an internet aesthetic inspired by 1990s and early 2000s childhood nostalgia, featuring bright primary colors, pixel art, and references to toys, cartoons, and playground culture. It became popular on Tumblr and TikTok, emphasizing innocence and whimsy.

=== Frutiger Aero ===
Frutiger Aero is an Internet aesthetic based on a design style that was prevalent from the mid-2000s to the early 2010s. It draws inspiration from past user interface designs rooted in skeuomorphism. The term was coined in 2017 by Sofi Xian of the Consumer Aesthetics Research Institute. Beginning in 2023, it gained significant traction and spread widely, driven by nostalgic Generation Z users on social media platforms such as TikTok.

=== Internet Awesomesauce ===
Internet Awesomesauce is an internet aesthetic of childish, chaotic, surreal, and absurd visuals. It consists of vibrant compositions such as cats, rainbows, lasers, and unicorns.

=== Older Brother Core ===
Older Brother Core is an internet aesthetic that romanticizes rebellious "punk" teenage males from the 2000s. It consists of a range of visuals from the original Xbox, Monster Energy, and CDs.

== See also ==
- -core – Suffix used for aesthetics
- New Aesthetic – Artistic movement exploring the intersection of the digital and physical worlds
- Internet culture – Culture that has emerged from the use of computer networks
- Internet music – Music influenced by Internet culture
- Internet meme – Cultural item spread via the internet
- Microgenre – Specialized or niche genre
- Post-Internet – 21st century art movement
- Internet art – Form of art distributed on the Internet
- Consumer Aesthetics Research Institute – Online community
- Net.art – Group of artists that use the Internet as their medium
- New media art – Artworks designed and produced by means of electronic media technologies
- Digital art – Art created digitally with a computer
- Aesthetic Research Centre – Publisher
- Institute of Aesthetic Research – Mexican art research community
- Internet cinema – 2020s Internet aesthetic and artistic movement
- Cringe culture – Culture of mocking embarrassing content
- Visual kei – Category of Japanese musicians

== Bibliography ==
- Kemper, Jakko (2023). Frictionlessness: The Silicon Valley Philosophy of Seamless Technology and the Aesthetic Value of Imperfection (ebook). Bloomsbury Academic. ISBN 979-8765104453.
