= Kidcore =

90s–2000s childhood nostalgia aesthetic

Kidcore is an Internet aesthetic inspired by 1990s and early 2000s childhood nostalgia, featuring bright primary colors, pixel art, and references to toys, cartoons, and playground culture.

== Characteristics ==
=== Visual themes and iconography ===
Kidcore uses a wide range of rainbow colours to highlight its use of nostalgia, specifically the 90s-2000s era. The visual language often uses artifacts of the late 20th-century to the early 21st century, including retro flowers, checkerboards and smiley faces. Kidcore can also include pastels.

=== Fashion and material culture ===
Kidcore fashion often focuses on culturally significant childhood memories, RUSSH reports that this often includes things like oversized clothes, cartoon graphic tees and tie dye clothes. It also uses elements of Y2K for its fashion culture. The aesthetic also extends to footwear and accessories. This is often shown through retro items like graphic t-shirts, denim overalls, suspenders, puffy sleeves, sticker-adorned jeans, high-tops and knee-high striped socks. Luxury and contemporary fashion designers integrate these elements to the runway.

=== Cultural and psychological drivers ===
Kidcore often shifts to nostalgia of popular culture, especially during the 90s. Behavioural scientist Patrick Fagan reported that "[t]here's a big psychological shift toward nostalgia, and it tends to intensify during chaotic or turbulent times," and "[r]ight now, things are particularly stressful, so people want to escape into childhood." The COVID-19 pandemic is also commonly attributed to the rise of ongoing fashion and cultural trends of Kidcore.

== History ==
The term "Kidcore" was first dated to be used in the early 2010s by fashion bloggers and enthusiasts. The trend became popular in late 2020, extending to the 2020s, with Nylon reporting a 2,439% jump in searches for the term on Etsy in three months ending September 2020 and 6 times increase for ‘butterfly eye makeup’.

== Related aesthetics ==
Kidcore is often seen as related to Clowncore, an aesthetic that revolves around similar elements. It also uses many elements of the Y2K aesthetic, with both being trends at similar times.
