= EDITED (company) =

British retail intelligence company

- Industry: Software
- Founded: 2009 in London, England
- Founders: Geoff Watts, Julia Fowler
- Number of locations: London, New York City
- Area served: Worldwide
- Services: Retail Analytics
- Number of employees: 110 (2018)
- Website: edited.com

EDITED (formerly EDITD) is an AI retail intelligence platform company headquartered in London, England with offices worldwide. The company produces real-time data analytics software intended for brands and retailers. Its products range across Market Intelligence to monitor the retail market worldwide for apparel, homeware and beauty products; Enterprise Intelligence, physical stores and omnichannel and Automation that combines signals from Market and Enterprise Intelligence. Its software is primarily used by apparel buyers and merchandisers.

== About ==
EDITED is an AI Retail Intelligence Platform that is designed to help retailers and brands make smarter decisions. The platform uses web crawlers and Artificial Intelligence technology to collect product and commercial data on over 5+ billion SKUs across 90,000 brands generated by the online retail industry. EDITED’s Retail Intelligence Platform is an intuitive solution that connects three key data sources, company, competitor, and customer. Some key components of the software are its ability to display product metrics for retail products currently on the market, including items’ pricing, discounting and sell out rates. In addition, the retail intelligence platform lets its users evaluate competitor assortment, pricing, discounting and site merchandising. Real-time data can help retailers decide which items to discount and how to set dynamic prices.

Since its acquisition of DynamicAction, an internal retail analytics company, the EDITED product family includes an Enterprise Intelligence component, which connects 150+ enterprise and cloud data systems.

EDITED was founded by Geoff Watts and Julia Fowler in 2009. The company is backed by Wavecrest Growth Partners, Beringea UK and Hermes GPE. It has raised $34 million.

In 2012, the company was featured in The Guardian’s list of ‘East London’s 20 Hottest Tech Startups’. In April, 2015 it was included on Business Insider’s list of ‘25 Companies That Are Revolutionizing Retail’. The company also placed third in Fast Company’s 2014 list of ‘The World’s Top 10 Most Innovative Companies in Style’.

In 2017, it won Retail Week's Retail Tech Supplier of the Year, and was ranked one of the Five Best Companies to Work for in Europe by Meritocracy.

In 2021, EDITED acquired retail analytics company, DynamicAction.

In 2026 EDITED launched a new product direction & AI+ capabilities
