= Gorpcore =

Fashion trend

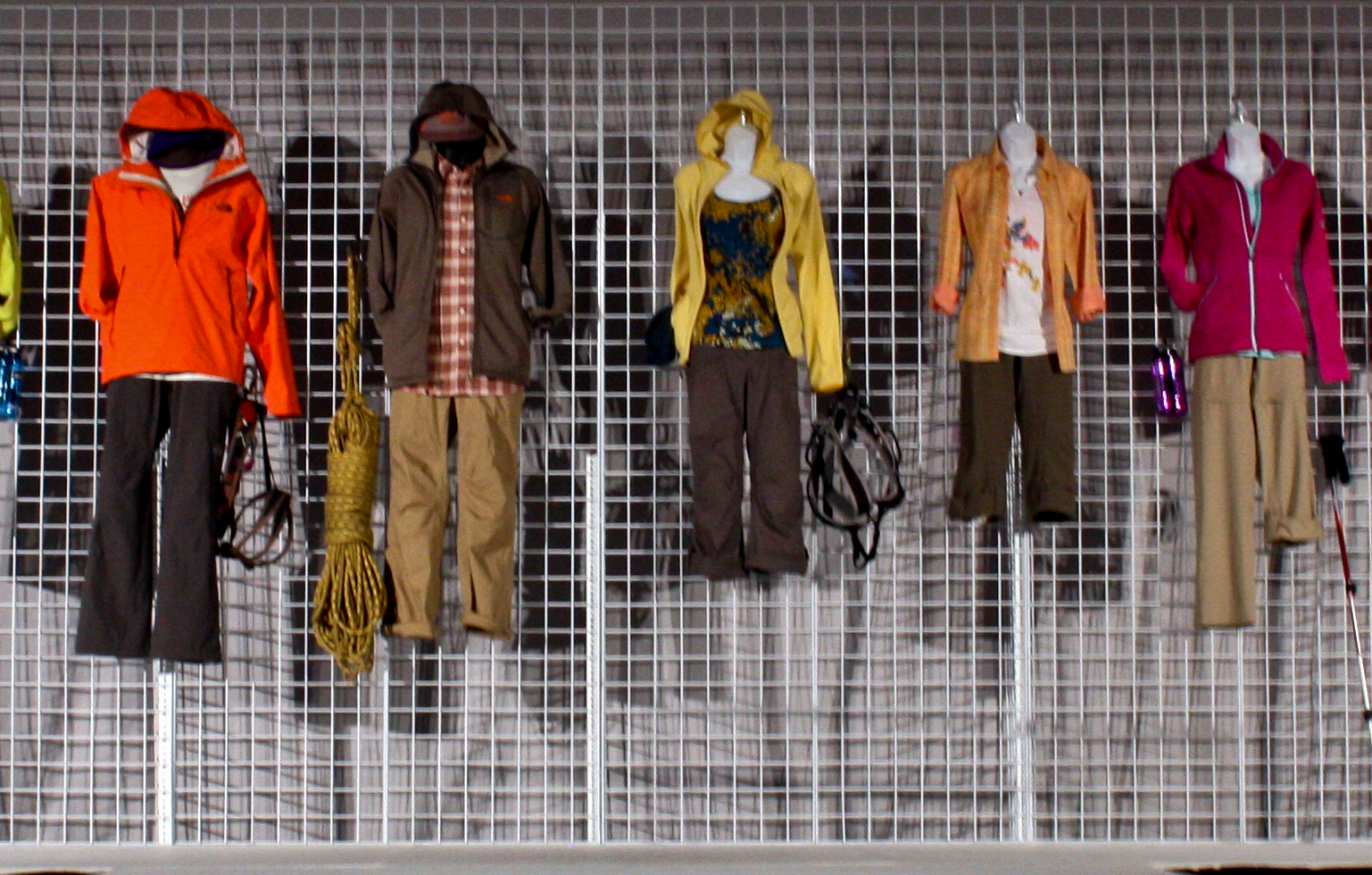
Examples of clothing from the North Face, a brand commonly cited as being popularised by the gorpcore trend

Gorpcore is a fashion trend in which outerwear typically designed for outdoor recreation is worn as streetwear. It has been described as "wearing functional outdoor wear in an urban, trendy style". This includes technical garments such as puffer jackets, hiking boots and fleeces, and brands such as The North Face, Patagonia and Arc'teryx. While the trend has a practical basis, it has also been embraced for its stylish appeal, with celebrities incorporating outdoor gear into everyday outfits. Coined in 2017, gorpcore emerged as a popular trend in the 2020s; some analysts suggest that the COVID-19 pandemic in part influenced this.

== Etymology ==
The term "gorpcore" was first introduced by writer Jason Chen in an article for New York magazine's fashion blog The Cut in 2017. The term derives from the term normcore and the popular hiking snack, gorp (possibly an acronym of "good ol' raisins and peanuts", or "granola, oatmeal, raisins, and peanuts" but likely a backronym). Initially, the term was used ironically to describe outdoor fashion that was seen as "defiantly ugly".

== History ==
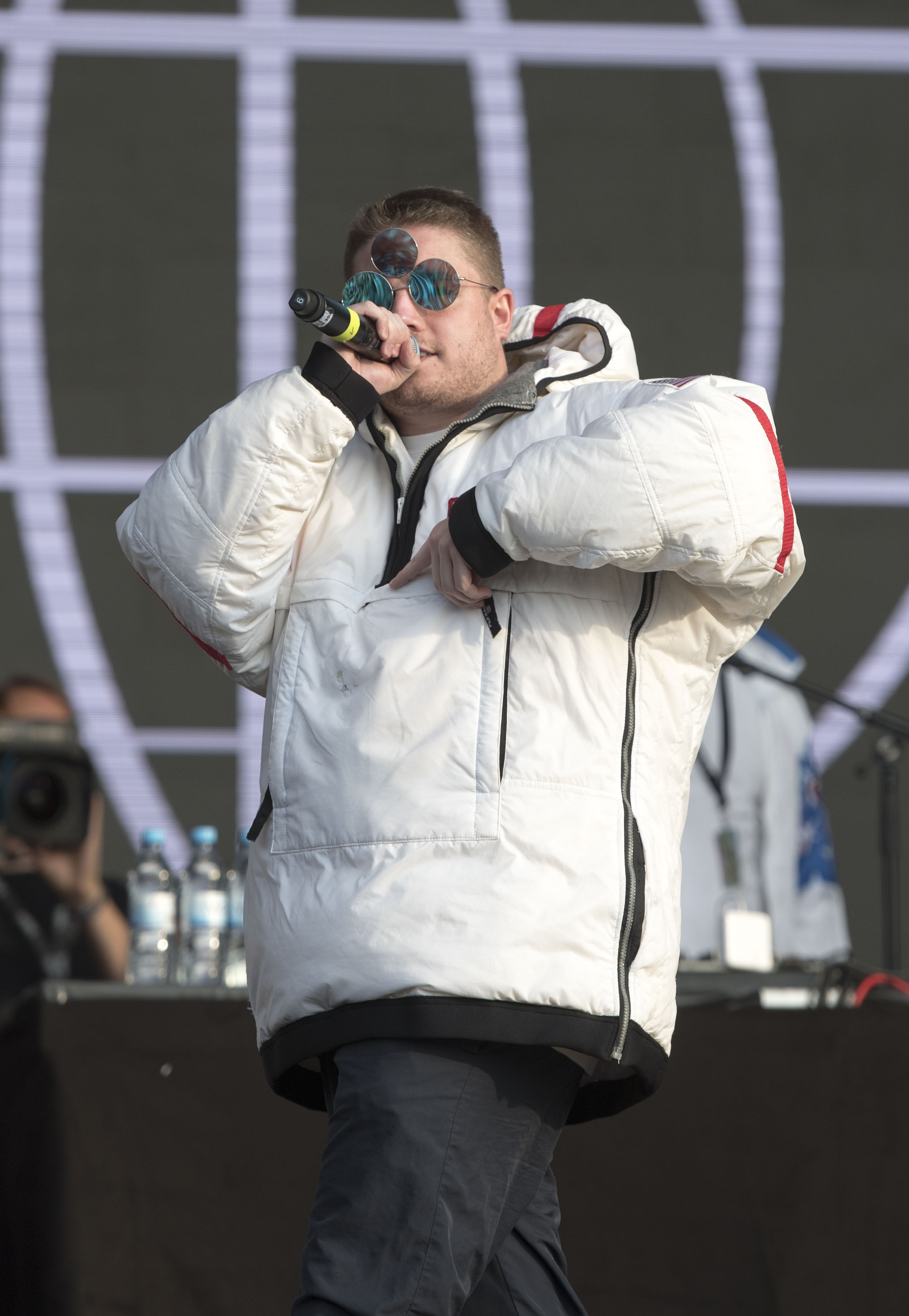
German rapper DCVDNS wearing a puffer jacket while performing at Splash! music festival

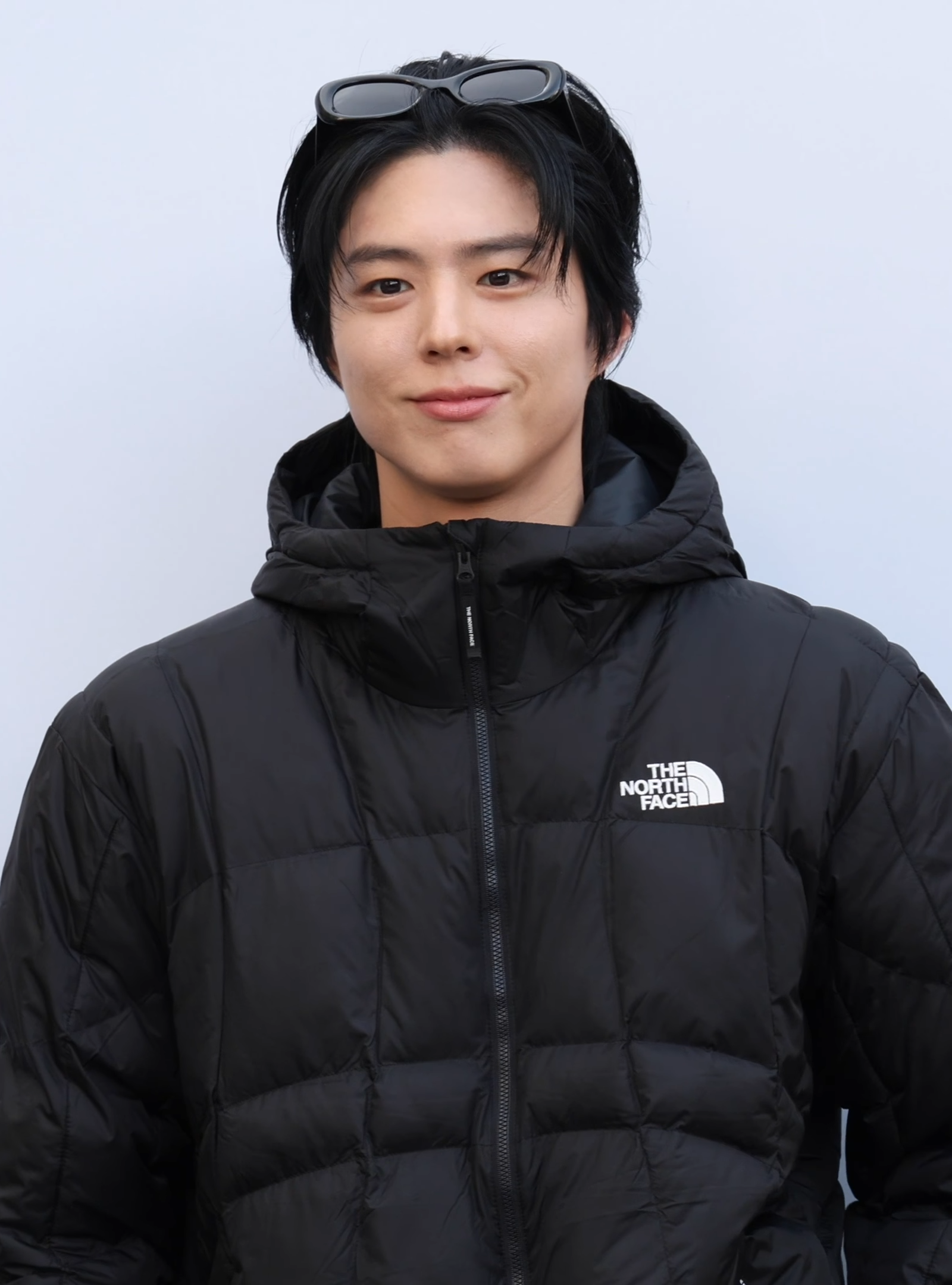
South Korean actor Park Bo-gum wearing a jacket from The North Face

Gorpcore initially referred to the emergence of stylish yet practical clothing, and was further popularized during the COVID-19 pandemic as people were drawn to outdoor activities. The trend led to a surge in sales for outdoor gear such as puffer jackets and hiking boots. Some fashion experts believe the trend started well before the pandemic, thanks to celebrities like A$AP Rocky and Frank Ocean wearing hiking-inspired clothing. Furthermore, certain outdoor brands such as Timberland have long been considered fashionable within various subcultures, such as the hip-hop subculture. High-end fashion brands such as Gucci and Moncler have also contributed to the trend with collaborations featuring functional yet fashionable designs, such as Gucci and the North Face's collaboration announced in September 2021. Outdoor gear brands like Patagonia, Columbia, Mammut, and Arc’teryx have also benefited from the trend, with celebrities such as Frank Ocean, Hailey Bieber, Kendall Jenner and Bella Hadid seen wearing their products at fashion shows as well as in everyday settings. Gorpcore was a dominant trend in 2023, with fashion experts predicting its longevity and evolution.

The essence of gorpcore fashion is centered on incorporating hiking-themed and mountainwear clothing items such as cargo pants, hiking boots, items lined with Gore-Tex, technical puffer jackets, fleeces, and other outdoor garments. Accessories often include functional fanny packs and crossbody bags, minimal jewelry, and sporty sunglasses. Although the trend typically leans towards looser fits, it allows for customization and versatility. Color schemes are usually either nature-inspired and earthy or bright and bold. Trousers often have many pockets or details.

Popular brands associated with gorpcore fashion include Patagonia, Hoka, Teva, The North Face, REI, Arc’teryx, Black Crows Skis, Columbia, Salomon, 66North, Outdoor Voices, Urban Outfitters, and Free People. The demand for the fashion aesthetic has led to a series of new collaborations among fashion and outdoor brands like The North Face and Supreme, Fjällräven and Acne Studios, and Reformation and Canada Goose. Cult brand Sandy Liang frequently incorporates gorpcore elements, such as in their first viral release, a fleece inspired by grandmothers in Chinatown. According to Angela Wei of Fashionista.com, "Essentially, gorpcore became the new luxury streetwear", which has become apparent in the launch of items like the Jacquemus hiking boots the Dior x Birkenstock collaboration, and Prada's popular nylon accessories.

Gorpcore's appeal has been attributed to its combination of functionality and effortless style as well its association with activities like skiing and hiking that are often considered exclusive to the wealthy. The trend's accessibility through second-hand and timeless pieces makes it alluring to a mainstream audience. Gorpcore is seen as a form of investment dressing that remains practical even as styles evolve. It also provides a sense of comfort and adventure to its wearers by being prepared for the elements, making it an attractive escape from reality.

In South Korea, the style of "Gore-Tex jackets and hiking boots" was associated with the clothes middle-aged men and neighborhood uncles (ajussi) wear "for work, dining and socializing".

== See also ==
- Athleisure
- Internet aesthetic
- Normcore
- Sportswear (fashion)
- Surfwear
- Techwear
