= Aesthetic Research Centre =

Publisher

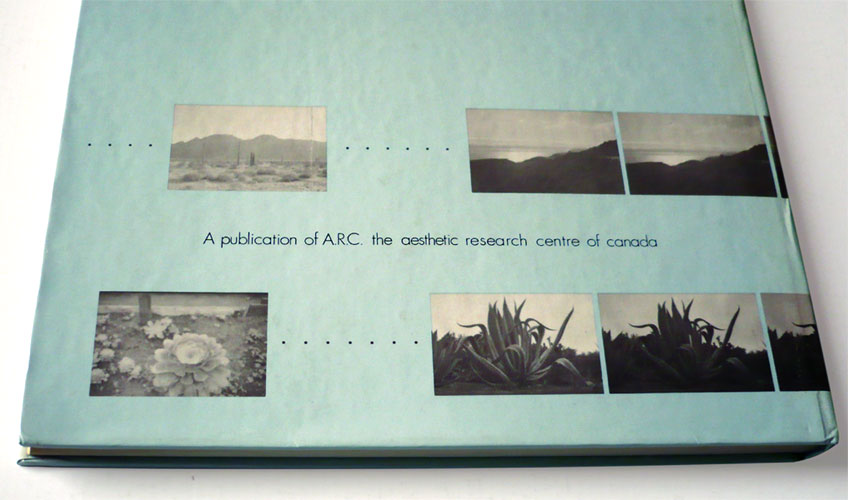
- Back cover of Michael Byron's Pieces: An Anthology
- Parent company: A.R.C. Publications
- Status: defunct (1977)
- Founded: 1971
- Founder: John Grayson
- Headquarters location: A.R.C. Publications, Vancouver, Canada
- Nonfiction topics: sound sculpture, avant-garde music, process music, neurofeedback

The Aesthetic Research Centre (A.R.C.) was a Canadian publisher of academic books, scientific journals, LP recordings and graphic scores in the field of sound sculpture, avant-garde music and process music, as well as neurofeedback in the arts.

== History ==
A.R.C. Publications was founded in Vancouver by John Grayson in the early 1970s and was active between 1971 and 1977. Born in Windsor, Ontario in 1943, Grayson was a Canadian instrument builder and sound sculptor also working as a lecturer at Toronto's York University, TV producer, exhibition curator and music educator – conducting workshops with children, for instance. In the Sounds of Sound Sculpture book, Grayson presented himself as "a sound sculptor, university lecturer, experimental theatre producer and farmer".

Grayson was the A.R.C.'s chief editor with a board of advisors including Grayson's wife Joan Costello, Stuart Calder – an educator working with disabled children at University of British Columbia, as well as American writers and composers Michael Byron (b. 1953) and David Rosenboom (b. 1947). The latter was professor at Toronto's York University Department of Music in the 1970s, and, with Byron, was the editor of the Journal of Experimental Aesthetics (J.E.A.) they founded in Vancouver in 1974 and subsequently published by A.R.C. from 1976.

== Publications ==
Though the A.R.C.'s output is small (5 books and 3 LPs, several issues of J.E.A.), a number of their releases proved influential and groundbreaking.

- The Sounds of Sound Sculpture: First conceived as an exhibition curated by John Grayson in 1975 and subsequently published as a book and LP by A.R.C. Publications in 1975, the Sounds of Sound Sculpture was the first of its kind to examine sound sculpture as an art form and to propose a history of the genre, list current practitioners ca.1975 and to foresee a future for the genre as an art practice and educational tool. A pioneering work, the project included French instrument builders the Baschet Brothers, Stephan Von Huene, Harry Bertoia's neatly designed resonant steel rods, Harry Partch instruments as well as other US and Canadian artists like David Jacobs, Reinhold Marxhausen, William Colvig or Ivor Darreg.
- Pieces: An Anthology: A pupil of James Tenney at CalArts, Michael Byron self-published the first volume of the historical Pieces: An Anthology series in 1976, a collection of process music and graphic scores by contemporary composers including Robert Ashley, Philip Corner, Alvin Lucier, Frederic Rzewski, Richard Teitelbaum, Alvin Curran, Paul Dresher, Peter Garland, Malcolm Goldstein, Daniel Goode, Dick Higgins or James Tenney, among others. This inaugural, soft-cover edition was reissued by A.R.C. in a hard-cover, revised edition in 1976, while Byron self-published 2 additional volumes in 1976 and 1977.
- Biofeedback and The Arts & Brainwave Music: Inspired by the work of neuroscientist Dr. E. Roy John and Manfred Clynes, and the use of brainwaves to generate music by Alvin Lucier in 1965 (Music for Solo Performer), Rosenboom founded the Laboratory of Experimental Aesthetics in 1972 as a division of York University's Faculty of Fine Arts in Toronto. From the start, Rosenboom and Grayson considered the Laboratory as an integral part of the Aesthetic Research Centre. Through the exploration of EEG signals (Electroencephalography) and cybernetic biofeedback systems, Rosenboom and visiting artists like John Cage, David Behrman, LaMonte Young and Marian Zazeela were able to develop artistic projects involving brain waves triggering sound devices via electric sensors. Rosenboom's Brainwave Music LP, published by A.R.C. in 1974, used biofeedback to produce original music, while his book Biofeedback and The Arts: Results of Early Experiments summed up the investigations of the Laboratory of Experimental Aesthetics.

== List of A.R.C. publications ==
1971

- Avenues to Higher Levels or Psychic Communication and Neurological Referencing: An Outline or Recent Developments in the Fine Arts, John Grayson. (book)

1974

- Brainwave Music, David Rosenboom. (LP)

1975

- The Sounds of Sound Sculpture, John Grayson ed. (book) ISBN 0-88985-000-3
- Biofeedback and The Arts: Results of Early Experiments, David Rosenboom ed. (book)
- The Sounds of Sound Sculpture, John Grayson ed. (LP)
- Suitable for Framing, David Rosenboom & J.B. Floyd. (LP)

1976

- Pieces: An Anthology, Michael Byron. (hard-cover, revised second edition, book)
- Desert Plants: Conversations with 23 American Musicians, Walter Zimmermann. (book)
- Environments of Musical Sculpture You Can Build, John Grayson ed. (book)

1976–1977

- Journal of Experimental Aesthetics, David Rosenboom ed.
