= Weirdcore =

Liminal Internet aesthetic

An example of a Weirdcore imagery showing unnerving text and an older-looking style

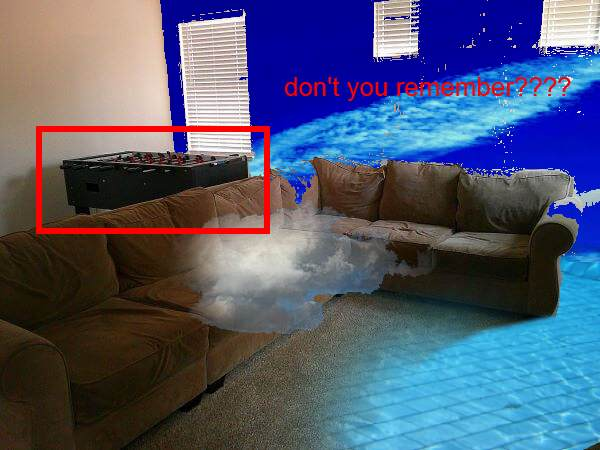
Another Weirdcore image showing nonsensical imagery and unnerving text

Weirdcore, also known as Oddcore, Strangecore, or Creepycore, is an Internet aesthetic-native microgenre and experimental electronic style popularized in the early 2020s centered around liminal spaces, low-quality photos, surreal messages, nostalgia, and psychological discomfort. The aesthetic is often characterized by unusual or unsettling texts and phrases, blacked boxes, eyes, mouths, TV heads, and nostalgic images. Often linked with related aesthetics like Liminalcore, Dreamcore, and The Backrooms, the aesthetic utilizes nostalgia through images that evoke distant memories or anemoia.

== Characteristics ==
Weirdcore encompasses a wide variety of visual elements and defining features; The Guardian's Lauren Cochrane described it as an "anything-goes" aesthetic. Often built around an "anti-design" concept, Weirdcore invokes feelings often associated with loneliness and isolation. Its visuals are "influenced by the general look and feel of images shared on an older internet" and frequently feature digitally modified images and lo-fi photos. The aesthetic may also include "fragmented and abrupt visual transitions".

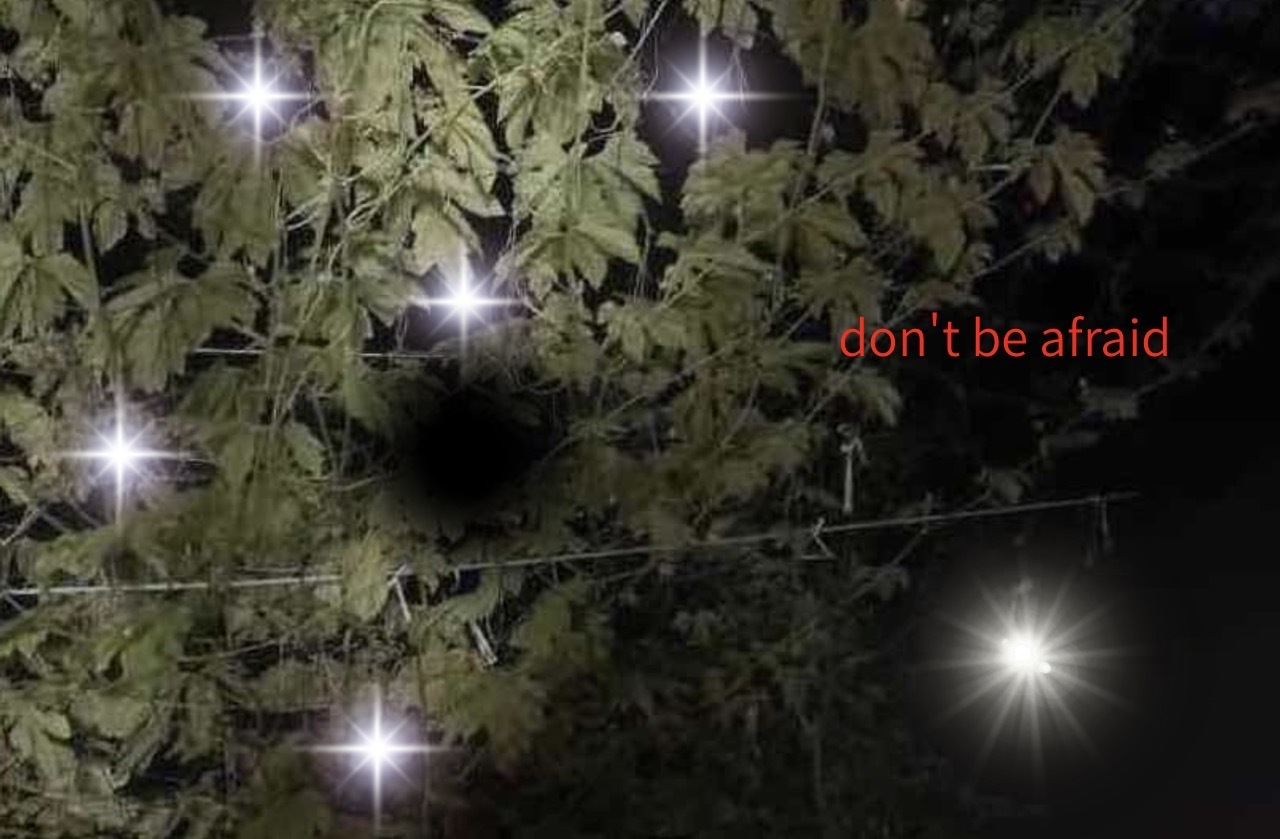
An example of Weirdcore imagery featuring low-quality photography and unsettling text

- Discomforting text: Weirdcore pictures often have red text that look out of place and discomforting. These text boxes contain psychologically unsettling sentences such as "are you lost?" and "nothing is real" that invoke uncanny and existential thoughts into the viewer.
- Black rectangles: Black rectangular-shaped voids are often found in many Weirdcore photographs and videos. They often contain discomforting text inside them, as they intensify the unsettling feelings derived from reading the text.
- Eyes and mouths: Distorted and uncanny eyeballs and mouths are often found within Weirdcore photos, with many being inside angel wings, on clouds, or in the darkness. These give the viewers a constant, paranoid feeling that they're constantly being watched.
- Humanoid figures: Weirdcore imagery frequently contains humanoid shadowlike human silhouettes, faceless figures, or other indistinct human forms that are often placed within confined or liminal environments.
- Nostalgic images: The setting and background for the majority of Weirdcore images have nostalgic or anemoaic elements. These images use locations that may be familiar to the viewer's childhood, like playgrounds, classrooms, and malls, and they are usually empty, devoid of humans or life. These spaces are used as a base for Weirdcore edits.

== Music ==
Weirdcore music shares a common characteristic of off-putting music that gives the listener an uneasy feeling and an emotional vulnerability. These pieces have common themes of strange lyrics (or none at all) along with several lo-fi background parts. Common songs include:

1. Songs from Everywhere at the End of Time
2. Video game songs like "Fallen Down" and "Lost Woods"
3. 7 Weeks & 3 Days
4. Homage
5. Hey Kids
6. Numbers
7. Six Forty Seven
8. I'd Rather Sleep
9. Comfort chain
10. Warm Nights

== In media ==
Video games cited as influential to the Weirdcore aesthetic include Yume Nikki and LSD: Dream Emulator.

Director Kyle Edward Ball said that, while developing his 2022 horror film Skinamarink, he looked at online communities including r/Liminalspace and r/Weirdcore.
