= Goblincore =

Subculture and aesthetic centered around goblins

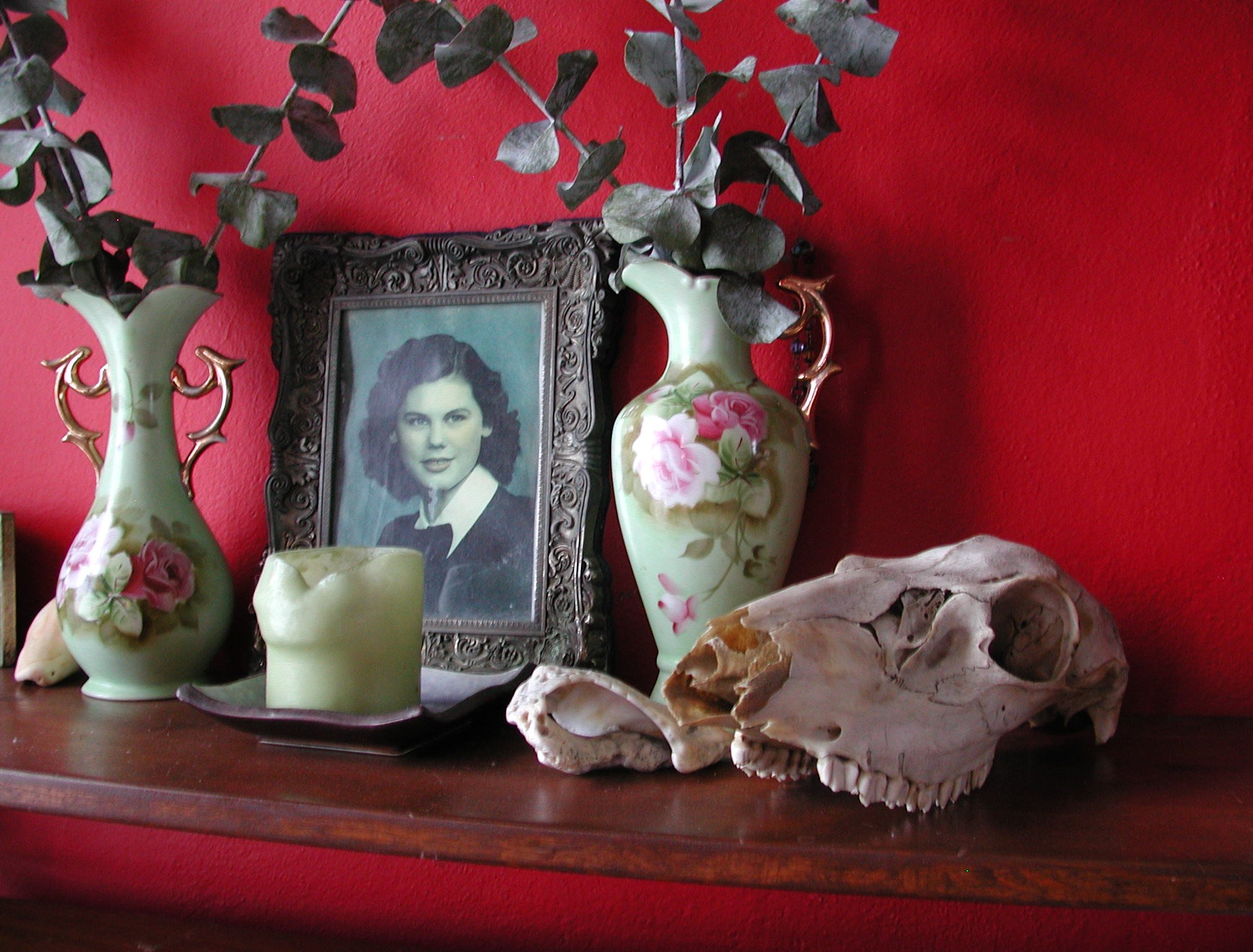
Plants, animal bones and second-hand objects are all parts of the goblincore aesthetic.

Goblincore is an internet aesthetic and subculture inspired by the folklore of goblins, centered on the celebration of natural ecosystems usually considered less beautiful by conventional norms, such as soil, animals, and second-hand objects.

== Aesthetic ==
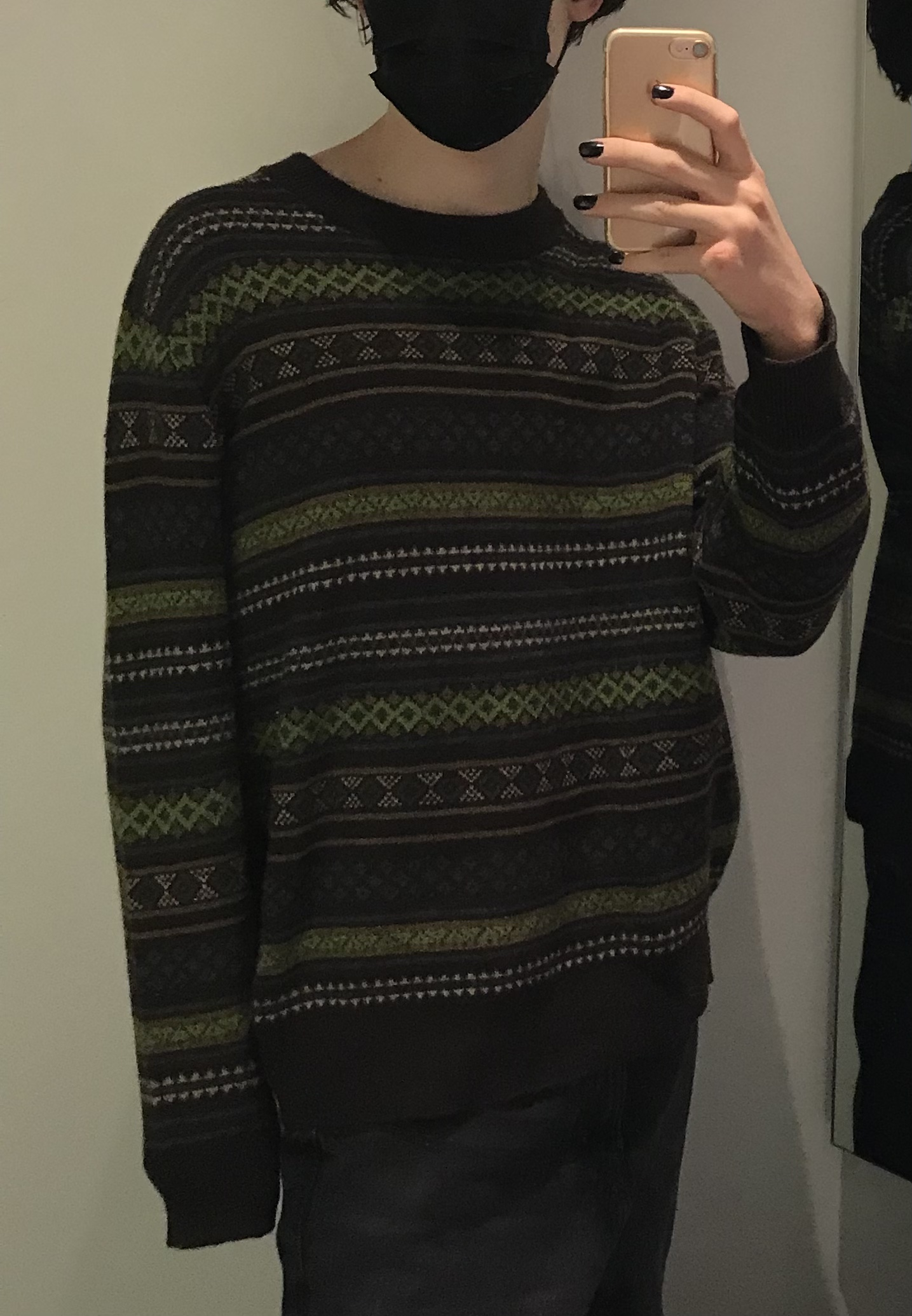
Goblincore sweater

Second-hand and thrifted clothing feature prominently in the fashion of goblincore, often emphasizing comfort and brown, green, and clashing colours. The aesthetic often features idealised imagery of natural creatures such as snakes, frogs, snails, and earthworms; animal skeletons and rocks; plants and fungi like ferns, moss, and mushrooms. Journalist Sabrina Faramarzi has stated that the subculture is about "chaos, dirt and mud."

Proponents of the subculture have also been noted to collect shiny objects, similarly to folklore goblins, such as silverware, small jewelry, and coins. The subculture has been described as connected to maximalism and escapism.

Alternative names also used for the subculture include crowcore, dirtcore, cottagegoth, feralcore, gremlincore, and mushroomcore.

== History ==
Goblincore is believed to have surfaced in online communities in the late 2010s, particularly on Tumblr and TikTok, with Amanda Brennan stating that it "started picking up in spring 2019 and hit full steam in 2020 as people stumbled upon it during the pandemic." As of July 2021, the goblincore subreddit had 19 000 subscribers, an increase of 395% from July 2020. E-commerce company Etsy reported a 695% increase in searches related to goblincore in June 2021.

== Reception ==
The subculture has been described as anti-consumerist, with Mashable writer Morgan Sung stating that "in a maximalist goblincore home, decor is found or built, not bought." It has also been noted as having a significant number of LGBT+, and specifically non-binary, proponents, with a common catchphrase being "no gender, only bugs".

Some have described the subculture as a darker companion to cottagecore, with Faramarzi stating that "goblincore is cottagecore for those that actually spend time in nature, who know that nature is not sunlit wheat fields but gnarly forests and chaotic animals".

== See also ==
- Counterculture of the 1960s
- Deep ecology
- Found object
- Goth subculture
- Permaculture
- Goblin mode
- Whimsigoth
