= Normcore =

Clothing style

Normcore is a unisex fashion trend characterized by unpretentious, average-looking clothing. Normcore fashion includes jeans, T-shirts, sweats, button-downs, and sneakers.

== History ==
The word "normcore" first appeared in a 2008 guest strip by Ryan Estrada for the webcomic Templar, Arizona.

In 2013, the word was employed by trend forecasting group K-HOLE in a report titled "Youth Mode: A Report on Freedom". As used by K-HOLE, the word referred to an attitude, not a code of dress. It was intended to mean "finding liberation in being nothing special".

In 2014, an article in New York magazine by author Fiona Duncan conflated normcore with what K-HOLE referred to as "ActingBasic", a concept which involved dressing neutrally to avoid standing out. It was this misunderstanding of normcore that gained popular usage. That same year, "normcore" was named runner-up for neologism of the year by the Oxford University Press.

In 2016, the word was added to the AP Stylebook.

== Fashion ==
Normcore wearers are people who do not wish to distinguish themselves from others by their clothing. This does not mean that they are unfashionable people who wear whatever is easiest, but rather that they consciously choose clothes that are functional and undistinguished. The "normcore" trend has been interpreted as a reaction to ever-changing fashion trends, as normcore clothes are generally seen as timeless and unaffected by trends. Normcore clothes are unisex and are usually casual items such as hoodies, T-shirts, polo shirts, short-sleeved buttoned shirts, sweatpants, chinos, jeans, shorts, and sneakers; items such as suit jackets, ties, blouses, boots, and dress shoes are avoided.

The characters featured on the sitcom Seinfeld (1989–1998) are frequently cited as exemplifying the aesthetics and ethos of normcore fashion. Clothes that meet the "normcore" description are mainly sold by large fashion and retail chains such as The Gap, Jack & Jones, Uniqlo, Jigsaw, and Esprit. Many other retailers such as Marc O'Polo, Woolrich, Desigual, Closed, and Scotch & Soda produce normcore-like clothes combined with individual design ideas.

== Menocore ==
A variation on this concept for women has been called "menocore" from menopause. It is loose and comfortable clothing, usually in light or neutral colors, that fits a variety of informal social situations. The style suggests that the wearer is mature, self-confident, and not seeking attention from men. Designer brands associated with this style of dress include Eileen Fisher, J. Jill, and Donna Karan.

Columnist Sara Tatyana Bernstein has said that the style suggests that the wearer has leisure time and wealth, giving it class connotations, and that it can be stereotyped as the style of a woman who is middle-aged or older and already wealthy enough that she does not need the kind of job that would require more formal clothing. The style may also be adopted by women outside the stereotype as an aspirational style to suggest that they wish to eventually attain the financial security, leisure, and other lifestyle elements available to older and wealthier women.

== See also ==
- Anti-fashion
- Plain dress
