= Bundesverband Junger Unternehmer =

Die Jungen Unternehmer
- Abbreviation: BJU
- Formation: 1950
- Type: Business association
- Headquarters: Berlin
- Vorstand: Hubertus Porschen
- Website: www.junge-unternehmer.eu

Die Jungen Unternehmer (BJU) is the German Federal Association of Young Entrepreneurs, created in 1950 for the protection and promotion of the interests for young family businesses and owner entrepreneurs up to 40 years of age.

Members of the BJU must be owners or partners of an officially registered enterprise in Germany employing at least 10 persons, or having an annual turnover of at least one million Euros.

It is currently lobbying against the German government policy relating to the Euro by what it calls a widespread protest against umbrella protection policies. The BJU was founded in 1950 and had 1500 members in 2014. The chairman of the association is Hubertus Porschen.
