= Material Design =

Design language developed by Google

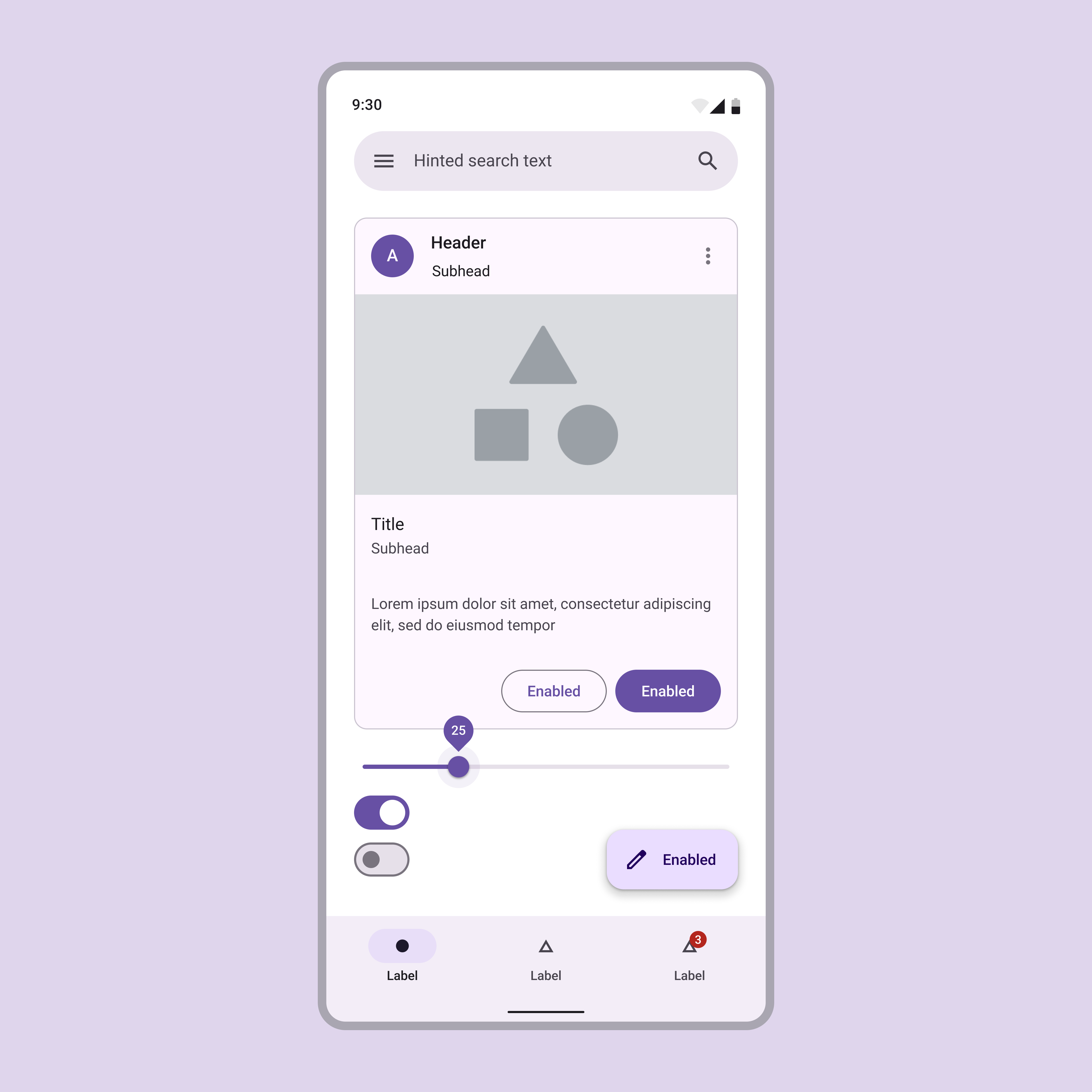
- Screenshot Material Design 3 on Android 12
- Developer: Google
- Release: June 25, 2014; 12 years ago
Release(s)
Stable release(s) [±]
- Android: 1.12.0 / 2 May 2024; 2 years ago
- iOS (discontinued): 124.2.0 / 26 April 2021; 5 years ago
- Web (discontinued): 14.0.0 / 28 April 2022; 4 years ago
Preview release(s) [±]
- Written in: HTML, CSS, Sass (v4), JavaScript, AngularJS, Angular, Java, Objective-C, Swift, Dart
- Platform: Android, iOS, Web
- Type: Design language
- License: Android, iOS: Apache-2.0 License; Flutter: BSD-3-Clause License; Web: MIT License
- Website: Latest Version: Material Design 3; Archived Versions: Material Design 1; Material Design 2
- Repository: Web: material-components-web; Android: material-components-android; iOS: material-components-ios; Flutter: material-components-flutter

Material Design (codenamed Quantum Paper) is a design language developed by Google in 2014. Expanding on the "cards" UI that debuted in Google Now, Material Design uses more grid-based layouts, responsive animations and transitions, padding, and depth effects such as lighting and shadows. Google announced the initial version of Material Design on June 25, 2014, at the 2014 Google I/O conference.

The purpose of developing Material Design was to create a novel visual language, synthesizing the classic principles of good user interface design with the innovation and potential of technology and science. Head designer Matías Duarte explained that "unlike real paper, our digital material expands and reforms intelligently. Material has physical surfaces and edges. Seams and shadows provide meaning about what you can touch." Material Design is based on paper-and-ink and skeuomorphic interaction concepts, but its implementation is more advanced.

In 2021, Google revamped the design language, with the new language being titled Material You (Material Design 3). It provides more flexibility for designers to create custom themes with varying geometry, colors, and typography.

In 2025, the next evolution of the design language, titled "Material 3 Expressive", was unveiled.

== Implementation ==
Material Design has been gradually rolled out across Google's web and mobile products, providing a consistent experience across all platforms and applications. Google has also released application programming interfaces (APIs) for third-party developers to incorporate the design language into their applications.

The canonical open source implementation of Material Design for web application user interfaces is called Material Web. However, there are other official ways to do so, such as, for example, using Flutter or Jetpack Compose.

== Updates ==
Material Design 2 (2018)

Material Design 3 (2021)

=== Material Design 2 ===
After the 2018 revamp, Google began redesigning most of their apps based on an updated set of principles and guidelines dubbed "Material Design 2", which appeared on Android Pie. It provided a larger focus on customization of the basic Material Design components to adapt to the branding of the products in which it is being used. The updated guidelines further heavily emphasize white space, rounded corners, colorful icons, and bottom navigation bars. Google began utilizing a special size-optimized version of their proprietary Product Sans font called Google Sans.

=== Material Design 3 (Material You) ===
At Google I/O in May 2021, Google announced a new concept on Android 12 known as "Material You" (also known as "Material Design 3"), emphasizing increased animation, larger buttons, and the ability for custom UI themes to be generated from the user's wallpaper. Material You was gradually rolled out to various Google apps on older Android versions in the following months, and acted as a major focus on the Pixel 6 and Pixel 6 Pro smartphone series.

=== Material 3 Expressive ===
At The Android Show: I/O Edition in May 2025, Google announced "Material 3 Expressive" for Android 16 and Wear OS 6. This version of Material Design shares similarities with its predecessor, and includes improved animations and a more colorful and fun design. It was gradually rolled out to Pixel phones (Pixel 6 and newer) and the Pixel Tablet, beginning in September 2025.

== See also ==
- Flat design
- Fluent Design System
- Human interface guidelines
- Metro (design language)
- Corporate Memphis
- Liquid Glass
