= Glassmorphism =

Design style

Glassmorphism uses glassy layers with different levels of transparency and blur to create a sense of depth.

Glassmorphism is a design style characterized by the use of vibrant colors covered with glassy layers, semi-transparent panels, soft lighting, depth effects, and background blur. It has been described as a successor to, or evolution of, Neumorphism.

== Characteristics ==
Glassmorphism is defined by its glassy appearance, which is achieved through using a semi-transparent blur effect, rounded edges, and a thin outline, creating the impression of a glass edge surface. By varying the transparency intensity of multiple such glass surfaces, a sense of depth is created, resulting in surfaces with higher transparency appearing closer to users than those with a lower transparency level. Using distinct color gradients as a background enhance this sense of depth.

== History ==
The term "Glassmorphism" was coined by Michal Malewicz in 2020. Apple's macOS Big Sur, released in 2020, is an early example of an operating system that incorporated some glassmorphic elements. Microsoft's operating systems Windows Vista and Windows 7, which both used the Windows Aero design language, have been identified as precursors, using a glass-like appearance for their window borders and status bars. Glassmorphism uses many elements of the Frutiger Aero design style which was prevalent from the mid-2000s to early 2010s, including skeuomorphic elements and semi-realistic icons.

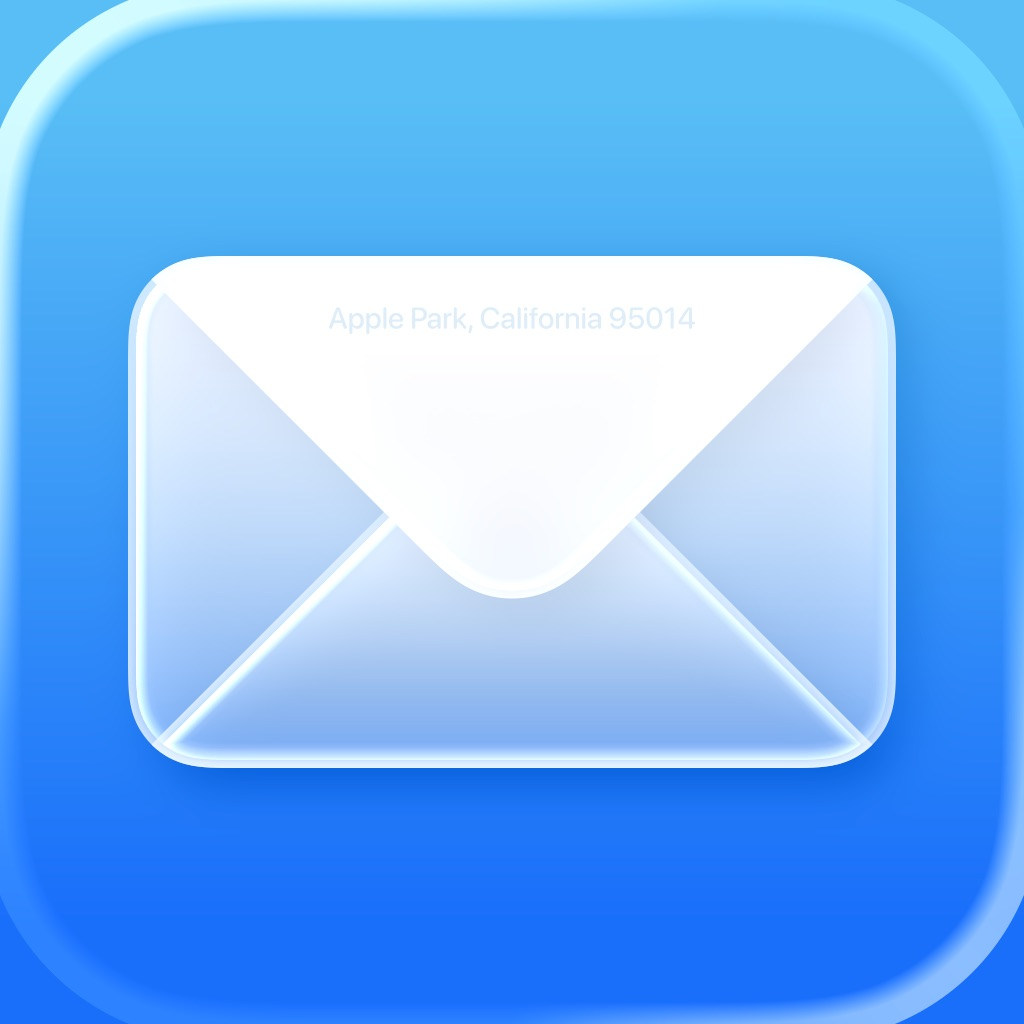
Comparison between Apple Mail's 2013 flat design icon (left) and 2025 Glassmorphic icon (right)

By the mid-2020s, Glassmorphism began to gradually replace flat design in interface design. In 2025 with iOS 26, Apple introduced its Liquid Glass design language, which features transparent elements and 3D effects, and has been described as a shift away from the flat design aesthetic introduced with iOS 7 in 2013. It is inspired by the user interface of the Apple Vision Pro and its visionOS operating system, released one year prior. Microsoft's video game brand Xbox replaced its flat, simplistic logo with a more shiny, translucent one in 2026. Also in 2026, Google released Android 17, which moves away from Android's flat, solid style toward a more translucent look with blurry elements. Huawei's HarmonyOS is another operating system that adopted translucent panels and frosted-glass effects in the mid-2020s. Samsung's One UI user interface also added Glassmorphic elements such as floating panels, softer visuals, and increased transparency with version 8.5's design overhaul in 2026.
