= Neumorphism =

UI design style

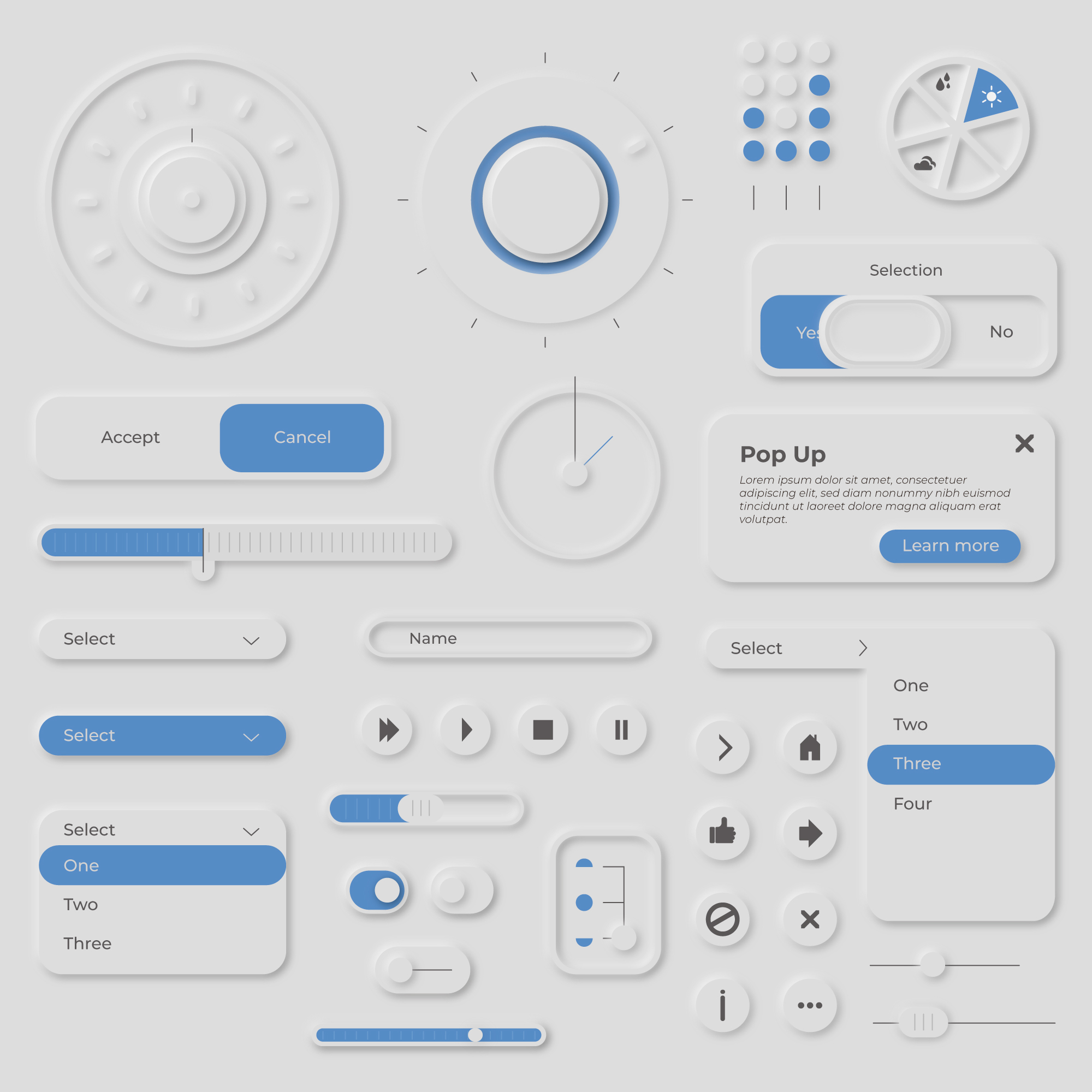
Examples of neumorphic user interface (UI) elements

Neumorphism is a design style used in graphical user interfaces. It is commonly identified by a soft and light look (for which it is sometimes referred to as soft UI) with elements that appear to protrude from or dent into the background rather than float on top of it. It is sometimes considered a medium between skeuomorphism and flat design.

== History ==
The term neumorphism was coined by Jason Kelly in 2019 as a portmanteau of neo and skeuomorphism, emphasizing its role as a semi-revival of skeuomorphism. Many neumorphic design concepts can be traced to Alexander Plyuto, who created a mockup for a banking app showing various elements of neumorphic design. He posted it to the website Dribbble, where it quickly blew up to 3,000 views.

Before the style gained widespread attention, proto-design elements resembling neumorphism and glassmorphism appeared in consumer products such as Huawei's HarmonyOS interface for the Honor Vision smart TV, launched in August 2019. The interface utilized homogeneous backgrounds with soft light and shadows to create a sense of depth, a concept recognized by the iF Design Award in 2020. This design language evolved into the HarmonyOS 2 Design System, which in 2021 received a Red Dot Design Award for its consistent, lively user interface across multiple devices. In 2026, the continued evolution of this design philosophy was recognized again when HarmonyOS received another iF Design Award for its "user-friendly UI experience" and "profound experience in the field of intelligent device interaction design."

On November 12, 2020, Apple released macOS Big Sur. The update included graphical designs that featured neumorphism prominently, such as the app icons and use of translucency, although Apple did not adopt neumorphism entirely.

== Characteristics and purpose ==
Neumorphism is a form of minimalism characterized by a soft and light look, often using pastel colors with low contrast. Elements are usually the same color as the background, and are only distinguished by shadows and highlights surrounding the element. This gives the elements the appearance that they are "protruding" from the background, or that they are dented into it.

Designers may like the look and feel of neumorphism because it provides a middle ground between skeuomorphism and flat design. Specifically, it aims to look plausibly realistic, while still looking clean and adhering to minimalism.

== Criticism ==
Neumorphism has received criticism from UI designers, notably for its lack of accessibility, difficulty in implementation, low contrast, and incompatibility with certain brands. Partly because of these accessibility issues, takeup of neumorphism by designers had quickly declined by 2021, and instead glassmorphism had emerged as a popular aesthetic in the early and mid-2020s.

== See also ==
- Aero (user interface)
- Aqua (user interface)
- Liquid Glass
