= City Art Search =

- City Art Search logo, resembling Grant Wood's American Gothic

- Original author: Brian Kernan
- Developer: Microsoft
- Release: November 3, 2014; 12 years ago
- Stable release: 8.0.9 / November 3, 2026; 1 day ago
- Platform: Windows 10, 11
- License: Proprietary freeware

City Art Search is an app developed by Microsoft that updates the Windows lock screen with selected artworks from around the world. It offers personalization features and allows users to search for artworks, which can also be displayed on an interactive map.

== Features ==
The app includes a robust search feature, allowing users to browse content by various criteria, such as: ancient civilization, continent, country, nationality, continentality, region, state, city, structure, palace, church, mosque, architect, artist, museum, gallery, artistic movement, group of paintings, painting, sculpture, statue, tag, and time period.

Additionally, users can add artworks to their favorites for quick access and play slideshows featuring random artworks. For personalized browsing, users have the option to exclude specific types of content, such as artworks depicting nudity, violence, religious themes, portraits, or buildings.

Where available, artworks include direct links to their corresponding Wikipedia articles, providing further context and information. Users can also customize the interval for refreshing artwork on their lock screens, specifying the number of minutes between each update.

As of 2025, City Art Search features a collection of 10,485 artworks, up from 8,000 in 2017.

== History ==
City Art Search was launched in 2014 for Windows 8.1 and Windows Phone 8.1. Although the app continues to receive updates, it has retained its original Metro interface since its initial release.
