= Liquid Glass =

Design language developed by Apple

- The Liquid Glass design on iOS 27 on an iPhone 17 Pro
- Developer: Apple
- Release: June 9, 2025; 17 months ago
- Stable release: 27.2.1 / November 9, 2026; 12 days ago
- Preview release: 27.3 Beta 1 / November 3, 2026; 18 days ago
- Operating system: iOS, iPadOS, macOS, tvOS, visionOS, watchOS
- Predecessor: Flat design
- Type: Design language
- Website: developer.apple.com/documentation/technologyoverviews/liquid-glass

Liquid Glass is a design language developed by Apple as a unified visual theme for the graphical user interfaces for its suite of operating systems. It was announced on June 9, 2025, at the Worldwide Developers Conference (WWDC). Liquid Glass features a fluid, dynamic glass-like interface that reflects and refracts the background. It was introduced in iOS 26, iPadOS 26, macOS Tahoe, tvOS 26, visionOS 26, and watchOS 26.

== Principles ==
Apple sought a new design language to unify the look and feel of interface elements across its devices, with their various window sizes and displays. The company decided to move away from the flat design cues popularized by Jony Ive in iOS 7 (2013) toward more expressive, skeuomorphic elements. It also decided to introduce a dynamic "material", a visual effect that provides a sense of depth and hierarchy between elements.

The "material" of Liquid Glass combines the "optical properties of glass with a sense of fluidity". It has translucent elements that adapt to their environment, refracting and reflecting elements placed behind them. Lighting and shaders are used to suggest clear or frosted glass; elements adapt to a light or dark appearance to make text and icons on top of the material legible. On iOS and iPadOS, elements react to the device's movement with animations that suggest the movement of a drop of liquid.

Apple's updated human interface guidelines say that apps made with Liquid Glass should show hierarchy between content and controls.

== Implementation ==
Liquid Glass overhauls existing iOS interface components such as text, sliders, toggles, alerts, panels, and sidebars. The material is integrated into various apps and system features such as the Dock, notifications, and Control Center; it can also be used by third-party apps.

App icons have been redesigned to use a layered system akin to the one used on visionOS and tvOS, applying translucency and a glass-like shimmer effect, which also reacts to device movement, while applying greater use of gradients. App icons can adopt a clear appearance that make them look transparent. Toolbars and other elements on-screen are no longer pinned to the device's bezels, but are separated into bubbles that appear and disappear based on the context. For example, the Music app's tab bar shrinks when scrolling. The new design also allows the material to change its shape and size, such as the text selection tooltip expanding to show all options in a vertical list.

Apple's senior vice president of software engineering, Craig Federighi, said designers used the company's industrial design studios to fabricate glass of various opacities and lensing properties, so they could closely match the interface properties to those of real glass. He also said Apple silicon provides the extra computational power required to run Liquid Glass.

In a video detailing the design change, Apple said the language was influenced by the Aqua design language of macOS, real-time Gaussian blurring in iOS 7, the motion in iPhone X, the Dynamic Island on the iPhone 14 Pro and later, and the glass-like UI of visionOS. Liquid Glass has strong influences from "glassmorphism", a design style that became popular in 2021 in part by Microsoft's Windows 11 and its use of Fluent Design as well as Apple's macOS Big Sur. Many critics and social media users noted similarities to Aqua and Windows Aero, including glass-like textures popularized by Windows Vista. TechRadar's Jamie Richards also wrote that Liquid Glass was likely influenced by Frutiger Aero.

== Reception ==
The same app icon in Apple software versions 26 and 27, rendered with the Icon Composer tool using default settings, in version 26 featuring prominent lighting from the top left corner, while in version 27 featuring subtler lighting coming from the top, and darkened side edges

Liquid Glass has received a generally mixed-to-negative response. Some reviewers praised its attempt to emulate the refractive and lensing qualities of real glass, describing the design as visually sophisticated. Critics described the interface as distracting and, in some cases, less usable. Designers interviewed by Wired said that the visual effects could draw attention away from app content and that smaller development teams might struggle with the increased design complexity. Other commentators argued that Liquid Glass departed from established user interface conventions in ways that could make macOS more difficult to navigate.

Legibility was a recurring concern. Some designers reported that transparency in certain interface elements made text harder to read, particularly in low-contrast conditions such as direct sunlight. Following feedback from the first developer beta, Apple made several adjustments intended to improve readability. These included increasing opacity in navigation bars and other user interface chrome, refining system overlays and modal backgrounds, and introducing additional controls for transparency in later builds.

At WWDC 2026, Apple announced a revamp to Liquid Glass for iOS 27, iPadOS 27, and macOS 27 Golden Gate to address criticism. The updated design reduced default transparency, changed the effect of the glass, changed sidebar corners on iPadOS and macOS, and revamped app icons to make them more recognizable. Apple also introduced a slider in each operating system's settings, allowing users to adjust the Liquid Glass interface's appearance along a spectrum from clear and transparent to tinted and frosted.

== See also ==
- Aqua (user interface)
- Fluent Design System
- Material Design
- Neumorphism
- Windows Aero
