= Fluent UI =

Fluent UI may refer to either Microsoft's older graphical user interface (GUI) or newer GUI design system:

- Fluent User Interface – a GUI introduced in Office 2007, which uses ribbons
- Fluent UI – the 2020 new name for UI Fabric of Microsoft's Fluent Design System
