= Fluent Design System =

Design system created by Microsoft in 2017

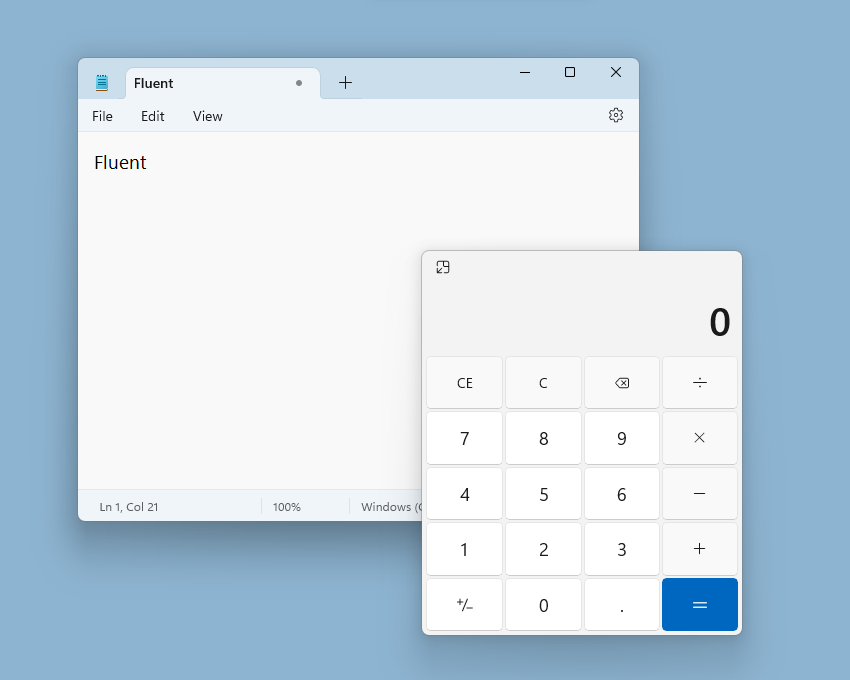
- The notepad and calculator application in Windows 11
- Other names: Fluent UI; Microsoft Fluent Design System
- Original author: Microsoft
- Developer: Microsoft
- Release: 2017; 9 years ago
Release(s)
Stable release(s) [±]
- Web: 8.122.15 / 15 April 2025; 17 months ago
- Windows: 2.8.7 / February 4, 2025; 20 months ago
Preview release(s) [±]
- Android: 0.0.11 / February 12, 2021; 5 years ago
- iOS macOS: 0.2.3 / March 9, 2021; 5 years ago
- Windows: 2.6.0-prerelease.210315002 / March 17, 2021; 5 years ago
- Cross-platform: 0.23.3 / March 15, 2021; 5 years ago
- Written in: Objective-C, C++, C#, TypeScript, Kotlin, Swift, JavaScript
- Operating system: Android, iOS, macOS, Windows, Web browser
- Platform: ARM, x86-64
- Predecessor: Microsoft Design Language 2; Microsoft UI Fabric; Office UI Fabric
- Type: Design language software
- License: MIT License
- Website: developer.microsoft.com/fluentui
- Repository: Web: fluentui; Android: fluentui-android; iOS, macOS: fluentui-apple; Windows: microsoft-ui-xaml; Cross-platform: fluentui-react-native
More Information

Fluent Design System (codenamed "Project Neon") is a design language developed in 2017 by Microsoft. Fluent Design is a revamp of Microsoft Design Language 2 ("Metro") that includes guidelines for the designs and interactions used within software designed for the company's Windows 10 and Windows 11 devices and platforms. The system is based on five key components: light, depth, motion, material, and scale. The new design language includes more prominent use of motion, depth, and translucency effects.

The transition to Fluent is a long-term project; aspects of the design started appearing in Windows 10 beginning with the "Fall Creators Update" released in October 2017, as well as an update to the Xbox One system software released alongside it. It was later revealed to be designed in conjunction with Windows 10X, in addition to Windows 11 which has a similar design.

== Compared to Metro and Aero ==
Fluent's key principles, or "blocks" (Light, Depth, Motion, Material, and Scale), turn away from the flat concept Metro had defined, and while preserving the clean look and feel Metro introduced, Fluent renews the visuals of Aero, a design approach that was introduced in Windows Vista and Windows 7, including blurred translucency, parallax animated patterns, drop shadows, highlight effects following mouse pointer or input gesture movements, and "faux materials" Metro once discarded.

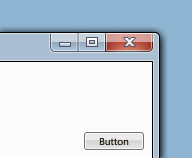
Aero

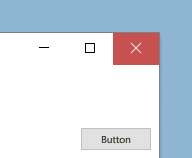
Metro

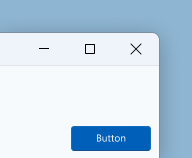
Fluent

Icons are also generally different, with Fluent not being as flat and simplistic as Metro.

Windows Calculator icons

Windows 8.1 (Metro)

Windows 10 (MDL2)

Windows 10 (from version 2004) and Windows 11 (Fluent)

== Design components ==
=== Light ===
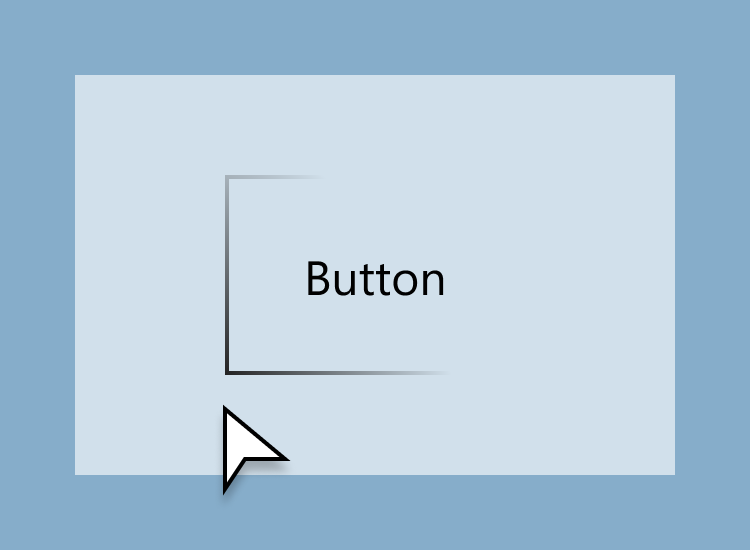
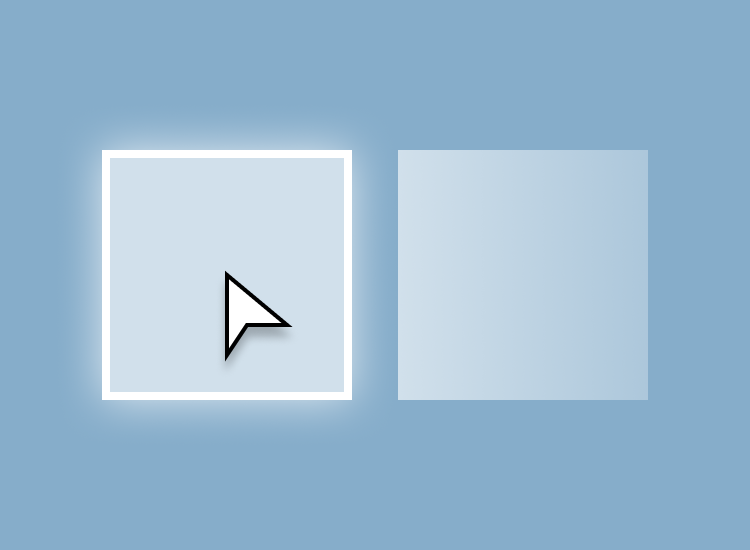
- Light Reveal Highlight Reveal Focus

The purpose of light is to draw attention and illuminate information. Therefore, light establishes a relationship between the UI and the cursor or pointer.

- Reveal highlight: Upon hovering, the reveal highlight illuminates nearby hidden borders on objects such as hamburger navigation menu lists and buttons. Upon selection, such as by clicking or tapping, a white circular illumination effect quickly appears.
- Reveal focus: Focusable items with a border glow via the focus visual.

With WinUI 2.6, Microsoft has discontinued reveal highlight to match their web and mobile offerings, which do not offer reveal highlight. Furthermore, with the release of Windows 11, Microsoft has slowly been removing its use of light effects in general, instead providing interactability though animations.

=== Depth ===
Depth is added to content through layering in the z-axis. Depth is presented via drop shadows and Z-depth layering. This is especially apparent in the redesigned Office app in 2019. In Windows 11, the use of depth is expanded by overlapping different surfaces with different opacities of the Mica material.

- Layering: Layering divides an app into the base which is the "canvas" and the content which floats on top. The content can be presented as a continuous surface or as a card.
- Elevation: Elevation is the use of separating elements from the app surface through the use of shadows. Examples include context menus, pop-ups or tooltips.

=== Motion ===
Motion establishes a relationship between UI elements and provides a continuity in the experience.

- Add/delete animations: List animations for inserting and removing items from a collection.
- Connected animations: Connected animations are item transitions. During a content change, an element appears to continue by flying across the app.
- Content transition: Used when only a portion of content on a page will change.
- Drill: Drill is used when navigating deeper into an app. For example, displaying more information after an item is selected.
- Fade: Fade-in and fade-out to bring items into and dismiss them from view.
- Parallax: Parallax moves objects at different rates. The background moves slower than the content above it. For example, a list will scroll faster than the background image, creating a depth effect in addition to motion.
- Press feedback: When an item is pressed, it momentarily recedes into the background and then returns to its original position. Examples of press feedback include the Start menu live tiles, Action Center quick actions, and Microsoft Edge address bar buttons.

=== Material ===
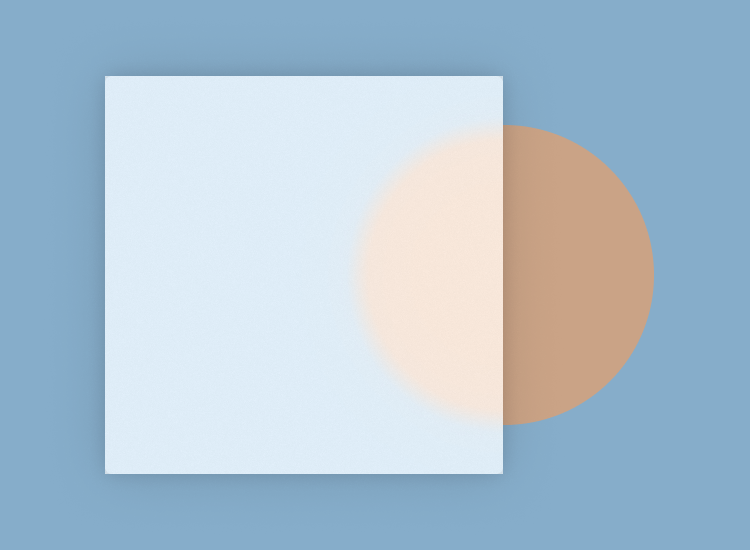
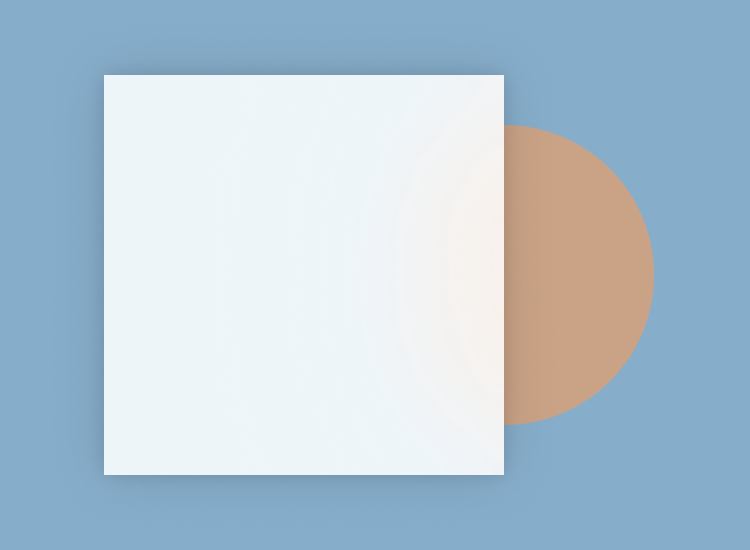
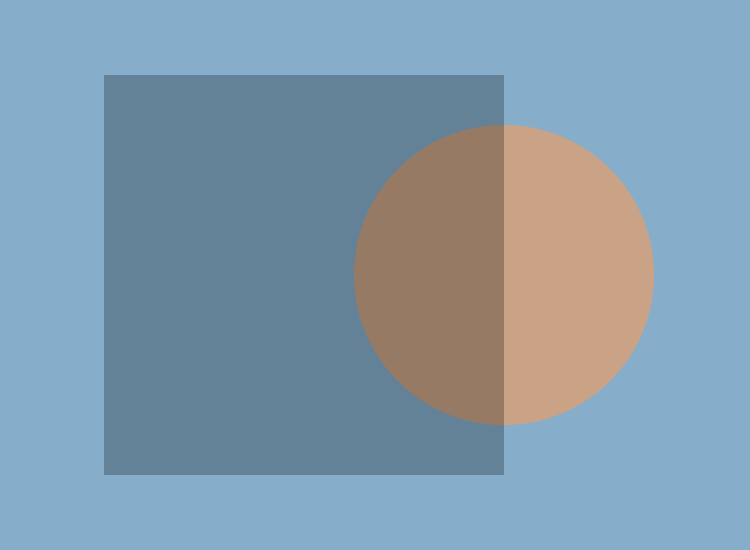
- Material Acrylic Mica Smoke The different materials used in Fluent Design

Materials are visual effects applied to UX surfaces. In fluent design there are two main kinds of materials: occluding and transparent. Occluding materials, such as acrylic and mica, form the base layers under interactive UI elements. Transparent materials like smoke are used to emphasize immersive surfaces:

- Acrylic: The acrylic material creates a translucent, blurred effect with a slight noise effect. While in Windows 10, Acrylic was used in large surfaces (such as side panels). With Windows 11, primary surfaces have abandoned Acrylic in favor of Mica. Instead, Acrylic is used in transient surfaces such as context menus, tooltips or predictions in search boxes.
- Mica: Mica is a new opaque material introduced in Windows 11 that takes on the tint of the user's wallpaper. Unlike acrylic, which was designed for transient surfaces (e.g., context menus), MMC is designed for use on long-lasting primary surfaces. By using different opacities, apps can create a visual hierarchy.
- Smoke: Smoke was introduced with Windows 11. It is a translucent black background, regardless of light or dark mode, in order to create a hierarchy between the main window and a pop-up.

Both Acrylic and Mica are disabled in a specific window when the app is no longer selected. Furthermore, both are disabled system-wide when transparency is disabled, when battery saver mode is enabled, or on low-end hardware. Background Acrylic is disabled when a window is deselected or in Windows 10 Mobile, HoloLens, or tablet mode.

=== Scale ===
Apps scale across different form factors and display sizes. Conscious controls are also categorized within Scale (e.g. scrollbars and inputs that adapt to different methods of invocation)

== Iconography ==
=== App Icons ===
New icons with acrylic materials have been created for Microsoft programs, starting with the Office apps and the Chromium-based Microsoft Edge in 2018 and 2019, respectively. Preliminary versions of the final icons were spotted in the "Meet the New Icons for Office 365" video, before more were spotted when Windows 10X was unveiled, prior to being officially revealed on December 12, 2019. These icons started appearing through Microsoft Store updates to those apps, beginning with Mail and Calendar.

=== Segoe Fluent Icons ===
MDL2

Fluent

Segoe Fluent Icons make up the set of icons designed by Microsoft for use in its products and services, alongside the redesign of the Segoe UI font (Segoe UI Variable). The icons are rounded, departing from the angular and straight Segoe MDL2 icons that were predominant during the Windows 10 era.

=== Fluent Emojis ===
Fluent

On July 15, 2021, Microsoft announced a complete redesign of its emoji library in order to align with its Fluent Design. Aiming to make Windows as consistent and accessible as possible, Microsoft made over 1,500 emojis open source on August 10, 2022. These new Fluent emojis depart from the flat and outlined style of the previous emoji library used in Windows 10 and instead embrace a 3D Play-Doh feel. Furthermore, Microsoft has stated their plans to animate most of them. While the 3D animated emojis can be seen in apps such as Microsoft Teams and Skype, Windows 11 initially used flat variants while the full rollout was delayed until 2023.

== Implementation ==
Fluent design guidelines are cross-platform and can be implemented with different frameworks. Fluent UI React is a set of React components that implement Microsoft's Fluent Design System. It provides a set of pre-built components that can be used to build applications for Windows, iOS, Android, macOS and the web. Furthermore, WinUI is a native user interface framework for building Windows apps. It is built on top of Fluent Design System and provides a set of pre-built controls.

WinUI			Fluent UI	
WinUI 2	WinUI 3		Fluent UI React v9	Web Components
UWP	UWP	Win32	React	Blazor
WinUI 2 is a library of controls and styles for building modern Windows apps. It is available for use in any UWP app and offers exciting, flexible, modern controls such as NavigationView and TeachingTip.	WinUI 3 is the next generation of the WinUI framework. It ships with the Windows App SDK. WinUI 3 expands WinUI into a full UX framework and provides a unified set of APIs and tools.		Fluent UI React v9 is the latest stable release of Fluent UI React and offers a collection of utilities, React components, and web components for building web applications. Fluent UI React v9 tries to streamline itself to its WinUI counterpart.	Web components are a set of web platform APIs that allow you to create new custom, reusable, encapsulated HTML tags to use in web pages and web apps.
UI Elements using WinUI			UI Elements using Fluent UI React v9	Example of UI elements using web components UI Elements using web components

== Influence ==
The popularity of the Fluent Design System influenced user interface and logo design in general, especially in the 2020s following the release of the company's Windows 11 itself and Apple's macOS Big Sur. It has spearheaded a style known as "glassmorphism" (a portmanteau of glass and skeuomorphism) that has replaced elements of flat design in digital design.

== See also ==
- Adwaita
- Liquid Glass
- Aqua
- Material Design
- Flat design
- Windows Aero
- Metro
