= Design language =

Overarching scheme that guides the design of a complement of products

A design language or design vocabulary is an overarching scheme or style that guides the design of a complement of products or architectural settings, creating a coherent design system for styling.

== Objectives ==
Designers wishing to give their suite of products a unique but consistent appearance and user interface can define a specification for it. The specification can describe choices for design aspects such as materials, color schemes, shapes, patterns, textures, or layouts. They then follow the scheme in the design of each object in the suite.

Usually, design languages are not rigorously defined; the designer basically makes one thing similarly as another. In other cases, they are followed strictly, so that the products gain a strong thematic quality. For example, although there is a great variety of unusual chess set designs, the pieces within a set are typically thematically consistent.

Sometimes, designers encourage others to follow their design languages when decorating or accessorizing.

== Industrial design ==
Industrial design is the process of designing products for mass production. A design language can provide a range of products a similar style that sets it apart from competitors.

In automotive design, the design language often uses a signature grille design. For instance, many BMW vehicles share a design language, including front-end styling consisting of a split "kidney grille" and four circular headlights. Some manufacturers have appropriated design language cues from rival firms.

=== Examples ===
In the 1980s, Memphis design became widely popular.

Apple used the Snow White design for its home computers in the 1980s, which used parallel stripes to give the impression that the enclosure was smaller than it actually was. The Apple Industrial Design Group is responsible for the industrial design of all Apple products.

Cadillac introduced the Art and Science design philosophy in 2000, which emphasized sharp and crisp edges — what noted automotive journalist Dan Neil described as a "fractal geometric style."

Ford used the New Edge design language in the 1990s and early 2000s, which combined intersecting arcs to create soft aerodynamic shapes. Later Ford used Kinetic Design that featured a large lower trapezoidal grill on many vehicles.

Mazda has used the Nagare design language, which used flowing lines influenced by wind. Mazda later used the Kodo design language.

Other examples include the Dynamic Shield design language used by Mitsubishi, and Dynamic x Solid used by Subaru.

== Software ==
In the context of graphical user interfaces, for example, human interface guidelines can be thought of as design languages for applications.

=== Examples ===
Apple has created some software design languages. Since 1997, the Platinum design language was used for Mac OS 8 and 9 and emphasized various shades of gray. From 2000 onwards, the Aqua design language was introduced with Mac OS X 10.0 and emphasized flatter interface elements and liberal use of reflection effects and transparency. Brushed metal, first used in 1999, was intended for programs such as QuickTime Player that mimic the operation or interface of common devices. In June 2025 during WWDC 2025, Apple introduced a new unified design language known as Liquid Glass across Apple platforms featuring optical properties of glass with a sense of fluidity.

Microsoft has used the Aero design language for Windows Vista and Windows 7 which appeared in 2006. The Aero design language used semitransparent glass like window borders as a distinctive feature. The Metro design language focused on simplified icons, absence of clutter and basic shapes. Metro was used in many Microsoft products including Windows 8, Windows Phone 7, the Xbox 360 and Xbox One. The Fluent Design System was developed as a revamp of Metro in 2017, and used more motion, depth and translucency effects.

Google developed Material Design in 2014 which emphasizes smooth responsive animations and transitions, padding and depth using lighting and shadows. Many of Google's products have implemented Material Design including Android, Android applications and web applications.

Flat design is a design language and style that simplifies elements and colours. It has influenced user interface design in Microsoft's Zune, Android starting with Android 4.0, iOS 7 and OS X Yosemite.

In 2021, the GNOME Project expanded its focus of Adwaita to allow it to prosper as a design language for GNOME.

== See also ==
- Graphic design
- Human interface guidelines
- Object-oriented modeling
- Pattern language
- User interface design
