= RealThings =

Early skeuomorphic design for digital interfaces, developed by IBM

IBM RealPhone—an example of the RealThings design methodology

IBM RealThings is a design methodology for software interfaces proposed by IBM in 1998. It proposed that graphical user interfaces should be represented as skeuomorphs (images of physical real-life objects) in order to be "natural and intuitive, allowing users to focus more on their tasks and less on computer artefacts".

As a demonstration, IBM created interfaces for a softphone, a media player and an e-reader application titled "RealPhone," "RealCD" and "RealBook", respectively. No actual applications using the design language were released.

A lecturer at the University of Liverpool, Floriana Grasso, critiqued this design language for not clearly communicating software functions to the user. A telephone program, for example, forced users to make calls by pressing on a picture of a telephone handset, rather than providing an explicitly labeled button for this function. .

== See also ==
- Microsoft Bob
