= Windows Aero =

Design language by Microsoft

A distinctive feature of Windows Aero showing "glass-like" window borders on Windows 7

Windows Aero (a backronym for Authentic, Energetic, Reflective, and Open) is the design language introduced in the Windows Vista operating system in 2006, and Windows 7 later in 2009. The changes introduced by Windows Aero encompassed many elements of the Windows interface, with the introduction of a new visual style with an emphasis on animation, glass, and translucency; interface guidelines for phrasing and tone of instructions and other text in applications were available. New cursors and sounds based on Windows Aero design principles were also introduced.

Windows Aero was used as the design language of Windows Vista and Windows 7. The flat design-based Metro design language was introduced on Windows 8, although aspects of the design and features promoted as part of Aero on Windows Vista and 7 have been retained in later versions of Windows (barring design changes to comply with Metro, MDL2, or Fluent).

== Features ==
Windows Aero is the next major revision to Microsoft's user design guidelines for Microsoft Windows since Windows XP, covering aesthetics, common controls such as buttons and radio buttons, task dialogs, wizards, common dialogs, control panels, icons, fonts, user notifications, and the "tone" of text used.

=== Windows Aero theme ===
Live thumbnails showing the Internet Explorer tabs on the taskbar

On Windows Vista and Windows 7 computers that meet certain hardware and software requirements, the Windows Aero theme is used by default, primarily incorporating various animation and transparency effects into the desktop using hardware acceleration and the Desktop Window Manager (DWM). In the "Personalize" section added to Control Panel of Windows Vista, users can customize the "glass" effects to either be opaque or transparent, and change the color it is tinted. Enabling Windows Aero also enables other new features, including an enhanced Alt-Tab menu and taskbar thumbnails with live previews of windows, and "Flip 3D", a window switching mechanism which cascades windows with a 3D effect.

Flip 3D showing the current tabs by pressing the key combination of ⊞ Win+Tab ↹

Windows 7 features refinements in Windows Aero, including larger window buttons by default (minimize, maximize, close and query), revised taskbar thumbnails, the ability to manipulate windows by dragging them to the top or sides of the screen (to the side to make it fill half the screen, and to the top to maximize), the ability to hide all windows by hovering the Show Desktop button on the taskbar, and the ability to minimize all other windows by shaking one.

Use of DWM, and by extension the Windows Aero theme, requires a Graphics card with 128 MB of video memory (or at least 64 MB of video RAM and 1 GB of system RAM for on-board graphics) supporting pixel shader 2.0, and with WDDM-compatible drivers. Windows Aero is also not available in Windows 7 Starter, only available to a limited extent on Windows Vista Home Basic, and is automatically disabled if a user is detected to be running a non-genuine copy of Windows. Windows Server 2008 and Windows Server 2008 R2 also support Windows Aero as part of the "Desktop Experience" component, which is disabled by default.

=== Aero Wizards ===
Wizard 97 had been the prevailing standard for wizard design, visual layout, and functionality used in Windows 98 through to Windows Server 2003, as well as most Microsoft products in that time frame. Aero Wizards are the replacement for Wizard 97, incorporating visual updates to match the aesthetics of the rest of Aero, as well as changing the interaction flow.

More specifically:

- To increase the efficiency of the wizard, the "Welcome" pages in Wizard 97 are no longer used. (A precursor to this change was implied in a number of wizards in products such as SQL Server 2005 where a check-box was added to welcome pages, allowing a user to disable the welcome page in future uses of the wizard.)
- Aero Wizards can be resized, whereas the Wizard 97 guidelines defined exact sizes for wizard window and content sizes.
- The purpose of Aero Wizards are more clearly stated at the top.
- A new kind of control called a "Command link" provides a single-click operation to choose from a short list of options.
- The notion of "Commit pages" is introduced, where it is made clear that the next step will be the actual process that the wizard is being used to enact. If no follow-up information needs to be communicated, these are the last pages in a wizard. Typically a commit page has a button at the bottom-right that is labeled with the action to be taken, such as "Create account".
- The "Back" button has moved to the top-left corner of the wizard window and matches the visual style of the back button in other Vista applications. This is done to give more focus to the commit choices. The "Next" button is only shown on pages where it is necessary.
- At the end of a wizard, a "Follow-up page" can be used to direct the user to related tasks that they may be interested in after completing the wizard. For example, a follow-up for a CD burning wizard may present options like "Duplicate this disc" and "Make a disc label".

=== Notifications ===
Notifications allow an application or operating system component with an icon in the notification area to create a pop-up window with some information about an event or problem. These windows, first introduced in Windows 2000 and known colloquially as "balloons", are similar in appearance to the speech balloons that are commonly seen in comics. Balloons were often criticized in prior versions of Windows due to their intrusiveness, especially with regard to how they interacted with full-screen applications such as games (the entire application was minimized as the bubble came up). Notifications in Aero aim to be less intrusive by gradually fading in and out, and not appearing at all if a full-screen application or screensaver is being displayed—in these cases, notifications are queued until an appropriate time. Larger icons and multiple font sizes and colors are also introduced with Aero's notification windows.

=== Font ===
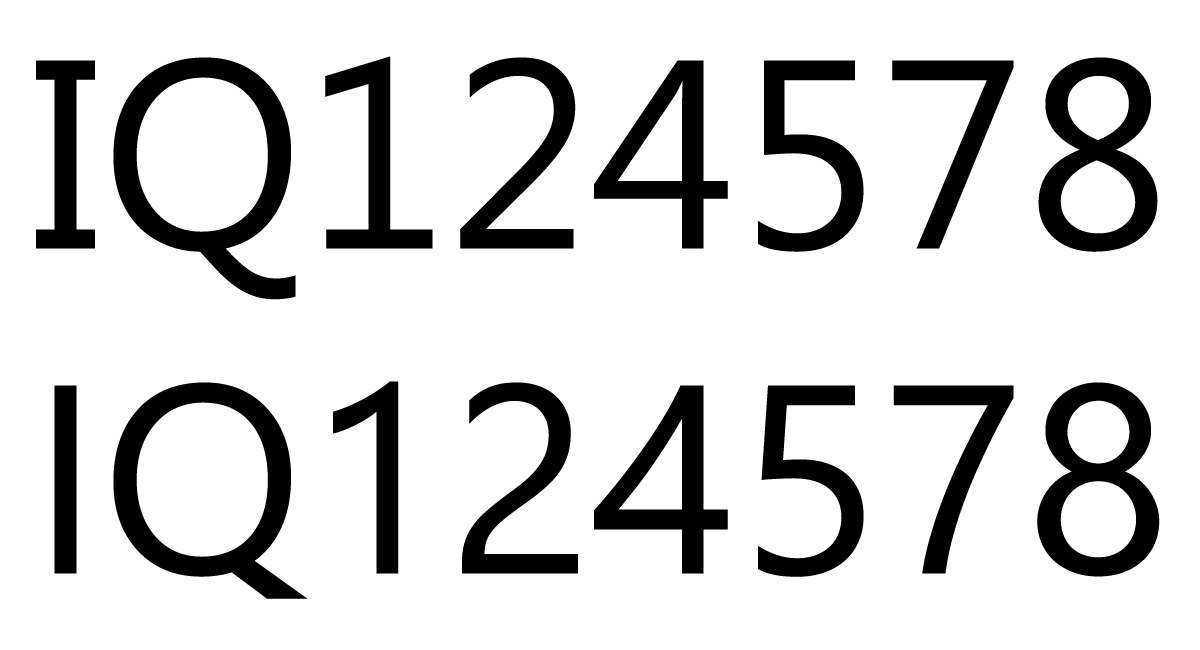
Segoe UI font in Windows Vista and Windows 7 (top); Windows 8, Windows 8.1, Windows 10, and Windows 11 (bottom)

The Segoe UI typeface is the default font for Aero with languages that use Latin, Greek, and Cyrillic character sets. The default font size is also increased from 8pt to 9pt to improve readability. In the Segoe UI typeface prior to Windows 8, the numeral zero ("0") is narrow, while capital letter "O" is wider (Windows 8's Segoe UI keeps this difference), and numeral one ("1") has a top hook, while capital letter "I" has equal crown and base (Windows 8's "1" has no base, and the "I" does not have a crown or base).

=== Icons ===
Aero's base icons were designed by The Iconfactory, which had previously designed Windows XP icons.

=== Phrasing tone ===
The Vista User Experience Guidelines also address the issue of "tone" in the writing of text used with the Aero user interface. Prior design guidelines from Microsoft had not done much to address the issue of how user interface text is phrased, and as such, the way that information and requests are presented to the user had not been consistent between parts of the operating system.

The guidelines for Vista and its applications suggest messages that present technically accurate advice concisely, objectively, and positively, and assume an intelligent user motivated to solve a particular problem. Specific advice includes the use of the second person and the active voice (e.g. "Print the photos on your camera") and avoidance of words like "please", "sorry" and "thank you".

== History ==
=== Windows Vista ===
The Aero interface was unveiled for Windows Vista as a complete redesign of the Windows interface, replacing Windows XP's "Luna" theme. Until the release of Windows Vista Beta 1 in July 2005, little had been shown of Aero in public or leaked builds, with alpha builds containing interim designs such as "Plex".

Windows Aero incorporated the following features in Windows Vista.

- Windows Aero theme: The main component of Aero, it is the successor of Windows XP's "Luna" and changes the look and feel of graphical control elements, including but not limited to buttons, checkboxes, radio buttons, menus, progress bars and default Windows icons. Even message boxes are changed.
- Windows Flip improvements: Windows Flip (Alt+Tab) in Windows Vista now shows a live preview of each open window instead of the application icons.
- Windows Flip 3D: Windows Flip 3D (Windows key+Tab) renders live images of open windows, allowing one to switch between them while displaying them in a three-dimensional view.
- Taskbar live thumbnails – Hovering over the taskbar button of a window displays a preview of that window in the taskbar.
- Desktop Window Manager (DWM) – Due to the significant impact of the new changes on hardware and performance, Desktop Window Manager was introduced to achieve hardware acceleration, transferring the duty of UI rendering from CPU to graphic subsystem. DWM in Windows Vista required compatible hardware.
- Task Dialogs: Dialog boxes meant to help communicate with the user and receive simple user input. Task Dialogs are more complex than traditional message boxes that only bear a message and a set of command buttons. Task Dialogs may have expandable sections, hyperlinks, checkboxes, progress bars and graphical elements.

=== Windows 7 ===
Windows Aero is revised in Windows 7, with many UI changes, such as a more touch friendly interface, and many new visual effects and features including pointing device gestures:

Aero Peek showing the Windows 7 desktop when the mouse is pointed on the "show desktop" button on taskbar

- Aero Peek: Hovering over a taskbar thumbnail shows a preview of the entire window. Aero Peek is also available through the "Show desktop" button at the right end of the taskbar, which makes all open windows transparent for a quick view of the desktop. A similar feature was patented during Windows Vista development.
- Aero Shake: Quickly dragging a window back and forth minimizes all other windows. Shaking it again restores them.
- Aero Snap: Dragging a window to the right or left side of the desktop causes the window to fill the respective half of the screen. Snapping a window to the top of the screen maximizes it. Windows can be resized by stretching them to touch the top or bottom of the screen, which fully increases their vertical screen estate, while retaining their width, these windows can then slide horizontally if moved by the title bar, or pulled off, which returns the window to its original height.
- Touchscreen gestures and support for high DPI on displays were added.
- Title bars of maximized windows remain transparent instead of becoming opaque.
- The outline of non-maximized windows is completely white, rather than having a cyan outline on the right side and bottom.
- The taskbar was redesigned to automatically group windows by application, and only show their icon by default. When hovering over the taskbar button of an open program, the button glows the dominant RGB color of its icon, with the effect following the mouse cursor.
- Progress indicators are present in taskbar buttons. For example, downloading a file in a web browser can cause the button to fill with color as the operation progresses.
- The window color is now affected by a multiplication blending mode. While the amount of blending cannot be adjusted by the user manually through normal means, the amount of color multiplication is adjusted in conjunction when adjusting color intensity. The higher the color intensity, the lower amount of color multiplication and vice versa. This also results in window colors that are not as vivid at lower intensities on darker backgrounds as they would be in Windows Vista.

=== In later versions of Windows ===
Some of the features introduced in Aero remain in modified forms in later versions of Windows.

- Windows 8
  - While pre-release versions of Windows 8 used an updated version of Windows Aero with a flatter, squared look, the Glass theme was replaced prior to release by a new flat design theme based on Metro design language. Transparency effects were removed from the interface, aside from the taskbar, which maintained transparency but no longer has a blur effect.
  - Flip 3D is removed; ⊞ Win+Tab ↹ was changed to switch between the desktop and Windows Store apps.
- Windows 10
  - The OS initially maintained an updated version of Metro, but began to increasingly reinstate detailed lighting effects (including those that follow the cursor) and Aero glass-like transparency via its migration to Fluent Design System as a successor to Metro.
  - Virtual desktops have been added via "Task View". This takes over the ⊞ Win+Tab ↹ keyboard shortcut.
  - Window snapping has been extended to allow applications to be snapped to quadrants of the screen. When a window is snapped to half of the screen, the user is prompted to select a second window to occupy the other half of the screen.
  - Aero Shake is now referred to as "Title bar window shake".
- Windows 11
  - Predefined "snap layouts" can be activated by hovering over the maximize/restore button on a titlebar. Sets of windows formed using snap layouts ("snap groups") can be minimized and restored from the taskbar as a group.
  - Some window title bars are now transparent and blurred using the Mica material new to Windows 11. The Mica material only uses the user's desktop background and blurs it as the texture of some title bars, rather than a real-time blurring effect.

== Reception ==
Windows Aero garnered a range of responses upon its debut in Windows Vista. Paul Thurrott called the visual style "gorgeous" and "one of the nicest things about running Windows Vista", praising its customizability. Critics favorably compared it to Mac OS X's graphical user interface, Aqua. PC World lauded its "tasteful" animations and "elegant" design, with a "less cartoonish" look than Luna for Windows XP, stating that "it makes life at the keyboard fun again". The Register was more reserved; while stating Aero came close to KDE in how good it looked, the reviewer was ultimately repelled by the user interface's taking up resources on his graphics card, reporting that its fan would run audibly continuously. IT Pro noted that the interface would invite detractors to assert that most of the enhancements are merely aesthetically superfluous, while warning that disabling the visual effects could slow down one's computer by shifting the graphical load back onto the CPU.

== Legacy ==
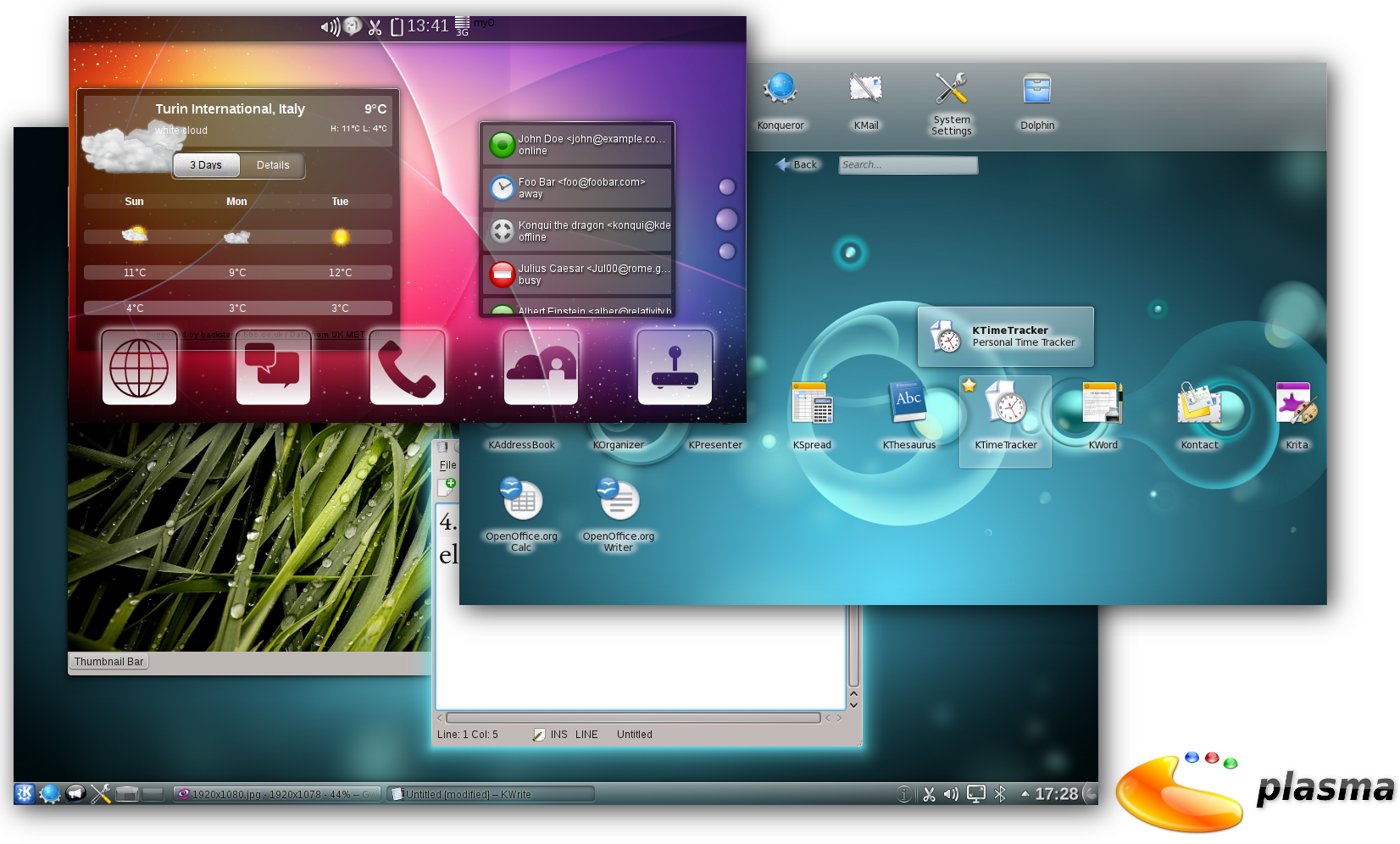
(KDE Plasma 4 from 2011), often cited as an example of Frutiger Aero

Retroactively, a design style, Internet aesthetic, and UI/UX design trend based on Windows Aero called Frutiger Aero has been identified, which was popular from roughly 2004 to 2013. It is characterized by modern and organic themes associated with nature, glass, water and air. The name was coined by Sofi Lee in 2017, as a combination of Aero and the Frutiger typeface, which was popular with corporate materials of the time.

== See also ==
- Android Holo
- Aqua (user interface)
- Compiz
- Compositing window manager
- Desktop Window Manager
- Development of Windows 7
- Development of Windows Vista
- Features new to Windows 7
- Features new to Windows Vista
- KDE Software Compilation 4#Visual
- Kwin
- Liquid Glass
