= Panel (computer software) =

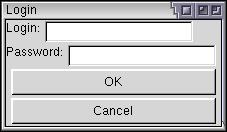
XUL Example

A panel is "a particular arrangement of information grouped together for presentation to users in a window or pop-up". In ISPF, a panel is "a predefined display image that you see on a display screen". In modern multiple-document interface software a panel refers to a particular arrangement of information grouped together and presented to users docked (by default) in the user interface rather than floating in a window, pop-up or dialog box.

A panel graphical control element is commonly packaged as part of a widget toolkit (libraries that contain a collection of graphical control elements) for a graphical user interface. See toolbar and dialog box.

== See also ==
- GNOME Panel
- Kicker (KDE)
- Layout manager
- Control panel (software)
