= Skeuomorph =

Design element borrowed from original medium

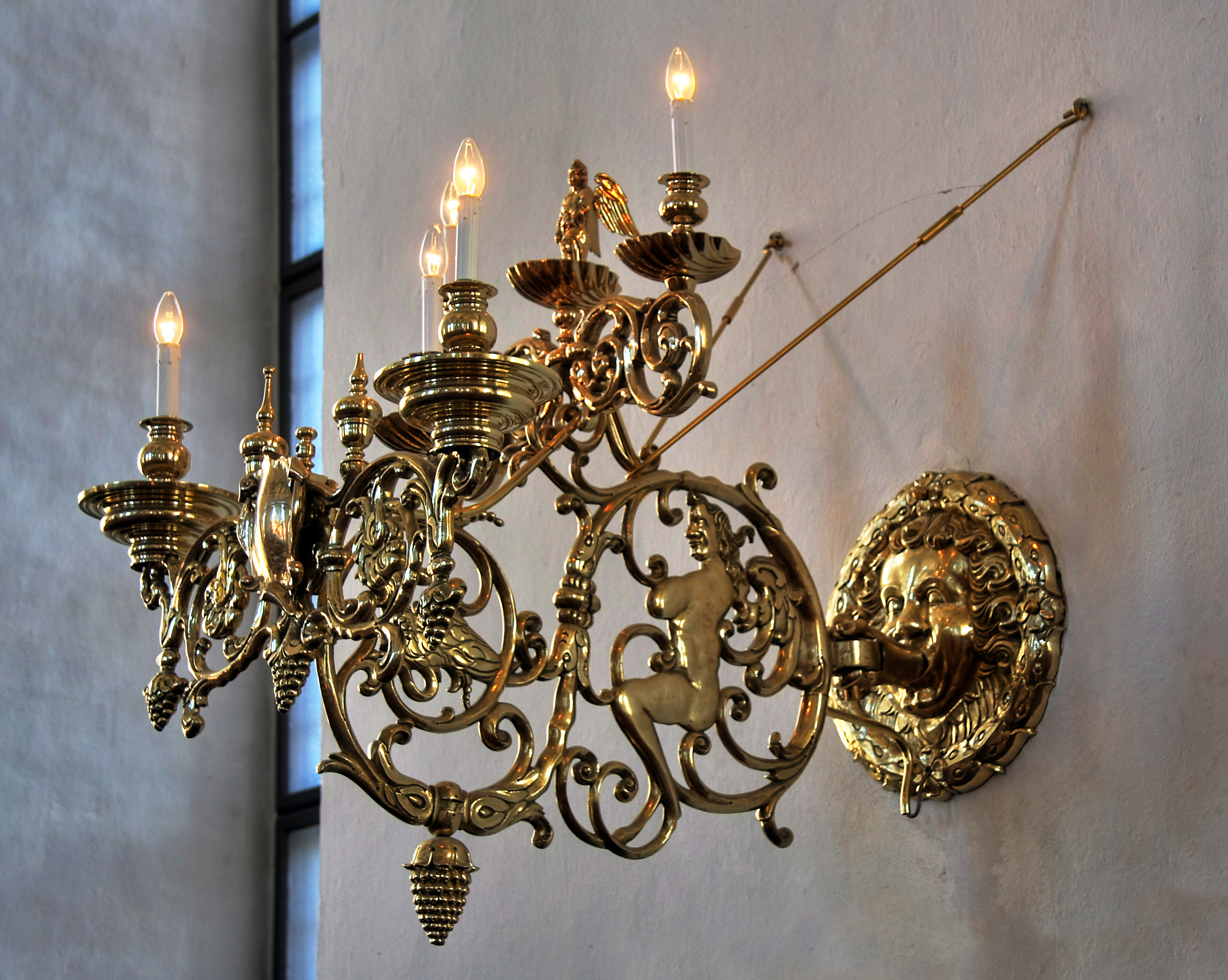
Electric light bulbs in the shape of candle flames

A skeuomorph (also spelled skiamorph, /ˈskjuːəˌmɔːrf, ˈskjuːoʊ-/) is a derivative object that retains ornamental design cues (attributes) from structures that were necessary in the original. Skeuomorphs are typically used to make something new feel familiar, thus easier to understand and use. They employ elements that, while essential to the original object, serve no pragmatic purpose in the new system, except for identification. Examples include pottery embellished with imitation rivets reminiscent of similar pots made of metal, or a software calendar that imitates the appearance of binding on a paper desk calendar.

== Etymology and scope ==
The term skeuomorph is compounded from the Greek skeuos (σκεῦος), meaning "container or tool", and morphḗ (μορφή), meaning "shape". It has been applied to material objects since 1890. In graphical computer interfaces starting in the 1980s, skeuomorphs are a design convention for graphic elements.

Skeuomorphs may be deliberately employed to make a new design more familiar and comfortable or may be the result of cultural influences and norms on the designer. They may be the artistic expression on the part of the designer. The usability researcher and academic Don Norman describes skeuomorphism in terms of cultural constraints: interactions with a system that are learned only through culture. Norman also popularized perceived affordances, where the user can tell what an object provides or does based on its appearance, which skeuomorphism can enable.

The concept of skeuomorphism overlaps with other design concepts. Mimesis is an imitation, coming directly from the Greek word. Archetype is the original idea or model that is emulated, where the emulations can be skeuomorphic. Skeuomorphism is parallel to, but different from, path dependence in technology, where an element's functional behavior is maintained even when the original reasons for its design no longer exist.

== Physical examples ==
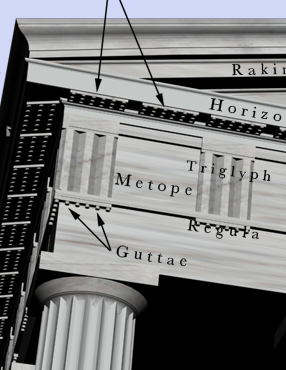
Triglyph and guttae in the Doric order; traditionally seen as recreating in stone functional features of the wooden Greek temples that preceded them.

Many features of wooden buildings were repeated in stone by the Ancient Greeks when they transitioned from wood to masonry construction. Decorative stone features in the Doric order of classical architecture in Greek temples such as triglyphs, mutules, guttae, and modillions are supposed to be derived from true structural and functional features of the early wooden temples. The triglyph and guttae are seen as recreating, respectively, the carved beam-ends and six wooden pegs driven in to secure the beam in place.

Historically, high-status items such as the Minoans' elaborate and expensive silver cups were recreated for a wider market using pottery, a cheaper material. The exchange of shapes between metalwork and ceramics, often from the former to the latter, is near-constant in the history of the decorative arts. Sometimes pellets of clay are used to evoke the rivets of the metal originals.

There is also evidence of skeuomorphism in material transitions. Leather and pottery often carry over features from the wooden counterparts of previous generations. Clay pottery has also been found bearing rope-shaped protrusions, pointing to craftsmen seeking familiar shapes and processes while working with new materials. Another example is the small non-functional handles on glass maple syrup bottles, which evoke stoneware jug handles. In this context, skeuomorphs exist as traits sought in other objects, either for their social desirability or psychological comforts.

In the modern era, cheaper plastic items often mimic more expensive wooden and metal products, though they are only skeuomorphic if new ornamentation references the original functionality, such as molded screw heads in molded plastic items. The lever on a mechanical slot machine, or "one-armed bandit", is skeuomorphic on a modern video slot machine, since mechanical force is no longer necessary. Articles of clothing are also given skeuomorphic treatment; for example, faux buckles on certain strap shoes such as Mary Janes for small children, which retain the aesthetic but use velcro fastening to make them easier to use.

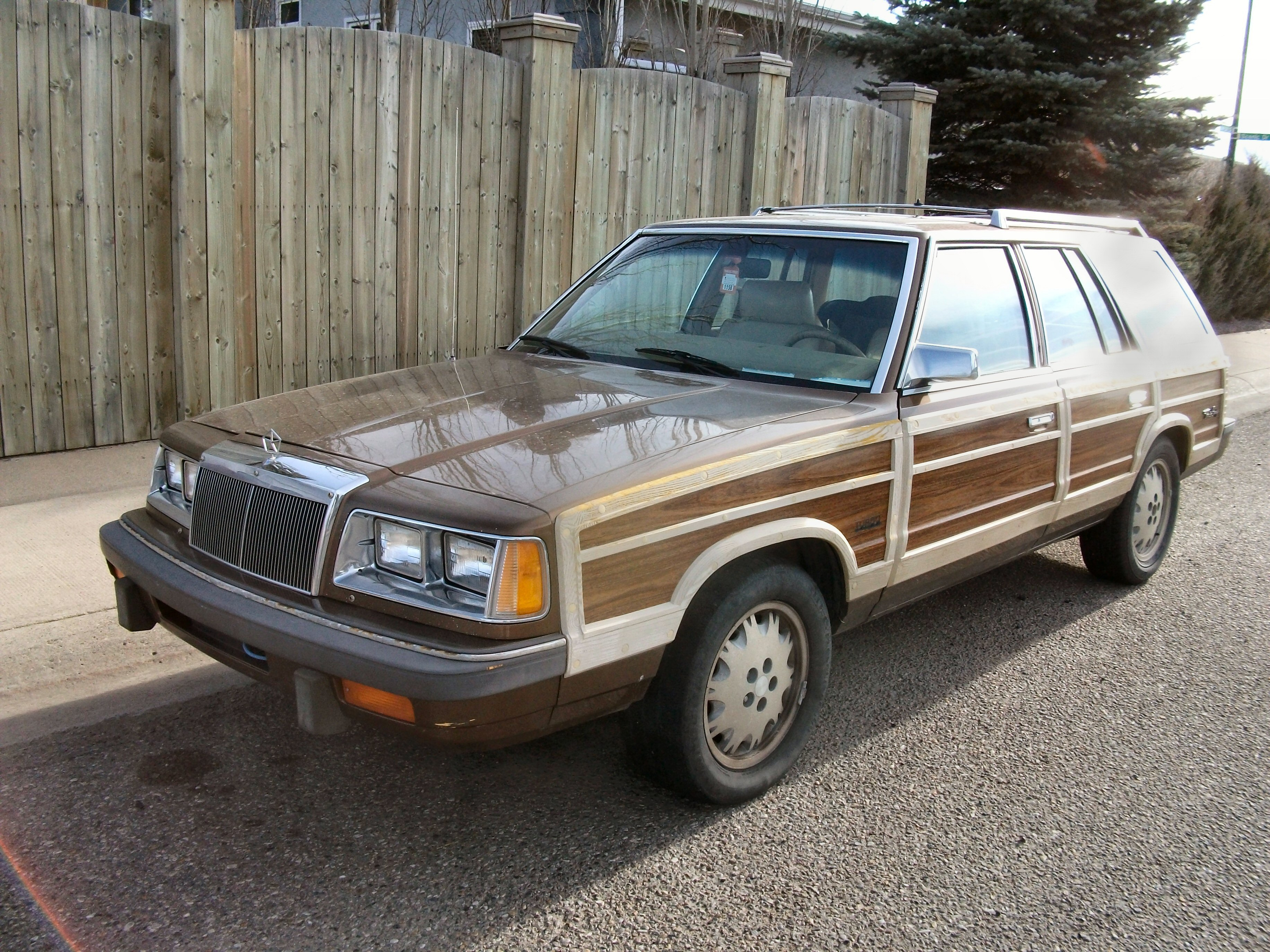
Chrysler LeBaron Town & Country (1986)

Automotive design has historically been full of physical skeuomorphisms, such as the transformation from wooden framed and bodied early vehicles produced by coachworks to those which incorporated both functional wood and steel (referred to as "woodies") to, ultimately, simulated vinyl woodgrain cladding entirely for style by the 1960s. Other examples include thinly faux chrome-plated plastic components and imitation leather, gold, interior wood, pearl, or crystal jeweled elements. In The Design of Everyday Things, Don Norman notes that early automobiles were designed after horse-drawn carriages. Indeed, the early automobile design Horsey Horseless even included a wooden horse head on the front to try to minimize scaring the real animals. In the 1970s, opera windows and vinyl roofs on many luxury sedan cars similarly imitated carriage work from the horse and buggy era. As of 2019, most electric cars feature prominent front grilles, even though there is little need for intake of air to cool an absent internal combustion engine.

== Virtual examples ==
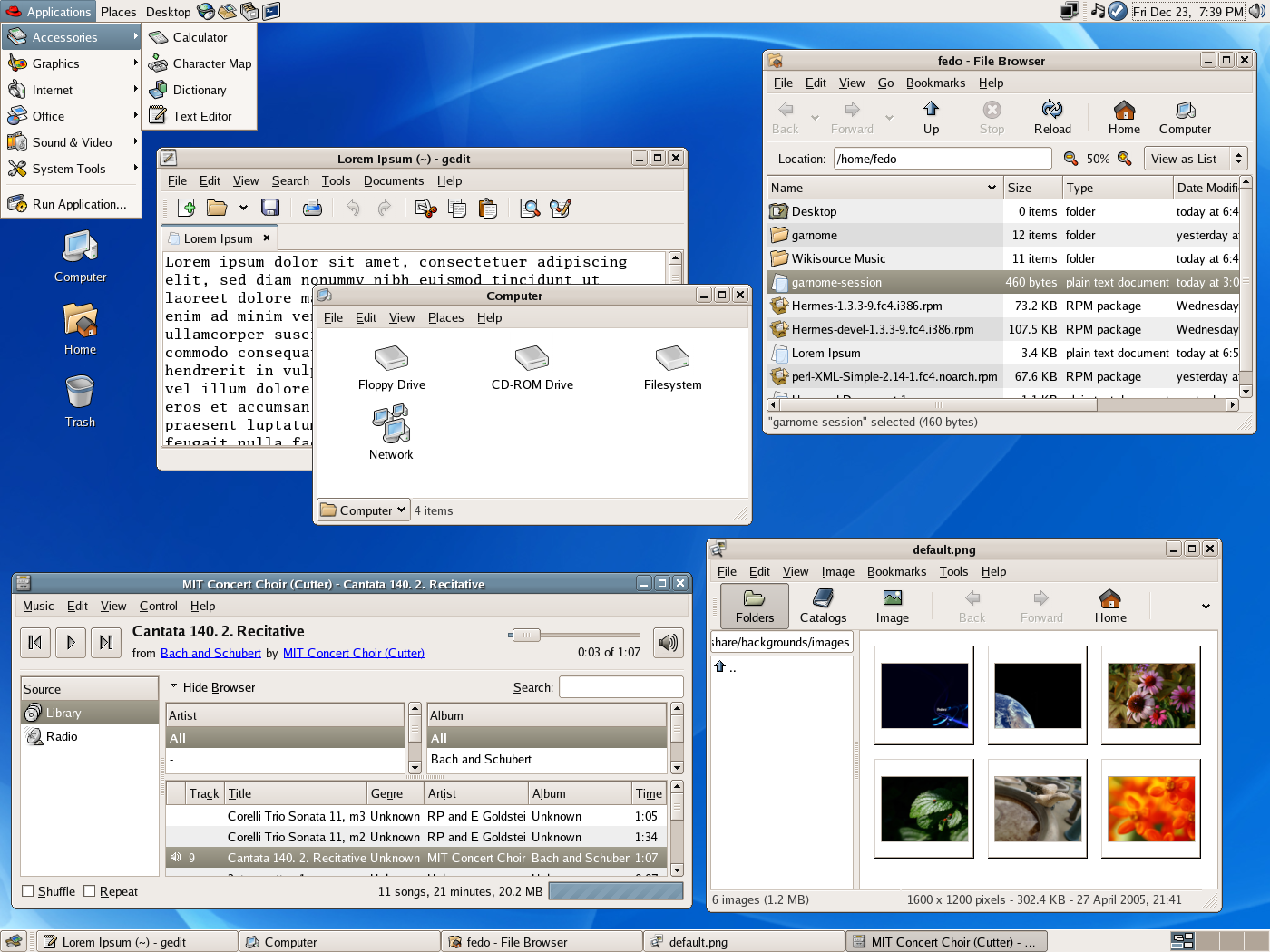
Documents and other information on a computer desktop

Due to the relatively abstract nature of computing, many operating systems have a skeuomorphic graphical user interface that emulates the aesthetics of physical objects to aid familiarity. A prominent example is the desktop metaphor, which represents programs and filesystem objects as if they were objects on the user's desk. At the extreme, interfaces such as Microsoft Bob extend the metaphor to the user's entire computing experience, representing different programs as objects in a home.

Skeuomorphs are also used by individual computer programs, often representing the program's interface as a physical object with a similar function. Examples include a digital contact list resembling a Rolodex and IBM's 1998 RealThings package. Software calculators often resemble physical calculators. Software clocks may resemble a clock face with moving hands. A more extreme example is found in some music synthesis and audio processing software packages, which closely emulate physical musical instruments and audio equipment complete with buttons and dials. Icons of GUIs may also depict skeuomorphic representations of physical objects, such as an image of a physical paper folder to represent computer files in the desktop metaphor or an image of a bell for representing notifications.

Virtual skeuomorphs can also be auditory. The shutter-click sound emitted by most camera phones when taking a picture is an auditory skeuomorph. Other familiar examples are the paper-crumpling sound when a document is trashed and the sound engines in an electric car mimicking the sound of an internal combustion engine.

A floppy disk icon representing "save", in Open Office Writer

Other virtual skeuomorphs do not employ literal images of some physical object; but rather allude to ritual human heuristics or heuristic motifs, such as slider bars that emulate linear potentiometers and visual tabs that behave like physical tabbed file folders. Another example is the swiping hand gesture for turning the "pages" or screens of a tablet display. In some cases, skeuomorphs start out as direct representations of physical objects, but later become indirectly symbolic of the task they represent (such as a drawing of a floppy disk to represent "save", which persisted even after floppy disks were no longer widely used for data storage).

Some virtual skeuomorphs have become emblematic of certain companies or time periods. Apple Inc., while under the direction of Steve Jobs, was known for its wide usage of skeuomorphic designs in Mac OS X and various applications. This changed after Jobs's death when Scott Forstall, described as "the most vocal and high-ranking proponent of the visual design style favored by Mr. Jobs", resigned. Apple designer Jonathan Ive took over some of Forstall's responsibilities and had "made his distaste for the visual ornamentation in Apple's mobile software known within the company". With the announcement of iOS 7 at WWDC in 2013, Apple officially shifted from skeuomorphism to a more simplified design, thus beginning the so-called "death of skeuomorphism" at Apple. Skeuomorphism is also a key component of Frutiger Aero, an Internet aesthetic derived from mid-2000s user interface designs, including Microsoft's skeuomorph design from Windows XP to Windows 7.

== In design ==
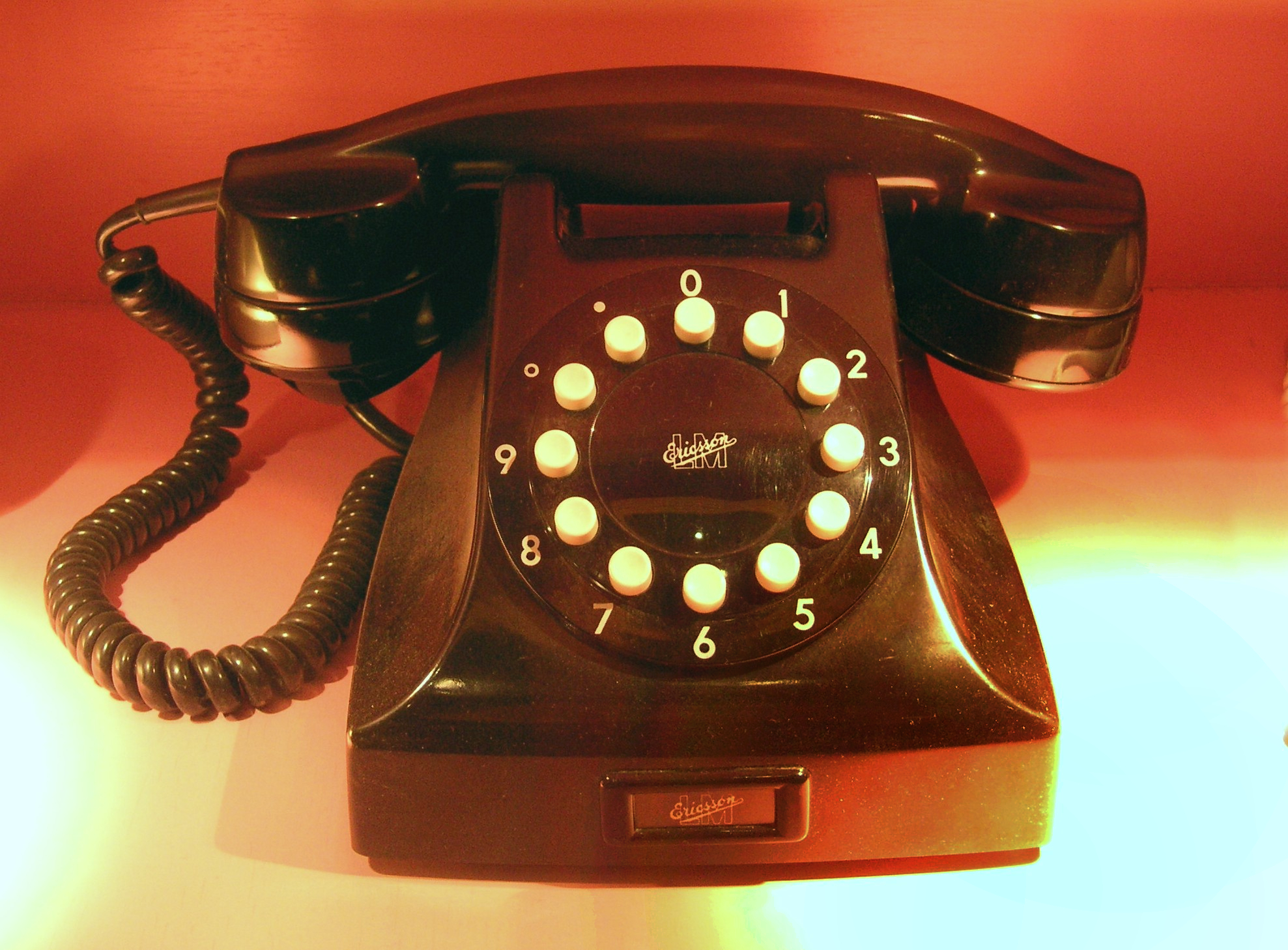
Pushbutton telephone with imitation rotary dial

Retrofuturism incorporates visual motifs from old predictions of the future. Skeuomorphic design is frequently incorporated in retrowave or synthwave illustrations. Skeuomorphic design is closely linked with metamodernism.

Skeuomorphic design seems to be preferred by older recipient groups, often referred to as "digital immigrants", while "digital natives" tend to favor flat design over skeuomorphisms. However, younger people are still able to understand the signifiers that skeuomorphic design employs. A better user experience could be measured for each respective design philosophy among digital natives and immigrants.

=== Arguments in favor ===
An argument in favor of skeuomorphic design in digital devices is that signifiers to affordances help those familiar with the original item learn to use the digital version. Interaction paradigms for computer devices are culturally entrenched; proposals for change often spawn debate. Don Norman describes this process as a form of cultural heritage, and credits skeuomorphism with easing transitions to newer technology, stating that it "gives comfort and makes learning easier" until the newer devices no longer need to resemble their predecessors.

Compared to flat design, skeuomorphic design seems to facilitate a fast navigation through graphic user interfaces, because icons are more easily recognized and less abstract than their minimalistic counterparts found in flat design.

=== Arguments against ===
The arguments against virtual skeuomorphic design are that skeuomorphic interface elements are harder to operate and take up more screen space than standard interface elements, that this breaks operating system interface design standards, that it causes an inconsistent look and feel between applications, that skeuomorphic interface elements rarely incorporate numeric input or feedback for accurately setting a value, that many users may have no experience with the original device being emulated, that skeuomorphic design can increase cognitive load with visual noise that after a few uses gives little or no value to the user, that skeuomorphic design limits creativity by grounding the user experience to physical counterparts, and that skeuomorphic designs often do not accurately represent underlying system state or data types due to inappropriate mimesis. For example, an analog gauge interface may be read less precisely than a digital one.

== See also ==
- Anachronism
- Dead metaphor
- Facadism
- Flat design
- Frutiger Aero
- Human interface guidelines
- Intuition
- Neumorphism
- Spandrel
- Trompe-l'œil, 2D artwork using realistic optical illusions to simulate three dimensions
- Vestigiality

== General references ==
- Flecker, Manuel (2021). "An Age of Intermateriality: Skeuomorphism and Intermateriality between the Late Republic and Early Empire". In Haug, Annette; Hielscher, Adrian; Lauritsen, Michael T. (eds.). Materiality in Roman Art and Architecture: Aesthetics, Semantics and Function. Berlin: De Gruyter. pp. 265–283. doi:10.1515/9783110764734-015.
- Freeth, C. M., & Taylor, T. F. (2001). Skeuomorphism in Scythia: Deference and Emulation, Olbia ta antichnii svit. Kiev: British Academy; Ukrainian Academy of Sciences. p. 150.
