= Carole Ann Klonarides =

American curator, video artist and writer (born 1951)

- Born: 1951 (age 74–75); Washington, DC
- Education: New School for Social Research, Whitney Independent Study Program, Virginia Commonwealth University
- Known for: Video art, curating, art writing
- Awards: National Endowment for the Arts Lila Wallace Reader's Digest Writers Award, Andy Warhol Foundation, Los Angeles Cultural Affairs

Carole Ann Klonarides (born 1951) is an American curator, video artist, writer and art consultant that has been based in New York and Los Angeles. She has worked in curatorial positions at the Santa Monica Museum of Art (1997–2000) and Long Beach Museum of Art (1991–95), curated exhibitions and projects for PS1 and Museum of Modern Art (MOMA), Laforet Museum (Tokyo), and Video Data Bank, among others, and been a consultant at the Getty Research Institute. Klonarides emerged as an artist among the loosely defined Pictures Generation group circa 1980; her video work (often in collaboration with Michael Owen as MICA-TV) has been presented in numerous museum exhibitions, including "Video and Language: Video As Language" (LACE, Renaissance Society, 1986–7), "documenta 8," "New Works for New Spaces: Into the Nineties," (Wexner Center for the Arts, inaugural exhibition, 1989), and "The Pictures Generation, 1974-1984" (Metropolitan Museum of Art, 2009), and at institutions such as MoMA, the Smithsonian Hirshhorn Museum, Contemporary Arts Center, the New Museum, The Kitchen, and School of the Art Institute of Chicago (2016). Her work belongs to the permanent collections of MoMA, the Whitney Museum of American Art, Getty Museum, Centre Pompidou, Contemporary Arts Museum Houston, Museu-Fundacão Calouste Gulbenkian (Lisbon), Museo Nacional Centro de Arte Reina Sofía (Madrid), and National Gallery of Canada, and is distributed by the Video Data Bank and Electronic Arts Intermix (EAI).

== Early life and career ==
Klonarides was born in Washington, DC. In 1972, while an undergraduate at Virginia Commonwealth University, she moved to New York City and attended the year-long Whitney Independent Study Program. She completed her BFA in painting and printmaking (1973) while still living in New York, and started working at various galleries, including OK Harris Gallery. Klonarides began exploring video while working at the Brooklyn Museum Art School in the early 1970s; she organized a video panel, "A New Generation of Artists?" that included Lizzie Borden, Paula Cooper, Neil Jenney, and Joel Shapiro, and made her first video, Post-Show Depression, in 1975, documenting young artists Judy Rifka, Bill Jensen, Barbara Schwartz, and Porfirio DiDonna taking their first one-person shows down. She later worked late night clubs as a VJ (video jockey) and presented video programs in galleries, lofts, and as program director for the Artists' Television Network on Manhattan Cable Television. In 1980, while attending the New School for Social Research (MA, media studies, 1983), Klonarides met Michael Owen and they formed MICA-TV, a video production company focused on making videos with contemporary artists.

== Curating ==
Klonarides has worked as an art and media curator for more than four decades; she has been listed among the west's top curators by the Los Angeles Times and CBS Los Angeles. In 1983, she curated the show "Borrowed Time" at Baskerville + Watson, combining works by known artists Nam June Paik, Norman Rockwell and William Wegman with those of then-emerging artists, such as Louise Lawler, Richard Prince, and Aura Rosenberg; the show led to her being hired as gallery director and organizing exhibitions of Dike Blair, Carroll Dunham, Deborah Kass, and Sherrie Levine, among others from 1983 to 1987. She also organized "TV: For Real" for the Laforet Museum in Tokyo (1989) and curated the video programs "It's Evening in America" (1989) on the Reagan years and "The Alternative Voice" for Video Data Bank's "Video Drive-In" in New York's Central Park (1990).

In 1991, Klonarides moved to California to accept a position as media arts curator for the Long Beach Museum of Art (LBMA), which was known for its adventurous curatorial policy. She organized the video exhibit, "The Call: Personal Insights on the Middle East and North Africa" (1992), which included works by Elia Suleiman and Jayce Salloum, Mona Hatoum, and Michel Auder; the Los Angeles Times noted the show for its post-Gulf War "reminders of the futility and agony of war, and the mindless level of political and media-created rhetoric." Critic Christopher Knight described the subsequent multimedia exhibition, "Relocations and Revisions: The Japanese-American Internment Reconsidered"—with work by Margaret Honda, Rea Tajiri and Bruce and Norman Yonemoto—as "generous, provocative" and engaging. "Sugar 'n Spice" (1993, co-curated by Noriko Gamblin) featured eleven Los Angeles women artists (including Jacci Den Hartog, Hilja Keading, Jennifer Steinkamp, Diana Thater, and Pae White) and was called "subversive in a sneakily anarchic way" by critic Cathy Curtis. Klonarides also organized the LBMA shows, "Gary Hill: Sites Recited" (1993)—his first career survey—and "New California Video: 1994-1995."

From 1997 to 2000, Klonarides served as curator of programming for the Santa Monica Museum of Art. While at SMMA, she organized performance events and exhibitions for Liza Lou, Andrea Bowers, Robert Mapplethorpe, Pierre Huyghe, and Yoshitomo Nara, among others and co-curated the influential show, "Mise en Scene: New LA Sculpture," with Bruce Hainley. Independently, she curated a mid-career survey for George Stone at the Los Angeles Municipal Art Gallery (2003) and organized a public installation of a Jessica Bronson's work in Old Town Pasadena (2004). In 2012, she worked with Dawn Kasper on "00:00 [RESET]," a performance series and website sponsored by LAX and the Getty Research Institute. She also curated "Che Mondo" (2013), an exhibition of contemporary photography for Los Angeles Municipal Art Gallery, and "Alex Slade: What City Pattern?" (2013) and "Richard Prince: The Douglas Blair Turnbaugh Collection (1977–1988)" (2016), both at Edward Cella Art + Architecture. To celebrate the 40th anniversary of Semiotext(e) in 2014, Klonaridis organized the re-presentation of the 1978 Cine Virus film program, originally curated by Kathryn Bigelow and Michael Oblowitz, which was accompanied by multi-day conferences at both MoMA PS1 and CalArts's REDCAT Theater.

== Video work ==
Klonarides rose to prominence in the early 1980s for collaborative video productions with Michael Owen as MICA-TV, which fused pop culture, television formulas and genres—often subverting them—and contemporary art. In earlier works (1981–6), they created video "portraits" of contemporary artists, such as Cindy Sherman, Richard Prince, Laurie Simmons, and John Torreano, that translated each subject's work into a televisual mode through specific aural and visual themes and formats, often with a sense of deadpan humor [and conceptual sophistication]. They collaborated with artists Dike Blair and Dan Graham and composer Christian Marclay on CASCADE/ Vertical Landscapes (1988), a postmodern, ironic ode to the contemporary American urban and suburban landscape. The video structures a continuous flow of seamlessly edited and scored vertical movement—common to the artists' work—incorporating modern shopping malls, video arcades and pop culture products and was a co-production with the U.K.'s Channel Four for the series "Ghosts in the Machine."

In later work, they created profiles of Vito Acconci, Joel Otterson, Mierle Laderman Ukeles, and others for the 1989 World Financial Center exhibition "The New Urban Landscape," and of Chuck Close (1991) and John Baldessari (1994) for MoMA. For The In-Between (1990), created for the opening of the Wexner Center for the Arts, MICA-TV collaborated with writer Susan Daitch on a contemporary, fractured Gothic narrative that mixed ideas from the building's architect, Peter Eisenman, imagery of the Center itself, and psychoanalytic processes. MICA-TV has been recognized with grants from the New York State Council on the Arts, the National Endowment for the Arts and the New York Foundation for the Arts.

In 1984, Klonarides, Lyn Blumenthal, and painter Ed Paschke produced the video Arcade, which was shown in documenta 8 and in the traveling exhibition, "Making Their Mark: Women Artists Move into the Mainstream, 1970-1985" (1989, Cincinnati Art Museum). Artforum's Judith Russi Kirshner wrote of the video's recycled television and film imagery, location footage of Chicago "L" stations and computerized paintings by Paschke, "Flashing insights and lights, the ready-made imagery presents a sideshow of current concerns playing on the slippage between the televised and the real." In the 1990s, Klonarides produced several videos with Joe Leonardi in conjunction with shows she curated at the Long Beach Museum of Art, including the hour-long "Gary Hill: Sites Recited" (1994, with Gary Hill), "Choice Encounters: Selections from the LBMA Permanent Collection" (1993), and "Relocations and Revisions: The Japanese-American Internment Reconsidered" (1991).

== Writing ==
Klonarides has written about art and media for journals, magazines, and institutions including the Hammer Museum, Santa Monica Museum of Art, Long Beach Museum of Art, the City of Los Angeles (COLA), The J. Paul Getty Trust, Ars Electronica, Edward Cella Art + Architecture, School of Visual Arts (New York), and Center for Photography at Woodstock, among others. She has authored catalogue essays on artists, including Anna Bialobroda, Henry Coombes, Julia Couzens, Meg Cranston, Theodora Varnay Jones, Hilja Keading, Nancy Macko, Richard Prince, Alex Slade, Coleen Sterritt, George Stone, Andy Wing, Bruce Yonemoto, and Etienne Zack. Her essays and reviews and interviews of artists and filmmakers Michel Auder, William Leavitt, Raúl Ruiz, Allen Ruppersberg, and Mungo Thomson have been published in Art Journal, BOMB, and X-TRA, among other publications.
