= Sterling Ruby =

American artist

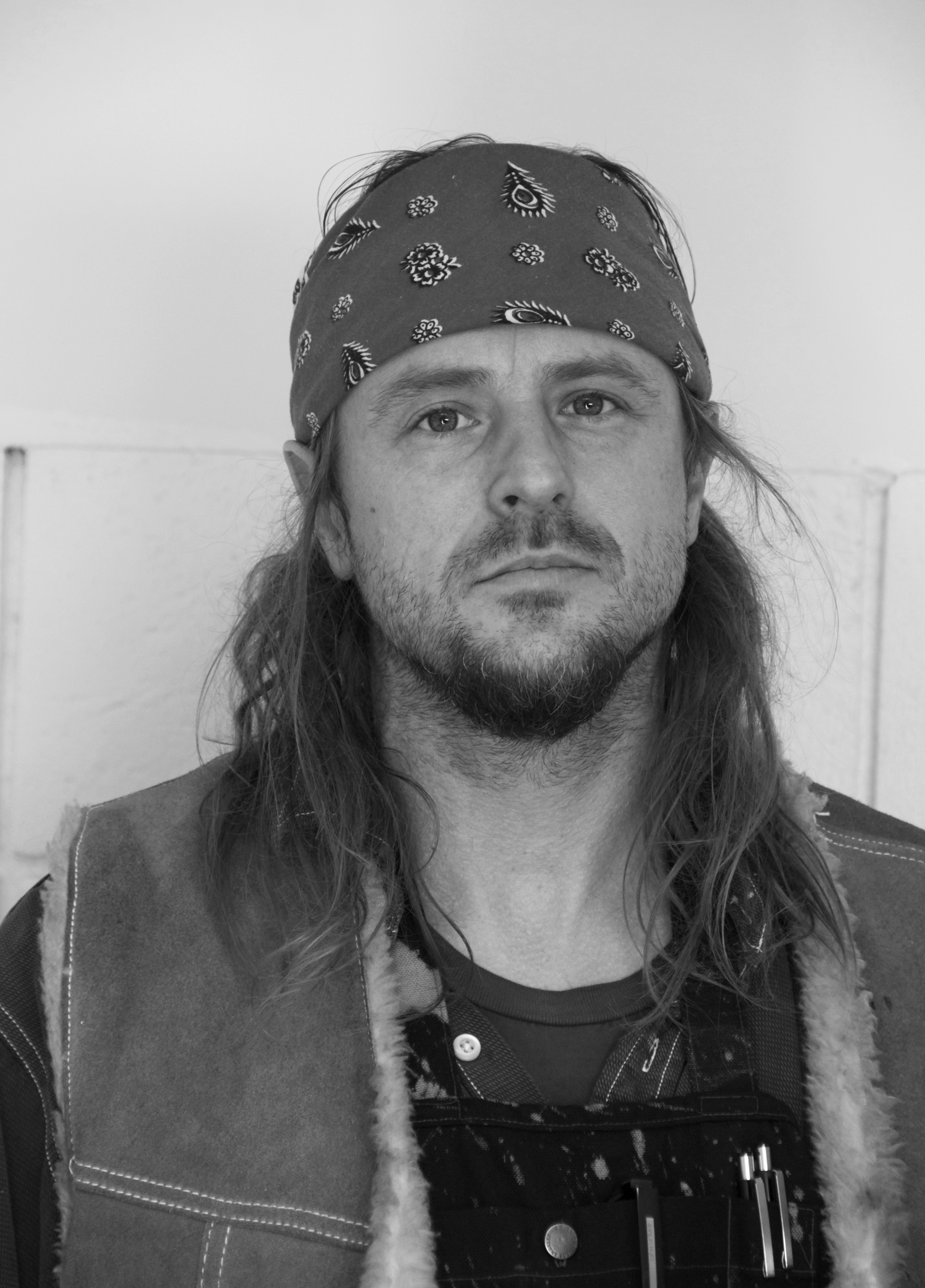
- Ruby in 2012
- Born: January 21, 1972 (age 54); Bitburg, West Germany
- Education: Pennsylvania College of Art & Design; Art Center College of Design; The Art Institute of Chicago
- Known for: Ceramics; collage; drawing; painting; textiles; photography; sculpture; video

Sterling Ruby (born January 21, 1972) is an American artist who works in a large variety of media including ceramics, painting, drawing, collage, sculpture, video, and textiles. Often, his work is presented in large and densely packed installations. The artist has cited a diverse range of sources and influences including aberrant psychologies (particularly schizophrenia and paranoia), urban gangs and graffiti, hip-hop culture, craft, punk, masculinity, violence, public art, prisons, globalization, American domination and decline, waste and consumption. In opposition to the minimalist artistic tradition and influenced by the ubiquity of urban graffiti, the artist's works often appear scratched, defaced, camouflaged, dirty, or splattered. Proclaimed as one of the most interesting artists to emerge this century by New York Times art critic Roberta Smith, Ruby's work examines the psychological space where individual expression confronts social constraint. Sterling Ruby currently lives and works in Los Angeles. His studio is located in Vernon, south of downtown Los Angeles.

== Early life and education ==
Sterling Ruby was born on an American military base in Bitburg, Germany to a Dutch mother and an American father. His family relocated to the United States shortly after his birth, first to Baltimore, Maryland, and then to the rural town of New Freedom, Pennsylvania. There he attended the largely agrarian Kennard-Dale High School. After graduating from high school, Ruby worked in construction in Washington D.C.

Ruby attended The Pennsylvania School of Art and Design, (now the Pennsylvania College of Art and Design, PCA&D). In 2002, he received a BFA from the School of the Art Institute of Chicago. While attending the Art Institute he worked for the Video Data Bank, then under the direction of Kate Horsfield. In 2003, he moved to Los Angeles to attend the MFA program at Art Center College of Design in Pasadena, California. While at Art Center he studied with artists Diana Thater and Richard Hawkins, and theorists Sylvère Lotringer and Laurence Rickels. While attending graduate school at Art Center he was the teaching assistant for artist Mike Kelley.

== Work ==
Collage

Collage plays a significant role in the artist's prolific and interdisciplinary practice. Formal and thematic concerns are reflected by an exhaustive range of subject matter which is developed over the course of a number of years. The titles of the collage series include Mapping, DRFTRS, TRANSCOMPOSITIONAL, SPCE, EXHM, and BC. The artist has described collage as an "illicit merger", suggesting a transgressive nature for the medium.

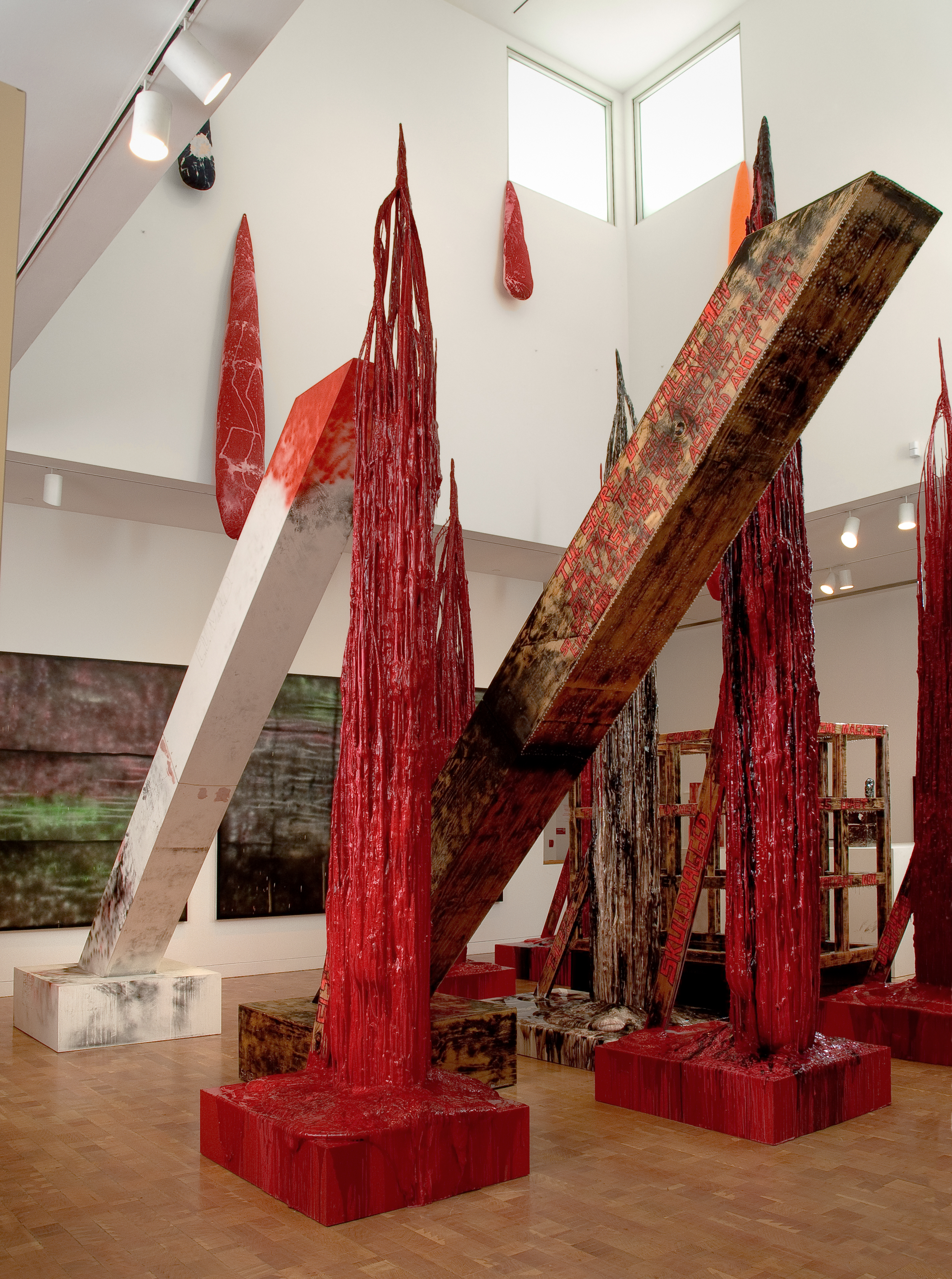
Sterling Ruby, SUPERMAX 2008, installation view, Museum of Contemporary Art, Los Angeles, Pacific Design Center

EXHM

In the series EXHM, titled with the artist's invented abbreviation for the word exhumation, The artist repurposes the large cardboard pieces used to protect the studio floor from the urethane that is poured during the creation of his urethane sculptures. Cutting into the cardboard and rearranging formal compositions he finalizes the works by inserting pictures of burial grounds, prescription packages and other found images as a way of creating an autobiographical archeology or dig site.

BC

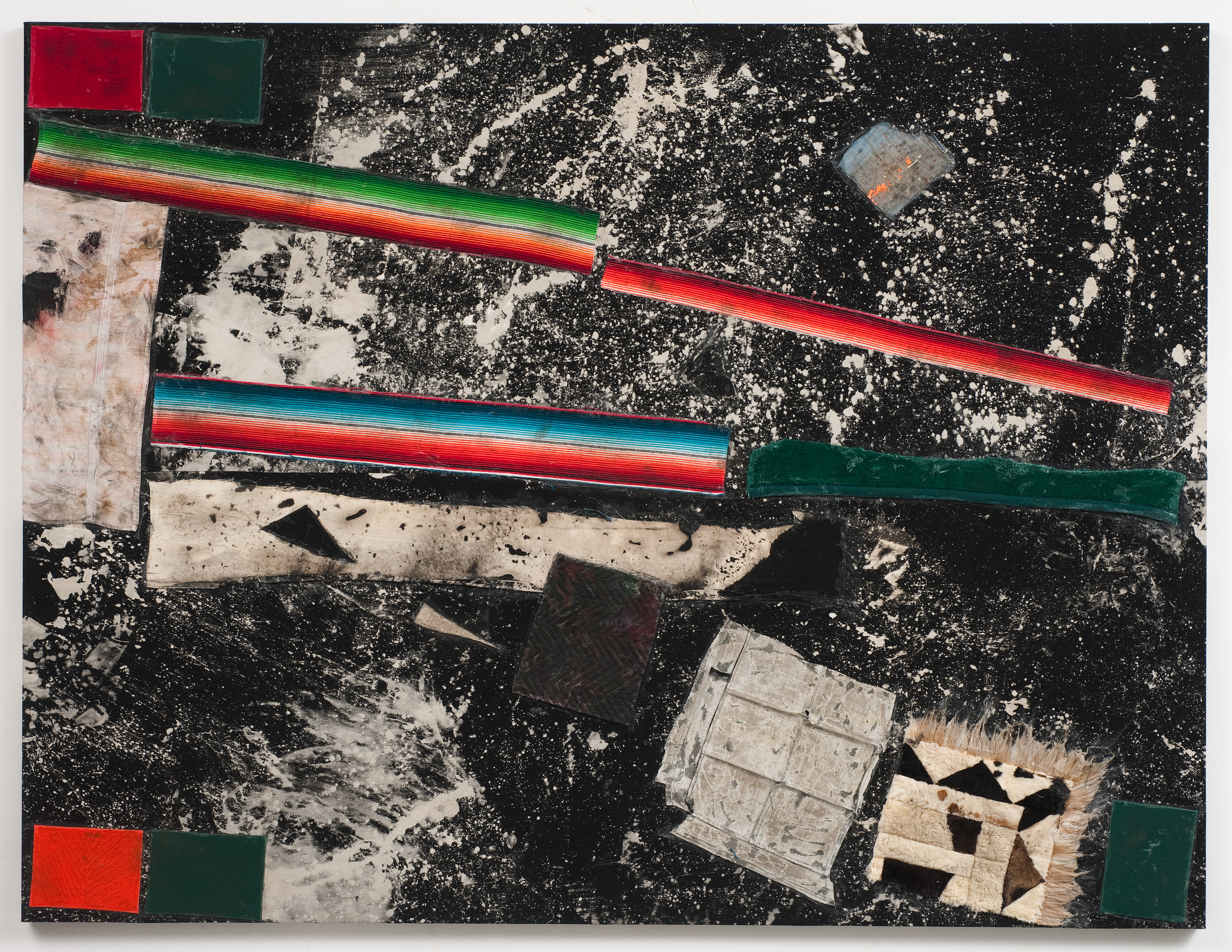
BC (3549) Sterling Ruby, Collage, 2011

His bleached denim and canvas collages are titled BC which refers simply to Bleach Collage, but also references the art historical dating reference BC (Before Christ) or BCE (Before the Common Era). For this series of works, the artist repurposes rags, fabric scraps, clothing, and denim that have personal as well as studio history. These patchwork collages are playful, almost pop-like, resembling the craft of quilt making. These works reference the utilitarian beauty of Gee's Bend quilts as well as Japanese Boro textiles.

ECLPSE

The ECLPSE collages are made from cardboard salvaged from the floor coverings in the artist's studio. The shapes are reminiscent of suns, moons and overlapping landscapes, are painted in bright, primary colors. Ruby has said of these compositions: 'They continue with themes, theories and concepts that have been central to my previous work, but I have been trying to make them abstract and formal, my attempt to connect to the historical lineage of Suprematism.'

SCALES

SCALES are constructed mobiles. These works, which the artist views as three-dimensional manifestations of his collages, feature identical monochrome shapes to those evident in the ECLPSE series. These cardboard shapes are juxtaposed with identifiable scraps of materials and objects from his studio.

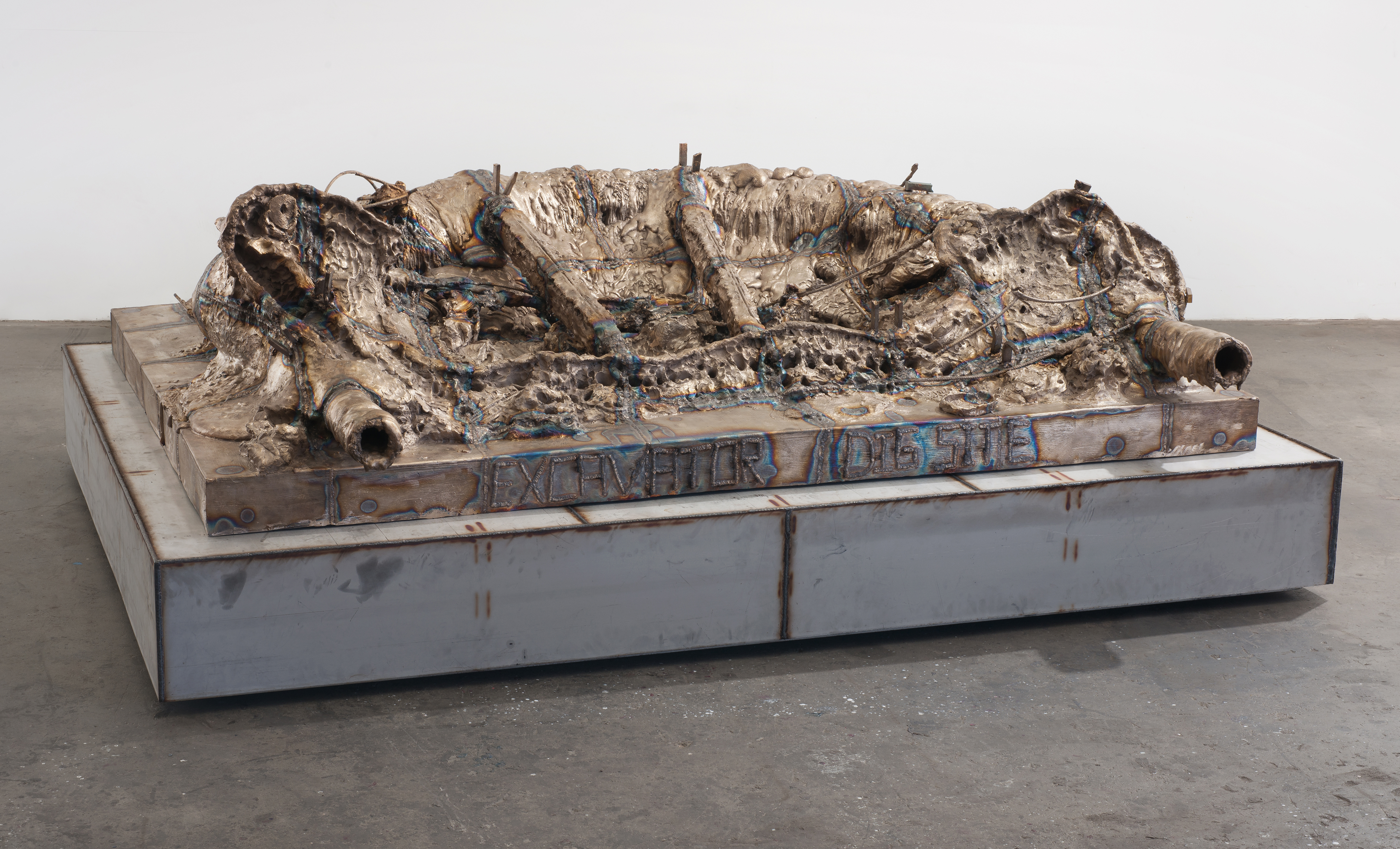
EXCAVATOR DIG SITE Sterling Ruby, Bronze, 2010

Bronzes

Ruby's large bronze sculptures are generally poured in smaller sections, which he then joins together in an almost quilt-like fashion. Traditionally, bronze casting foundries grind the joining welds out of the final sculpture to hide this step in the fabrication process. For his large bronze sculptures, Ruby forgoes grinding the welds, which retain a rainbow patina.

Double Candle (2018), bronze, at the Hirshhorn Museum and Sculpture Garden

Stoves

In 2012, a series of fully functional stoves of the artist's own design were produced. These stoves, executed in bronze, cast iron or steel, were based on the kind of cast iron pot-belly stoves found in farm houses. There is an autobiographical element to these works, as the artist grew up on a farm in rural Pennsylvania, that for a time was heated only by a wood-burning stove. The Stoves highlight Ruby's interest in themes of functionality and utilitarianism.

In 2013, the artist installed the 17-foot tall STOVE in a public square in Basel, Switzerland as part of Parcours, Art Basel. The stove was lit at the beginning of the fair, and a fire was maintained in the stove during the run of the fair.

A second series of four large scale stoves were exhibited as part of the 2015 Gwangju Biennial in Gwangju Korea. The stoves which stood about 17 feet high were installed at the entrance to the exhibition. A fire was maintained in the Stove during the run of the biennial.

In the fall of 2015, a set of four large black stoves was installed in the courtyard of the Musée de la Chasse et de la Nature in Paris, France.

Soft Sculptures

The artist's soft sculptures, made from fabric stuffed with fiber fill, take many forms. The artist has presented large vampire mouths and double vampire mouths with fabric blood drops that hang from their fabric teeth. Other forms include "husbands" modeled on a particular pillow shape that is sold commercially, and laying figures which resemble oversized human forms.

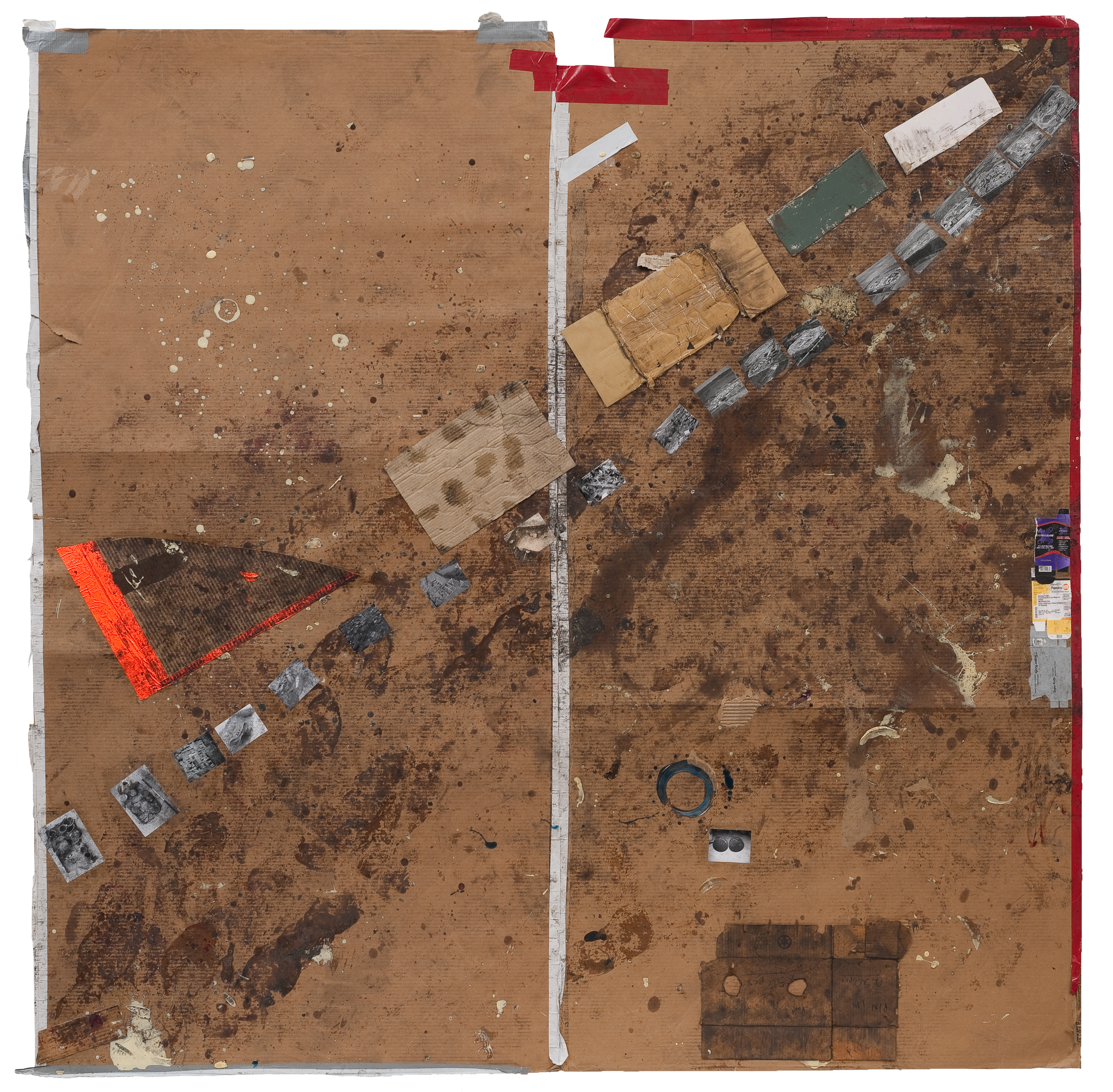
EXHM (3915) Sterling Ruby, Collage, 2012

Ceramics

A prominent component of his oeuvre, Sterling Ruby's ceramic work is informed by the California craft movement and German "hot lava" vessels from the 1970s as well as by the amateurish biomorphic shapes made in an art therapy class. His ceramic works feature thick, vivid glazes and charred and gouged surfaces on rudimentary forms resembling baskets, vessels, or body parts. In his Basin Theology series, basin-like vessels are filled with recycled fragments of earlier destroyed or damaged works. These works reference archaeological excavation sites. The fragmented pieces meld together with the application of glazes and repeated firing in the kiln.

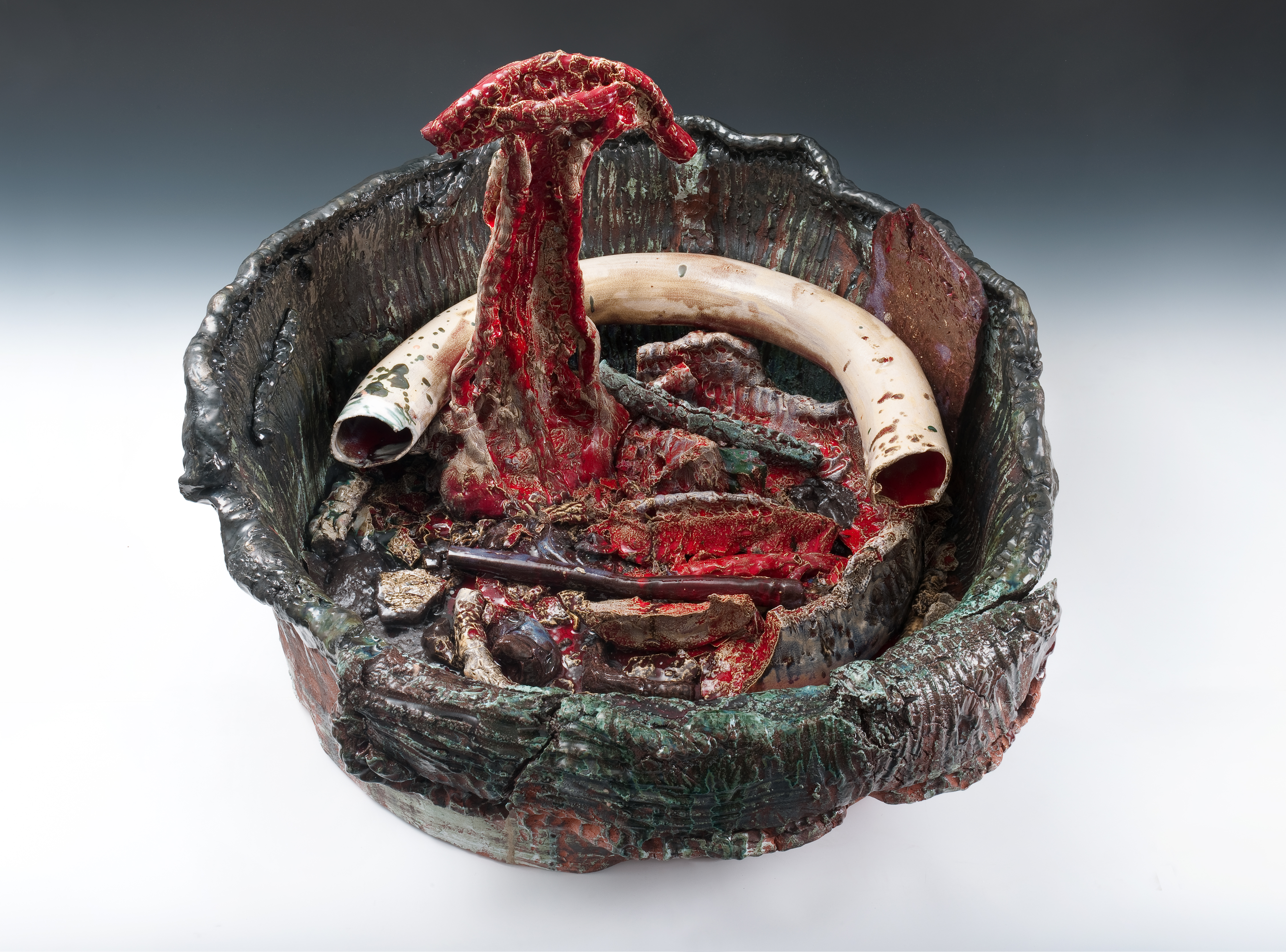
Basin Theology/Talwin+Ritalin Sterling Ruby, Ceramic, 2013

Paintings

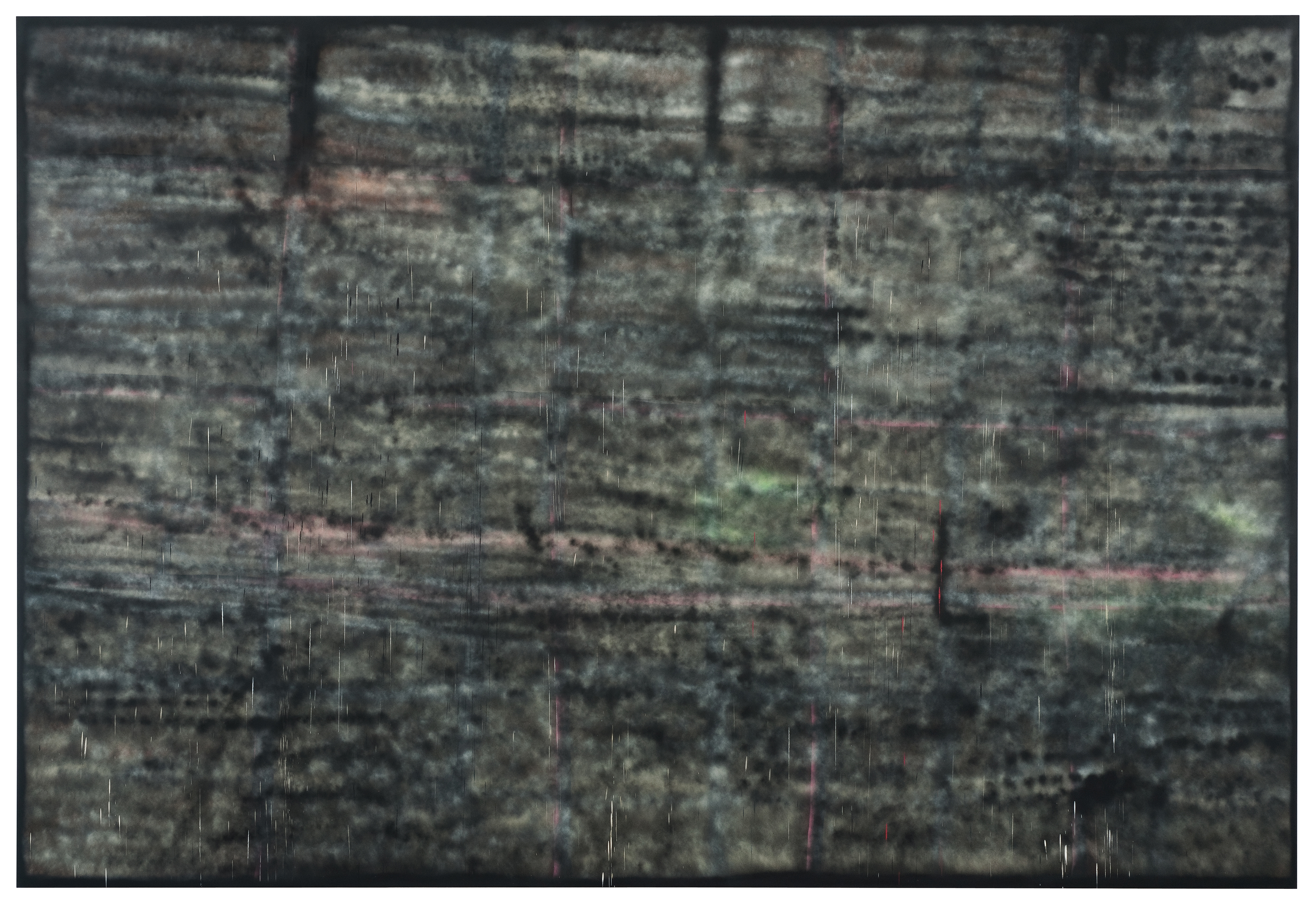
SP181 Sterling Ruby, 2011

Of all the disparate forms in Ruby's practice, his paintings are the most formally abstract. They are all titled with the initials SP and then a number. His large color-field canvases, made entirely with spray paint, use a color palette ranging from deep blacks to acid greens and pinks, and appear hallucinogenic and gauzy. The paintings are influenced by the sociological implications of urban demarcation, vandalism and the power struggles associated with gang tagging. The artist has suggested that layers of gang tagging in Los Angeles, evidence of clashes over territory, eventually turn abstract, ceasing to have a clear order, and in the end losing their original meanings and authority.

Urethane sculptures

The artist has created a series of large, poured urethane sculptures, collectively titled Monument Stalagmites, in blood red, intense blacks, and other vibrant colors. These sculptures, which can be up to eighteen feet tall, resemble the stalactites and stalagmites that can be found in caves. The pieces are created by the accumulation and pouring of a quick drying poly-urethane over an underlying armature. The pieces are presented on bases and have a wooden buttress, often inscribed with text, that the artist refers to as a crutch. They have been described as monumental gestures and reflect the artist's declared intention to depict the moment when malleability becomes frozen.

Video

Walter Robinson described the artist's video Transient Trilogy this way: "Transient Trilogy (2005)… comes the closest to being a real film, with an actor, a setting and something of a narrative scheme. Ruby himself plays a bum, who transits a marginal landscape, neither nature nor manmade, where he occupies himself crafting what can only be called artworks from string, cast-offs and other bits of trash. In one scene, he makes a minor splatter painting on a rock with red fingernail polish."

Ruby has long explored the architecture of prisons, and in 2019 he exhibited STATE, a single-channel video projection of aerial views of the 35 adult state prisons of the California Department of Corrections and Rehabilitation (CDCR). In the video, we see prisons dotted across the landscape of California; rolling hills, deserts, forests, farmland and rural areas open up onto sites that resemble cities. The artists draws a connection to the ways in which war zones and conflict areas are shown in the media, via distanced surveillance footage or drone reconnaissance. A repetitive, structural rhythm is created as the video cuts back and forth between the landscapes and the sites of the prison grounds. Ruby composed and performed the accompanying sound track.

QUILTS

At his Los Angeles studio, Sterling Ruby bleaches large rolls of canvas and denim to use for his fabric collages and sculptures. Taking inspiration from the quilters of Gee's Bend in Alabama, as well as Boro textiles from Japan, he makes quilts from scraps of the bleached denim and other materials left over from the production of other artworks.

FLAGS

In the series FLAGS, the artist creates quilt-like work on a monumental scale. These large scale wall-hangings often resemble the American flag.

The artist designed a large-scale quilt that served as a backdrop for the traveling performances of the L.A. Dance Projects: Murder Ballades. The backdrop, sewn together from long bolts of bleached denim and canvas, measured 8.2 by 12.1 meters [27 by 40 ft].

The artist also created a large fabric backdrop for the set of Basilica Soundscape 2014, a two-day music festival held in Hudson, NY.

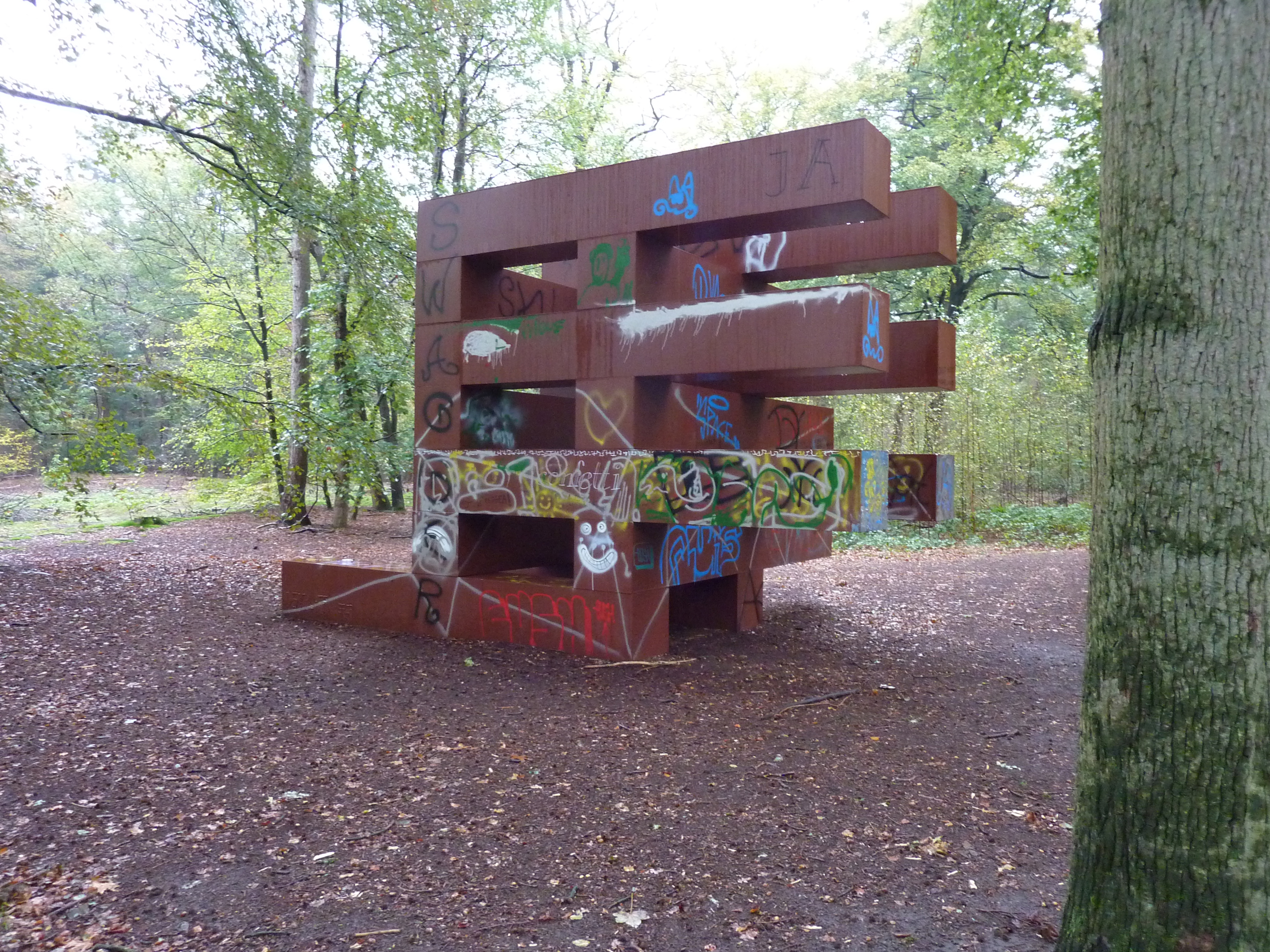
DSM-IV-TR/FEEDFACE #654321 installed at Lustwarande'11, Tilburg, The Netherlands

Public works

In 2011, the artist presented a set of large free standing sculptures in a public square in Lisbon, Portugal. One of the pieces presented was a large painted metal structure made up of individually stacked monoliths. This piece was later exhibited in a sculpture garden in the Netherlands. As part of this exhibition the artist encouraged visitors to deface the sculpture with their own graffiti.

In an interview with Steve Pulimood, the artist said, "Over the past few years I've done many sculptures that have had inscribed surfaces, gestures on a surface that are not only mediated by me the artist, but also by the public that has access to it. I have seen Serras with that kind of tagging, and for me it informs that irrational feeling you just mentioned … it makes the work itself more vulnerable. I've always liked that antagonism that public sculpture provides."

Pusha T

Ruby designed the cover for "Diet Coke" and "Neck & Wrist", Pusha T's lead singles for his album. He also designed the cover for Pusha's album, "It's Almost Dry".

== Fashion and design ==
Collaborations with Raf Simons

In 2008, Sterling Ruby designed the interior for clothing designer Raf Simons' Tokyo store, using images of bleached fabric to create a splattered wallpaper that covered its walls and ceilings.

In 2009, Simons used denim bleached by the artist to create a collection of denim wear jeans and jackets.

In 2012, Simons created satin fabrics with images of four of Sterling Ruby's recent paintings. Raf Simons created three dresses and a coat from these fabrics. They were presented as part of Raf Simons' debut haute couture collection for Dior. In 2013, these dresses were exhibited as part of the Esprit Dior exhibition at the Museum of Contemporary Art in Shanghai.

On January 15, 2014, Ruby and Simons collaborated on Raf Simons/Sterling Ruby Fall/Winter 2014 menswear collection presented during Paris Fashion Week.

In 2017, after Simons moved over to Calvin Klein, Ruby was enlisted to redesign the interior of their New York showroom, as well as the brand's Paris headquarters. Ruby also designed two runways for Calvin Klein, Calvin Klein RTW Fall 2017 in February 2017, and RTW Spring 2018 runway in September 2017. Ruby also reimagined the interior of Calvin Klein’s Madison Avenue flagship store, painting the walls safety yellow, constructing matching yellow floor-to-ceiling scaffolding and filling the space with geometric plinths and large-scale soft sculpture candles.

In 2020, Raf Simons announced a redux collection. It featured some clothing from the Fall Winter 2014 Sterling Ruby collection.

S.R. STUDIO. LA. CA.

In Spring 2019, Ruby announced the launch of a ready-to-wear collection S.R. STUDIO. LA. CA. [16] The collection has evolved from ten years of experimentation and development in Ruby’s work in soft sculpture, quilts, backdrops and garments. Ruby described the collection, saying “I’ve always been interested in the behavioral power that comes with clothing. For years I have been privately exploring garments as a medium, as something that impacts the way one can think, feel, and move.”

Sterling Ruby’s designs were unique as they incorporated much of his past contemporary art skills and works. In addition, he added artwork, specifically photographs, from his wife Melanie Schiff. These images were of candles and weeds, and he printed them on silk dresses. Onto his denim pieces, he added U.S flag decals which reflected particular sculptures he created in the past. He also added a print of another one of his past sculptures onto some garments; this pattern was of animal skulls in different types of wigs. When Ruby described the difference between the production of fashion and art, he said he doesn’t see any difference in the making. But he did say he finds the creation of fashion more rewarding as you see people walking around in the world wearing art you have created.

S.R. STUDIO. LA. CA. debuted in June 2019 at Pitti Immagine Uomo 96 in Florence, Italy. Ruby was the featured Special Guest designer on June 13.

== Exhibitions ==
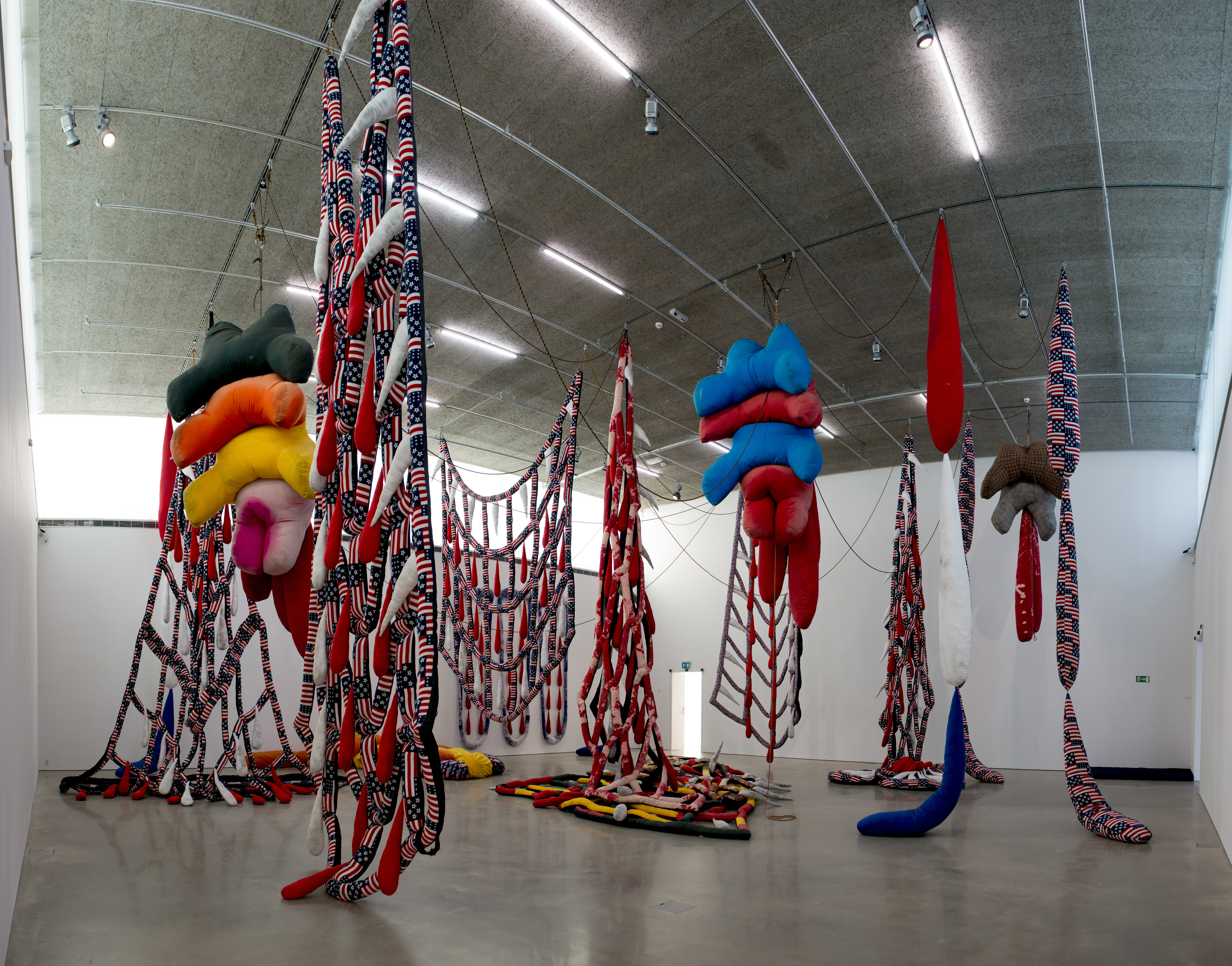
Sterling Ruby, SOFT WORK, installation view, Bonniers Konsthall, Stockholm, Sweden, 2012

SUPERMAX 2008

For "SUPERMAX 2008," a solo exhibition curated by Philipp Kaiser at the Museum of Contemporary Art, Los Angeles, Pacific Design Center, Ruby correlated the architecture of the museum with the architecture of the California prison system.

"SUPERMAX" is a reference to the special units of American maximum security prisons where prisoners in solitary confinement can be on lockdown for up to 23 hours a day. The dense installation of "SUPERMAX 2008" included poured urethane sculptures, aerosol paintings, geometric sculptures made of formica or brass, and soft sculptures in the form of blood drops and collages. The expressive exhibition distanced the artist's work from the ideology of Minimal art and integrated the seemingly disparate artworks included in Ruby's art practice.

SOFTWORK

In 2012-2013 the artist presented the exhibition titled SOFT WORK at the Geneva Contemporary Art Center, FRAC Champagne-Ardenne, Bonniers Konsthall in Stockholm, and MACRO in Rome. This traveling exhibition consisted of soft sculptures in various forms.

A catalog to accompany this exhibition was published by Buchhandlung Walther König. The works from the SOFT WORK exhibition were acquired by the Museum of Contemporary Art, Los Angeles as a complete set in 2015.

Ruby had exhibited at institutions including the Ullens Center for Contemporary Art, Beijing; Museum of Modern Art, New York; Museum of Contemporary Art, Chicago; Institute of Contemporary Art, Philadelphia; Walker Art Center, Minneapolis; Garage Centre for Contemporary Culture, Moscow; Saatchi Gallery, London; MACRO, Rome; Baibokov Projects, Moscow. His work was included in the 2014 Whitney Biennial, the 2014 Taipei Biennial, and the 2014 Gwangju Biennial, and Made in L.A. 2016: a, the, though, only at The Hammer Museum.

In addition to his solo exhibition at the Museum of Contemporary Art, Los Angeles ("SUPERMAX 2008"), Ruby has been the subject of solo exhibitions at the Drawing Center, New York; La Galleria d'Arte Moderna e Contemporanea, Bergamo, Italy, and the Winterpalais in Vienna. The traveling exhibition SOFT WORK was exhibited at FRAC Champagne-Ardenne, Riems, France and the Centre d'Art Contemporain, Geneva, Switzerland; and Bonniers Konsthall, Stockholm, Sweden and Museo d'Arte Contemporanea, Rome, Italy.

In 2019, Ruby's solo exhibition Sterling Ruby: Sculpture at the Nasher Sculpture Center was the first museum exhibition to survey the great variety of sculptural work of one the most significant contemporary artists working today. The exhibition featured nearly 30 large-scale sculptures spanning his career.

== Notable works in public collections ==
- Dihedral (2006), Seattle Art Museum
- Pelvic Mirror/Peace Head Version (2007), Los Angeles County Museum of Art
- Alpha Tier 2 (2008), Museum of Modern Art, New York
- Inscribed Plinth/LA Shotgun LX13/C. Noland Conjugal Visit (2008), Museum of Contemporary Art, Chicago
- Basin Theology/Nicap (2010), Nasher Sculpture Center, Dallas
- SOFT WORK (2011-2013), Museum of Contemporary Art, Los Angeles
- SP257 (2013), The Guggenheim, New York
- SP267 (2013), San Francisco Museum of Modern Art
- Vampire 108 (2013), Montreal Museum of Fine Arts
- Basin Theology/CRL-40.941 NOMAD (2014), Whitney Museum of American Art, New York
- Basin Theology/Excited Red Excedrin (2015), Tate, London
- The Jungle (2016), Centre Georges Pompidou, Paris
- Double Candle (2018), Hirshhorn Museum and Sculpture Garden, Washington, DC
