= Hilja =

Female given name

Hilja is an Estonian and Finnish feminine given name.

== Notable people ==
Notable people with the name include:

- Hilja Riipinen (1883–1966), Finnish politician
- Hilja Haapala (1877–1958), Finnish writer
- Hilja Keading (born 1960), American video artist
- Hilja Varem (born 1934), Estonian actress
