= Cyrus Dunham =

Cyrus Dunham may refer to:

- Cyrus Grace Dunham (born 1992), American writer and activist
- Cyrus L. Dunham (1817–1877), American attorney and politician
