= Are.na =

Social network and creative research platform

- Website type: Social network
- Available in: English
- Founders: Charles Broskoski; Daniel Pianetti; Chris Barley; Chris Sherron
- Website: are.na
- Commercial: Yes
- Registration: Required to post, follow, or be followed
- Launched: August 2011
- Current status: Active

Are.na is an online social networking community and creative research platform founded by Charles Broskoski, Daniel Pianetti, Chris Barley, and Chris Sherron. Are.na was built as a successor to hypertext projects like Ted Nelson's Xanadu, and as an ad-free alternative to social networks like Facebook, forgoing "likes," "favorites," or "shares" in its design. Are.na allows users to compile uploaded and web-clipped "blocks" into different "channels," and has been described as a "vehicle for conscious Internet browsing," "playlists, but for ideas," and a "toolkit for assembling new worlds."

== Features and community ==
Are.na is popular amongst designers, artists, and architects including Cory Arcangel, Michael Bell-Smith, Margaret Lee, Laurel Schwulst, Emily Segal, Mindy Seu, Martine Syms, Allan Yu, and others who publicly cite Are.na as a tool in their creative process. Are.na's blog, written and curated by Meg Miller, includes essays about Are.na's research and publishing tools as well as noteworthy or "featured" user channels. Are.na-specific terms include:

- Blocks: uploaded or web-clipped links, images, text, PDF, video, or other file formats.
- Channels: file folders for organizing blocks

== Revenue model ==
Are.na is free to peruse but finances itself by upselling premium accounts with the ability to upload an unlimited number of blocks. It also sells branded apparel on its store.

Unlike Pinterest, Are.na does not finance itself through advertising or user data collection.

== History ==
Co-founder Charles Broskoski began working for Rhizome's John Michael Boling and Sapient Corporation's Stuart Moore in the early 2010s, coding prototypes of a platform which would containerize knowledge into "informational building blocks." Soon after, Broskoski brought artist Damon Zucconi and K-HOLE's Dena Yago onto the project. Broskoski, Yago, and Zucconi eventually split off to found Are.na, soon joined by co-founder Chris Sherron (also of K-HOLE) and Dan Brewster. Broskoski set out to build an open-ended community tool, with Ted Nelson's Computer Lib/Dream Machines and hypertext project Xanadu as major influences on Are.na's founding and design.

== Collaborations ==
In 2015, Are.na worked with the Guggenheim Museum on the Åzone Futures Market. The museum's first online exhibition, curated by Troy Conrad Therrien, Åzone Futures Market allowed visitors to the site to invest cåin, a digital currency, in different technology-driven visions of the future.

Two years later, Are.na partnered with the Chicago Architecture Biennial, building out their blog alongside ArchDaily, Archinect, and Architizer. Are.na has also partnered with the Manhattan Museum of Arts and Design, New Inc. incubator, the Vilém Flusser archives, and artists Carson Salter and David Hilmer Rex.

== See also ==
- List of social networking services
