= Emily Segal =

American artist

Emily Segal is an American artist, writer, and creative director, born in 1988. She is a founding member of the art collective K-HOLE, a trend forecasting group. She has lectured on branding and consumer culture at the DLD conference, MoMA PS1, the Serpentine Gallery, and TEDxVaduz and writing has been featured in e-flux, Frieze, Texte zur Kunst, Flash Art, Dazed, Mousse, and 032c. Her first novel, Mercury Retrograde, was published in 2020.

== Early life and education ==
Segal was born and raised in New York, where she attended the Dalton School. She graduated with a BA from Brown University.

== Works ==
Along with Greg Fong, Sean Monahan, Chris Sherron, and Dena Yago, Segal founded and was involved with the art collective K-HOLE from 2011 to 2016. In 2014, the trend forecasting group released a trend report that coined the term normcore: a utopian word to describe the individual longing for community that leads to mass adaptability. The term has often been misconstrued to signify the type of aesthetic fashion choice that writer Fiona Duncan describes as "the kind of dad-brand non-style you might have once associated with Jerry Seinfeld, but transposed on a Cooper Union student with William Gibson glasses." The concept has less to do with form and more about content and Segal notes that normcore is "about adaptability and being able to go into a lot of different communities at once."

Segal became the first creative director of Genius in 2014.

In 2017, Segal and Martti Kalliala started a collaborative consultancy and think tank called Nemesis. The agency, based in Berlin, Helsinki, New York City, and Los Angeles, focuses on research on fashion, subculture, urbanism, technology, language, design, and death. Clients have included Rimowa, Virgil Abloh, and Full Node, True Religion Brand Jeans, Buffy, MTV, Art Basel, and more.

Segal's debut novel, Mercury Retrograde, was published in late 2020 and was featured in The New York Times's New & Noteworthy book picks for 2020. The novel is set in New York City between the post-Occupy movement and pre-Trump era and follows the artist/trend forecaster working for an internet start up.

Segal, Hannah Baer, and Cyrus Dunham founded Deluge Books, an experimental queer and pulp publishing group, in 2020.
