= Baskerville + Watson =

Art gallery in New York City

Coordinates: 40.724372°N 73.997379°W

Baskerville + Watson was an American contemporary art gallery located in New York City, New York, United States from 1980 to 1988.

== History ==
Baskerville + Watson, incorporated by Lewis Baskerville and Simon Watson in 1980–1981, was first located on 24 W. 57th Street, New York City, New York. The gallery typically exhibited younger artists who had yet to show above 14th St. The 57th Street gallery, as well as its subsequent SoHo venue and Baskerville's PH in the Majestic, were three of Tod Williams Billie Tsien Architects' earliest realized projects. In 1982, Baskerville + Watson opened with a two-person show of works by Lauren Ewing and Steve Wood followed by the two-person exhibition of Deborah Kass and Stephen Ellis, his first ever exhibition. In 1983, Carole Ann Klonarides, whose video works are associated with the "Pictures Generation," curated "Borrowed Time," which combined works by known artists Nam June Paik, Norman Rockwell and William Wegman with those of then emerging artists Louise Lawler, Richard Prince, and Aura Rosenberg. This led to Klonarides' becoming gallery director. The Metropolitan Museum of Art Collection owns a matchbook produced by Louise Lawler for "Borrowed Time."

In 1985, the gallery moved to the floor above the Curt Marcus Gallery in the 578 Broadway Building. Although Baskerville + Watson did not represent artists at first, several had multiple exhibitions: Sherrie Levine (1983, 1985), Richard Prince(1983, 1984), Carroll Dunham (1985, 1986), R. M. Fischer (1983, 1985), Deborah Kass (1982,1984,1986) and John Torreano.

The gallery's influence was noted in an ARTnews article called "Downtown Boomtown."

The gallery closed in 1988. Lew Baskerville moved to California. In 1989, Simon Watson opened Simon Watson Gallery on Lafayette Street in Little Italy.

== Critical response ==
Many of the gallery's exhibitions were reviewed in The New York Times, Artforum, Art in America and the Village Voice. Several artists who exhibited there are discussed in Jerry Saltz's seminal book, Beyond Boundaries: New York's New Art (1986).

== Artists exhibited ==
- Ericka Beckman
- Dike Blair
- Carroll Dunham
- Louise Fishman
- Deborah Kass
- Sherrie Levine
- Richard Prince
- Ettore Spalletti
- John Torreano

== See also ==
- Contemporary art gallery
- List of contemporary artists
