= Deluge Books =

American experimental press

Deluge Books is an experimental press founded in 2020 in Los Angeles. The press publishes poetry, fiction, essays, and intergenre books.

== History ==
Deluge Books is an American mass experimental queer press co-founded by Emily Segal, Cyrus Dunham, and Hannah Baer in 2020.

Deluge published Jeanetta Rich's debut book of poetry, Black Venus Fly Trap, in 2021. The writer performed a poem, Love Poem, to celebrate the release of the book for Texte zur Kunst.

In 2020, Deluge Books published Emily Segal's first novel, Mercury Retrograde, which was listed as a "New & Noteworthy" book by The New York Times and Artnet's 2020 "Holiday Reading List." The book follows a young artist and futurist who traverses through New York City after the Occupy protests and before the 2016 election while working for a mysterious tech start-up.

In 2022, K. Allado-McDowell's Amor Cringe which is described in Wired magazine as a "deepfake autofiction," written by both the author and artificial intelligence software, GPT-3. Writer and scholar McKenzie Wark praised the novel storytelling noting that the author and GPT-3 make, "Sentences that are genius or dumb as a box of hammers, or both, or neither. Delightful like dime-store candy, or a lighter you found on the ground that works.” Later that year, Irene Silt released one book of poetry, My Pleasure, on love, sex, and bodies, and one book of essays, The Tricking Hour, about sex workers, intimacy, and time.
