= Lyn Blumenthal =

American video artist

- Born: 1949
- Died: 1988 (aged 38–39)
- Known for: Video art
- Memorials: Lyn Blumenthal Memorial Fund

Lyn Blumenthal (1949–1988) was an American video artist and writer. She and Kate Horsfield founded the Video Data Bank in 1976.

== Biography ==
Blumenthal was born in 1949 in Chicago, Illinois. Her parents were Sunoll and Frima Horwitch Blumenthal. In 1976, while attending the School of the Art Institute of Chicago, she and Horsfield founded the Video Data Bank to conserve their taped interviews with video artists. She graduated with a Master of Fine Arts degree in 1976.

In the 1980s Blumenthal was examining the politics of media. Dedicated to the application of feminist theory to video practice, Blumenthal's early 80s art tapes explore issues of female identity and sexuality as a crisis of representation. Her 1984 video Arcade, in collaboration with Carole Ann Klonarides and the painter Ed Paschke, was included in the 1989 touring exhibition Making Their Mark: Women Artists Move into the Mainstream, 1970-1985. One of her final projects was released in 1987. It is a six-part series of videos entitled What Does She Want?, collecting materials related to female identity and its relationship with media. It includes in its final videotape a collection of interviews of women artists (Yvonne Rainer, Marsha Rosler, Christine Choy, and Nancy Spero) edited by Blumenthal.

Blumenthal died of a heart attack on July 21, 1988, in Manhattan, New York City. In her honor the Video Data Bank created the Lyn Blumenthal Memorial Fund to support artists in the media arts.
