= Hannah Baer =

American writer, and therapist

hannah baer is an American writer, clinical psychologist, and cultural critic. She is the author of the memoir Trans Girl Suicide Museum (2019) and a co-founder of the experimental queer press Deluge Books alongside Emily Segal and Cyrus Dunham.

== Career ==
Baer has worked as a volunteer organizer for Jews for Racial and Economic Justice (JFREJ).

In 2019, baer published her debut memoir, Trans Girl Suicide Museum, through Hesse Press. The book combines personal narrative with cultural and social critique, delving into topics such as gender identity, mental health, and the influence of internet culture.

Baer has contributed essays and articles to several publications, including: Jewish Currents, The Drift, Artforum, Los Angeles Review of Books, The Guardian, and Parapraxis. Baer is also known for championing artists such as Pe Ferreira, Doron Langberg, Ser Serpas, Nash Glynn, Oscar yi Hou, Pippa Garner, Paul Yore, and Sam Penn. In 2023, a nude self-portrait she made with an AI-powered deepfake website was featured on the cover of Artforum. She has read and lectured widely, including at London Trans+ Pride, The Poetry Project, Pioneer Works, Artists Space, Camp Trans in the UK, and Lunchmeat Festival in Prague.

Baer's forthcoming book, The Life of the Party, is set to be published by Farrar, Straus and Giroux in 2027. The book has been described as part instruction manual on hosting gatherings and part cultural memoir, exploring how parties can reshape our relationships and social structures.

== Publications ==
- baer, hannah (2019). Kelly, Clare (ed.). Trans Girl Suicide Museum. Hesse Press. ISBN 9781948434065.
- baer, hannah (May 1, 2020). "viral pandemic slash collective crisis moodboard". Artforum, Vol. 58, No. 9.
- baer, hannah (July 26, 2021). "Stop calling people 'toxic'. Here's why". The Guardian. ISSN 0261-3077.
- baer, hannah (November 11, 2021). "Peter Coleman's "The Way Out" and the Roots of Political Polarization". Los Angeles Review of Books.
- baer, hannah (December 1, 2021). "Dance Until The World Ends". Artforum, Vol. 60, No. 4.
- baer, hannah (Summer 2022). "Therapy Was Never Secular". Jewish Currents.
- baer, hannah (June 1, 2023). "Projective Reality". Artforum, Vol. 61, No. 10.
- baer, hannah (September 7, 2023). "On Loneliness". Broadcast. Pioneer Works.
- baer, hannah (2024). "The Shadow Self". Jordan Peele's Us. Los Angeles, CA: Inventory Press. ISBN 978-1941753330.
- baer, hannah (2025). "The Phone Thieves". In Beery, Zoë; Mak, Geoffrey; Wark, McKenzie (eds.). Writing on Raving: An Anthology. New York: OR Books. ISBN 9781682196281.
- baer, hannah (December 2025). "Loving the World on Fire". Parapraxis, No. 7. The Psychosocial Foundation.
