= K-HOLE =

Trend forecasting group

- Type: Trend forecasting group
- Founded: 2010
- Founders: Greg Fong; Sean Monahan; Chris Sherron; Emily Segal; Dena Yago
- Defunct: 2016
- Headquarters: New York City, United States
- Website: khole.net

K-HOLE was a trend forecasting artist collective founded by Greg Fong, Sean Monahan, Chris Sherron, Emily Segal, and Dena Yago. The group operated between 2011 and 2016 and was based in New York City.

== Reports ==
K-HOLE has issued five publications as trend forecasting reports. Each report is in the style of a consumer trend forecasting report and reproduced for free as a .pdf file.

The first trend forecasting report, "K-HOLE #1: Fragmoretation: A Report on Visibility" was released in 2011 at and was made available via 100 rubber Livestrong-style bracelet USB drives as well as online. The second, "K-HOLE #2: Prolasticity: A Report on Patience,” launched at MoMA PS1 and was distributed on USB dog tag necklaces. The third report, "K-HOLE #3: The K-HOLEBrand Anxiety Matrix" surveyed case studies on Isabel Marant at Internal Wedge Sneakers, Globster, the antisocial networking, deodorant aka Stankonia, and reproduction hacks with the Mirena IUD.

In 2013, K-HOLE published, "Youth Mode: A Report On Freedom," as part of the 89plus marathon at the Serpentine Gallery in London. The report was made produced alongside Box 1824, a research organization based in São Paulo. The report addressed the use of generational branding, such as the mass marketable appeal of the hipster as outsider, even though the hipster was fashionable at the time. K-HOLE offered alternative sensibilities, like Normcore, the adaptability to socialize between various social groups and niche consumers. Soon after the report's release, the term Normcore went viral. It was rendered into a fashion term that corresponded with basic t-shirts, washed out jeans, white New Balance sneakers, amongst other markers.

In 2015, K-HOLE released its fifth report, “K-HOLE #5: A Report on Doubt,” which focused on the use of chaos magic and positive thinking.

Though K-HOLE is now largely inactive, some of its members went on to be founding members of Are.na. It is a research tool and social network.

== Brand consulting ==
K-HOLE has done brand consulting for Coach, Kickstarter, MTV, and the New Museum, alongside Ryan Trecartin, for the triennial "Surround Audience."
