= Dena Yago =

- Born: 1988 (age 37–38)
- Education: Columbia University
- Known for: Graphic Design and sculpture
- Movement: Post-internet art

Dena Yago (born 1988) is an artist, poet, and writer who lives and works in New York. She is known for being a co-founder in the trend forecasting art collective K-HOLE, which coined the term 'normcore.' She also helped to found are.na, a research tool and social network.

Yago has exhibited art with galleries and institutions such as JTT Gallery, Frans Hals Musemum, Derosia (formerly known as Bodega), Force Majeure, and the Hammer Museum.

Her writing has appeared in e-flux journal, Flash Art, and frieze magazine. In 2019 she released a book of poems and photographs titled Fade the Lure, which documents her experience working with and living alongside emotional support dogs in Los Angeles.

== Education and career ==
Yago studied art at Columbia University, and graduated in 2010. After graduating, she worked for a law firm in downtown Manhattan. She currently works as a cultural strategist in New York City.

In an article Yago wrote for e-Flux in 2017, "On Ketamine and Added Value," she described the context of institutional critique and relational aesthetics that defned artistic education for her generation: "This education championed the model of “artist as x,” or artist as performing a role—whether it be artist as cook, artist as bad boy, artist as gentleman farmer, or artist as sociopath—from a position of critical distance. Similar to homo economicus, the primary function of “artist as x” is to utilize and leverage all possible identities, situations, and social relations for their own benefit. From this accumulative imperative emerged practices where every bender was a durational performance and every broken bottle an artifact of critical engagement. Out of this educational model came Times Bar and New Theater in Berlin, the vitriolic blog Jerry Magoo, and, in my own case, a trend-forecasting group named K-HOLE. Relational aesthetics began to look a lot more like aspirational aesthetics, through the aestheticization of trolling, waste, usage, consumption, and the role played by “artist as consumer.”
