= Carroll Dunham =

American painter (born 1949)

- Born: 1949 (age 76–77); New Haven, Connecticut, U.S.
- Education: Trinity College
- Known for: Painting, drawing, printmaking
- Spouse: Laurie Simmons
- Children: Lena Dunham (daughter); Cyrus Dunham (child)
- Awards: Guggenheim Fellowship, American Academy in Rome
- Website: carrolldunham.net

Carroll Dunham (born November 5, 1949) is an American painter. Working since the late 1970s, Dunham's career reached critical renown in the 1980s when he first exhibited with Baskerville + Watson, a decade during which many artists returned to painting. He is known for his conceptual approach to painting and drawing and his interest in exploring the relationship between abstraction and figuration.

Of his body of work, Johanna Burton writes, "Dunham's career can be characterized by its rigorous indefinability, as his works dip freely into the realms of abstraction, figuration, surrealism, graffiti, pop, even cartoons, without ever settling loyally into any one of them." David Pagel, in a Los Angeles Times review intended to be complimentary, described his paintings as "vulgar beyond belief..."

== Early life ==
Dunham was born in New Haven, Connecticut in 1949. His parents were Carroll Dunham IV (1919-1995), a Harvard-educated poultry farmer and residential realtor "active in trade associations, politics, and civic affairs" who "came from great wealth, which he had squandered on a series of misguided investments," and Mount Holyoke College and Yale School of Nursing alumna Carol Marguerite (1915-2000), née Reynolds, a nurse and realtor. He grew up in Old Lyme, a hotbed for American impressionism in the early 20th century. His aunt was a Sunday painter. The Dunham family are cousins of the Tiffany family, prominent in the jewelry trade. In 1972, Dunham received a BA from Trinity College in Connecticut. In 1973, he moved to New York City, in a loft on 26th Street, and started working as an assistant to artist Dorothea Rockburne.

== Work ==
Between 1981 and 1987, Dunham worked directly on wood veneer, employing multiple types of plywood and various, ever more exotic veneers, including elm, oak, pine, and rosewood. Often responding to the natural grains of the wood, Dunham created vibrant compositions that frequently combine geometric and organic, anthropomorphic forms. In discussing this body of work, Ken Johnson writes, "What these paintings add up to is a kind of delirious, barely contained psychic pluralism. Various dualities and contradictions play out: between wood and pain; abstraction and representation; geometry and biology; the phallic and the vaginal; body and mind; nature and culture."

Towards the late 1980s, Dunham began to work with more singular motifs. Among the recurring figures in his work are wave-like forms, hatted male figures in a variety of settings, trees set in pastoral landscapes, and nude female bathers. Kate Linker writes,

These motifs have provided an armature for a continuous and seemingly self-generating practice in which paintings appear to evolve and differentiate from earlier versions of themselves. Imagery is generated through subject matter yet abstractly, in a series of variations that incrementally expand on and work through a theme.

Dunham has said of his use of various subjects in his practice, "… all these subjects are really just things that let you make paintings." Further to this point, Linker notes, "the figure is deployed as an iconic tool around which a space is built in accordance with the demands of the flat rectilinearity of the picture plane."

== Exhibitions and collections ==
Dunham currently has a large retrospective Carroll Dunham Drawings, 1974-2024 on display at the Art Institute of Chicago, Modern Wing thru June 1, 2026. Dunham has been the subject of numerous one-person exhibitions, including a mid-career retrospective at the New Museum in New York and an exhibition of paintings and sculptures at Millesgården in Stockholm. His work has been included in several Whitney Biennials and in "Disparaties and Deformations: Our Grotesque," SITE Santa Fe's fifth biennial curated by Robert Storr. He has participated in exhibitions at major institutions such as the Museum of Modern Art, New York; Musée d'Art Moderne de la Ville de Paris; and the Museo Nacional Centro de Arte Reina Sofía, Madrid.

His work is included in a number of public collections, including the Art Institute of Chicago, Chicago; Astrup Fearnley Museum of Modern Art, Oslo; Brooklyn Museum, New York; Museum Ludwig, Cologne; Museum of Modern Art, New York; Museum of Contemporary Art, Los Angeles; Philadelphia Museum of Art, Philadelphia; Tate Gallery, London; Walker Art Center, Minneapolis; and Whitney Museum of Art, New York.

== Personal life ==
Dunham lives and works in New York City and Cornwall, Connecticut with his wife, the artist Laurie Simmons. They have two children, actress-writer Lena Dunham and writer-activist Cyrus Dunham.

== Works and publications ==
- Carroll Dunham: Bathers Trees. New York: Gladstone Gallery, 2013 ISBN 978-3863353964
- Carroll Dunham: A Drawing Survey. Los Angeles: Blum & Poe, 2012 ISBN 978-0966350333
- Kemmerer, Allison N., Elizabeth C DeRose, and Carroll Dunham. Carroll Dunham Prints: Catalogue Raisonné, 1984–2006. New Haven: Yale University Press, 2008.
- Carroll Dunham: Painting and Sculpture 2004–2008. Zurich: JRP|Ringier, 2008 ISBN 978-3905829884
- Carroll Dunham: Paintings on Wood 1982–1987. New York: Skarstedt Gallery, 2008 ISBN 978-8890205934
- Friedrich, Julia. Carroll Dunham: Arbeiten auf Papier. Cologne: Strzelecki Books, 2008.
- Carroll Dunham: Dead, Yellow, Mule. Garbage, Ratio. Giant. New York: Gladstone Gallery, 2007.
- X#*@(ING) INDEX! Who is pointing at who – and why – in Carroll Dunham's Drawings. London: Koenig Books, 2006.
- Carroll Dunham: Line That Never Ends: Drawings 1984–2004. Zürich: Edition & Verlag Judin, 2005.
- Carroll Dunham: Paintings. New York: New Museum of Contemporary Art, 2002.
