= Kate Horsfield =

American video artist

- Born: 1944; Topeka, Kansas, United States
- Known for: Video art, video interviews with artists, author, educator

Kate Horsfield (born 1941), is an American artist who focused her work on video art and video documentation. She is also an author and teacher. She is best known for co-founding the Video Data Bank in 1976, an international video art distribution organization with Lyn Blumenthal.

== Life and career ==
Horsfield was born in Topeka, Kansas. In 1960 she moved to Chicago. She received her MFA from the School of the Art Institute of Chicago in 1976.

Horsfield and Blumenthal began a project that included the making of in-depth video interviews with visual and performance artists, critics, and photographers. The first interview was with art historian and curator Marcia Tucker at Artemisia Gallery in Chicago in 1974. Together they also produced more than 90 interviews with artists such as Agnes Martin, Alice Neel, Lee Krasner, Romare Bearden, Joseph Beuys, Vito Acconci and Buckminster Fuller. The video interviews were made between 1974 and 1988.

As an educator Horsfield periodically taught courses between the years of 1977 to 2007 at the School of the Art Institute of Chicago, the University of Illinois at Chicago, and the University of Texas at Austin. After the death of Lyn Blumenthal in 1988, Horsfield was executive director of the Video Data Bank until September 2006. She currently lives and works in New York City.

== Selected works ==
As co-producer with Lyn Blumenthal

- Marcia Tucker: An Interview (1974)
- Alice Neel: An Interview (1975)
- Jennifer Bartlett: An Interview (1976)
- Meredith Monk: An Interview (1977)
- Chuck Close: An Interview (1980)
- Joseph Beuys: An Interview (1980)
- Yvonne Jacquette: An Interview (1981)
- Vito Acconci: An Interview (1983)
- Craig Owens: An Interview (1984)
- Phyllis Bramson: An Interview (1984)

As producer

- Surveying the First Decade: Video Art and Alternative Media in the U.S. (1968–1980)
- Ana Mendieta : fuego de tierra (1987)
- Video Against AIDS (1989)
- The Video Drive In (1991)
