= Laurie Simmons =

American artist, photographer and filmmaker

- Born: October 3, 1949 (age 77); Far Rockaway, Queens, New York, U.S.
- Education: Tyler School of Art
- Known for: Photography, film, sculpture
- Spouse: Carroll Dunham
- Children: Lena Dunham (daughter); Cyrus Dunham (son)
- Awards: Guggenheim Fellowship, American Academy in Rome, National Endowment for the Arts
- Website: LaurieSimmons.net

Laurie Simmons, First Bathroom/ Woman Kneeling, 1978.

Laurie Simmons (born October 3, 1949) is an American photographer and filmmaker. Art historians consider her a key figure of The Pictures Generation and a group of late-1970s women artists that emerged as a counterpoint to the male-dominated and formalist fields of painting and sculpture. The group introduced new approaches to photography, such as staged setups, narrative, and appropriations of pop culture and everyday objects that pushed the medium toward the center of contemporary art. Simmons's elaborately constructed images employ psychologically charged human proxies—dolls, ventriloquist dummies, mannequins, props, miniatures and interiors—and also depict people as dolls. Often noted for its humor and pathos, her art explores boundaries such as between artifice and truth or private and public, while raising questions about the construction of identity, tropes of prosperity, consumerism and domesticity, and practices of self-presentation and image-making. In a review of Simmons's 2019 retrospective at the Museum of Contemporary Art, Chicago, critic Steve Johnson wrote, "Collectively—and with a sly but barbed sense of humor—[her works] challenge you to think about what, if anything, is real: in our gender roles, and our cultural assumptions, and our perceptions of others."

Simmons's art belongs to the public collections of the Metropolitan Museum of Art, Museum of Modern Art (MoMA), Los Angeles County Museum of Art, Solomon R. Guggenheim Museum, Hara Museum (Tokyo) and Stedelijk Museum Amsterdam, among others. She has exhibited at venues including MoMA, the Museum of Contemporary Art, Los Angeles, Walker Art Center and Whitney Museum. In 1997, she received a Guggenheim Fellowship. She lives and works in New York City and Cornwall, Connecticut.

== Early life and career ==
Simmons was born in 1949 in Far Rockaway, Queens, New York, the daughter of Jewish parents, Dorothy "Dot" Simmons, a homemaker, and Samuel "Sam" Simmons, a dentist. She spent her formative years in Great Neck, Long Island and began photographing at the age of six, with a Kodak Brownie camera her father gave her. She studied printmaking, painting and sculpture at the Tyler School of Art and Architecture, earning a BFA in 1971.

After graduating, Simmons traveled in Europe and lived in a commune-like situation in upstate New York; while there she purchased a cache of toys and dollhouse furniture from a failing toy store and began experimenting with photography. In 1973, she moved to SoHo, sharing a loft with the late photographer Jimmy DeSana, who helped her set up a darkroom; Simmons is executor of the Jimmy DeSana Estate/Trust. She started working with life-like set-ups using old dollhouses, dolls and the toys she purchased—a unique approach then, which reflected her encounter with a contemporary art scene open to new forms. Her first solo exhibitions took place at Artists Space (1979), MoMA PS1 (1979) and Metro Pictures (1981, initiating a 20-year relationship) in New York and at the Walker Art Center (1987), among other venues.

In subsequent years, she exhibited at Sperone Westwater and Salon 94 in New York, Amanda Wilkinson Gallery in London, the Contemporary Art Museum St. Louis and Jewish Museum (Manhattan). Retrospectives of her work have been held at the San Jose Museum of Art (1990), Baltimore Museum of Art (1997), Gothenburg Museum of Art (2012), Neues Museum Nürnberg (2014), Modern Art Museum of Fort Worth (2018) and Museum of Contemporary Art, Chicago (2019). She also exhibited in the Whitney Biennial (1985, 1991), Bienal de São Paulo (1985), Biennale of Sydney (1986) and Austrian Triennial on Photography (1996), and surveys at MOCA LA, MoMA and the Metropolitan Museum of Art, among others.

== Work and reception ==
In her career spanning more than four decades, Simmons has used the camera to explore psycho-social subtexts involving gender, social convention, identity and cultural aspiration, often by considering ways that objects are humanized and people—particularly women—are objectified. Central to her work are visual contrivances such as manipulation of scale and photography's capacity to deceive, inanimate human surrogates, which mediate subjects, creating a sense of remove and disjuncture often described as uncanny and unsettling. Simmons's striking uses of color, pattern and lighting are often cited as important factors in her work's articulation of cultural memory, emotion and interiority. Critics also identify a performative aspect to her photographs akin to cinema, in which elements like set-building, role-playing or body-painting are as central as the act of photographing itself.

According to New York Times critic Ken Johnson, "Simmons is counted as a core member of the Pictures Generation, whose appropriations, manipulations and simulations of various photographic genres profoundly altered the course of late-20th-century art." The group emerged in the aftermath of conceptual art and the sociopolitical upheavals of the 1970s, offering a critical, often playful examination of an increasingly media-saturated world. Their work—and for the women, their prominence in the field—represented a radical departure from the art norms of the time. Critics particularly connect Simmons's work with that of New York contemporaries Cindy Sherman and Sarah Charlesworth, whose photography also made use of personal and collective memory, pop culture and everyday objects in order to restage, rework or subvert socio-cultural constructions.

Although traditional gender roles are a common theme in Simmons's pieces and her work is often discussed in the context of feminist critique, critics note in it an ambivalence and nostalgia that is more sociological than political. Simmons presents the lived experiences and collective cultural memory of women in a way that preserves complexity and agency. From an art historical perspective, her images conflating dolls and humans are seen as upending of surrealist photography that used replicas of women as objects of male desire (e.g., Man Ray, Hans Bellmer).

=== Doll and dollhouse works (1976–98) ===
In earlier work, Simmons staged tableaux with dolls, toys and props, using visual immersion into miniature spaces to create moments of dramatic potency. Her small dollhouse images often presented a solitary miniature plastic housewife in mundane domestic scenarios—organizing food, preparing a bath or watching television in pristine spaces—that offered a simultaneously nostalgic and critical view of idealized, 1950s American femininity and suburban conformity (e.g., First Bathroom/Woman Kneeling, 1978). Ken Johnson described her initial black-and-white series (1976–78) as "funny, strange and moody," adding, "Big themes animate these small pictures: feminism, consumerism and the sociology of photography … Yet the intellectual dimension is handled with such unassuming, playful intimacy that you could almost miss its role in making these seminal explorations of set-up photography so richly evocative."

Laurie Simmons, Walking House, color photograph, 1989.

With the "Early Color Interiors" series (1978–79), Simmons shifted to saturated Cibachrome images, introducing elements of longing and fantasy associated with advertising, fashion, and film into the work. Assessing them later, New York Times critic Michael Kimmelman wrote, "the mood is wry, ad hoc and bittersweet, the feminist message neither obscure nor didactic … Her gifts for light, pattern and color and for making catchy images disproportionate to their modest size are nowhere more apparent than in these photographs." In the larger-format "Color-Coordinated Interiors" (1982–83) and "Tourism" (1983–84) images, Simmons set monochrome Japanese dolls against rear-projected, like-hued rooms or postcard slides of famed tourist sites that seemed to subsume them; the latter works questioned the artificially contrived "slickness" of such images and the possibility of unprogrammed, unmediated experience.

Inspired by old dancing cigarette box commercials and Rockettes-like chorus lines, Simmons's tongue-in-cheek, human-scaled "Walking and Lying Objects" (1987–91) featured human-object hybrids. She created them by outfitting dolls with miniature, highly symbolic props—handbags, houses, perfume bottles, guns, pastries—that covered all but their slender legs (e.g., Walking House, 1989). Suggesting possessions that took on agency and women merging into cultural stereotypes, the images nodded toward consumer culture and the objectification of the female body in ways that ARTnews writer Elizabeth Hayt-Atkins noted for their "weirdness, wittiness, and glamour."

Simmons explored masculine and portraiture conventions, using ventriloquist dummies and toy or model train figurine setups ("Cowboys," 1979 and "Actual Photos", 1985, with Allan McCollum). Her "Clothes Make the Man" series (1990–92) featured seven near-identical dummies differentiated mainly by clothing, calling to mind post-World War II conformity and the minute differences in appearance thought to distinguish people. The "Café of the Inner Mind" series (1994) presented the dummies in environments with digitally collaged thought bubbles revealing fantasies about sex, food or doting mothers.

In 1994, Simmons extended the blurring of object and person in her work by commissioning a female dummy in her own likeness. She photographed it with six male dummies in simulated self-portraits ("The Music of Regret" series, 1994) that hinted at a crisis of self-fashioning in the face of a culture of artificiality and pretense; the images were a springboard for her first film.

=== Later artwork projects (2001–present) ===
In her post-2000 projects, Simmons moved toward human subjects and greater emotional starkness, extending recurrent themes of dolls, artifice, public and private to include social media practices of constructing, disseminating and obscuring images of the self.

In "The Instant Decorator" series (2001–04), Simmons collaged fabric swatches, drawings and figures clipped from fashion magazines and sex comics onto room templates from a 1976 interior decorating book, then enlarged them into seamless, if disjointed, wholes. Combining an ambiguous mix of scale and styles—intense colors, discordant fabrics, askew paintings and kitschy accessories—the images depicted dramatic scenarios (cooking, sex, slumber parties) that ARTnews critic Hilarie Sheets called "glossy, over-the-top retro fantasies of domestic desirability." The "Long House" (2003–04) and "Color Pictures/Deep Photos" (2007–22) works addressed sexuality, with sultry, confident women appropriated from porn magazines and sites set in a worn, three-dimensional doll house that evoked a low-rent bordello and desecrated, film noir version of Simmons's early doll house images.

Laurie Simmons, How We See/Tatiana (Pink), Pigment print, 70" x 48", 2015.

"The Love Doll" series (2009–11) represented a turn from the retro or nostalgic, toward the contemporary, realistic and human-scaled. The large, color-saturated images portrayed thirty days in the "life" of a high-end, life-size sex doll from Japan. Set in a real domestic world (Simmons's home) that had a normalizing effect underplaying the sexual element, the series privileged the doll's emotional life as a kind of "Everygirl" engaged in casual moments of undisturbed innocence. Artforum's Jeffrey Kastner wrote that Simmons "conjured remarkable depth of feeling and unexpected poignancy from an object that is, by definition, a caricature."

Simmons made the transition to human models in two photographic series influenced by kigurumi, a Japanese costume play subculture in which participants become doll-like characters through masks, bodysuits, make-up or surgery. "Dollers" (2014) featured women wearing large doll heads, drawing unexpected feelings and expressiveness out of carefully crafted compositions and poses. The oversize "How We See" portraits (2015) depicted young women in yearbook-like poses against bright curtains, with radiant light catching strangely vacant eyes that were actually trompe l'oeil illusions painted onto their closed eyelids (e.g., How We See/Tatiana (Pink), 2015). Reviewers described them as "equal parts alien and alluring … uncanny in their mystery" and "flicker[ing] between warm-blooded and animatronic." As with the doll masks, the process removed the models' sight leaving them vulnerable—an effect critics interpreted variously as commentary on the objectification of women, the opacity and risk of online identities, or the unreliability of assumptions about perception, self-presentation and portraiture.

In the "Some New" photographs (2018), Simmons moved further toward direct portraiture, while still marshalling visible contrivances. They depicted friends and family in states of change, renewal or guise, adorned in only body-paint that realistically simulated clothing yet left them somewhat exposed. The images included portraits of her children, Lena Dunham and Cyrus Dunham, as Audrey Hepburn and Rudolph Valentino, respectively. In 2022, Simmons began experimenting with A.I. (text-to-image generators), yielding the "Autofiction" images and a movie; the images consist of surreal scenes of women in interiors that recall her early staging of dolls and extend her considerations of the ways images can deceive.

=== Filmmaking and acting ===
Simmons's first major film was The Music of Regret (2006, MoMA; Art21), a 45-minute, three-act musical weaving iconic elements of her photographic work, actors and puppets into humorous and poignant vignettes about choices made in friendship, love and work. The acts include a dark-wigged Meryl Streep portraying a speed dater (and Simmons surrogate) being courted by male ventriloquist dummies and the Alvin Ailey dancers embodying her "Walking Objects" female archetypes in a heartbreaking, Chorus Line-like audition. Geisha Song (2010) was a looping short film exhibited with "The Love Doll" series; it consisted of dream-like views of a doll made up as a geisha, set to a Japanese vocalist singing the Dietrich classic "Falling in Love Again" in nasal, accented English.

In the feature-length film she wrote and directed, My Art (2016), Simmons took on stereotypes about the lives of older women artists and their career aspirations. The New Yorker critic Richard Brody deemed it "a frankly practical look at professionalism and its blurry borders." Simmons portrayed the protagonist, Ellie, a single, 60-something artist, who spends a month in a borrowed country house (Simmons's) to regenerate herself and her stalled art career. While different in character, Ellie's art—meticulous, DIY feminist recreations of Hollywood scenes in which she subs for Marilyn Monroe, Marlene Dietrich and others—shares concerns with Simmons's work involving artifice, fantasy, reality and women's roles. Eve MacSweeney of Vogue called the film "a devastatingly funny and subtle lens on such subjects as success, ageism, loneliness, absurdity, dating in your 60s, inhibition and disinhibition, collaboration, and ruthlessness." Its cast included actors Blair Brown and Parker Posey and Simmons's friend Marilyn Minter.

Simmons also co-starred in her daughter Lena Dunham's award-winning independent film, Tiny Furniture (2010), as a mother and mid-career artist whose daughter returns home after university; shot in the Dunhams' New York apartment, it included fake "movie art" that Simmons created. She appeared in a 2011 Gossip Girl television episode as a portrait artist whose style resembled her "Interior Decorator" works.

=== Collaborative fashion and design projects ===
In 2008, Simmons collaborated with the designer Thakoon Panichgul on fabrics for his 2009 spring collection based on her "Walking & Lying Objects" series. The final pattern repeated an image of a blood-red rose over legs in repose. In 2010, she created works using paper dolls created from images of models dressed in designer Peter Jensen's clothing, which she placed inside her signature dollhouse tableaus, then collaged and photographed. She collaborated with cosmetics entrepreneur Poppy King on a limited-edition poppy red lipstick, "Pushing It," that was available in tandem with her museum retrospectives in 2018 and 2019.

Simmons created the Kaleidoscope House (2000–2) with architect Peter Wheelwright, an interactive, three-story modernist dollhouse sold in stores, which she later photographed. It employed colorful sliding transparent walls and miniature artwork and furniture by contemporary artists and designers.

== Personal life ==
Simmons lives and works in New York City and Cornwall, Connecticut with her husband, painter Carroll Dunham. They have two children: writer, director and actress Lena Dunham and Cyrus Dunham, author of the memoir A Year Without A Name, actor and activist.

== Collections and recognition ==
Simmons's work is held in the collections of the Albright-Knox Art Gallery, Art Institute of Chicago, Baltimore Museum of Art, Brooklyn Museum, Hara Museum, High Museum of Art, International Center of Photography, Jewish Museum, Los Angeles County Museum of Art, Metropolitan Museum of Art, Moderna Museet (Stockholm), Musée d'art contemporain de Montréal, Museo Nacional Centro de Arte Reina Sofía (Madrid), MOCA LA, Museum of Contemporary Art Chicago, Museum of Fine Arts, Houston, Museum of Modern Art, National Gallery of Art, Philadelphia Museum of Art, Saint Louis Art Museum, San Francisco Museum of Modern Art, Solomon R. Guggenheim Museum, Stedelijk Museum, Tate, Walker Art Center, Weatherspoon Art Museum and Whitney Museum, among others.

She has been recognized with a Women in the Arts Award from the Brooklyn Museum (2013), the International Artist Award (with Carroll Dunham) from Anderson Ranch Arts Center (2011), an American Academy in Rome residency (2005), a John S. Guggenheim Fellowship (1997) and a National Endowment for the Arts grant (1984). In 2016, the International Center of Photography named her its sixth "Spotlights" honoree for her contributions to visual culture.

== Publications ==
- Simmons, Laurie (1983). In and Around the House: Photographs, 1976-1979. Buffalo, NY: CEPA. ISBN 978-0-939-78406-6. OCLC 10276353.
- 鈴木行; Simmons, Laurie; Sherman, Cindy (interview by); Suzuki, Gyoh (1987). AM Corporation (ed.). Laurie Simmons = LS, Laurie Simmons = Rōrī Shimonzu shashinshū (in Japanese and English). Tokyo: Parco. ISBN 978-4-891-94155-0. OCLC 19034862.
- Simmons, Laurie (1987). Laurie Simmons: Water Ballet/Family Collision. Minneapolis, MN: Walker Art Center. ISBN 978-0-935-64023-6. OCLC 16756308.
- Simmons, Laurie; Cameron, Dan (1990). Laurie Simmons, San Jose Museum of Art (Exhibition catalog). San Jose, CA: San Jose Museum of Art. ISBN 978-0-938-17510-0. OCLC 922655066. Catalog of an exhibition held at the San Jose Museum of Art, California, October 21-December 30, 1990.
- Simmons, Laurie; Charlesworth, Sarah (interviewed by) (1994). Bartman, William S.; Sappington, Rodney (eds.). Laurie Simmons. Encino, CA: A.R.T. Press. ISBN 978-0-923-18313-4. OCLC 924758133.
- Howard, Jan; Simmons, Laurie (1997). Laurie Simmons: The Music of Regret (Exhibition catalog). Baltimore: Baltimore Museum of Art. ISBN 978-0-912-29869-6. OCLC 37424930. Published in conjunction with the exhibition held May 28-August 10, 1997 at the Baltimore Museum of Art
- Simmons, Laurie; Schorr, Collier (text by) (2002). Laurie Simmons: Photographs 1978/79 (Exhibition catalog). New York, NY: Skarstedt. ISBN 978-0-970-90903-9. OCLC 50475850. Published on the occasion of the exhibition of the same name, May 4-June 29, 2002
- Simmons, Laurie; Squiers, Carol (texts by) (2003). Laurie Simmons: In and Around the House, Photographs, 1976-78. New York: Carolina Nitsch Editions. ISBN 978-0-974-06660-8. OCLC 53190565.
- Linker, Kate (2005). Laurie Simmons: Walking, Talking, Lying (1st ed.). New York: Aperture. ISBN 978-1-931-78859-5. OCLC 964632609.
- Simmons, Laurie (2007). Laurie Simmons: Color Coordinated Interiors 1983 (Exhibition catalog). New York: Skarstedt Fine Art. ISBN 978-0-970-90906-0. OCLC 154788379. Catalog of an exhibition held at Skarstedt Fine Art, New York (September 19 - October 27, 2007) and Sperone Westwater, New York (27 April - 30 June 2006)
- Simmons, Laurie; Greenberg Rohatyn, Jean (introductory essay by) (2012). Tillman, Lynne (ed.). The Love Doll (Exhibition catalog). New York / Tokyo: Salon 94 / Tomio Koyama. ISBN 978-0-615-59689-1. OCLC 829059684. Published in conjunction with the exhibition "The Love Doll: Days 1-30," in New York, at Salon 94, Feb. 15-Mar. 26, 2011 and in London, at Wilkinson Gallery, June 9-July 10, 2011; "The Love Doll (Geisha): Days 31-36," in Aspen, Colorado, at Baldwin Gallery, Mar. 16-Apr. 15, 2012; and "The Love Doll," in Tokyo, at Tomio Koyama Gallery, in 2013
- Simmons, Laurie; Nilsson, Isabella; Thorkildsen, Åsmund (2012). Sjöström, Johan (ed.). Laurie Simmons: Red, Yellow and Blue (Exhibition catalog) (in Swedish and English). Gothenburg: The Gothenburg Museum of Art. ISBN 978-91-87968-78-5.
