= Julia Couzens =

American artist

- Born: 1947 (age 78–79); Auburn, California, US
- Education: University of California, Davis, California State University, Sacramento, California College of Arts and Crafts, California State University, Chico
- Known for: Drawing, sculpture, installation, writing
- Awards: Louis Comfort Tiffany Fellowship, Art Matters, Roswell Artist-in-Residence Program
- Website: www.juliacouzens.com

Julia Couzens (born 1947) is a California-based artist and writer known for drawing, sculpture and installation art that embraces unconventional materials and methods. Critic David Roth identifies as a connecting thread in her evolving work, her "decidedly surrealist-symbolist sensibility, in which eroticism, the grotesque and the gothic mix in equal parts." Her work has been shown in solo exhibitions at the Christopher Grimes Gallery and California State University, Stanislaus (2009), surveys at the University of California, Davis and Sonoma Museum of Visual Art (1999), and group shows at the Crocker Art Museum, P•P•O•W (New York), Orange County Museum of Art, Hammer Museum, and BAMPFA, among others. Her art has been reviewed in the Los Angeles Times, San Francisco Chronicle, Flash Art, New Art Examiner, and Art Practical, among other publications, and collected by the Crocker Art Museum, Fine Arts Museums of San Francisco, Oakland Museum of California and Butler Institute of American Art, among many.

In addition to working as an artist, Couzens has taught at several Southern California universities and writes about contemporary art for The Sacramento Bee and Squarecylinder. She lives and works on Merritt Island in the Sacramento River delta community of Clarksburg and maintains a studio in downtown Los Angeles.

Julia Couzens, Chanteuse, Mixed textiles, pins, thread, 12" x 14.5" x 4", 2016

== Early life and career ==
Couzens was born and raised in Auburn, California. Her mother, Jean Little Couzens, was founding editor of West Art, the coast's first contemporary art newspaper, circa 1960. After studying English and philosophy at California State University, Chico (BA, 1970), Couzens moved to Oakland, where she worked at a law school, explored San Francisco's bohemian scene, and took classes at California College of Arts and Crafts; an early work was part of the Crocker-Kingsley competition at the Crocker Art Museum in 1972.

After moving to Sacramento in 1977, Couzens studied art at City College, California State University, Sacramento (MA, 1987) and University of California (UC), Davis (MFA, 1990), where she worked with Robert Arneson, Squeak Carnwath, Manuel Neri, Cornelia Schulz, and Wayne Thiebaud. Her studies were interrupted by an accident in 1989 that forced a long recovery in a wheelchair and crutches and shifted her art from large abstractions using unconventional materials to small charcoal drawings she could do in her lap. They led to her first mature work, atmospheric charcoal drawings that fused abstraction and figuration. During and after graduate studies, Couzens drew attention for her art in shows at the Christopher Grimes (Santa Monica), Jeremy Stone (San Francisco) and Michael Himovitz (Sacramento) galleries; the Oakland Museum and Yale University also acquired works. She began teaching at this time, at Scripps College, and later at UC (Santa Cruz and Davis) and California State University, Sacramento between 1990–2003; she was a visiting artist at the University of Nevada, Las Vegas and San Francisco Art Institute.

== Work ==
Julia Couzens, Respirandi Spatium, charcoal on paper, 43" x 55", 1992

Critics and curators note that Couzens's practice is fluid and wide-ranging, encompassing several identifiable bodies and mediums and a multitude of materials, rather than any one signature style. Common to them is an intuitive, sometimes "obsessive, hyperactive working process" that resists intellectualization in its investigations of bodily form and being, nature, and matter. Writers have recognized Surrealist Georges Bataille and Symbolist Odilon Redon as influences in her earlier, body-derived work; her later fabric, fiber and network bodies of work have been likened to the constructions of Eva Hesse and Louise Bourgeois, and to the found-material installations of Annette Messager and Judy Pfaff.

=== Body-derived works (1989–1999) ===
Couzens's body-derived work ranges from monumental figurative-based charcoal drawings to abstract watercolors that evoke internal cellular realities to sculptural objects resembling external body parts. Writer Debra Wilbur suggested that this work created mystery through its oscillation between the micro- and macroscopic, while curator Bruce Guenther located its fascination in its hovering between being "seductive and grotesque, abstract and referential."

Julia Couzens, Untitled, watercolor on paper, 30" x 20", 2003

==== "Mortal Lessons" (1990–2003) ====
Couzens has long been recognized for her draftsmanship, and writers (herself included) consider it to be at the core of her practice, even in later sculptural work. She first gained attention in the late 1980s for large charcoal drawings of headless, armless, torso-like forms floating in amorphous space (e.g., Respirandi Spatium, 1993), that were noted for their Seurat-like shadings of dark and light and mystical, funereal quality. Contrasting the lushly drawn forms and their surfaces pocked with scars, slashes and fissures, writers such as Jody Zellen observed that the work exposed human vulnerability to emotional and physical "tears," yet indulged erotic paradoxes of beauty and terror, attraction and repulsion. Couzens also painted color-saturated, vaporous watercolors alluding to eyes, breasts and microscopic, coalescing or replicating corpuscles, membranes and cells (e.g., Untitled, 2003). Susan Kandel noted the work's ability to evoke psychological states—claustrophobia, joy, loneliness, liberation—despite its abstraction; David Roth foregrounded its "spiritual search for the microscopic origins of life." In the mid-1990s, Couzens created randomly configured, gallery-wide drawing installations, such as Ab Intra Galore (1994), composed of large sheets of tumbling black orbs whose minimal, abstract patterns alluded to cells, DNA, and mitosis.

Julia Couzens, Physical Culture No. 1, mixed plastics, pigment on panel, 12" x 11" x 4.5", 1997

==== "Globules" (1995–1999) ====
While participating in the Roswell Artist-in-Residency program, Couzens noted a kinship between locally popular, decorative plastic grapes and her drawing forms. Looking to shift away from her drawing work, she began transforming the grapes into humorous, vaguely perverse, paint and liquid resin-coated entities that evoked cells, eggs and eyes, using the modeling compound, Sculpey. These experiments became the "Globules" series—surreal abstract sculptures situated between the animate and inanimate, which seemingly grew from gallery walls. Critics described them as "fascinating as well as grotesque, monstrous as well as beautiful," and "indecent, ill-mannered and lewd" representations of the "latent potential for the body to run amok." Between 1994 and 1995, she created Lingua Franca (loosely translated, "common tongue"), an 11-by-14-foot (3.4 by 4.3 m) wall array of 3,200 individually formed tongues, first installed at the Crocker Art Museum. Art Week wrote that the "pink, fleshy, palpitating field" suggested myriad references—linguistic, sensory, salacious and lewd—while operating at a purely visual level from a distance. Related works included Witness Syndrome (1995), a 13' column of watery eye- or undersea-like organisms that emerged from a corner, and the "Congeries" series—"heaps" of gelatinous-like material that included doll parts, such as Physical Culture No. 1 (1997). Debra Wilbur described this work as upending "the usual representational banality of body parts" to depict its "mutated, disarticulated, and sometimes morbid aspects."

=== Fabric, fiber and net works (2003–present) ===
In 2001, a chance viewing of an Art Institute of Chicago exhibition of European lace inspired a new breakthrough in Couzens's art at a time when she sought to pursue work "less predictably artful and complete" than in the past. The intricate whorls and linear patterns of the lace suggested webs, nests, veins and fingerprints, leading her work to attend more to natural forces beyond the body and cultural issues involving domesticity and power. Three major bodies of work emerged: the web-like, three-dimensional "Net Work" fabrications; the "Tape" drawings, in which she "drew" using scissors, a matte knife and cut tape on vellum; and the "Bundles," which were sculptural forms tightly wrapped with twine, rope, yarn and fabric. Critics noted the linear energy of this work, comparing it to the frenzied thickets of gesture in the late paintings of Willem de Kooning; Couzens has described the three–dimensional works as "drawings in space."

Julia Couzens, La Little Thing, twist-ties, pipe cleaners, wire, threads, beret 7' 10', 2003

==== "Net Works" (2003–2009) ====
Couzens's "Net Works" were uncanny, sometimes slapstick, dangling webs and woven nets that she fabricated from eclectic, mundane materials, such as twist-ties, pipe cleaners, shoelaces, neckties and wire, and suspended as sculpture or draped as wall hangings and scrims. Their assortment of visual reference points—spider webs, seaweed, dense underbrush, crochet, networks—signaled a departure from distinct objects to more ambiguous, shifting matrices of nature and culture unraveling, ensnaring or conjoining that emphasized fragility, ephemerality and tenuousness. Her show "Net Work" (2003) featured wall pieces whose allusions ranged from eroticism (La Little One) to the figure (Ultra Light) to landscape (Fancy). In "Strange Fascination" (2006), she expanded the work spatially and materially, transforming steel cages, yarn, electrical tape, lighting fixtures, fabric, and more, into obsessive pieces that referenced domesticity and femininity. David Roth described the show as a parasitically spreading, "sprawling, near-gothic accretion of accumulated 'junk,' […] both installation and performance" and as "a Technicolor jumble cum jungle."

Throughout the 2000s, Couzens has complemented her sculptural work with the "Tape Drawings"—largely abstract patterns of linear energy that she creates through a labor-intensive process of layering cut strips and filing-like dashes of black and blue tape on vellum, with occasional touches of paint. Critics observe that the drawings offer a cooler, more deliberate, synthetic investigation of line, network, node and space compared to the more romantic and natural nets. They have been described as a "visual haiku," referencing fingerprints, trees, constellations or fireworks.

==== "Bundles" (2009–present) ====
Couzens's "Bundles" consist of intuitive, abstract sculptural forms evoking god's eyes, dreamcatchers or cat's cradles, that she builds up through processes of wrapping, binding, stitching and layering, and displays as wall pieces or floating "satellites," such as Chanteuse (2016, top). Critics note the work's dedication to repetition, process and linear rhythm, its thickets of fiber, twine, thread, wire and fabric in clashing commercial color defining form, texture and space; they have been deemed "visual piñatas" and likened to the disparate work of artists El Anatsui, Claes Oldenberg, and Judith Scott. Christopher Miles noted Couzens's conversion of line into form as a tool capable of expressing humor, idiosyncrasy, or vulnerability. He wrote that in their cobbled-together, imprecise method—part bricoleur, part gestural expressionist—they call to mind "a sense of scavenged subsistence […] frailty and vulnerability," yet also communicate "a vibrance, and a stirring pathos."

In 2017, Couzens exhibited Last Words, a 2,500-square-foot (230 m^{2}) mixed-media installation at Sacramento State University. It combined elements of previous work—networks, scrims, commonplace objects, and stitched and wrapped elements that form text—to pay tribute in loosely connected "stations" to people's droll, inconsequential, and sometimes heartbreaking last words, which she solicited and culled from history.

==== "Textile Tags" (2017–2021) ====
Couzens's exhibition "Stitch ‘n Bitch" (2021, Patricia Sweetow) presented 103 collage works collectively titled "Textile Tags": appropriated art-periodical advertisements of famous male artists that she amended—or "tagged," like a street artist—with sewn-on fabric scraps that subtly invade and sometimes completely efface the original images. Squarecylinder critic Mark Van Proyen noted the series' unexpected variation, use of double entendre (garment tag and graffiti tagging), and irreverent, often biting feminist critique of art-world sexism and market hype.

== Collections and awards ==
Couzens's work is in many public and private collections, including those of the Crocker Art Museum, Fine Arts Museums of San Francisco, Berkeley Art Museum and Pacific Film Archive, Weatherspoon Art Museum, Oakland Museum of California, Butler Institute of American Art, New Britain Museum of American Art, Anderson Museum of Contemporary Art, Yale University Art Gallery, and Frederick R. Weisman Art Foundation, among others. She has been recognized with a Publication Fellowship from Peripheral Vision Press (2018), visual artist fellowships from the Louis Comfort Tiffany Foundation and Art Matters (both 1995), and an artist-in residency at the Roswell Museum and Art Center (1994). In 2019, Couzens participated in the Cheongju Contemporary Craft Biennale in South Korea.
