= Cyrus Grace Dunham =

American writer and activist (born 1992)

Cyrus Dunham
- Born: January 28, 1992 (age 34); New York City, U.S.
- Education: Brown University
- Occupations: Writer; actor
- Years active: 2014–present
- Parents: Carroll Dunham; Laurie Simmons
- Relatives: Lena Dunham (sister)

Cyrus Dunham (/ˈdʌnəm/ DUN-əm; born Grace Dunham on January 28, 1992) is an American writer and actor whose debut book, A Year Without A Name: A Memoir, was a Lambda Literary Award finalist. Dunham identifies as transmasculine nonbinary and prefers the pronouns they/them in professional contexts.

== Early life ==
Dunham was born and raised in New York City. Their parents are artist and photographer Laurie Simmons and painter Carroll Dunham. Dunham's older sister, Lena, is a writer, actress, and producer.

They attended St. Ann's School in New York City, and wrote for the school newspaper and yearbook and spoke at the graduation. As a high school student in 2009, Dunham received the Poetry Society of America's Louise Louis/Emily F. Bourne Student Poetry Award for the poem "Twin Oaks", which was judged for the competition by American poet Matthew Rohrer.

They graduated from Brown University with a degree in urban studies in May 2014, and was a contributing writer for the student weekly The College Hill Independent.

== Career ==
=== Writing and activism ===
Dunham has written for The New Yorker, Artforum and Granta; as well as Transgender Herstory in 99 Objects: Legends and Mythologies at the ONE National Gay & Lesbian Archives, UNCOUNTED: Call & Response at Vienna Secession and the AL-UGH-ORIES monograph, as part of Nicole Eisenman's exhibition at the New Museum.

In 2016, Dunham's first collection of poetry and short essays, The Fool, was published. The publication is a free, online-only web-book published by Curse of Cherifa.

Dunham's memoir, A Year Without a Name, was published in October 2019 by Little, Brown and Company. The book was met with positive reviews from The Atlantic, Kirkus Reviews and them. A short section of the book was published online in The New Yorker.

Dunham has collaborated frequently with transgender activist Tourmaline; their work together includes public speaking, writing, and performance. In 2020, Dunham co-founded Deluge Books, a queer literary press, with Hannah Baer and Emily Segal.

=== Film ===
Dunham's first film appearance was in the 2006 short, Dealing, as June, a 13-year-old art dealer. Dealing was written and directed by Dunham's older sister.

In 2010, Dunham starred in a second film written and directed by their sister, called Tiny Furniture, in which Dunham's sister and mother played characters that were loosely based on their own family.

Dunham stars as Junior in the film Happy Birthday, Marsha! about the gay activist Marsha P. Johnson and transgender activist Sylvia Rivera in the hours before the Stonewall riots. Dunham also appeared in artist A.K. Burns' multi-channel video installation A Smeary Spot.

== See also ==
- LGBTQ culture in New York City
- List of LGBTQ people from New York City
- Literature analysis
- NYC Pride March
