= Hilja Keading =

American artist (born 1960)

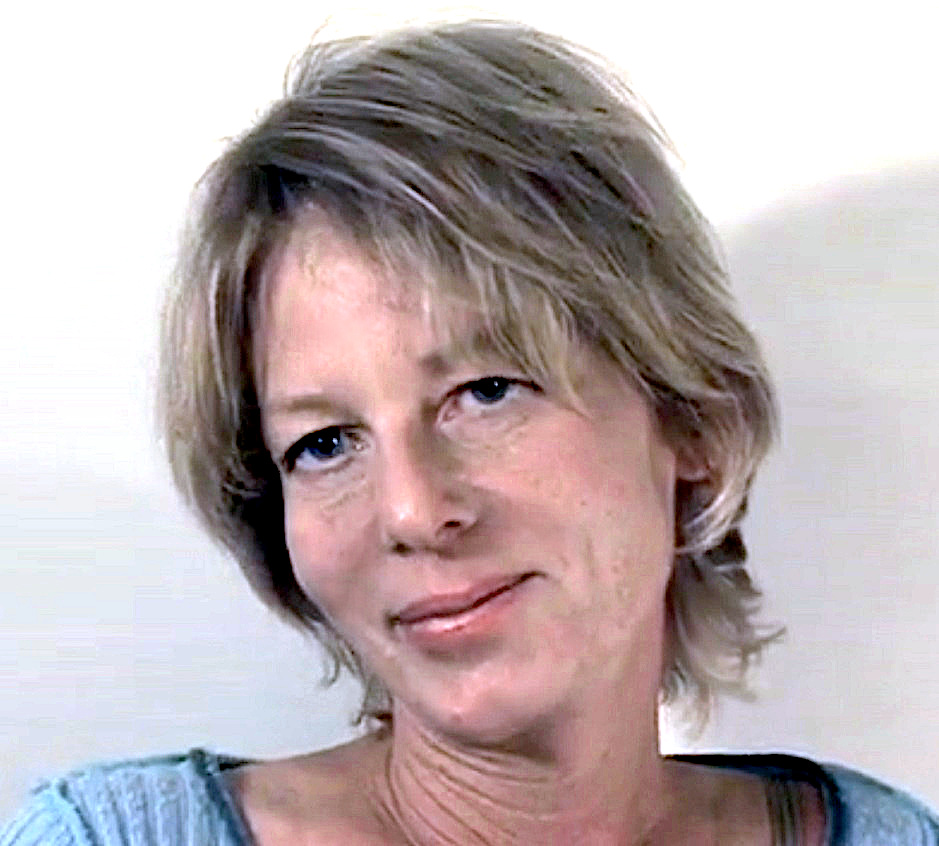
- Keading in Speaking Portraits c.2003
- Born: May 16, 1960 (age 66); Berkeley, California, U.S.
- Education: University of California, Los Angeles (BFA, MFA)
- Occupations: Visual artist, educator
- Known for: Video art, installation art
- Website: hiljakeading.com

Hilja Keading (born 1960) is an American visual artist and educator. She primarily works in the field of video art. She teaches at the University of California, Riverside.

== Education ==
Hilja Keading was born on May 16, 1960, in Berkeley, California.

Keading received a B.F.A. degree in 1982 and an M.F.A. degree in 1986 in sculpture and new genres from the University of California, Los Angeles.

== Career ==
Keading primarily creates multi-channel video installations. For example, her four-channel video installation The Bonkers Devotional (2007) depicts the artist spending time with a live black bear named Bonkers inside a small room. Exhibited in numerous venues including "Intelligent Design: Interspecies Art" at the Sweeny Gallery, U.C. Riverside (Riverside 2009), Angles Gallery (Los Angeles 2010), and the Bass Museum (Miami Beach 2012), The Bonkers Devotional has received extensive critical acclaim. Los Angeles Times art critic David Pagel describes Keading's work as "a powerful piece". Micol Hebron wrote in Art Forum that "as Keading and the bear tolerate and negotiate each other's presence without resolution or capitulation, we are reminded of the profound complexities of the worlds we inhabit". In addition Keading received critical praise from Frieze magazine, where critic Ian Chang noted that "the natural and the human are returned to one, and she is both innocent and culpable for our own worry and our thrill".

A commissioned 28-channel video filmstrip entitled SPLASH is on permanent view at the Tom Bradley International Terminal at the Los Angeles Airport.

Keading exhibits nationally and internationally, and along with solo exhibitions she has been included in high-profile exhibitions such as "Unnatural" at the Bass Museum, Miami Beach (2012), "California Video" at the Getty Museum (2008), "C.O.L.A. Exhibition", Japanese American National Museum, Los Angeles (2002), "Made in California" at Los Angeles Contemporary Art Museum (2000), "American '90's Video", Kunstmuseum, Bonn, Germany (1997), the "Third Biennale of Contemporary Art," Lyon, France (1996), and "Avant Garde Video, the First 25 Years" at the Museum of Modern Art in New York (1994).

Keading is the recipient of prestigious awards and grants including the Anonymous Was A Woman Award (2014), and the FOCA Fellowship (2013) granted by Fellows of Contemporary Art 'to mid-career artists in recognition of their significant contributions to the California art scene'. In 2012 Keading received an ARC (Artists Resource for Completion) Grant through the Durfee Foundation administered by CCI (Center for Cultural Innovation) in support of her project The Gospel According to This Moment, a multi-room installation of projected video and sound.

Keading was included in the 2008 survey volume California Video: Artists and Histories published by the Getty Research Institute and highlighting the work and profiles of notable California video artists who influenced the developing medium through experimentation with methods and technologies.

Keading is a faculty member in the Department of Art at the University of California, Riverside.

== List of works ==
- The Bonkers Devotional (2007): In this video installation, large projections of quaking aspen trees wrap around a small room, in which two separate life-sized projections of Keading interacting with a live trained bear named Bonkers, play at right angles. The Bonkers Devotional premiered at La Tôlerie in Video Formes, Clermont-Ferrand, France.
- Backdrop: A 9-channel video installation in which footage of Keading patching a severely leaking water hose with Post-it notes is edited with multiple crashing backdrops and other media, projected on two walls and redistributed across 6 floor monitors.
- Amazing Grace: Keading's first series of short, single-channel videos consisting of unscripted performative content.
- The Gospel According to This Moment: Produced in part with funds from a C.C.I. Artistic Innovation Grant, Anonymous Was A Woman, U.C.R. Fieldwork Research Grant, and a F.O.C.A Fellowship, this multi-room installation was recorded over two consecutive years in the Pawnee National Grasslands, the Colorado plains, Garden City, Kansas, and Scott City, Kansas, and features young residents of Garden City, Kansas. The title was inspired by the 1862 essay "Walking" by David Henry Thoreau.
