= Video Data Bank =

Video art distributor in Chicago, founded 1976

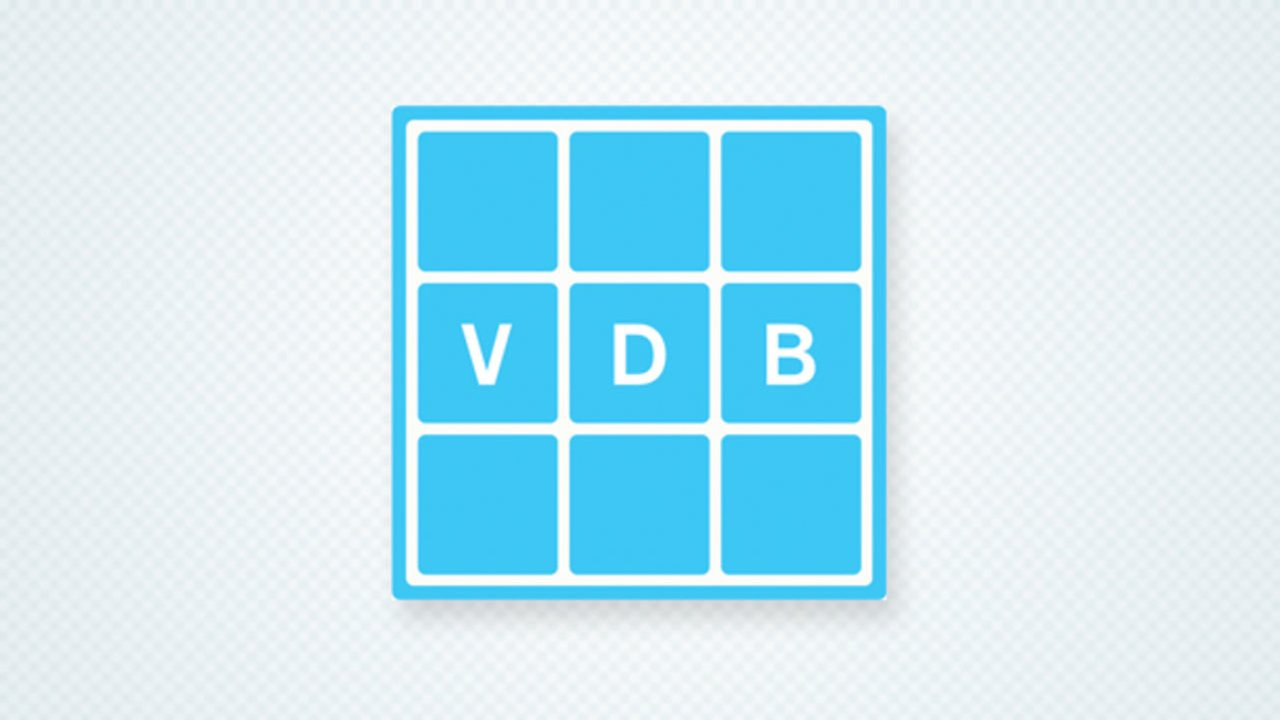
The logo from the School of the Art Institute's Video Data Bank

Video Data Bank (VDB) is an international video art distribution organization and resource in the United States for videos by and about contemporary artists. Located in Chicago, Illinois, VDB was founded at the School of the Art Institute of Chicago in 1976 at the inception of the media arts movement.

VDB provides experimental video art, documentaries made by artists, and interviews with visual artists and critics for a wide range of audiences. These include microcinemas, moving image festivals, media arts centers, universities, libraries, museums, community-based workshops, public television, and cable TV Public-access television centers. Video Data Bank currently holds over 6,000 titles in distribution, by more than 600 artists, available in a variety of screening and archival video formats. It also actively publishes anthologies and curated programs of video art.

The preservation of historic video is an ongoing project of the Video Data Bank. The total holdings, including works both in and out of distribution, include over 10,000 titles of original and in some cases, rarely seen, video art and documentaries from the late 1960s on. In 2015 VDB launched VDB TV, an innovative digital distribution project which provides free, online streaming access to curated programs of video and media art. VDB TV offers viewers across the United States and beyond access to rare video art, the opportunity to engage with programs conceived by a wide range of curators, and original writing, all while ensuring that artists are compensated for their work. The VDB functions as a Department of the School of the Art Institute of Chicago and is supported in part by awards from the National Endowment for the Arts and the Illinois Arts Council.

== History ==
In 1974, VDB co-founders Kate Horsfield and Lyn Blumenthal, graduate students at the School of the Art Institute of Chicago, began conducting video interviews with women artists who they felt were underrepresented critically in the art world. After buying a Panasonic Portapak and successfully conducting talks with painters Joan Mitchell and Agnes Martin and curator Marcia Tucker, the pair decided to continue the series. "It was really a kind of accident,” noted Horsfield in a 2007 interview. “We were looking for inspiration for ourselves, but we were also looking for information on what was happening. If you read art magazines in the early '70s, it was very rare to see any real coverage of any women artists." In 1976 Horsfield and Blumenthal officially founded the Video Data Bank, taking over a small collection of student video productions and interviews that was begun by Phil Morton at the School of the Art Institute of Chicago. They went on to add to the archive, conducting talks with prominent artists of the period such as Alice Neel, Lucy Lippard, Lee Krasner, Barbara Kruger, and the Guerrilla Girls, who appeared wearing their trademark gorilla masks.

Lyn Blumenthal died in 1988, and the VDB maintains the Lyn Blumenthal Memorial Scholarship. Horsfield remained director of the collection until her retirement in 2006, when she was succeeded by Abina Manning, who served as the director until 2021. In 2007 the National Alliance for Media Arts and Culture (NAMAC) presented Video Data Bank with its Outstanding Media Arts Organization Award.

== Collection ==
The Video Data Bank collection includes video produced from 1968 to the present. The early video art represented includes many titles from the Castelli-Sonnabend collection, the first and most prominent collection of video art assembled in the United States, produced between 1968 and 1980. These works represent examples of the first experiments in video art and include conceptual and feminist performances recorded on video, experiments with the video signal, and 'guerilla' documentaries representing a counter-cultural view of the historical events of the 1960s. Artists included are Vito Acconci, Lynda Benglis, Dara Birnbaum, Joan Jonas, Bruce Nauman and William Wegman. Experimental works by Denise Kaprellian-Bornoff, MFA, in collaboration with Phil Morton and with Jack Bornoff, MFA, were among the earliest titles in the collection.

The collection includes the work of contemporary artists who largely address post-modern themes such as feminism, AIDS, gender studies, guerrilla television, technology, and identity, among them Sadie Benning, Jem Cohen, Harun Farocki, Walid Raad, Paul Chan, Guillermo Gómez-Peña, Miranda July, and George Kuchar.

The On Art and Artists collection includes interviews with visual artists, photographers and critics. The interviews focus on the development of the artists' body of work.

In addition, Video Data Bank represents an iimportant archive collection the Videofreex Archive, which chronicles the counter-cultural movement of the 1960s and 1970s as documented by the 10-person collective.

== Surveying the First Decade ==
Surveying the First Decade: Video Art and Alternative Media in the U.S. is a 17-hour compilation of experimental and independent video created from 1968-1980, the first decade of video art production produced in 1995. The anthology includes 68 titles by more than 60 artists, and is curated into eight programs ranging from conceptual, performance-based, feminist, and image-processed works, to documentary and grassroots activism.

Chris Hill, former video curator at Hallwalls Contemporary Arts Center in Buffalo, New York, curated the project.

== Bibliography ==
- Halter, Ed (2007). "Before YouTube". Village Voice. Archived from the original on January 25, 2016.
- Tamblyn, Christine (1991). "Image Processing in Chicago Video Art". Leonardo. 24 (3): 303–310. doi:10.2307/1575572. JSTOR 1575572. S2CID 61756440.
- Horsfield, Kate; Lucas Hilderbrand, eds. (2006). Feedback: The Video Data Bank Catalog of Video Art and Artist Interviews. Philadelphia, PA: Temple University Press. ISBN 1-59213-182-4.
- Juhasz, Alexandra (2001). Women of Vision: Histories in Feminist Film and Video. University of Minnesota Press. ISBN 0-8166-3372-X.
- Horsfield, Kate. "Towards a History of Chicago Video." In Art in Chicago 1945-1995, 128. Chicago: Museum of Contemporary Art, 1996.
