= Corporate Memphis =

Flat minimalistic art style

A Corporate Memphis–style illustration

Corporate Memphis, also known as Alegria, is an art style that features minimalism, flat elements, bright, solid colors, and cartoon-like figures with disproportionate limbs and a lack of (smaller) details on larger figures. Named after the Memphis Group, an Italian design group, the style became popular after Facebook introduced it in 2017 under the name Alegria. It has since been associated with corporate Big Tech in the late 2010s and early 2020s, having been used by companies such as Google, Slack, and WeTransfer. The style has received a polarized reception, with some designers criticizing it for its small color palette and describing it as lazy, while others have defended it on the basis of its depth and variety.

== History ==
The term Corporate Memphis was coined by Mike Merrill. The name originated from the title of an Are.na board that collected early examples, and is a reference to the Memphis Group, a now-defunct 1980s Italian design group known for bright colors, childish patterns, and geometric shapes.

The style dates to 2013, when Apple Inc. switched from skeuomorphism to flat design. However, the modern-day style was created on Facebook in 2017 under the name Alegria by the media agency Buck. The style became popular in the late 2010s and began to be referred to as "globohomo" (global homogenization), Corporate Memphis, or "corporate tech style". It began to trend in editorial illustration and especially the tech industry, which relied on simple, scalable illustrations to fill white space and add character to apps and web pages.

== Visual characteristics ==
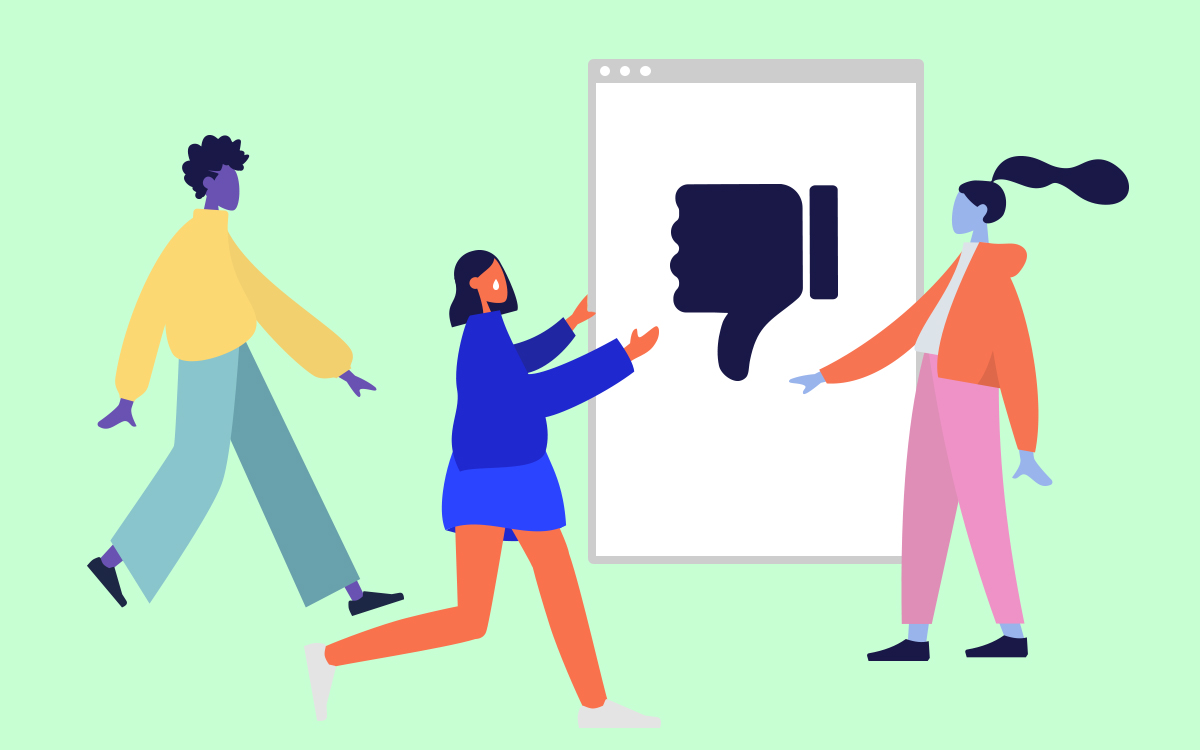
An illustration showcasing figures with long arms and legs and bright colors

The style is minimalist, usually consisting of solid colors, cartoon-like figures, and flat elements. Its elements are distorted; arms are long and elastic, while heads are small, and torsos are disproportionate. Figures are abstract and often use bright colors, such as purple or blue skin, and are shown performing activities such as high-fiving, watering plants, painting, and running. They can also be seen smiling. A variant uses isometric projection. Because of its flat elements, the style can be easily recreated, requiring less skill than skeuomorphic design. While exaggerated proportions had gained prominence in western world by the early 20th century through Modernism, such as in Les Demoiselles d'Avignon (1907) by Pablo Picasso and The Dance (1910) by Henri Matisse, this style became popular because of Facebook.

== Reception and use ==
When it was created in 2017, it was reported to be a success for Facebook, positioning it as a leader in modern design. Soon after, many companies aimed to replicate the style. Image websites such as Adobe's art library, Magnific, and UnDraw have allowed users to adopt the style more easily. The style is used among startups, likely because it is cheaper than stock imagery. Smaller companies also use it to present themselves as "established tech companies". It is also present in Big Tech, including property and financial technology companies. Writer Claire L. Evans wrote that the style makes Big Tech companies "look friendly, approachable, and concerned with human-level interaction and community – which is largely the opposite of what they really are". Companies such as Slack, WeTransfer, MoneyFarm, and Trainline used the Corporate Memphis style, as did Transport for London. Google featured a Corporate Memphis-styled video about Android in 2023. The New Yorker has also used flat art designs by illustrators Malika Favre and Olimpia Zagnoli, including writer Sandra Siemens in her book The Spoon, which featured flat art illustrations by Bea Lozano. Going Under (2020), a video game developed by Aggro Crab, uses the Corporate Memphis art style, featuring minimalist and colorful characters, as well as the new Canadian passport adopted in 2023.

Wired has reported that the style received criticism from graphic designers. Illustrator Jack Hurley described it as lazy, writing that it contains "simple shapes [and] untextured colours", while designer David Rudnick says that the style shows a universe made up of complementing elements where problems have already been resolved; he also criticized the small color palette and lack of depth. Illustrator Julien Posture argues that criticism of the art style is rooted in larger anxieties about the creative industry under capitalism and neoliberalism. On the other hand, Creative Bloq had described it as "a pretty attractive design style". Fast Company said that some scholars and illustrators liked the style, noting its depth and variety. Illustrator Julien Posture said that flat art style is often blamed for the issues the art industry has faced, while illustrator Michele Rosenthal, a self-described "flat-art apologist", defended the art style, despite saying that its distorted elements are associated with corporate styles.

By 2022, Fast Company reported that companies had returned to 3D-like skeuomorphism. Creative Bloq wrote that by 2023, its popularity had fallen due to its "uninspired design" and oversaturation, and that it had started to be "used as a form of parody".

== See also ==
- Capitalist realism
- Frutiger Aero, a prominent design style preceding Corporate Memphis that embraced contrasting skeuomorphism
- Global Village Coffeehouse
- Hyperreality
- Material Design, a Google-derived design language linked to Corporate Memphis
- Metamodernism
- Postmodern art
