= Digital nostalgia =

Interest in earlier digital technology

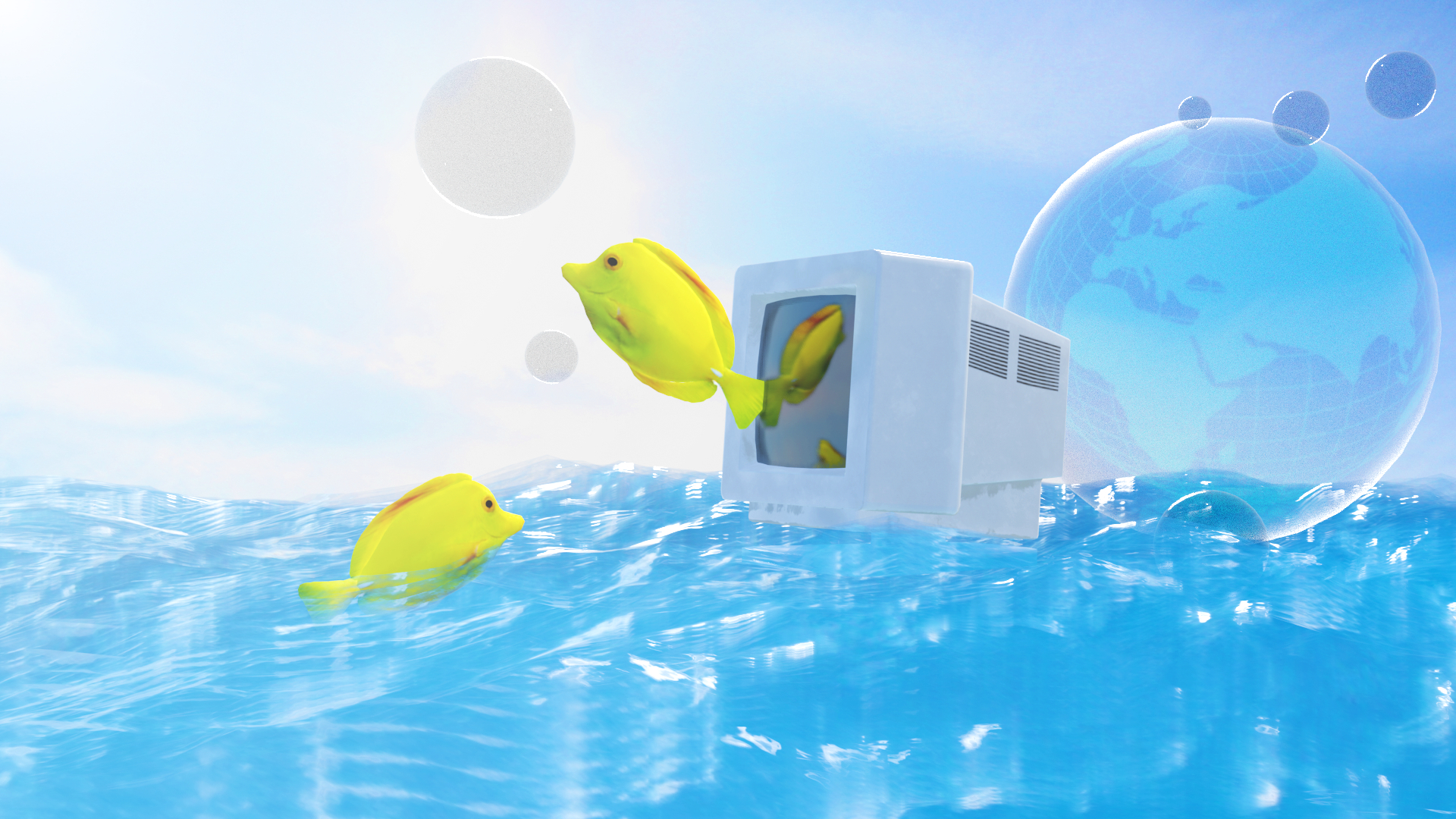
The Frutiger Aero aesthetic, characterized by glossy textures and skeuomorphism, is a primary subject of digital nostalgia for the mid-2000s to early 2010s computer era.

Digital nostalgia is a cultural interest in, and emotional engagement with, earlier digital experiences, aesthetics and media (mid-1990s to early 2010s). It often centres on Internet culture, video games, social media platforms and digital media from previous decades, and is frequently felt by later generations, like Generation Z. who did not necessarily experience the original period themselves.

Scholars have linked digital nostalgia to emotional attachment to earlier digital forms, and to younger users' adoption of styles such as the Y2K aesthetic and Frutiger Aero to express identity and cultural preferences. some marketing strategies deliberately use past-focused digital aesthetics to influence consumer engagement, particularly among Generation Z audiences.

== Analysis ==
Digital nostalgia refers to engagement with and cultural interest in earlier digital aesthetics and media practices, a phenomenon particularly discussed among researchers studying Generation Z.

Scholars have noted that digital nostalgia is linked to emotional engagement with earlier digital forms and aesthetics, particularly among younger users who interact with styles like the Y2K aesthetic revival or Frutiger Aero to express identity and cultural preference.

Studies indicate that some marketing strategies explicitly invoke past-centric digital aesthetics to influence consumer engagement, particularly among Generation Z audiences.

Ivey Business School marketing professor June Cotte has said that nostalgia is most effective in marketing when consumers feel dissatisfied or uncertain about the present, because it offers an emotional refuge and a brief reconnection with a time that feels simpler or safer.

== History ==
=== 1970s–1990s (The period before widespread networking) ===
Although the period before widespread networking was not yet fully digital, computers, early personal devices and the expansion of networked systems laid the groundwork for later nostalgia focused on digital experiences.

=== 1990s–2005 ===
During the 1990s and early 2000s, cultural commentary on Internet nostalgia often centered on earlier digital aesthetics and experiences, such as early web graphics and simple online platforms, which have been revisited in later cultural trends.

=== 2005–2015 ===
The rise of platforms such as Facebook, YouTube, and early Instagram have been discussed as part of this wider interest in earlier digital culture. Archival videos, image sharing, and revisiting old content led to nostalgia becoming more social and immediate, with communities forming around shared memories.

=== 2015–present ===
Psychologist Clay Routledge has observed that younger generations increasingly draw on forms of nostalgia for digital aesthetics and media from before their own lifetimes, describing it as part of a broader pattern of historical nostalgia among Gen Z and Millennials. This phenomenon has been described as an example of anemoia, a term for nostalgia for a time not directly experienced. Nostalgia has also been identified as a driver of the retro gaming trend with older video games and platforms regaining popularity among players revisiting past experiences.

Nostalgia for the older aesthetics of social media platforms also exists. For example, The New York Times reported on the "great freakout" backlash against a modernized Instagram logo in 2026. The company later sought to capitalize on this with a paid subscription which would unlock the "throwback" icon.

=== Social media nostalgia ===
Social media has become an important medium for experiencing and preserving nostalgia. Platforms such as Facebook, Instagram, and YouTube allow users to revisit older posts, photographs, videos, and other digital content, creating opportunities to reconnect with past experiences. Researchers Jungselius and Weilenmann (2023) distinguish between personal social media nostalgia, which involves memories of one's own past online activities, and historical social media nostalgia, which concerns earlier platform practices and digital culture. They also note that revisiting previous posts can evoke both positive and negative emotions, including enjoyment, embarrassment, and longing for earlier experiences.

Social media platforms also influence how digital memories are preserved and revisited. Features that automatically resurface past photographs and posts can encourage users to reflect on earlier periods of their lives. Jacobsen and Beer (2021) examine how platforms transform personal memories into measurable and searchable content, showing how digital systems shape people's experiences of remembering.[13] These practices connect individual nostalgia with the broader development of digital culture and the changing relationship between technology and memory.

=== Usage of the Term ===
The writer Kyle Chayka applied the term "digital nostalgia" in a 2021 New York column on the revival of early internet and video-game aesthetics, describing it as a desire to return to a simpler, messier and more human digital lifestyle. He linked this to fondness for early web spaces such as GeoCities, and to the pixel art and low-polygon graphics of 1990s consoles, which he contrasted with the scale and algorithmic meditation and present-day social platforms.

Other Perspectives

A 2021 essay in the South Korean magazine BE(ATTITUDE) argued that experiences in digital spaces, such as those on the social network Cyworld and early messenger services, can form genuine memories. The author pointed to online expressions of nostalgia when support for Adobe Flash Player ended and when Cyworld disappeared.

== See also ==
- Internet aesthetic
- Vaporwave
- Liminal spaces
