= Anemoia =

Form of nostalgia

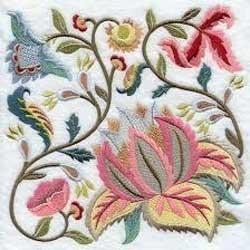
Floral prints are enjoying a revival in the 2020s thanks to anemoia, especially among Generation Z.

Anemoia, also known as vicarious nostalgia, historical nostalgia, or fauxstalgia, is a form of aspirational nostalgia for a period of time that one did not personally experience. It is often evoked through romanticized depictions of the past, which reflect the belief that society is becoming worse and that the past was better. The concept has frequently been discussed in relation to Millennials and Generation Z, especially after the COVID-19 pandemic. Anemoia can exist for a time period itself, or a specific imagined event taking place in that time period. Anemoia is not recognized as a mental disorder or clinical diagnosis.

== History ==
In the 1970s, movies such as Grease and American Graffiti, along with TV shows such as Happy Days, started a trend in entertainment content production that was based on arousing nostalgia for the 1950s in members of the first half of the baby boom generation. However, younger audiences which were not alive during the period were also observed as feeling a mild sense of nostalgia for this era. Attractions like renaissance fairs, retro diners, and the Disney parks' Main Street, U.S.A. also contributed to this effect.

The term "anemoia" was coined in 2012 by John Koenig for his word-construction project, The Dictionary of Obscure Sorrows, where it was defined as "nostalgia for a time you've never known." The term comes from Ancient Greek ἄνεμος (ánemos, “wind”) + -oia, extracted from -noia in loanwords like paranoia.

Starting in the 2000s onwards, younger generations have faced disruptions in education, job markets, cost of living, and quality of life, causing forms of "crisis fatigue" and depression, which was especially prevalent during the COVID-19 pandemic. Often, this leads them to seek solace in earlier eras. People are increasingly seeking comfort and escape by looking back to the past, especially after the challenges of recent years. Gen Z (born between 1997 and 2012) is the generation most affected by anemoia, with 15% preferring to think about the past. Millennials (born between 1981 and 1996) closely follow, with 14% sharing this preference.

== Cultural manifestations ==
Anemoia has been associated with a variety of cultural trends that idealize or recreate earlier historical periods. These manifestations often draw on media, fashion, music, technology, and design to evoke emotional connections to eras that many participants never experienced firsthand.

Millenials and members of Generation Z often feel nostalgic for the 1980s, especially because of media from that decade, as well as the popularity of period piece media set in the 1980s. For example, Kate Bush's song "Running Up That Hill" became popular among Gen Z in 2022 after its appearance in an episode of the Netflix science-fiction drama series Stranger Things, which is set in the 1980s. The song's popularity is widely noted as an example of anemoia among Gen Z. In 2022, Spotify said that Generation Z are more nostalgic for the 1980s than for other decades, based on data from their young listeners.

Researchers Tom van Laer and Davide Orazi described the effect of the series on the younger consumers who never experienced the 1980s, which were actually experienced by Generation X, as "pseudo nostagia". However, Charles Fairchild, associate professor of popular music at the University of Sydney, disputes that concept and label, saying:

You can have nostalgia for things you haven’t directly experienced. What Stranger Things has done is taken this era and put coherence and a story to it. It has taken this music, fashion and popular culture and given it a focus. There’s a shared experience that gives people a vivid and immediate connection, and that’s what the Kate Bush song has done.

Similarly, psychologist Felipe de Brigard has proposed that nostalgia does not include only memories, but also one's yearnings.

In Japan, anemoia for the Shōwa era (1926–1989) and its media is particularly common among Generation Z.

Generation Z also feels anemoia for the 1990s. Among younger Gen Z members and Generation Alpha, 2000s anemoia is also widespread. This may be in part due to the spread of ordinary nostalgia felt by older members of Gen Z for this era.

For Generation Z, anemoia often manifests as a return to Internet aesthetics which reflect the tastes of older time periods, such as cottagecore. The 2000s are especially prevalent in this manifestation of digital anemoia, with the popularity of the Frutiger Aero and Y2K aesthetics. Anemoia has also been manifested as a renewed interest in older technology, such as vinyl records, cassette tapes, analog cameras, CRT television sets, and retro videogames, and an increase in hobbies like knitting, gardening, and fishing. Vintage clothing, such as cardigans and clothes featuring floral patterns, has also been growing in popularity among Millennial and Generation Z consumers.

Anemoia is sometimes related to déjà vu, as the two concepts are manifested through the concept of liminal spaces, which often convey eerieness and a feeling of "having been there before". Some members of Gen Z associate anemoia with the concept of reincarnation and past lives.

== In popular culture ==
- SG Lewis' third studio album was named after the concept of anemoia. In an Instagram post, he stated that the album explored his fascination with musical and cultural periods he never experienced firsthand, describing the album as "the aural projection of that dream" and saying that he wants it to "accompany the moments of today, so that one day people might look back and feel Anemoia about what we experience right now."
- The lead track in Hatchie's third studio album, Liquorice, is titled "Anemoia" and explores the concepts of anemoia and declinism.
- The 2023 short film Anemoia, starring Arielle Prepetit, was screened at the 2024 Nashville Film Festival. It centers on a world, accessible by the main character's stationary bike, where her insecurities manifest as 1950s housewives.
- In 2026, a teaser trailer for a short titled Anemoia, directed by Raphael Cosme, was released. It centers on the characters Cameron and Claire, who are transported to an alternate, liminal dreamcore-style dimension with no other people in it.
- The 2022 short film Anemoia, directed by Zachary Karem, won a New York Emmy Award in 2025. It is a science fiction film about a woman in 2061 obsessed with the past falling in love with the digital avatar of a deceased man who was obsessed with the future. The film was broadcast as part of the series CUNY TV Presents: Chelsea Film Festival.
- The ninth track in Tarja Turunen's 2026 studio album Frisson Noir is named "Anemoia". It is a metaphor for the concept, with "Anemoia" being portrayed as a distant, romanticized wonderland.
- In 2026, Australian metalcore band Northlane announced their seventh studio album, Anemoia. As part of the album's promotion, social media users were prompted to comment the word "Anemoia", which triggered direct messages asking whether they were referencing the psychological concept of nostalgia or the upcoming release.

== See also ==
- Rosy retrospection
- Nostalgia consumption
