= Gimmick =

Novel device or idea designed to attract attention

A gimmick is a novel device or idea designed primarily to attract attention or increase appeal, often with little intrinsic value. When applied to retail marketing, it is a unique or quirky feature designed to make a product or service "stand out" from its competitors. Product gimmicks are sometimes considered mere novelties, and tangential to the product's functioning. Gimmicks are occasionally viewed negatively, but some seemingly trivial gimmicks of the past have evolved into useful, permanent features. In video games, the term is also sometimes used to describe unusual features or playstyles, especially if they are unnecessary or obnoxious.

== Etymology ==
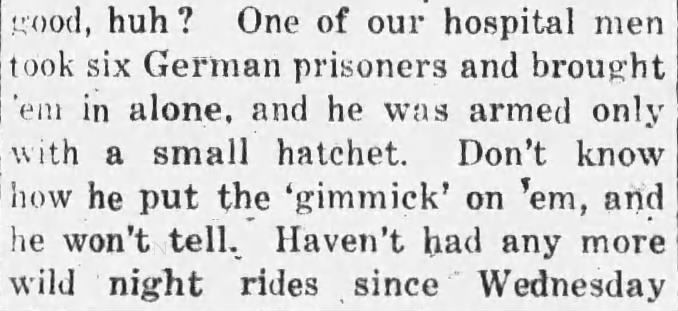
An early use of the word "gimmick", from November 1918 as published in The Tecumseh Chieftain

The origin of the term "gimmick" is uncertain. Etymologists suggest that the term emerged in the United States in the early 20th century. The Oxford Dictionary suggests that it may have originally been a slang term for something that a con artist or magician manipulated to make appearances different from reality, and which gradually changed its meaning to refer to any ‘piece of magicians' apparatus’. The word itself may be an approximate anagram of the word magic.

The term gimmick may also have resulted from alteration to the word gimcrack, which refers to a showy object of little use or value. Another possible origin is that it may have come into use among gaming tables, where it came to refer to "a device used for making a fair game crooked". The term first appeared in American newspapers in the 1910s and 1920s.

== Examples ==
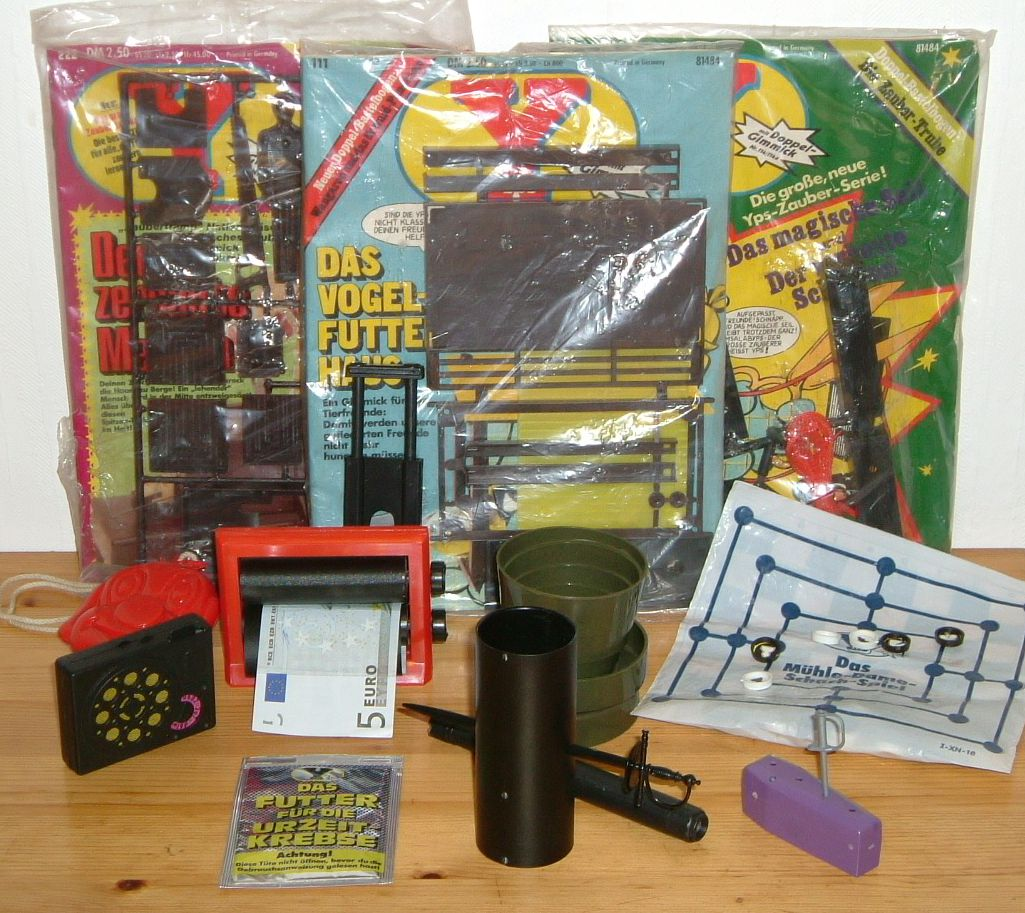
A collection of gimmicks used as covermounts on magazines

In marketing, the use of gimmicks can be an important part of the sales promotions effort. However, finding a successful gimmick for an otherwise mundane product can be challenging, as it requires some effort to match the promotional objectives with the gimmick, and select items which will ideally contribute to enduring brand recall.

Many different types of gimmicks are used in sales promotion and product design. For example, toothbrushes are often given certain gimmicks, such as bright colors, easy-grip handles, or color-changing bristles, in order to appear more interesting to consumers. This is often done in an attempt to appeal to children, who are often more interested in the gimmick than the product.

Musicians often adopt visual gimmicks that do not affect their music. Slash's top hat, Angus Young's schoolboy uniform, makeup used by KISS, and Deadmau5' mouse helmet are examples of such gimmicks. Gimmicks within a musical context are also a central characteristic of the novelty song.

- Special design features, e.g. toothbrushes that change color when they are about to wear out (signaling that the consumer needs to repurchase);
- Novel packaging, e.g. packaging that has residual value once the original contents have been consumed, such as a jam or coffee jar that can be reused as a drinking vessel or storage container;
- Add-on gifts or giveaways, e.g. toys included in children's fast food meal packs, covermounts on magazines, toys in cereal boxes;
- Any novel or unexpected sales promotion.

== Failed gimmicks ==
The McDonald's 1984 Olympics promotion offered free McDonald's food to U.S. customers if the United States won medals in specific events at the 1984 Summer Olympics. Due to the boycott by many nations that had won many medals in prior Olympiads, the U.S. teams won significantly more medals than McDonald's had expected them to, causing shortages at some restaurants.

In 1992, the British division of The Hoover Company launched a disastrous promotional campaign which promised free airline tickets to purchasers of its appliances. The division lost £50 million as a result and was eventually sold.

In 1997, certain Polish tobacco companies were using young sales representatives, traveling around in flashy company branded vehicles, to work clubs and venues where they gave away free cigarettes to patrons as part of the promotional effort. The sales and marketing team at Phillip Morris decided to add another gimmick to the sampling by having the sales reps use trick matches which lit with a simple scratch on jeans. In one case, the stocks of matches carried in a vehicle caught fire killing two sales reps and seriously injuring another. The incident created public relations problems for the company.

== See also ==
- Marketing strategy
- Publicity stunt
