= Global Village Coffeehouse =

Design aesthetic

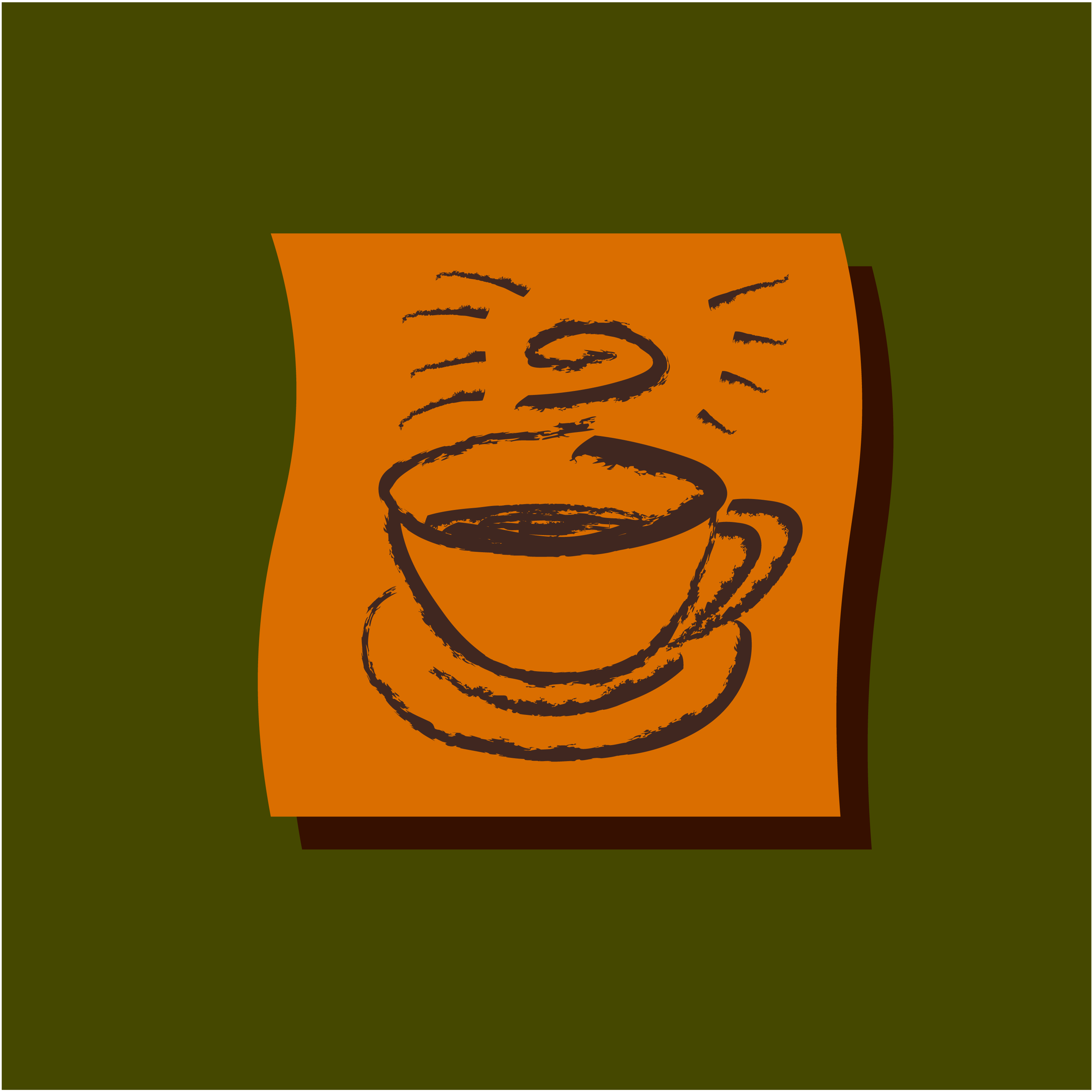
Example of typical Global Village Coffeehouse imagery

Global Village Coffeehouse (GVC) is a design aesthetic that was prevalent from the late 1980s until the early 2000s. The term was coined by Evan Collins, co-founder of the Consumer Aesthetics Research Institute (CARI), in 2018, to describe the illustration style. Medium described CARI as "an umbrella exploring multiple separate aesthetic channels".

The aesthetic was epitomized by the décor of American restaurant chain Panera Bread, and was often seen in the designs of 1990s corporations like Starbucks, Barnes & Noble, and Borders. The style was also common in Microsoft clip art during the mid-to-late 1990s, becoming featured in animations used in both online and paper-copy learning materials into the 2000s.

It is described as having the appearance of "handcraftedness with ancient or tribal imagery, often with earth tones and vaguely nature-oriented motifs like trees, suns, and waves". The Atlantic staff writer Ali Breland described the aesthetic fad as "a reaction to the ascent of the early tech boom and invok[ing] an ambiguous bohemian warmth".

== History ==
The first examples of Global Village Coffeehouse design can be traced back to the late 1980s. The aesthetic was created in response to the growing popularity of the computer and digital design. It was a rejection of digitization and minimalism. During this time, there was also a growing fascination with both global cultures and spirituality as well as an uptick in environmentalism. Consumers were becoming more socially aware and shifting away from the luxury and extravagance of the early 1980s.

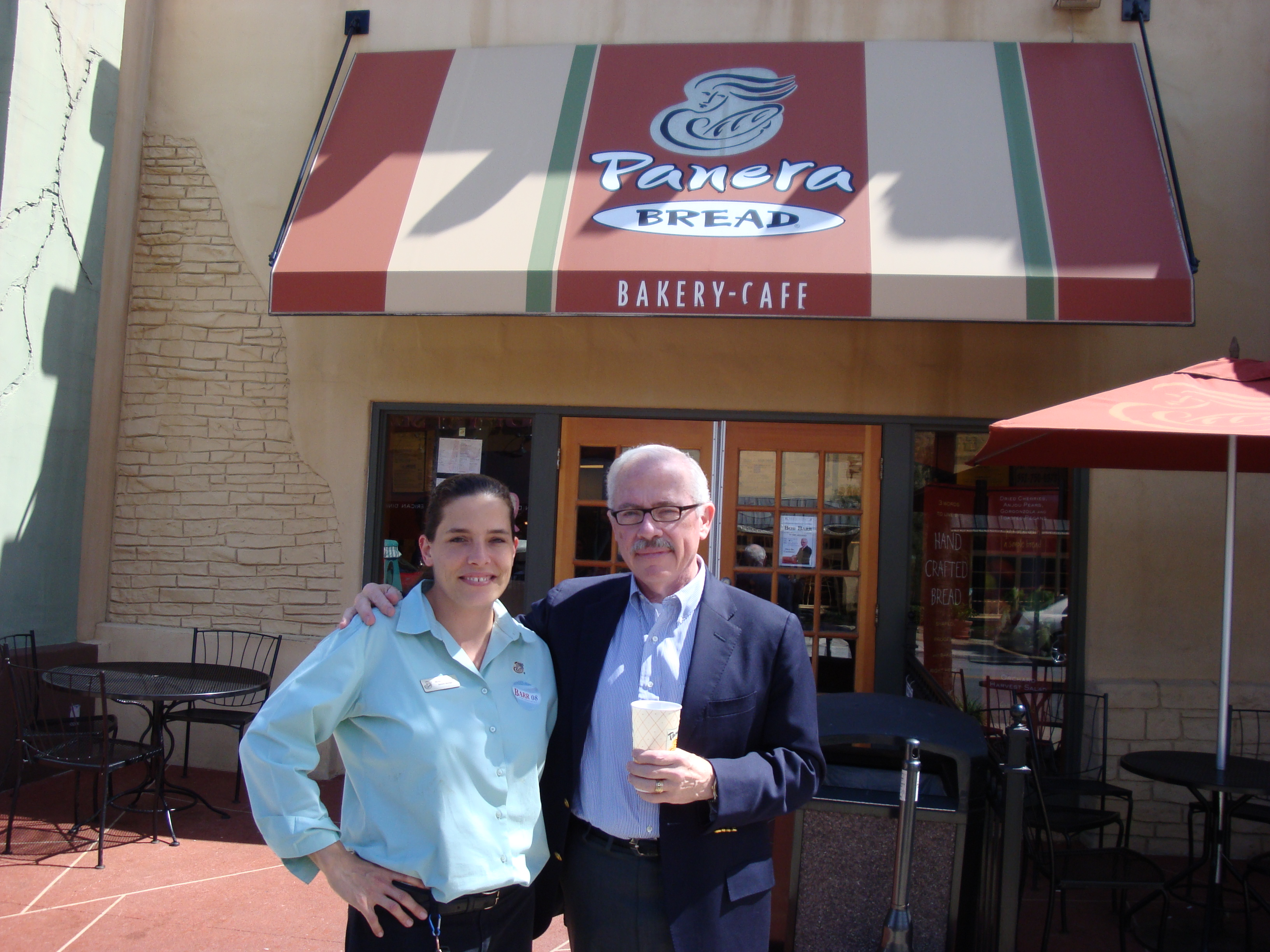
A Panera Bread with an earth-tone awning and logo showing a low-detail woman clutching bread, 2008

The use the term 'global village' was coined by Canadian philosopher Marshall McLuhan to describe, "the world’s 'shrinkage' due to the rise of communication technology", and referred to, "this renewed existence as living under a single 'global village'".

In recent years, there has been a rise in interest in the Global Village Coffeehouse aesthetic. This is largely due to nostalgia from those who were surrounded with GVC design throughout their childhood. Online conversations about the aesthetic began to emerge in 2023 on social media platforms such as TikTok and Instagram. Most of these conversations are reminiscent of the familiarity of the aesthetic, with many citing a sense of comfort felt when viewing images incorporating GVC design. Millennials and Gen Z associate GVC design with trips to places like coffee shops, bookstores, restaurants, and the early internet design of their youth.

In the early 2000s, GVC was replaced by the neo-futuristic, high-tech, and minimalist art style now referred to as the Y2K aesthetic after an oversaturation of the GVC design style, with The Chive commenting, "everyone started doing [GVC design], and the appeal started to fade... What started as a bohemian, indie aesthetic was rapidly adopted by massive corporations".

== Visual characteristics ==
The design goal of the Global Village Coffeehouse aesthetic was to convey earthiness and warmth. It was used to imply to consumers that products were artisanal or to make spaces, such as restaurants and coffee shops, seem warm and inviting. The overarching themes include tribalism, spiritualism, environmentalism, and a sense of global unity. Many pieces also feature influence from artists such as Picasso, Chagall and Matisse.

Common motifs of GVC design include indigenous or tribal imagery and natural imagery such as suns, moons, waves, trees and "aroma swirls". GVC makes use of an earthy color palette, using, "browns, olive greens, brick reds, faded blues, and clay yellows". The art style is defined by simplified line art and a "hand-drawn", analog look.

== See also ==
- Corporate Memphis – Flat minimalistic art style
- Global village – Phrase coined by Marshall McLuhan
- Memphis Design – Italian design collective
- Mission School – Art movement in the 1990s and 2000s in Mission District, San Francisco, California
- Papyrus – Typeface family
