= Olympic Park McDonald's =

Former restaurant in London, England

Coordinates: 51.5371°N 0.0129°W

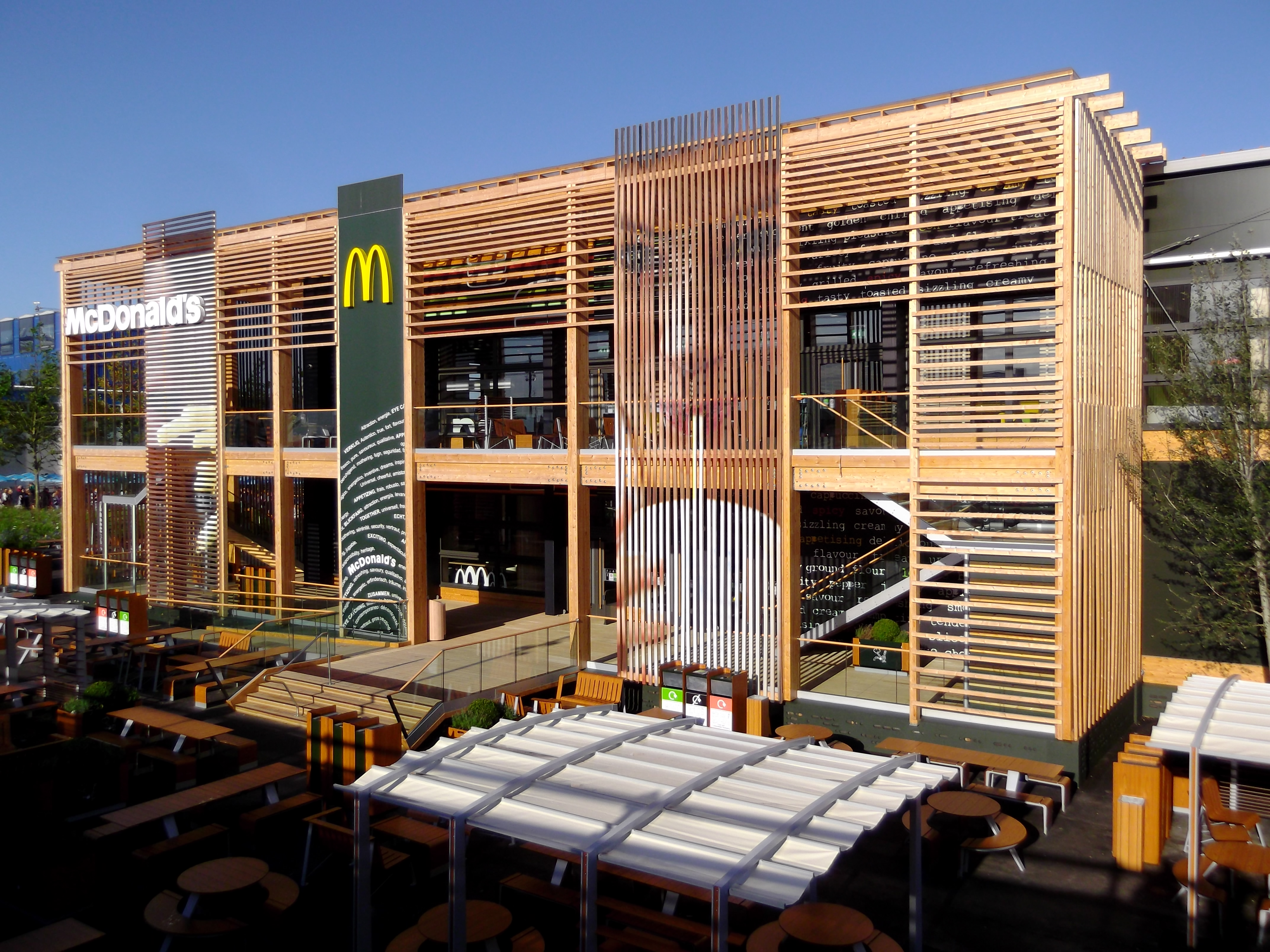
The Olympic Park McDonald's in 2012

The Olympic Park McDonald's was a pop-up restaurant constructed for the 2012 Summer Olympics and Paralympics in Queen Elizabeth Olympic Park, London. During its operation, it was the world's largest McDonald's establishment, and served 14,000 people daily. It operated for six weeks before being dismantled, with most building materials being repurposed or recycled. The restaurant was created as part of a sponsorship deal between the McDonald's corporation and the International Olympic Committee, which faced some criticism in the United Kingdom due to the unhealthy food served by McDonald's.

== History ==
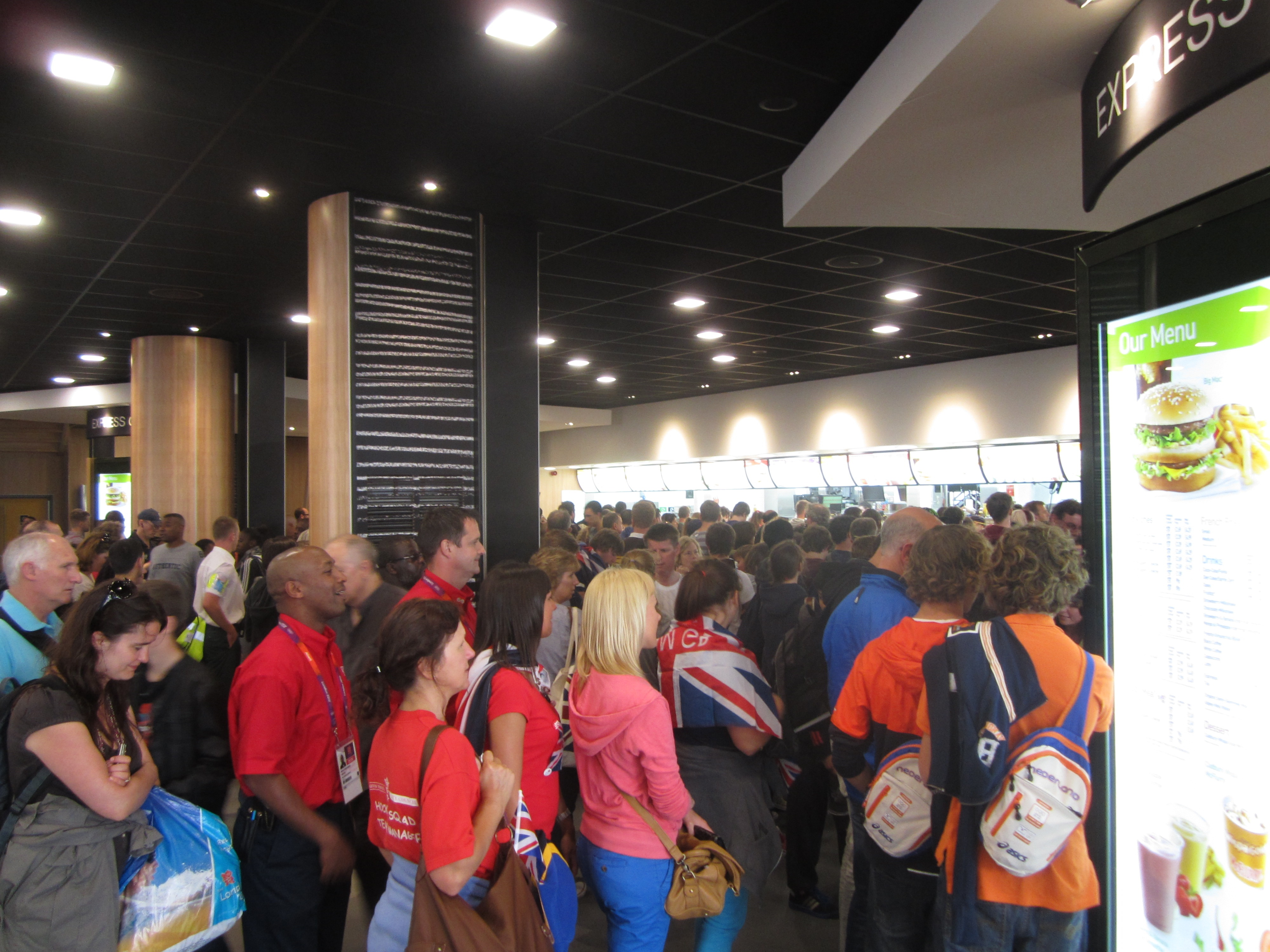
A large queue inside of the Olympic Park McDonald's; the restaurant served 14,000 people every day.

The pop-up restaurant was constructed in 2012 for the Olympics and Paralympics, and was removed upon their completion. During its operation, it was the largest McDonald's restaurant in the world, at 32,000 square feet (3,000 m^{2}) over two floors. The scholar Emirhan Avcı identified characteristics of the Frutiger Aero style in the building's interior design. The restaurant was located 200 yards (180 m) away from the Olympic Stadium.

McDonald's was an official sponsor and partner of the 2012 Olympics and Paralympics, with the International Olympic Committee not allowing any other vendors in the Olympic Park to sell chips unless sold alongside fish so as to avoid competition with the Olympic Park McDonald's. The Academy of Medical Royal Colleges criticised the 2012 Olympics and Paralympics for partnering with the McDonald's corporation, citing a perceived contradiction between the promotion of athleticism and the promotion of McDonald's food. Londoners interviewed by Voice of America in 2012 disapproved of the sponsorship for similar reasons.

During the Games, the restaurant had a staff of 2,000, with 500 working during opening hours. Most of the staff were selected from the top-performing McDonald's employees in the United Kingdom. The Olympic Park restaurant was the first McDonald's location to debut a new employee uniform designed by Wayne Hemingway. It had a seating capacity of 1,500, and served 14,000 people daily. It served an estimated 50,000 Big Mac burgers and 180,000 servings of chips during operation.

The restaurant ended operation after six weeks. Seventy-five per cent of the materials used in the restaurant's construction were designed to be reused or recycled after the Games. Most of the upper floor was constructed from recycled lumber. About 5,500 items from the restaurant, including furniture, kitchen equipment, electrical components, air conditioning units, and timber, were reused across 1,200 other McDonald's restaurants in the United Kingdom. Other items, such as those made of plastic, were recycled. The building was constructed in six weeks and dismantled in four weeks. Jill McDonald, then-CEO of McDonald's UK, said that the restaurant was designed with sustainability in mind.

== See also ==
- List of demolished buildings and structures in London
- Green building in the United Kingdom
- McDonald's 1984 Olympics promotion – 1984 marketing promotion by McDonald's
