= Consumer Aesthetics Research Institute =

Online community

The Consumer Aesthetics Research Institute (CARI) is an online community that began around 2014 and is "dedicated to developing a visual lexicon of consumer ephemera from the 1970s until now".

== History ==
In the early 2010s, Evan Collins participated in the online vaporwave scene largely through the Reddit community r/vaporwave and in some groups on Facebook. He found that the vaporwave scene didn't explore the late 1990s and early 2000s as much as the 1980s to mid-1990s. In August 2014, he watched the music video for "Out of Your Mind" by Victoria Beckham and realized the prevalence of futuristic looks during that era. Inspired by the video, he made a collage in Photoshop to help define the Y2K aesthetic and posted it to the vaporwave subreddit. The post received interest with people asking for more examples. This resulted in him finding around 900 examples and putting them in an album on Imgur in October 2014. He continued to collect examples in all fields including art, music, fashion, architecture, and industrial design, striving for a complete documented understanding of the era.

In 2019, Collins delivered the first presentation on CARI at the Seattle Design Festival.

== Design aesthetics identified ==
Some of the names that CARI have given to particular aesthetics have entered popular usage. These include:

- The Y2K aesthetic, a futuristic aesthetic which spans from the late 1990s to early 2000s, was coined and first described by CARI co-founder Evan Collins
- Gen-X Soft Club, coined by CARI member Sloane Angel Hilton.
- Frutiger Aero, which spans from around 2004 to 2013, was coined by and first described by CARI co-founder Sofi Xian.
- Whimsigoth
- Frasurbane
- Global Village Coffeehouse
- Hipness Purgatory, a Millennial aesthetic associated with the Hipster subculture coined by CARI member Elliott Peebles.
- Corporate Grunge
- Silicon Dreams

== See also ==
- Internet aesthetics
- New Aesthetic
- -core
- Digitalism
