= Lisa's First Word =

- The Simpsons episode
- Lisa says her first word, which is "Bart", to an annoyed Bart.
- Episode no.: Season 4 Episode 10
- Directed by: Mark Kirkland
- Written by: Jeff Martin
- Production code: 9F08
- Original air date: December 3, 1992

Guest appearance
- Elizabeth Taylor as Maggie Simpson

Episode features
- Chalkboard gag: "Teacher is not a leper"
- Couch gag: The Simpsons and a lot of circus performers form a kickline.
- Commentary: Matt Groening; Al Jean; Jeff Martin; Mark Kirkland

Episode chronology
← Previous "Mr. Plow"	Next → "Homer's Triple Bypass"
- The Simpsons season 4

"Lisa's First Word" is the tenth episode of the fourth season of the American animated television series The Simpsons. It was first broadcast on Fox in the United States on December 3, 1992. In the episode, as the Simpson family gathers around Maggie and tries to encourage her to say her first word, Marge reminisces and tells the story of Lisa's first word. Maggie's first word is voiced by Elizabeth Taylor.

The episode was directed by Mark Kirkland and written by Jeff Martin. After its initial airing on Fox, the episode was later released as part of a 1999 video collection: The Simpsons: Greatest Hits, and released again on the 2003 DVD edition of the same collection. The episode features cultural references to the 1981 arcade video game Ms. Pac-Man, the Cyndi Lauper song "Girls Just Want to Have Fun" and Olympic gymnast Shun Fujimoto's performance in the 1976 Summer Olympics in spite of a serious injury, among other things.

"Lisa's First Word" received positive reception from television critics, and acquired a Nielsen rating of 16.6.

== Plot ==
Homer, Marge, Bart, and Lisa are trying to get Maggie to speak. When their attempts prove unsuccessful, Marge decides to tell the story of when Lisa began speaking. The story flashes back to 1983, when Homer, Marge, and Bart lived in an apartment on the Lower East Side of Springfield. When Marge became pregnant again, she and Homer decided to move into a bigger living space. After viewing several unsuitable properties within their budget, they bought a house on Evergreen Terrace; persuaded by Homer, Grampa Simpson had sold his own house to give Homer and Marge enough money to buy their new house. In 1984, the Simpsons moved into the house and met their new next-door neighbors, Ned Flanders and his family with Ned allowing Homer to borrow his TV tray (which he had kept for eight years).

Meanwhile, Krusty the Clown began a promotion for the 1984 Summer Olympics with his Krusty Burger chain. The promotion is a "scratch-and-win" game where customers would win a free Krusty Burger if the United States won a gold medal, but the game cards were rigged to feature events that athletes from Communist countries were most likely to win. However, just as the promotion was put into effect, Krusty received word of the Soviet boycott of the Olympics; the campaign thus ended up giving away more free burgers than anticipated, causing Krusty to eventually lose US$44 million (equivalent to about $136 million in 2025).

Bart was forced to give up his crib so Lisa could have it. Knowing Bart was a fan of Krusty, Homer built him a clown-themed bed. However, because of Homer's poor woodworking skills, the bed looked like an evil clown, which terrified Bart. Soon, Lisa was born, and Bart became jealous of the attention she received from relatives and family friends. After several failed attempts to make Lisa look bad, and then several failed attempts to get rid of her, Bart decided to run away from home and accuses Lisa for ruining his life. As he packed his possessions, Lisa said her first word, "Bart". Bart was thrilled, and Marge explained that Lisa adored him. Bart and Lisa hugged each other and bonded over how funny it was that they both called Homer by his name, rather than "Daddy" as he wished.

In the present, while Bart and Lisa argue, Homer puts Maggie to bed; he tells her, "The sooner kids talk, the sooner they talk back. I hope you never say a word." As soon as he turns off the light and closes the door, Maggie takes her pacifier out of her mouth and, unheard by anyone else, says "Daddy".

== Production ==
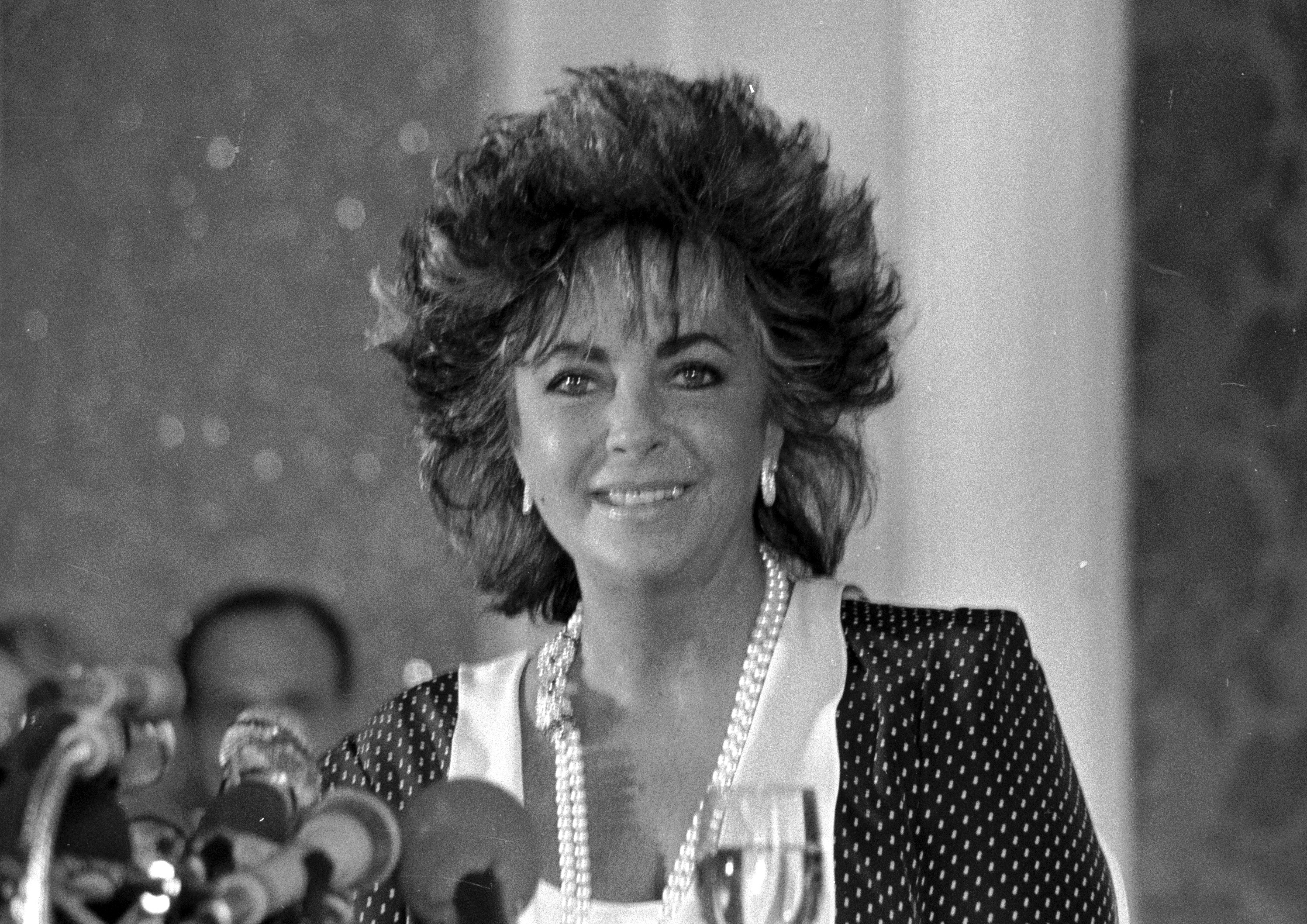
Elizabeth Taylor provided the voice of Maggie in this episode.

"Lisa's First Word" was written by Jeff Martin and directed by Mark Kirkland. Mike Reiss and Al Jean were discussing having an episode where Maggie would say her first word and Reiss thought it would be cute to have her say "daddy" when no one could hear her. Martin was assigned to write the episode because he had done "I Married Marge", another flashback episode. Martin was excited to do another flashback episode because he thought it was fun to check out old newspapers and go back and see what was in the news back in 1983 and 1984. Martin felt it was a good way of finding a new set of things to make jokes about. The extended couch gag was added since the episode was about thirty seconds too short to air.

In the episode, Homer builds a scary clown-shaped bed for Bart. The scene was inspired by Mike Reiss, whose dad had built him a clown-shaped bed when he was younger, and just like Bart, Reiss was scared of sleeping in it. As the flashback begins in 1983, a young Homer strolls down the street, singing Cyndi Lauper's song "Girls Just Want to Have Fun", which was released that year. The idea for this sequence came from animation director Chuck Sheetz, who suggested it because the length of the final version of the episode was too short. The Fox censors wrote a note concerning Homer's line, "Bart can kiss my hairy, yellow butt!" after Marge tells Homer that Bart might be jealous of baby Lisa, citing that the line is considered "coarse", due to the fact that Bart was two during the flashback.

Maggie's first word was provided by the Academy Award-winning actress Elizabeth Taylor, who would also voice herself in the season four finale, "Krusty Gets Kancelled". While promoting the episode, the producers initially did not reveal who the voice of Maggie would be, prompting speculation as to the identity of the actress. Although it was only one word, the voice came out "too sexy" and Taylor had to record the part numerous times before the producers were satisfied and thought it sounded like a baby. Several sources, including John Ortved's The Simpsons history article "Simpsons Family Values" in Vanity Fair, have reported that after Taylor had been made to repeatedly record the line, she said "fuck you" to series creator Matt Groening and stormed out of the studio. Groening recounted this event on a 1994 appearance on Late Night with Conan O'Brien, and was also quoted by the New York Daily News in 2007 as saying "We did 24 takes, but they were always too sexual. Finally, Liz said, 'F— you,' and walked out." However, Groening later denied the story in the DVD commentary for the episode "Gump Roast", while Jean stated in a piece after Taylor's death in 2011 that Taylor had said "fuck you" in jest and in Maggie's voice and did not storm out. Yeardley Smith supports the latter as well, tweeting she "didn't storm out but she did take exception to being asked to say 'Daddy' 20 times & she let us know by saying 'fuck you' when she was done." Nancy Cartwright also mentions the incident in her book My Life as a 10-Year-Old Boy, but states Taylor jokingly ad-libbed "fuck you Daddy" as an initial sound check for Sam Simon.

== Cultural references ==
The Springfield Shopper headline from the day Lisa was born ("Mondale to Hart: Where's the beef?") uses the then-current advertising slogan for Wendy's. Mondale, a candidate in the 1984 presidential election, used the "Where's the beef?" phrase at an election rally in 1984 while mocking one of his opponents. Marge sets the scene for her story of Lisa's first word with references to the 1981 arcade video game Ms. Pac-Man and the American actor Joe Piscopo. The group of boys hanging around the apartment building is a reference to the popular 1930s boys group The Dead End Kids. When Lisa is born, Homer says he has already started saving for her college fund in Lincoln Savings and Loan, which suffered a scandalous financial collapse in the late 1980s causing thousands of investors to lose their life savings. The episode features an Itchy & Scratchy cartoon called "100-Yard Gash", which uses the music from Chariots of Fire (1981).

The Olympic promotion by Krusty Burger is based on the 1984 Olympics promotion by McDonald's, in which McDonald's visitors could win a Big Mac, french fries, a drink, or even a cash prize up to $10,000 if Team USA won a medal in the visitor's listed event. McDonald's lost millions on the promotion due to the 1984 Summer Olympics boycott by the Soviet Union, as happened to Krusty. At one point in the episode, Dr. Hibbert refers to Olympic gymnastic medalist Mary Lou Retton.

== Reception ==
In its original American broadcast, "Lisa's First Word" was watched by 28.6 million viewers, the most-watched episode of the season. It finished thirteenth in the ratings for the week of November 30 to December 6, 1992, with a Nielsen rating of 16.6. The episode was the highest-rated show on Fox that week. It acquired the highest national Nielsen rating of the show since the season two episode "Bart Gets an 'F'" aired on October 11, 1990.

Since airing, the episode has received mostly positive reviews from television critics. Gary Russell and Gareth Roberts, the authors of the book I Can't Believe It's a Bigger and Better Updated Unofficial Simpsons Guide, said the episode is a "convincing portrait of young marriage and hardship in the days of Reaganomics—and the biggest name to guest voice gets the littlest, but the most significant, to say". When asked to pick his favorite season out of The Simpsons seasons one through twenty, Paul Lane of the Niagara Gazette picked season four and highlighted "the sweetly funny" "Lisa's First Word". David Johnson at DVD Verdict named it "one of the greatest flashback episodes". Dave Manley at DVDActive said in a review of The Simpsons: Greatest Hits DVD that it is "one of the better episodes and probably my personal favourite on the disc, although most Simpsons connoisseurs would probably go for the previous episode [on the DVD]", and added that there are "some great parodies in the episode too". The Orlando Sentinel's Gregory Hardy named it the fourteenth best episode of the show with a sports theme (the Olympics in this case).

Elizabeth Taylor's performance as Maggie was praised by critics. She was named the 13th greatest guest spot in the history of the show by IGN. Taylor also appeared on AOL's list of their favorite 25 Simpsons guest stars. Todd Everett at Variety called the last scene in the episode, where Maggie speaks her first word, "quite a heart-melter". He added that "it is probably no surprise that the casting of Elizabeth Taylor as the voice for baby Maggie Simpson's first word was a publicity stunt [...] No mind, the episode in question delivered well-rounded view of series' multiple attractions." Total Film's Nathan Ditum ranked her performance as the best guest appearance in the show's history. Fox rebroadcast the episode on April 3, 2011, in memory of Taylor, following her death on March 23.

== Legacy ==
=== "Can't sleep, clown will eat me" ===
Young Bart in his clown bed, poorly constructed by Homer

Inspired by an event in The Simpsons writer Mike Reiss' childhood, young Bart does not want to give up sleeping in the crib to make way for his newborn sister. Noticing Bart's affection for Krusty the Clown but unable to afford a professionally built Krusty-themed bed, Homer decides to build a clown-themed bed himself to please his son. However, because of Homer's poor handicraft skills, the bed takes on an ominous appearance and frightens Bart, especially in his darkened bedroom. In his first night in the new bed, far from "laughing himself to sleep", Bart imagines that the face on the headboard of the bed comes to life, intoning with evil glee, "if you should die before you wake...", before bursting into evil cackling.

The next morning, Bart is curled up into the fetal position on the floor next to the sofa downstairs, repeatedly uttering the phrase "can't sleep, clown will eat me..." The line inspired the Alice Cooper song "Can't Sleep, Clowns Will Eat Me" from the 2001 album Dragontown. The phrase has since found its way into popular use.

When Homer and Marge must leave for the hospital for Lisa's birth, they leave Bart in the care of Ned Flanders. Bart finds himself bored at the Flanders' house and wants to go home, but quickly changes his mind when he sees the clown bed in his bedroom window. When Bart attempts to run away, the bed appears in his bedroom again. The bed appears again in the episode "The Kids Are All Fight", where it eventually falls apart.

== Merchandise ==
"Lisa's First Word" originally aired on the Fox network in the United States on December 3, 1992. The episode was selected for release in a 1999 video collection of selected episodes titled: The Simpsons: Greatest Hits. Other episodes included in the collection set were "Simpsons Roasting on an Open Fire", "Sweet Seymour Skinner's Baadasssss Song", "Trash of the Titans", and "Bart Gets an 'F'". It was included in The Simpsons season 4 DVD set, which was released on June 15, 2004, as The Simpsons — The Complete Fourth Season. The episode was again included in the 2003 DVD release of the "Greatest Hits" set, but this time the set did not include "Trash of the Titans".
