= Blobject =

Design term for a rounded, curvilinear object

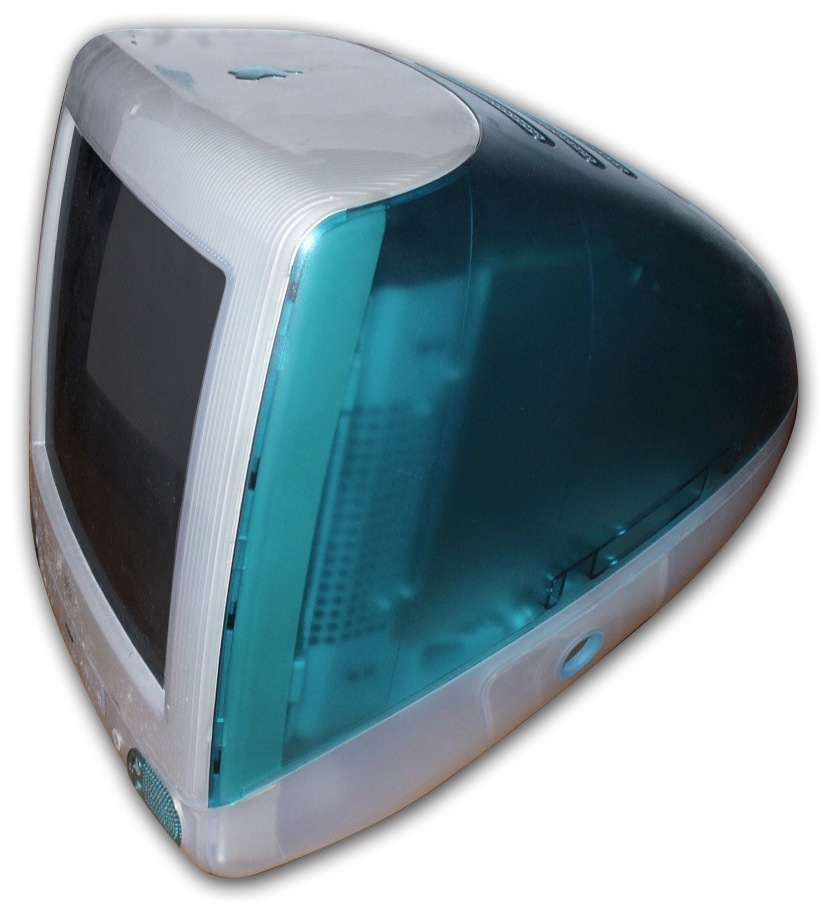
The 1998 iMac G3, one of the products identified as bringing blobjects to the mass market

A blobject is a design product with smooth, flowing curves and no sharp edges, often brightly coloured. The word is a portmanteau of "blob" and "object".

The term is associated with the design critic Steven Skov Holt and the designer Karim Rashid, and is most often applied to a wave of plastic consumer products from the late 1990s, such as the iMac G3 and the Volkswagen New Beetle.

== Characteristics ==
Blobjects can be made in any size or scale, from office and kitchen items to cars. Common materials include plastics such as polycarbonate, polypropylene and polyethylene, as well as metal and rubber.

Holt has defined a blobject as a colourful, mass-produced, plastic-based, emotionally engaging consumer product with a curvilinear, flowing shape, and considers this fluid form its most distinctive feature. Not every rounded object qualifies: Holt does not consider the iPod, with its rounded rectangle, a true blobject.

Supporters of the style link it to the optimism of the late 1990s and the dot-com boom. Mara Holt Skov has described it as "an expression of possibility, a new futurism".

== Origin of the term ==
The term is usually credited to Steven Skov Holt, a professor of industrial design at the California College of the Arts and former editor of I.D. magazine. Holt began using the word in the late 1980s to describe the curved forms then appearing in home furnishings and cars; the San Jose Museum of Art dates this to 1989. The term appeared in print in an article by Phil Patton in Esquire in December 1993.

Karim Rashid, born in Cairo in 1960 and raised in Toronto, is closely associated with the style. The Christian Science Monitor describes him as one of the designers who popularized it. His Garbo waste bin for Umbra (1996) sold more than a million units within two years.

== History ==
=== Precursors ===
While often viewed as a modern concept, blobject-like forms can be traced back to prehistoric sculptures such as the Venus of Willendorf. Similar characteristics appeared in the early 20th century in the work of Joan Miró and Jean Arp, and after World War II in home goods such as the La Chaise chair.

=== 1990s and the 1998 turning point ===
In the 1990s, designers such as Philippe Starck, Marc Newson and Karim Rashid produced many curvilinear designs. Holt and Mara Holt Skov identify 1998 as the year blobjects reached the mass market, with the Apple iMac, the Volkswagen New Beetle and the Nike Triax watch. The Christian Science Monitor called the iMac "the first huggable computer".

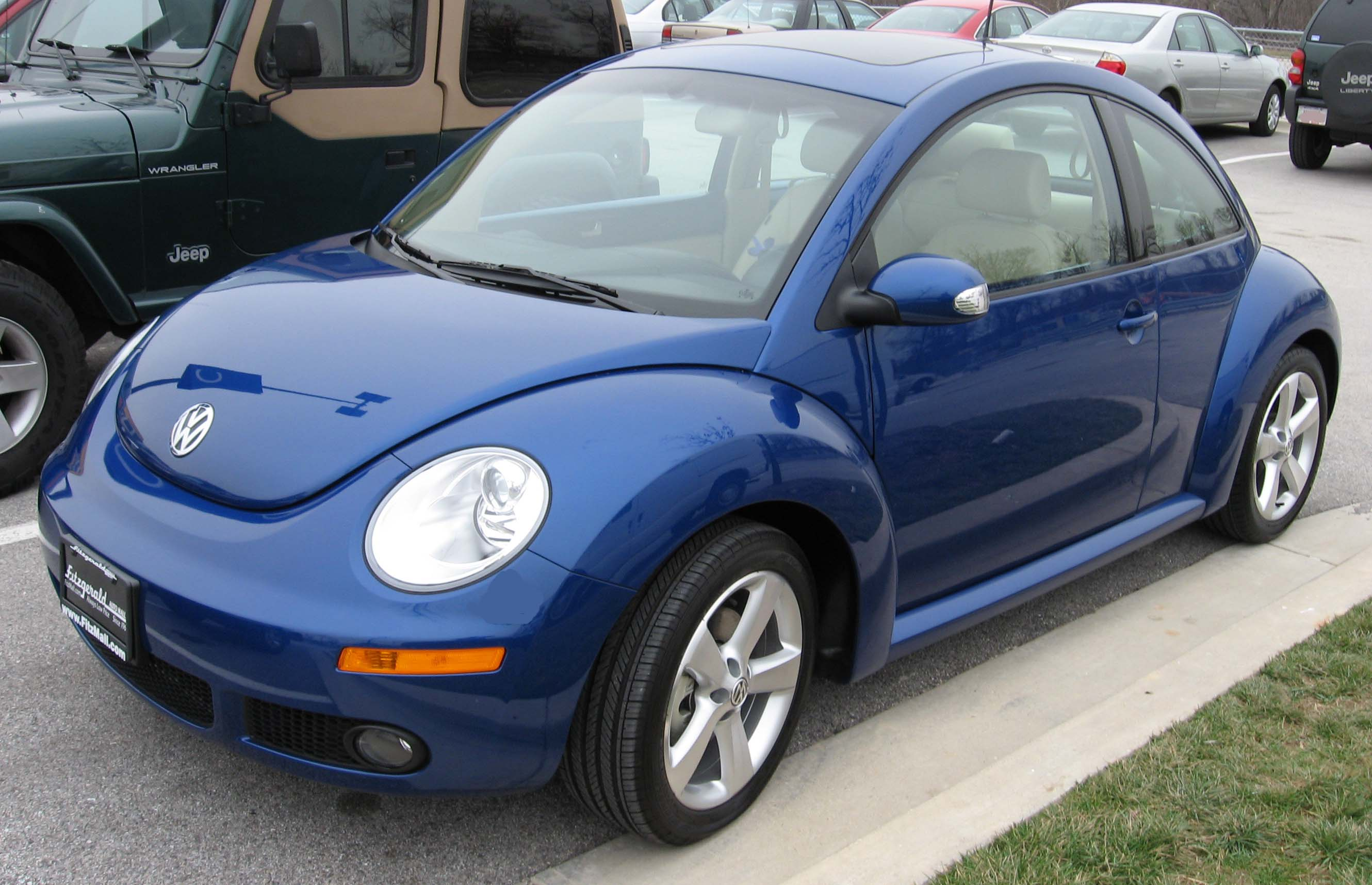
The Volkswagen New Beetle, released in 1998

The trend has been linked to advances in computer-aided design, rapid prototyping, materials and injection moulding, which let designers explore new shapes and transparency and translucency without significant extra production costs.

=== Blobjects & Beyond exhibition (2005) ===
In 2005, the San Jose Museum of Art held Blobjects & Beyond: The New Fluidity in Design, its first design exhibition, curated by Steven Skov Holt and Mara Holt Skov. The exhibition ran until July 10, 2005, and covered product and industrial design, architecture, graphic design, digital media, furniture and fashion. Works shown included Marc Newson's Lockheed Lounge, Ross Lovegrove's Ty Nant water bottle, Rashid's dish soaps for Method, and the 1998 Smart car. A companion book was published by Chronicle Books.

== In other fields ==
Blobjects can also be found in other areas of visual culture, including furniture (Marc Newson), clothing (Rei Kawakubo) and painting (Rex Ray).

In architecture, Greg Lynn applied the word "blob" to buildings in the mid-1990s, and the critic Herbert Muschamp helped popularize the trend in The New York Times in 2000. See Blobitecture.

The science fiction writer Bruce Sterling discussed blobjects in Tomorrow Now (2002), and in 2004 gave a talk at SIGGRAPH titled "When Blobjects Rule the Earth", which linked them to digital fabrication.

== Criticism ==
Holt has acknowledged that blobs "can too easily be seen as superficial", while arguing that they combine ecological concerns, emotion, cultural expression and advanced technology. The architecture critic Philip Nobel argued that "blobism" in architecture was simply formalism, driven by form rather than use or structure.

== See also ==
- Blobitecture
- Y2K aesthetic
- Organic design
