= MoneyFarm =

Online investment advisor

Moneyfarm
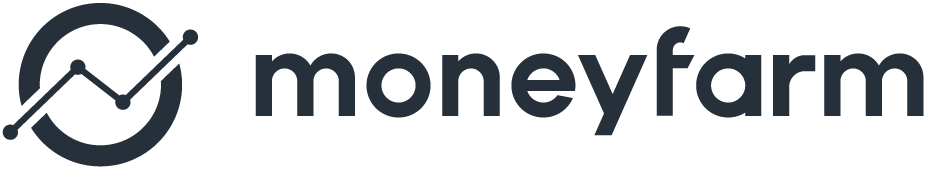
- Type: Private
- Industry: Digital Wealth Management
- Founded: 2011; 15 years ago in Milan, Italy
- Founders: Giovanni Daprà; Paolo Galvani
- Headquarters: London; Milan; Cagliari
- Number of locations: 3 offices
- Area served: United Kingdom; Italy
- Key people: Paolo Galvani (chairman); Giovanni Daprà (CEO); Isabelle Pinson (CCPO); Richard Flax (CIO); Emanuele Blanco (CTO); Giuseppe Trettenero (CFO)
- Products: ISA; GIA; SIPP; ESG
- Services: Investment advice; Active portfolio management
- AUM: ▲£4.0 billion
- Number of employees: ▲239
- Website: www.moneyfarm.com

Moneyfarm is an online investment advisor product that offers a robo-adviser. It is one of the largest digital wealth management companies in Europe, regulated by the FCA (UK) and CONSOB (ITA). The company that owns the product operates as MFM Investment Ltd.

== Company background ==
Moneyfarm was founded in March 2011 by Paolo Galvani, chairman, and Giovanni Daprà, CEO. In March 2018, Moneyfarm launched digital SIPP, a self-invested personal pension. Moneyfarm operates from offices in London, Milan, and Cagliari. Moneyfarm received £96 million in backing from Allianz, Poste Italiane, Cabot Square Capital, and Venture Capital Fund, United Ventures.

== Product ==
Moneyfarm creates a profile based on a customer's investment target and risk propensity. Through the product, customers can invest in commodities, real estate, bonds, and stocks. In 2025, a customer must invest at least £500 to use Moneyfarm. It offers investment funds with seven tiers of risk. The company periodically rebalances the investments in a customer's portfolio. Customers can enroll their funds in a environmental, social, and governance program which generally comes up with elevated fees. The product allows customers to manage their own investments or to hire an independent financial advisor.

The Guardian journalist Holly Mead praised the product for making viewing a portfolio's components straightforward. She cited the ability to see how funds are allocated across geographical areas, asset categories, and market segments, along with a clear overview of them.
