= Frutiger Aero =

Design style and Internet aesthetic

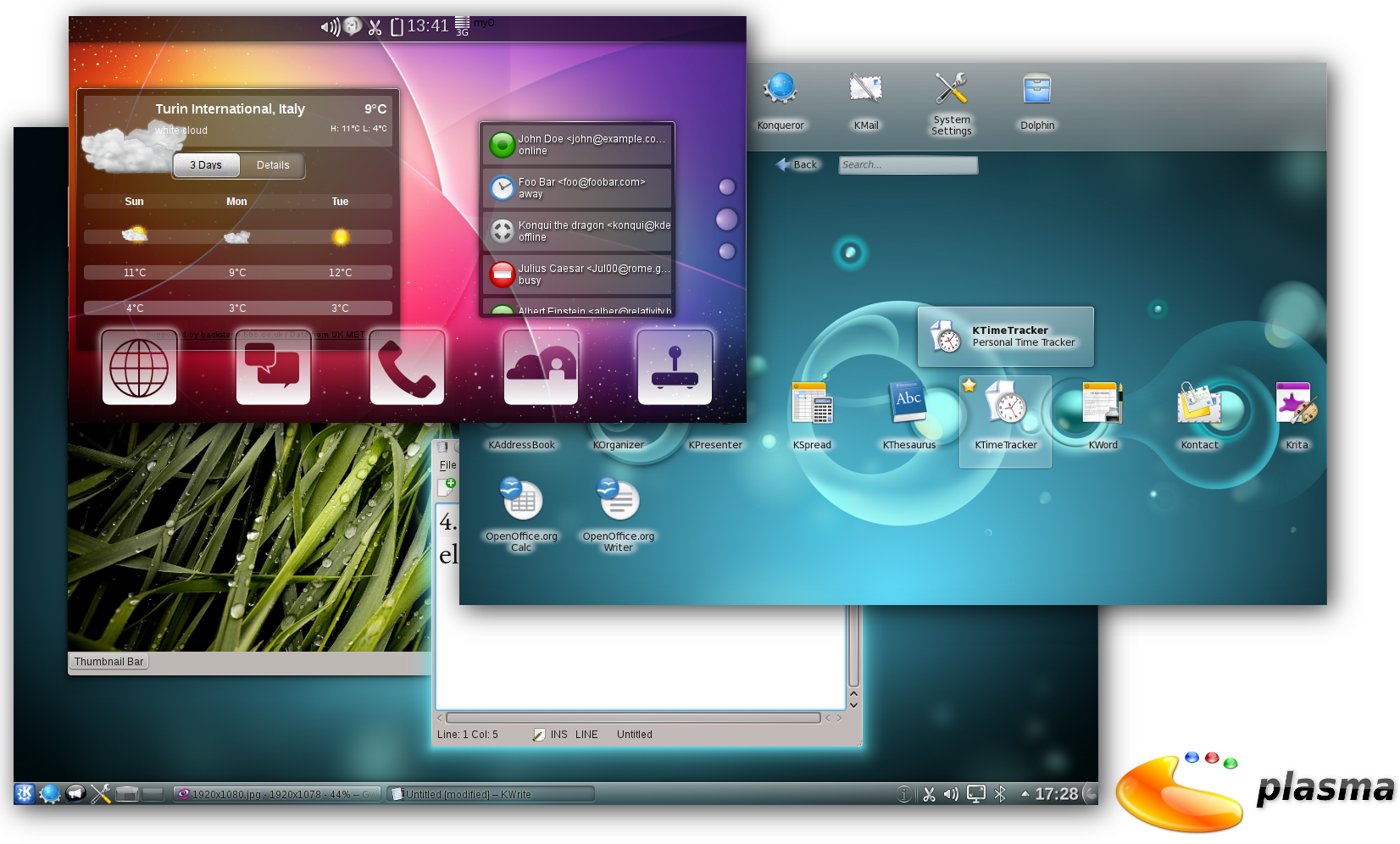
Many user interfaces from the 2000s (KDE Plasma 4 pictured) exemplify the Frutiger Aero style.

Frutiger Aero (/ˌfruːtɪɡər ˈɛəroʊ/) is a design style that was prevalent from the mid-2000s to the early 2010s. It originated in user interface designs but later influenced various other media. It was named in 2018 by Sofi Xian (Note: Formerly Sofia Lee) of the Consumer Aesthetics Research Institute, and reemerged in 2023 as an Internet aesthetic, becoming popular with Generation Z as an object of nostalgia. Frutiger Aero art features optimistic themes of technology in harmony with nature and often includes natural imagery, bright colors, and skeuomorphic elements.

== History ==
Frutiger Aero was prevalent from the mid-2000s to the early 2010s, (Note: Most critics and scholars found the style's period of influence to begin in 2004 and end in 2013, although estimates varied between the early 2000s to 2014 at the extremes.) succeeding the Y2K aesthetic, which was popular from the late 1990s to the early 2000s. The name Frutiger Aero is derived from the Frutiger typeface, designed by Adrian Frutiger, and the Windows Aero design language. (Note: Le Monde's Laure Coromines felt that both the Frutiger font family and Windows Aero were "essential elements of Internet culture in the 2000s". Emirhan Avcı, however, noted that the Frutiger family was never used in a major user interface associated with the style.) The style had no common name at the height of its influence; it was named in 2018 by Sofi Xian of the Consumer Aesthetics Research Institute. Its reflective elements also led it to be known as Web 2.0 Gloss.

The style was used in many kinds of media from the period, including advertisements, video game consoles such as the Wii, and in interior design. (Note: Other media identified as Frutiger Aero–like by scholars and critics include devices such as the first-generation iPhone (2007) and the Samsung Galaxy S (2010); video games such as Wii Sports (2006), Purble Place (2007), The Sims 3 (2009), and Fruit Ninja (2010); the designs of the Collina Strada fashion brand; and the Y3000 flavor of Coca-Cola. The Guardian's Alaina Demopoulos also highlighted merchandise in the Frutiger Aero style being sold on Etsy.) Windows Aero – a design language used in Windows Vista (2006) – was among the first to feature characteristics of Frutiger Aero. The scholar Emirhan Avcı called Vista "one of the first mature examples" of the style, and, after its release, Microsoft published a style guide their designers had referenced when creating it. Windows 7 (2009), Vista's successor, expanded on these characteristics. Frutiger Aero waned in popularity in the early 2010s and was largely replaced by flat design. Avcı identified a transitional style, Frutiger Metro, named after the Metro design language used in Windows 8 (2012), which shared features of Frutiger Aero and later minimalist interfaces.

The style experienced a resurgence of interest as an Internet aesthetic in early 2023 and through 2024, particularly among members of Generation Z who felt it to be nostalgic. Critics noted that Frutiger Aero posts received high viewership on YouTube, TikTok, and similar websites. Ellie Violet Bramley of The Guardian identified this as a reaction to the artificial intelligence boom, and Laura Holliday of Dazed wrote that the style was revived to provide an alternative to the minimalism of user interfaces at the time. TechRadar's Jamie Richards wrote that Apple's Liquid Glass design language, released in 2025, was likely influenced by Frutiger Aero.

== Themes and characteristics ==
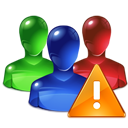
Vibrant colors, three-dimensional graphics, and glossy textures are characteristic of Frutiger Aero design.

Frutiger Aero is rooted in both technological advancements and cultural events such as the Y2K problem and the transition to Web 2.0 during the late 1990s and early 2000s. Although the style is futuristic, nature is a central theme, and the style often depicts the natural as "intertwined" with a digital future, according to Avcı. Common design motifs include blue skies, grass, aurorae, lens flares, and bokeh effects. The style also incorporates elements of the seapunk subculture – primarily present on Tumblr in the 2010s – including water and tropical fish, influenced by the video game Ecco the Dolphin (1992). The digital culture scholar Laura Goudet said that the style represented "a utopia where efficiency and the environment coexist", conceived during a period of general "naïveté" about the harmful effects of technology.

A group of media researchers discussed Frutiger Aero as part of a larger trend of "fascination with outdated futures", which they studied on social media platforms in the early 2020s. They wrote that the reemergence had a "political dimension", as they found many social media users associated it with bygone ideations of a techno-utopian future. Several posts framed the images as "the future we were promised but never delivered." Le Monde's Laure Coromines felt that the style's renewed popularity indicated a nostalgia for what was viewed as "a kind of Garden of Eden". In an interview for Dazed in 2023, Amanda Brennan stated that the style's natural imagery and optimism may have contributed to the renewed interest, corresponding to generally increased environmental consciousness and shifts in attitudes toward climate change.

Frutiger Aero art often depicts the natural in tandem with digital elements.

The writer Allie Rowbottom said that Generation Z – raised with continual access to technology and the Internet – was especially drawn to the style's depiction of "the harmonious marriage between nature and technology". Scholars and critics have contrasted Frutiger Aero with the Y2K aesthetic; according to Brennan, "There's a lot of hopefulness in this aesthetic that Y2K doesn't have". Hannah Craggs of TrendBible, also interviewing with Dazed, said that "times of unrest and uncertainty" motivated interest in the style as a source of comforting nostalgia. Rowbottom also pointed to the absence of humans in Frutiger Aero art, attributing it to Generation Z's aversion to the anthropocentrism and "oppressive beauty standards" prevalent on social media. The Guardian's Alaina Demopoulos found, however, that many social media users implemented generative artificial intelligence to make illustrations in the style, which she felt "sort of ruins the aura." Avcı also wrote that these posts, which could be mistaken for real imagery, created a "false historical narrative" that misinformed viewers of the style's eminence.

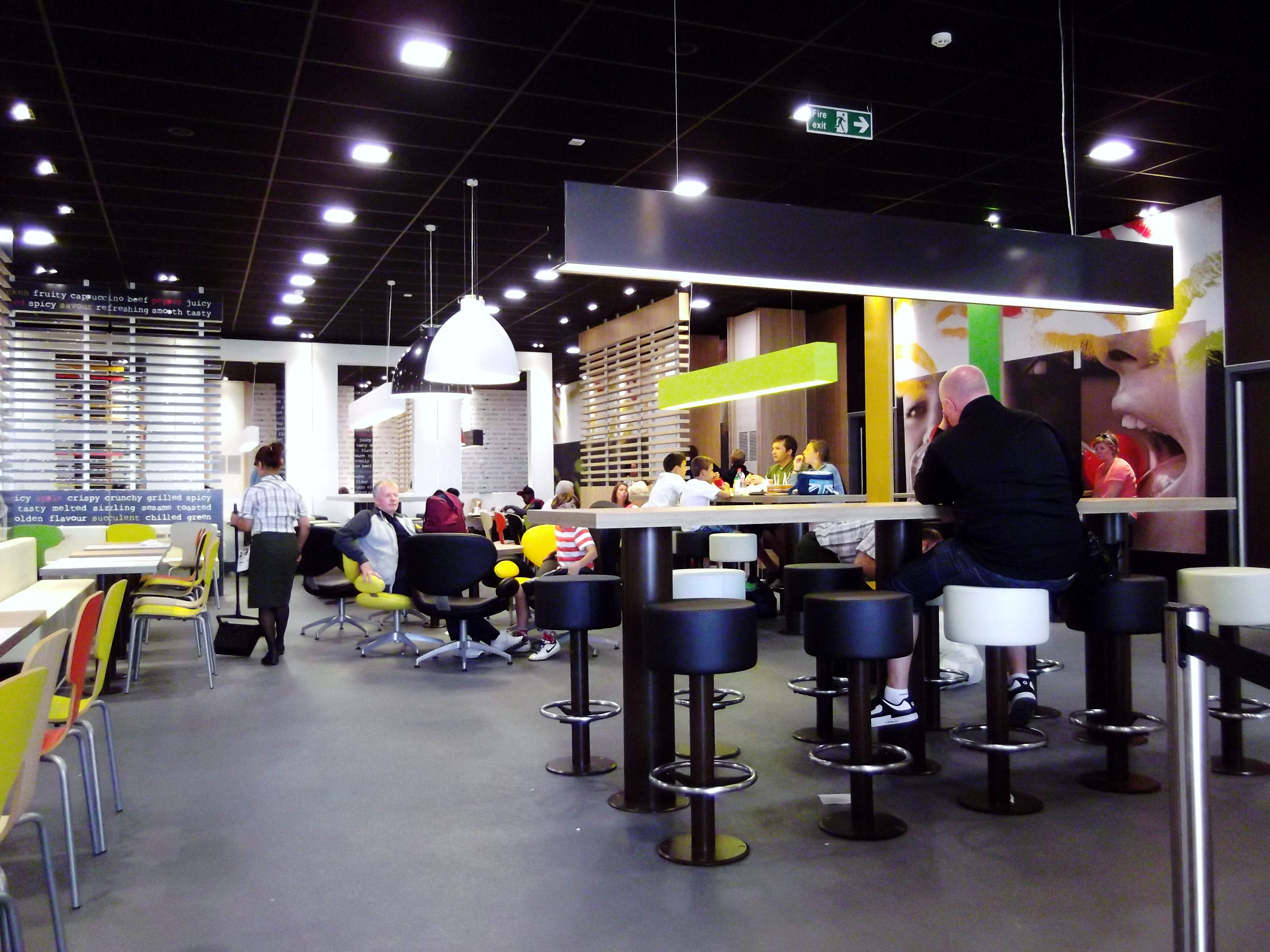
Emirhan Avcı cited the Olympic Park McDonald's as an example of interior design influenced by Frutiger Aero.

One of the style's distinctive features is skeuomorphism: the visualization of real objects in the designs. These were represented using three-dimensional graphics with reflective, glossy surfaces, which were particularly observable in mobile application icons. Several scholars argued that user interface designs used skeuomorphism to present electronics with gentle and familiar traits, easing the transition for new users during the mass adoption of home computers and touchscreen electronics in the early 2000s. This influenced the inclusion of elements such as rounded edges, natural imagery, and exotic animals. Frutiger Aero also utilizes bright colors: yellows, and particularly blues and greens to align with its natural influences. Avcı interpreted the palette choices as reflective of the optimistic theme of the style.

Avcı stated that virtual aesthetics began to influence architectural design trends at the end of the 20th century, attributed to the increased capability of computer-aided design programs. He studied the impact of the style on interior design, examining several buildings including the Olympic Park McDonald's restaurant in London and a Poste Italiane office designed by Massimo Iosa Ghini. He found that a number of digital features were replicated through the choices of materials; for example, the stylistic tendency to include translucent elements influenced the use of glass and acrylic panels.

== See also ==
- Aqua – User interface design language used in Apple's operating systems
- Bliss – Default wallpaper of Windows XP
- Blobject – Design term for a rounded, curvilinear object
- Crystal icons – Icon set for Linux distributions
- Vaporwave – Online musical genre and visual aesthetic
