= McDonald's 1984 Olympics promotion =

1984 marketing promotion by McDonald's

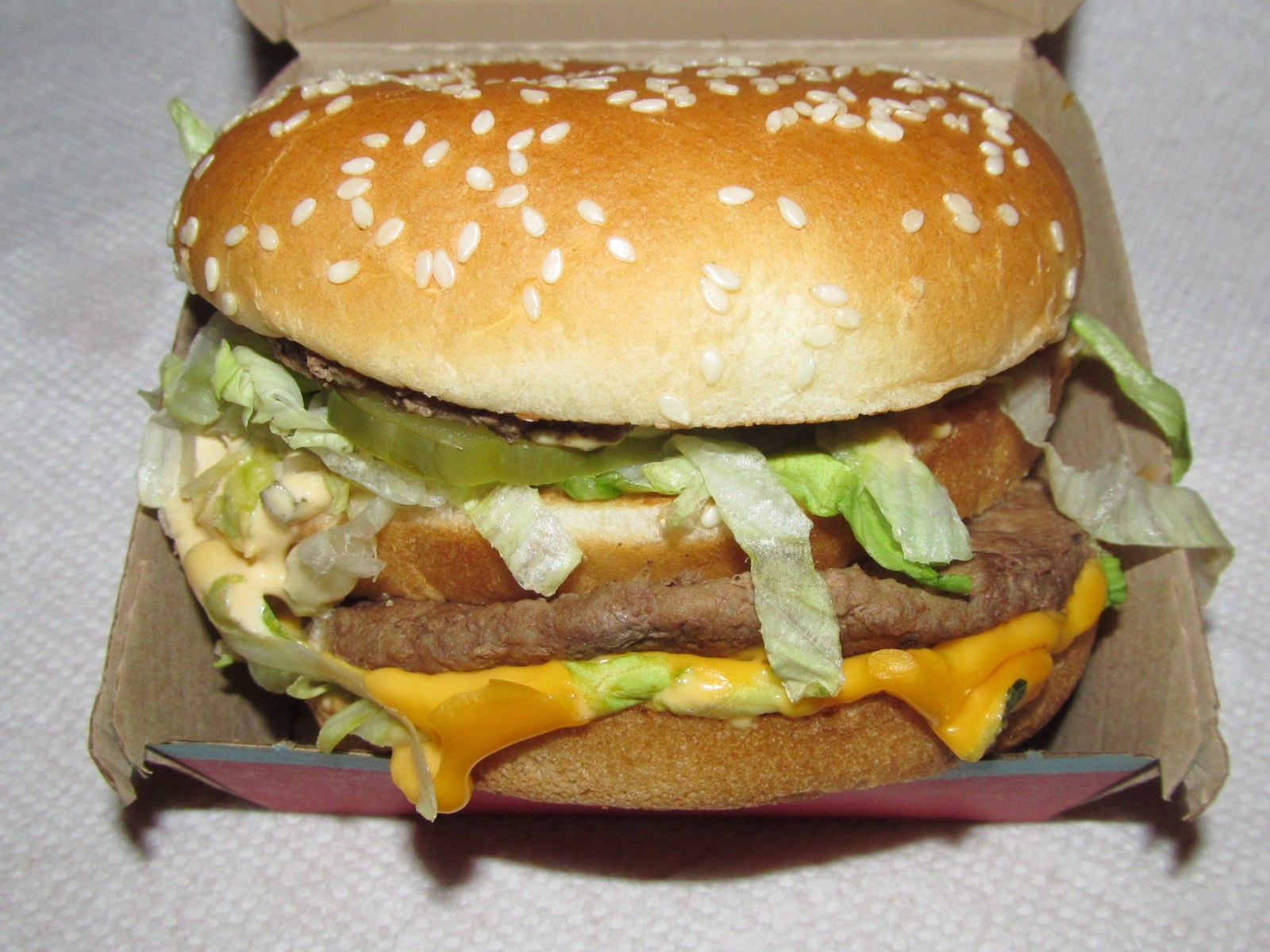
Several restaurants struggled to keep up with customers trading in their promotion cards for Big Macs, as the American Olympic Team won many gold medals.

A promotion by American restaurant chain McDonald's ran during the 1984 Summer Olympics. Advertised with the slogan "When the U.S. Wins, You Win", the promotion gave free food items to customers if the U.S. Olympic team won medals at certain events. When the Soviet Union and other Eastern Bloc countries boycotted the 1984 Summer Olympics, American athletes faced less competition and won significantly more medals than expected. McDonald's is estimated to have lost millions of dollars on the promotion as a result, and the event is often remembered as an example of a marketing blunder.

== History ==
With a history of using athletic prowess to sell fast food products, American restaurant chain McDonald's purchased major sponsor status for the 1984 Los Angeles Olympics, in addition to sponsoring several American teams competing at the event. McDonald's also invested in a major advertising campaign around the event. In addition to the sponsorships and advertising, McDonald's prepared to repeat a successful giveaway promotion they deployed during the 1976 Summer Olympics in Montréal, Quebec, Canada, where customers were offered a chance to win products when the American team won a medal.

In preparation for the promotion, McDonald's had scratch-off cards printed with different Olympic events. The cards were handed to customers at concessions in the United States and they could be redeemed for a specific food item if the American Olympic Team won a medal at that specific event. A gold medal was worth a Big Mac, silver an order of french fries, and bronze a Coca-Cola. The slogan "When the U.S. Wins, You Win." was adopted for the campaign. McDonald's had made their cost estimates for the promotion based on the American medal count at the 1976 Summer Olympics, which was 94 medals, including 34 gold medals.

The campaign was given an unexpected boost when the Soviet Union, along with the thirteen Eastern Bloc countries (except Romania), boycotted the 1984 Summer Olympics. Iran and Libya also declined to participate. With several of the Olympic powerhouse teams absent, the U.S. easily dominated the 1984 Olympic Games and walked away with 174 medals, 83 of them gold.

As the Games started and the American teams conquered podiums, customers were enthusiastic about exchanging their cards for free food. More cards were being handed out with each new order, offering more giveaway opportunities. Some 6,600 outlets reportedly faced shortages of the promoted items, especially the Big Macs. McDonald's have been discreet about the cost of the promotion, saying only it was the most expensive promotion in the franchise's history to date. Marketing experts estimate it in the millions of dollars, especially since the chain normally makes a generous profit on each of the Big Macs it was now handing out for free.

Despite the financial costs incurred in 1984, McDonald's repeated the "When the U.S. Wins, You Win" food prize promotion using the same game-piece format in both 1988 (where America won 36 gold medals) and 1996 (where America won 37 gold medals). McDonald's would continue its partnership with the Olympic Games until 2017.

== Cultural references ==
The Simpsons parodied the McDonald's campaign in the 1992 episode "Lisa's First Word". In the episode, which involves a flashback to 1984, Krusty the Clown's Krusty Burger chain holds a promotion for the 1984 Olympic Games. The promotion involves "scratch-and-win" cards which reveal an event. Like the McDonald's game, if the U.S. Olympic Team won gold in that event, the card could be redeemed for a free Krusty Burger. But unknown to the public, the cards were rigged on events that athletes from Communist countries are most likely to win. However, when Krusty receives word of the Soviet boycott, his promotional scheme backfires and he is told he stands to personally lose an estimated $44,000,000 (equivalent to about $136,355,000 in 2025) from all the free Krusty Burgers given to the citizens of Springfield. On the final day of the Olympic Games, a furious Krusty appears on live TV, smoking and crying, calling his customers "pigs" and vowing to personally spit in every 50th burger, to which Homer Simpson (watching the TV while sitting on the couch surrounded by piles of Krusty Burgers) replies, "I like those odds!".
