= Y2K aesthetic =

Internet aesthetic

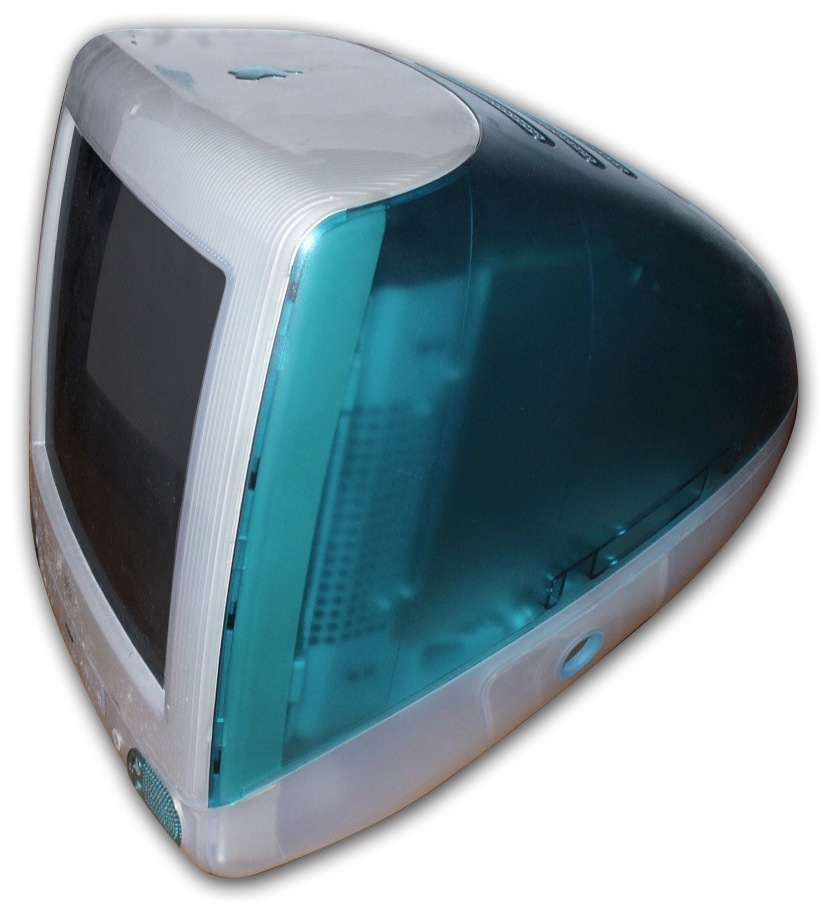
Apple's iMac G3, an example of the blobject-style design common in Y2K aesthetics

Y2K is an internet aesthetic based around products, styles, and fashion of the late 1990s and early 2000s. These styles were preceded by the Memphis Design aesthetic of the mid-1980s to mid-1990s, and were succeeded by the Frutiger Aero aesthetic of the mid-2000s to early-2010s. The name Y2K is derived from an abbreviation coined by programmer David Eddy for the year 2000 and its potential computer errors. The Y2K aesthetic can include synthetic or metallic materials, inflatable furniture, and computer interfaces of the dotcom era.

As the Y2K term gained more mainstream usage in the 2020s, it began to be used more broadly to encompass 2000s fashion aesthetics, with the term Cybercore being occasionally used as a synonym for the original retrofuturistic aesthetic.

== History ==
Y2K has been compared to "nowstalgia", a phenomenon where culture changes so quickly that newer generations miss things from the recent past. The fast change in the 2000s came from the September 11 attacks, the war on terror, and the decade's quick advancements in technology, such as the iPod. The term Y2K comes from the year 2000 problem.

Evan Collins, the founder of the Consumer Aesthetics Research Institute, created the "Y2K Aesthetic Institute", which Vice described as "the best source for the Y2K". Additionally, The Designers Republic, a British graphic design collective, is sometimes associated with popularizing Y2K futurism. Scholar Xiaochun Yang notes that the aesthetics' resurgence correlates with the COVID-19 pandemic and the corresponding economic recession.

Originally, Y2K as an internet aesthetic retrospectively referred to a retrofuturistic art movement, characterized by metallic materials (also called chromecore), blobjects, and reflective clothing. As the term "Y2K" garnered mainstream attention over the course of the 2020s, this term has since expanded to refer to 2000s fashion in general; the former definition of Y2K is sometimes known as Cybercore to differentiate itself from the latter.

Y2K aesthetics are particularly popular in East Asian countries such as Japan, China, and South Korea. In China, outfits are often posted to the hashtag Y2K on Xiaohongshu, and the style has been worn by celebrities in fashion magazines like SuperELLE. The style has seen notable success within the K-pop and J-pop industries, with the fashion of 2020s girl groups such as Aespa and XG being a notable influence on Japan's popular "Y3K" fashion trend, alongside the "cyber fashion" style of '90s Harajuku.

== Characteristics ==
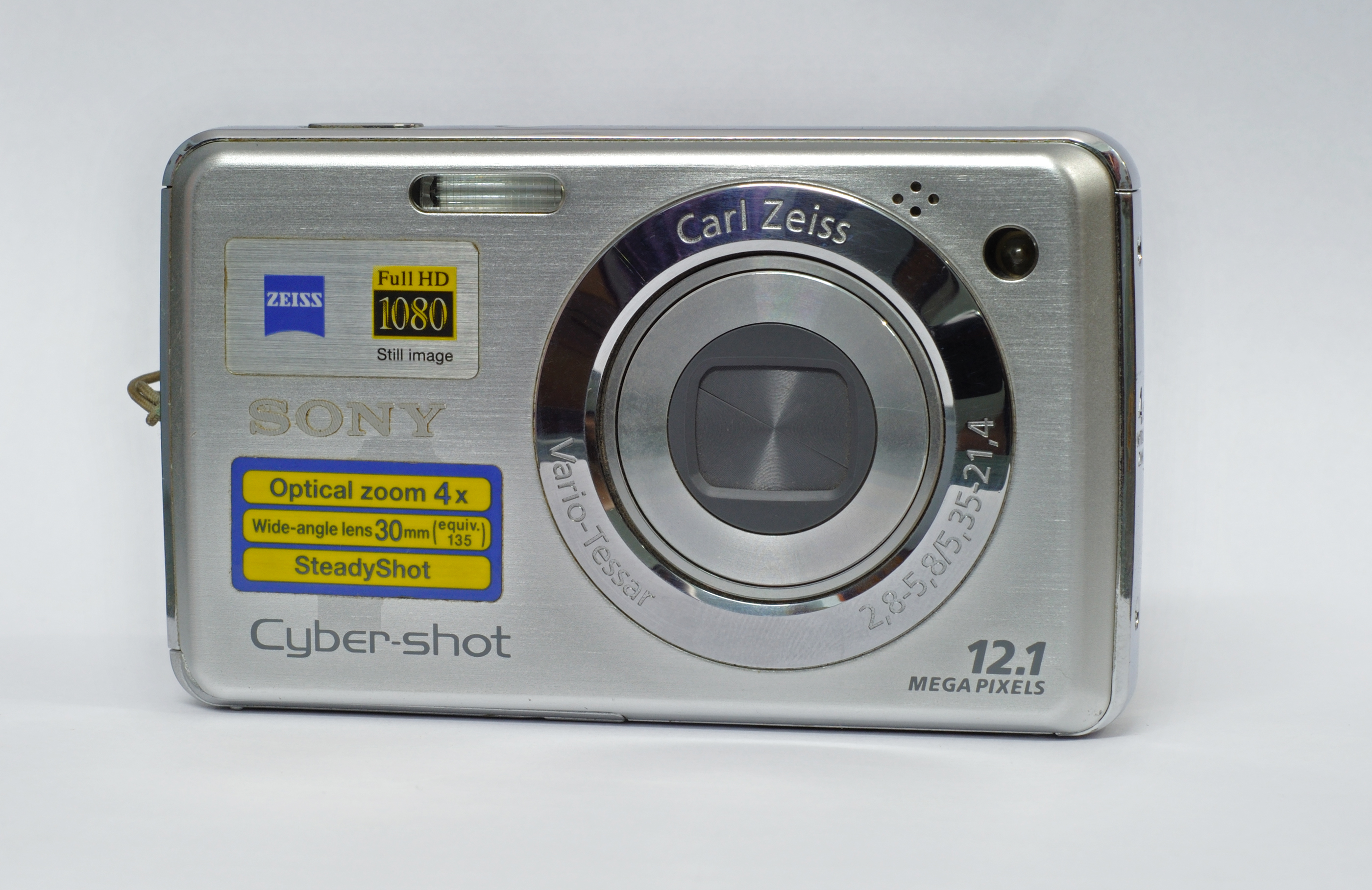
Digital cameras were becoming mainstream during the 2000s and are commonly associated with the Y2K aesthetic.

Y2K is a retrofuturistic aesthetic, taking notable influence from design trends of the 1970s. Bright colors such as lime, orange, and hot pink are often paired with sleek whites and metallic chrome. Animal prints and psychedelic patterns are a holdover from the 1990s, often in the aforementioned bright colors. Technology of the era, such as computers and game consoles, often featured clear accents, or were entirely made of translucent casing in vibrant colors, while sometimes including glitter. Graphic design often features gradients, chunky or rounded fonts, 3D elements, and metallic or glossy effects.

Popular furniture in Y2K interior design includes butterfly chairs, bean bags, and anything inflatable. Other decor is often whimsical or playful, with staples being lava lamps, canopies, and beaded curtains. Numerous throw pillows are also frequently used to decorate rooms. Out-of-date 2000s technology like flip phones, old computers, and digital cameras are sometimes used as decor. Fashion features much more overt sci-fi influence, with common elements including PVC clothing, futuristic sunglasses, tracksuits, platform shoes, and wearable technology. Y2K may also borrow elements from McBling aesthetic, which is sometimes conflated.

== Related terms ==
In 2022, Office magazine stated that the term "New Nostalgia", described as "a trend wistful of the Y2K era", is often associated with musician PinkPantheress, who had originally coined the phrase in 2021 as a genre to describe her sound.

== See also ==
- -core
- Internet aesthetics
- Memphis Design
- Frutiger Aero
- Vaporwave
- 1990s in fashion
- 2000s in fashion
- Y2K pop
