= Green Gallery (Milwaukee) =

Contemporary art gallery located in Milwaukee, Wisconsin

Coordinates: 43°02′59.2″N 87°53′42.1″W

The Green Gallery is a contemporary art gallery located in Milwaukee, Wisconsin.

== History ==
The gallery was founded by John Riepenhoff in the attic of his apartment in Milwaukee's Riverwest neighborhood in 2003. The name "Green Gallery" was both an homage to Richard Bellamy's Chelsea gallery in the 1960s and an ironic reference to the attic's sky blue color. The name intended to investigate the disconnect between expectation and experience, immediately generating an environment that invited questioning and dialogue. Such dialogue was motivation for Riepenhoff, who was also looking to fill a gap in the representation of emerging artists. Riepenhoff then moved the gallery to a larger industrial space in Riverwest two years later.

=== The Green Gallery West ===
In July 2012, The Green Gallery West was closed after a five-alarm fire broke out in the building. Much of the artwork stored at the space was damaged or destroyed and many artists living or working in other parts of the building lost significant amounts of their artwork as well.

=== The Green Gallery East ===
In January 2009, with business partner Jake Palmert, a second gallery space was opened on Milwaukee's East Side, called The Green Gallery East (the original gallery was then called The Green Gallery West). The primary goal of East was to create an easily accessible space to showcase contemporary artists from within the Midwest and bring nationally and internationally recognized artists into Milwaukee.

== Exhibiting artists ==
Artists who have shown at one or both of The Green Gallery spaces include

- David Robbins
- Michelle Grabner
- Chris Smith
- Scott Reeder
- Mark Borchardt
- Paul Druecke
- Andrew Swant
- Bobby Ciraldo
- Gavin Brown
- Ray Johnson
- Matthew Higgs
- Forrest Myers
- Evan Gruzis
- Jennifer Bolande
- Emily Sundblad
- Gaylen Gerber
- Margaret Lee
- Paul Cowan
- American Fantasy Classics with Bjorn Copeland
- Charles Andresen
- Kristin Calabrese
- Tobias Madison
- Antonio Da Veiga Rocha
- Tony Matelli
- Santiago Cucullu
- Nicholas Frank
- Tyson Reeder
- Peter Barrickman
- Dan Ollman
- Xavier Leplae
- Spencer Sweeney
- Kaspar Müller
- Amy Granat
- Amy Yao
- Anicka Yi
- Richard Galling
- Michael Williams
- Sara Clendening
- Nick Lowe
- José Lerma
- Drew Heitzler
- United Brothers
- Paul Slocum
- Eric Wesley
- Marco Kane Braunschweiler
- Martine Syms
- Lisa Jo
- Mae Fatto
- Aaron Garber-Maikovska
- Ian Hokin
- inmates from the Cook County Jail
- Anne Eastman
- Steven Pippin
- Tom Bamberger
- Nolan Simon
- Dan Torop
- Kim Miller
- Whitney Claflin
- Dave Miko
- Kerstin Brätsch
- Debo Eilers
- Jessica Jackson Hutchins
- Wayne Ngan
and many others.

== Art fairs ==
The Green Gallery has participated in numerous art fairs from both Milwaukee International Art Fairs and Dark Fairs (the first at the Swiss Institute, New York and the second at Kolnischer Kunstverein in Cologne, Germany) as well as the New Art Dealers Alliance Art Fair Miami Beach. Additionally, the Green Gallery has represented at Sunday Art Fair, London, Material in Mexico City and Paramount Ranch, LA.

== External projects ==
John Riepenhoff was one of the co-founders of the Milwaukee International and Dark Fairs.

The Green Gallery has done collaborative projects with Angstrom Gallery with David Quadrini in Los Angeles and 47 Canal Street Gallery in New York City.

The gallery sporadically hosts film and video screenings and features bands, readings, and performance art. What What (In the Butt), a video which went on to become an online viral success, premiered at The Green Gallery. Club Nutz, billed as the "World's Smallest Comedy Club", was originally housed within The Green Gallery West.

=== The Green Gallery Press ===
The gallery also houses the publishing company the Green Gallery Press, which publishes books and pamphlets by and about artists, often related to shows in the space. The Press is run by editor Joe Riepenhoff, and has published books on behalf of Michelle Grabner, Nicholas Frank, Stephen Wetzel, Paul Druecke, Scott Reeder, Ken Kagami, Renato Umali, Patty Yumi Cottrell, Dorota Biezel Nelson, Sara Fowler, Sarah Luther, and Mark Borchardt. The Green Gallery Press is responsible for a broad range of media, ranging from prose, essays, drawings, non-fiction and a variety of other supplementary works. Materials are available for purchase through the Gallery.
