= Hamlet A.D.D. =

- Directed by: Bobby Ciraldo; Andrew Swant
- Written by: Andrew Swant
- Produced by: Bobby Ciraldo
- Starring: Bobby Ciraldo; Andrew Swant; Mark Metcalf; Majel Barrett; Dustin Diamond; Kevin Murphy; Trace Beaulieu; Neil Hamburger; Mark Borchardt; Kumar Pallana; Robert Richard Jorge; Leslie Hall; Tay Zonday; Samwell; David Robbins
- Release date: April 10, 2014 (Los Angeles Museum of Contemporary Art)
- Running time: 100 minutes
- Country: United States
- Language: English

Hamlet A.D.D. is a 2014 American independent film and web series directed by Bobby Ciraldo and Andrew Swant and produced by Special Entertainment. It re-imagines William Shakespeare's Hamlet as a bizarre and comical tour through the ages. The world premiere was held at the Los Angeles Museum of Contemporary Art (MOCA LA) in April 2014.

This version of Hamlet is a comedy shot entirely in front of a green screen and features live-action characters in an animated world. The story begins in 1602 and leaps chronologically through time to the present, then into the distant future.

Guest stars include Dustin Diamond (Saved by the Bell), Mark Metcalf (Animal House), Majel Barrett Roddenberry (Star Trek), Trace Beaulieu & Kevin Murphy (Mystery Science Theater 3000), Mark Borchardt & Mike Schank, in his final film role to come out in his lifetime, (American Movie), Kumar Pallana (Rushmore) in his final film role, Leslie Hall (Yo Gabba Gabba!), Samwell ("What What"), Tay Zonday (Chocolate Rain), Michael Q. Schmidt (Tim & Eric Awesome Show), and comic Gregg Turkington as his character Neil Hamburger (Tim & Eric Awesome Show).

Scenes from the film have been shown at White Columns gallery (New York City), the Green Gallery (Milwaukee), the Frederick Layton Gallery (MIAD), INOVA gallery (UW-Milwaukee), and appeared as a special feature on the Mystery Science Theater 3000 XV box set. The film was supported by the Mary L. Nohl Fellowship for Artists.

== Plot ==
Hamlet is an easily distracted prince who is not quite ready to do the task at hand. Challenged to kill his uncle Claudius by the ghost of his recently dead father, Hamlet enthusiastically proceeds to do everything but. From practicing stage acting in the 1800s to producing a television drama in the 1950s, from dancing at the discothèque in the 1970s to culinary prankery in the distant future, Hamlet always manages to find something to distract himself from taking revenge for his father's murder.

== Cast ==
- Bobby Ciraldo as Hamlet
- Robert Richard Jorge as Claudius
- Andrew Swant as Horatio
- Xav Leplae as Polonius
- Harmony Murphy as Ophelia
- Dustin Diamond as Bernardo
- Mark Metcalf as Speedy McSpitty
- Majel Barrett Roddenberry as Queen Robot (voice)
- Trace Beaulieu as Evil Robot (voice)
- Kevin Murphy as King Robot (voice)
- Mark Borchardt as Gravedigger
- Mike Schank as Gravedigger's Friend
- Kumar Pallana as Kumar
- Neil Hamburger as Osric
- Michael Q. Schmidt as Officer Norton
- Samwell as Communications Officer
- Tay Zonday as Laertes (voice)
- Leslie Hall as Zombie Killer
- Laura Klein as Gertrude
- David Robbins as Norwegian Captain
- Jerod Duris as Laertes
- Eric Ziegeweid as Rosenstern
- Eric Gerber as Fortinbras
- Sarah Price as Triplet Judges
- Scott Reeder as Don London
- Drew Rosas as Daniel / Nathaniel
