= Special Entertainment =

American media production company

Special Entertainment (formerly Fortress Productions) is a Milwaukee based media production company established in 2003 by Bobby Ciraldo and Andrew Swant.

In 2014 Special Entertainment released Hamlet A.D.D., a partially animated science fiction comedy based on Shakespeare's classic text. The film premiered at the Los Angeles Museum of Contemporary Art after a sneak peek was featured on a Mystery Science Theater 3000 box set.

In 2013 Special Entertainment released the On Cinema Film Guide app, based on the On Cinema series which airs on Adult Swim. The comedic app features Tim Heidecker and Gregg Turkington reviewing over 17,000 films.

In February 2012 the duo projected iconic images from the What What (In the Butt) video onto well-known buildings in Los Angeles to celebrate the five-year anniversary of the project. Documentation of the project was exhibited at Machine Project gallery in Los Angeles.

In September 2010 Special Entertainment premiered The Found Footage Show which aired on The Onion's The A.V. Club website. The series, hosted by Found Footage Festival creators Joe Pickett & Nick Prueher, showcased humorous found footage clips and ran for 36 episodes.

In 2009 they released William Shatner's Gonzo Ballet, an award-winning documentary starring and executive produced by William Shatner. The film played in multiple film festivals and was distributed by Epix (Paramount Pictures/Lionsgate/MGM). That year they also released Frankie Latina's Modus Operandi, an arthouse film distributed by Kino. The film played at the American Film Institute film festival in Los Angeles, CineVegas film festival, and the IFC Center in New York.

In March 2009 Special Entertainment released an iPhone App called Shaky Advice from Samwell that functions much like a Magic 8 Ball with 31 video clips of What What (In the Butt)'s Samwell giving advice. In December 2010 a second iPhone App was released called Shaky Advice from Neil Hamburger, which featured 30 video clips of stand-up comic Neil Hamburger giving comical advice.

Something Theater, a half-hour broadcast television series which ran during infomercial timeslots, was produced with artist David Robbins. The series began in 2008 and aired sporadically.

In February 2008 Special Entertainment released a music video for the band Leslie and the Ly's called "Zombie Killer" featuring Elvira, Mistress of the Dark on guest vocals.

Past award-winning works include Studying the Lie, Table Talk, and work on David Robbins' The Ice Cream Social (winner of the Sundance TV Lab competition).

Brownmark Films was created by Special Entertainment productions in 2007.
