= Drew Heitzler =

American artist

Drew Heitzler (born 1972) is an American artist best known for his film and video work. Heitzler lives and works in Venice, California.

== Early life and work ==
Heitzler was born in Charleston, South Carolina. He received his BA from Fordham University in New York City in 1993. Heitzler studied at the Slade School in London before receiving an MFA in studio art from Hunter College in New York in 2000. In 2002, he was an artist-in-residence at the Skowhegan School of Painting and Sculpture in Madison, Maine. Heitzler lived and worked in the Williamsburg section of Brooklyn before relocating to Los Angeles in 2004. Heitzler's first film, Subway Sessions, was screened at Anthology Film Archives in 2002. His film TSOYW, made in collaboration with Amy Granat and Olivier Mosset was included in the 2008 Whitney Biennial. Additionally, his work was included in the 2010 California Biennial at the Orange County Museum of Art and has been included in exhibitions and screenings at MoMA PS1, SculptureCenter, LA><ART, Museum of Contemporary Art, Los Angeles, The Hammer Museum, Institute of Contemporary Arts in London, Kunsthalle Zurich, Zachęta National Gallery of Art in Warsaw, Kunstmuseum St. Gallen, Swiss Institute Contemporary Art New York and Centre Georges Pompidou. In 2008 Heitzler's video Sailors, Mermaids, Mystics was included in the New York Underground Film Festival. Heitzler is represented by Marlborough Chelsea in New York and Blum & Poe in Los Angeles.

== Champion Fine Art ==
In 2003, Heitzler opened Champion Fine Art with Flora Wiegmann. The artist-run gallery followed a strict criteria by which each exhibition was curated by an artist Heitzler and Wiegmann selected. The gallery published a zine-style catalog for each exhibition in edition of 100, distributed for free to gallery visitors. Each exhibition was titled with a number starting with #21. The shows descended numerically to #1, after which the gallery shut its doors. In this way, the gallery's ultimate demise was built into its programming. The gallery was located in Williamsburg, Brooklyn until August, 2004 when it relocated to the Culver City section of Los Angeles. Artists who curated or appeared in exhibitions at Champion Fine Art included Sylvie Fleury, Vincent Szarek, Bjorn Copeland, Carol Bove, Allyson Vieira, Alex Kwartler, Steven Parrino, Lizzi Bougatsos, Mai-Thu Perret, Josh Smith, Seth Price, Kelley Walker, Emily Sundblad, Monique Van Genderen, Valentin Carron, Gardar Eide Einarsson, Huma Bhabha, Nancy Shaver, Aleksandra Mir, Roe Ethridge, Fia Backström, Jessica Jackson Hutchins, Matt Johnson, Hannah Greely, Kalup Linzy, Shana Lutker, Stephen Rhodes, Jonas Wood, Shio Kusaka, Nate Lowman, Tony Matelli, Bert Rodriguez, Mary Weatherford, Charles Irvin, Ellen Altfest, Tyson Reeder, Scott Reeder, Katherine Bernhardt, Brian Bress, Alix Lambert, John Armleder, Cyprien Gaillard, Jan Groover, Jordan Wolfson, John Tremblay, Rose Kallal, Jonah Freeman, Chuck Nanney, Adam McEwen, Peter Coffin, Craig Kalpakjian, Stephen Shore, Joe Scanlan, James Welling, Eric Wesley, Carey Young, Walead Beshty, Anna Sew Hoy, Carter Mull and Adam Putnam.

While the gallery resided in New York, each exhibition closed with a performance by Wiegmann and Fellicia Ballos under the name Champion Dance.

== Mandrake ==
In 2005 Heitzler, along with Wiegmann and Justin Beal, opened Mandrake, a bar and cocktail lounge situated in the middle of the La Cienega Boulevard gallery district in Los Angeles. The back room at Mandrake, originally intended for use as a gallery space, opened with an exhibition curated by Darren Bader and Jesse Willenbring. Artists who had solo exhibitions at Mandrake include Richard Aldrich, Ann Craven, Mark Hagen, Gil Blank, and Mark Verbioff. As the bar rose in popularity it became impossible to guarantee the safety of the artworks and the exhibitions were discontinued. The backroom at Mandrake now houses two permanent murals by David Muller and Olivier Mosset. The bar also houses art works by Raymond Pettibon, Allen Ruppersberg, Andrea Büttner, Garth Weiser, Aleksandra Mir, Cyprien Gaillard, and Nate Lowman.
