= Bobby Ciraldo =

American film producer

Bobby Ciraldo (born 12 October 1974 in Skokie, Illinois) is a filmmaker and web-based artist whose works include Hamlet A.D.D., William Shatner's Gonzo Ballet, the production of Frankie Latina's Modus Operandi, Samwell's What What (In the Butt), and a music video for Leslie and the Ly's called "Zombie Killer" (featuring Elvira). He attended Grinnell College and later collaborated with Chris Smith, Ray Chi, and Scott Reeder to create ZeroTV.com, a precursor to MySpace and YouTube.

His Milwaukee-based production company Special Entertainment is co-owned by collaborator Andrew Swant. Ciraldo's films have won first prize at Milwaukee's 24-hour Film Festival in 2005 and 2007, and he has exhibited work at New York's White Columns gallery. According to the Internet Movie Database, he has worked as a computer programmer and holds two patents (one in the U.S. and one in Europe). Ciraldo co-created a broadcast television show with Andrew Swant and David Robbins called Something Theater, which has been airing since early 2009.
