= Andrew Swant =

American filmmaker (born 1976)

- Born: 1976 (age 49–50); Madison, Wisconsin, U.S.
- Education: University of Wisconsin–Milwaukee; University of Wisconsin–Eau Claire
- Occupation: Filmmaker

Andrew Swant (born 1976) is an American filmmaker best known for William Shatner's Gonzo Ballet, The Jeffrey Dahmer Files, and What What in the Butt.

== Career ==
In 2012, Swant co-wrote and starred in The Jeffrey Dahmer Files, a feature film about serial killer Jeffrey Dahmer which premiered at the SXSW film festival. It received positive reviews and was a New York Times Critic's Pick. Swant's portrayal of Dahmer was called "chillingly effective" by The Hollywood Reporter and "dead-on creepy perfection" by Entertainment Weekly. The film was picked up by IFC Films and released in early 2013.

In 2007, Swant and collaborator Bobby Ciraldo created the YouTube video What What (In the Butt), which immediately went viral. As of March 2020 their YouTube channel had over 82 million views. In 2009 the duo co-directed William Shatner's Gonzo Ballet, a documentary starring William Shatner, Ben Folds, and Henry Rollins. Later that year they released Frankie Latina's Modus Operandi, an arthouse film which screened at the American Film Institute Film Festival in Los Angeles and stars Danny Trejo. In 2014 they premiered a feature-length comedy called Hamlet A.D.D. at the Los Angeles Museum of Contemporary Art. The partially animated film is based on Shakespeare's Hamlet and guest stars Majel Barrett Roddenberry, Dustin Diamond, and Gregg Turkington as Neil Hamburger. Swant co-created a broadcast television show with Bobby Ciraldo and David Robbins called Something Theater, which aired sporadically from 2009 through 2011.

In 2017, he directed Silently Steal Away, a documentary about an obscure radio personality named Jack Raymond and the small radio station, WCFW, which has been playing his show for over 50 years. The film, which screened at Hot Docs International Documentary Festival (Toronto) and Eaux Claires Festival of Music & Art, stars musician Justin Vernon of Bon Iver and features narration by Mark Borchardt of American Movie. He also produced The Dundee Project, a documentary directed by Mark Borchardt which premiered at Slamdance in Park City, Utah and later screened at Fantastic Fest in Austin, Texas.

In 2019, he directed Bon Iver: Autumn, a short documentary about the creation of Bon Iver's 2019/2020 world tour. He also co-produced Give Me Liberty, which screened at the Sundance Film Festival, the Cannes Film Festival, and the Museum of Modern Art (New York). The film won the 2020 John Cassavetes Spirit Award and ranked #11 on The New York Times’s "Best Movies of 2019" list.

He attended film school at University of Wisconsin–Milwaukee, and art school at University of Wisconsin–Eau Claire where he majored in Fine Art and minored in Women's Studies.

Swant and Ciraldo (as the collaborative Special Entertainment) were awarded the Mary L. Nohl Fellowship for Established Artists in 2013. Other awards include the Best Documentary award at the Marbella International Film Festival, first place at Milwaukee's 24-hour Film Festival in 2005 and 2007, a Brico Award in 2019, and he was a Sundance TV Lab finalist in 2003.

== Filmography ==
Year	Title	Role	Notes
2019	Give Me Liberty	Co-Producer	Sundance, Cannes, John Cassavetes Spirit Award
2019	Bon Iver: Autumn	Director	
2017	Silently Steal Away	Director	Hot Docs Film Festival
2014	Hamlet A.D.D.	Director, Writer, Producer	Los Angeles Museum of Contemporary Art
2012	The Jeffrey Dahmer Files	Actor, Writer	SXSW, Hot Docs, BFI
2010	The Found Footage Show	Director, Producer	The A.V. Club
2009	William Shatner's Gonzo Ballet	Co-Director	Winner, Best Feature, Marbella Film Festival
2009	Modus Operandi	Writer, Producer, Actor	AFI Fest
2009	Something Theater	Director, Writer, Producer	
2007	What What (In the Butt)	Director, Writer, Producer	Featured on South Park
