= William Shatner's Gonzo Ballet =

- Directed by: Pat Buckley; Bobby Ciraldo (co-director); Kevin Layne (co-director); Andrew Swant (co-director)
- Produced by: Chris Carley; David Zappone; Michael Manasseri
- Starring: William Shatner; Ben Folds; Margo Sappington; Henry Rollins; Elizabeth Shatner; Michael Pink
- Cinematography: Mark Escribano
- Edited by: Ray Chi
- Music by: Ben Folds
- Distributed by: EPIX
- Release date: April 17, 2009 (Nashville Film Festival)
- Running time: 60 minutes
- Country: United States
- Language: English

William Shatner's Gonzo Ballet is a 2009 American documentary film about a ballet by Margo Sappington called "Common People", which was set to the music of William Shatner and Ben Folds from their album Has Been. "Common People" was one of the Has Been tracks, and was a cover of a Pulp song from their 1995 Different Class album.

The film explores the genesis of this unique artistic collaboration by fusing the music, poetry, and dance of "Common People" with interviews by William Shatner, Ben Folds, Margo Sappington, and Henry Rollins. Shatner plays a prominent role in the film and also acted as Executive Producer.

The film was made by Special Entertainment and Big Screen Entertainment Group in association with Shatner's Melis Productions.

The documentary had a very well received World Premiere at the Nashville Film Festival in April 2009, where it won the President's Impact Award. William Shatner attended and, to the delight of the audience, provided additional insights into his recording of "Has Been" and the ballet. Ben Folds and Margo Sappington were also in attendance. Variety magazine called the film "surprisingly revealing" and indieWire reviewed that "Shatner comes across as a true original."

After the premiere in Nashville the film screened at the Rhode Island Film Festival, DocFest Stratford, the Milwaukee Film Festival, the Wild Rivers Film Festival, the Edmonton International Film Festival, the Indie Memphis Film Festival, and the San Diego Film Festival.

In October 2009 the film screened at the Marbella International Film Festival in Spain, where it won the Best Documentary award. William Shatner attended the festival and accepted the award. The film also won a Telly Award in 2012.

In 2013, as an April Fool's Day prank, Netflix created a new genre called "Surreal Ballets Based on a William Shatner Album" and listed the film 50 times in each user's account.

The world television premiere was a multi-platform release through EPIX, a joint venture between Paramount Pictures, MGM, and Lionsgate. The film was available on Netflix from 2011 through 2015 and was later released on Sundance Now, Amazon Prime Video, iTunes, and others. In October 2020 it was released on Blu-ray by Shout Factory.
