= Federation Trading Post =

Star Trek and science fiction

Federation Trading Post was an American Star Trek and science fiction specialty retail store with two locations, one in Berkeley, California (opened May 11, 1975) and a second in New York City (opened October 11, 1975). Both stores were founded and owned by self-described Trekkers Chuck Weiss and Sandy Sarris.

Described as the "first of its kind", and very likely the first independent retail store solely devoted to a television series, the Federation Trading Post was seen as contributing to the rise of Star Trek fan culture in the Bay Area and in New York City in the years between the cancellation of the original series in 1969, and the release of Star Trek: The Motion Picture in 1979. During this time, the show had entered syndication and gained new fans, many of whom took to letter-writing campaigns to bring the show back on the air. Official merchandise for the growing fan base had been sparse, so many unlicensed fan creations were shared and/or sold at early science fiction conventions.

== The "Red Hour" Festival ==
Star Trek-specific fan club events had begun before the show's cancellation in 1969, although guests were not included in any organized convention setting until January 1972. Star Trek Lives! details the first series of Star Trek conventions, growing steadily in New York, as well as a nationwide campaign by fans to see a series revival.

Weiss, Sarris and other San Francisco fans of the series would meet to watch reruns and exchange trivia. Their organization efforts led to The "Red Hour" Festival (referencing the episode "The Return of the Archons"), the first Star Trek convention held in Northern California.

The twelve-hour event was held at Abraham Lincoln High School in San Francisco on February 22, 1975, and served as a fundraising effort for the local fan club, Star Trek Archives. Actors James Doohan, George Takei, Walter Koenig and Arlene Martel appeared, along with others. Reportedly, 1,000 fans were turned away for lack of space. The event garnered attention in the local press, including a mention by Herb Caen in his column in the San Francisco Chronicle, and its success helped convince Weiss and Sarris to open the Federation Trading Post.

== Federation Trading Post (West) ==
The Federation Trading Post opened on May 11, 1975, at 2556 Telegraph Avenue in Berkeley, California, selling toys and memorabilia of the original Star Trek television series. 1,500 people lined up the small store on its opening day, with a line down Telegraph Avenue. Within days of the Berkeley store opening, local news reported that the Federation Trading Post was receiving hundreds of letters of mail a day, many inquiring about a potential catalog. Eight months later, People Magazine's first national edition (it had previously been a West Coast publication) included an article about The Federation Trading Post.

The store acted primarily as a meeting place for like-minded fans, without pressure to purchase. To add to the atmosphere, audio recordings of episode music and sound effects would play continuously on an 8-track loop. Weiss described the Federation Trading Post as a place where fans "can come and let their hair down and be among friends".

=== Mail Order Catalog ===
Almost all of the items sold at the Federation Trading Post were featured in a mail order catalog that shipped to all fifty states, and seven foreign countries. The store and its catalog boasted over three hundred items, including tribbles, realistic replica phasers, Vulcan ear appliances made by professional make-up artist Doug Jones, posters, records, photos of the cast, model kits, key chains, buttons, bumper stickers, blueprints of the Starship Enterprise, games, t-shirts, iron-on patches, Starfleet uniforms for men and women, uniform insignia, and Spock-shaped candy. Most of the items were fan-produced, as licensed merchandise was sparsely available at the time. The store also stocked a variety of Fanzines, which were themselves instrumental in building fan-based communities, long before online social media.

=== Arcade Cabinet ===
In 1977, computer engineer Dave Needle, Bob Ewell and software designer Stan Shepherd were interested in creating a Star Trek video game arcade cabinet, and approached Chuck Weiss at the Federation Trading Post about placing it in the store. This had not been the first attempt or offer, but after four months the team had finished the game, using two Intel 8080 8-bit microprocessors.

"The game had an Enterprise ship and a Klingon ship. They each had shields around them with 16 shield segments. The shields took individual hits and glowed when they got hit, which was a pretty good accomplishment in those days, and then dimmed down to a lower level of brightness. A couple of hits on a shield would make it die and then a direct hit through the shields to your ship would cause some damage. You could rotate your ship so that the incoming weapon would hit a shield instead of your ship. It was 2-player or one player against the computer. You had 99 photon torpedoes and some amount of phaser energy. In those days that was top-notch stuff. Plus we had a cloaked Romulan ship that would show up when he felt like it and shoot a fireball at you. You could damage the Romulan ship if you hit it while it was visible".

— Dave Needle

When the game was over The Doomsday Machine, from the episode of the same name, would appear and eat the ship of the losing player.

== Federation Trading Post (East) ==
In October 1975, The Federation Trading Post East opened in Manhattan at 210 East 53rd Street. The store duplicated the one in Berkeley, with the addition of a Star Trek Museum, featuring realistic looking fan-produced reproductions of Star Trek models and props.

Isaac Asimov and his wife, Janet Jeppson (famously a Star Trek fan), attended the opening night party.

Ron Barlow and Doug Drexler (who would later move to Hollywood and win two Emmys and an Academy Award for his work on Dick Tracy), managed the New York location. Just as in Berkeley, the New York City store was an instant hit its first year, with a line of people often waiting to get in. The local fans were so enthused that they raised funds to air a 30-second TV commercial for the store during syndicated Star Trek reruns.

The success of the Federation Trading Post inspired imitators on both coasts, including the Intergalactic Trading Company in New York City, and the Interstellar Trading Post in San Diego, California.

=== Star Trek Museum ===
The New York location designated a room as the "World's First Star Trek Museum", customized with Matt Jefferies-inspired doorway arches and painted backdrops with lights and electronics to resemble the Starship Enterprise. Displayed in the museum were authentic props and uniforms from the collection of Alan Asherman, author of the Star Trek Compendium. The museum also hosted a six-foot model of a Klingon Battlecruiser crafted by two fans, along with other replicas of ships and weapons.

== Sued by Paramount Studios ==
After the Federation Trading Post opened in New York City, the store was sued by Gulf and Western, parent company of Paramount Studios at the time, alleging infringement of their common law trademark, "Star Trek". The owners were able to acquire representation by the prestigious San Francisco law firm of Philips, Moore, Weissenberger, Lempio & Majestic. Eventually the suit was settled out of court without admission of wrongdoing by the defendants, and the store was given a sales and manufacturing license, which allowed it to continue conducting business as before.

== Effect of Star Wars ==
The unprecedented success of Star Wars in 1977 suddenly brought science fiction into the mainstream. Whereas before, toys and memorabilia from science fiction movies and TV shows were hard to find, after the release of Star Wars the Federation Trading Post was soon competing with the larger, nationwide retail outlets. To keep up, the store's inventory expanded to include not only Star Wars merchandise, but also futuristic items such as 3D holographic pendants. An enlarged “21st Century” edition of the mail order catalog was created to include the store's new offerings.

== Guest appearances ==
Most of the original cast signed autographs at the Federation Trading Post. William Shatner (Capt. James Kirk) promoted his new album "William Shatner Live" at the Berkeley store, signing his name to every copy sold that day. James Doohan (Chief Engineer, Montgomery Scott), George Takei (Helmsman, Hikaru Sulu), Nichelle Nichols (Communications Officer, Nyota Uhura), Grace Lee Whitney (Yeoman Janice Rand), Bruce Hyde (Transporter Technician, Kevin Riley), and guest star Arlene Martel (Spock's fiancée, T’Pring), along with Franz Joseph Schnaubelt (creator of the Enterprise Blueprints and author of the "Starfleet Technical Manual") also made appearances in Berkeley. David Prowse (Darth Vader of Star Wars) later appeared at the Berkeley location.

At the New York store, Nichelle Nichols signed autographs. Leonard Nimoy appeared in costume while touring with the Royal Shakespeare Company in the title role of "Sherlock Holmes". Other notable visitors included comics legend Stan Lee, and Stephen E. Whitfield, author of "The Making of Star Trek", and Star Trek creator Gene Roddenberry himself.

Federation Trading Post was mentioned in Robert Anton Wilson's "Cosmic Trigger", and "Neuropolitics" by Timothy Leary, Robert Anton Wilson, George A. Koopman.

In 1976, the store advertised in some of the earliest Starlog magazine issues, and contributed a newsletter to TV Sci-Fi Monthly.

The Berkeley location, as well as The "Red Hour" Festival before it, were vocally supported in their early days by Bob Wilkins, host of Creature Features on KTVU in the San Francisco Bay Area.

== Reunion ==
In May 2018, the owners and two of the original staff, David Bellard (stock boy) and Rita Fattaruso (cashier), held a reunion event in the original retail space, after hearing that the building would soon be torn down. The event featured photos of the original store, screening of episodes, costume contest, refreshments, and a sales room for collectables.

== See also ==
- Star Trek Convention
- Star Trek Lives!
- Trekkers
