= Sergey Skobun =

Serhiy Sergiovich Skobun (Ukrainian: Сергій Сергійович Скобун; born 4 March 1973) is a Ukrainian film director.

For the first time, he tried his hand in cinema on the Canary Islands, where he worked on creating the entertainment-psychological show “Status Quo.”

In 2015, he began filming the historical movie The Legend of the Carpathians, starring Valeriy Kharchyshyn and Maria Yaremchuk.

He also directed the music video for the song While I Haven’t Left by the band Druha Rika, which became the soundtrack for The Legend of the Carpathians.

In 2018, he was invited to serve on the jury of the international film festival “Brukivka.”

In 2020, he received the “Heroes of Today” award from the Ukrainian TV channel Ukraine.

At the beginning of 2022, he directed the short film Yellow Star: A Story of Two Families, Jewish and Ukrainian, During World War II, Film Yellow Star received numerous international film awards.

He is also the organizer of the international film festival “Bukovina” and Canaries international film festival on Canary Island, Spain.

In 2024, participated in the film Under the Volcano by Damian Kochur. The film was presented at the Toronto International Film Festival and was selected as Poland’s nominee for the 97th Academy Awards.

In 2025, Serhiy Skobun launched the production of the feature film “Island.” The filming takes place in the Canary Islands (Spain) with the participation of an international cast.

The cast includes: • Kevin McNally — British actor known for his role as Joshamee Gibbs in the Pirates of the Caribbean franchise;

• Bohdan Benyuk — Ukrainian film and theater actor, People’s Artist of Ukraine;

• as well as other British, Spanish, American, and Ukrainian performers.

The project is positioned as a crime drama with thriller elements. According to the plot, the main character named Bold finds himself at the center of a conflict involving organized crime, technological control, and a personal search for truth.

The film is being shot in three languages — English, Ukrainian, and Spanish. The premiere is planned for 2026.

List of awards and nominations 

| Award | Ceremony date | Category | Nominee(s) | Result | Source |
|---|---|---|---|---|---|
| Coronation of the word | 2016 | Odesa International Film Festival Special Award | Legends of Carpathians | Won | |
| Marbella International Film Festival | 2017 | Best feature film | Legends of Carpathians | Nominated | |
| Marbella International Film Festival | 2019 | Best short film | Angel | Won | |

== Gratitudes ==
| Gratitude | Date | Source |
|---|---|---|
| Gratitude from the leadership of SSU in Chernivtsi region for a significant contribution to the revival of national spirituality and the preservation of the historical heritage of the Ukrainian people | 2018 | |
| Gratitude from the Association of Ukrainians in Great Britain | 2018 | |
| Gratitude from the Ukrainian Institute of America in New York | 2018 | |
| Gratitude from the Association of Ukrainians in the Canary Islands 2018 | 2018 | |
| Gratitude from the Ukrainian Canadian Congress | 2018 | |
| Gratitude from Embassy of Ukraine to the United Kingdom of Great Britain and Northern Ireland | 2018 | |
| Acknowledgments from the chairman of the Committee on Culture and Spirituality of the Verkhovna Rada of Ukraine Mykola Knyazhitsky for a significant contribution to the development of culture and art. | 2018 | |
| Heroes Today Award from Ukraine TV Channel for contribution to the development of the hometown. | 2020 | |
