= Chocolate Rain =

Song by Tay Zonday

Single by Tay Zonday
- Released: April 23, 2007
- Recorded: March 2007
- Studio: Tay Zonday's apartment, Minneapolis, Minnesota, U.S.
- Genre: Art pop
- Length: 4:52
- Label: Self-released
- Songwriter: Tay Zonday
- Producer: Tay Zonday

Music video
- "Chocolate Rain" on YouTube

"Chocolate Rain" is a song by American singer Tay Zonday. It quickly became popular after the music video for the song was uploaded to YouTube on April 23, 2007, and has since been viewed more than 143 million times as of November 2026. "Chocolate Rain" was ranked as the hottest viral video of summer 2007 by CTV and was awarded the 2008 YouTube Award in the category "Music". Lyrically, the song is a metaphor for racism against African Americans.

== Music video ==
The official music video for "Chocolate Rain," lasting 4 minutes and 52 seconds, was uploaded on April 23, 2007, to Tay Zonday's official YouTube channel. The video portrays Zonday in a recording studio wearing a white T-shirt and singing into a condenser microphone. The song is about racism and is referenced in its lyrics. Occasional cuts to Zonday playing a digital piano are also shown. From time to time, Zonday moves away from the microphone in between lines; an explanation is provided via a caption that appears early in the video – "**I move away from the mic to breathe in".

The music video was ranked as the hottest viral video of summer 2007 by CTV. The video has garnered 142 million views as of June 2026.

== Critical reception ==
Garth Montgomery of The Daily Telegraph described the song as having a "hypnotic quality," with "curious vocals that sound like a man much older than the young artist," playing over a "cheesy" drum loop.

During a brief interview on The Opie and Anthony Show, Zonday called the song "cheesy" and commented how its lyrics dealt with racism.

The initial spread of the popularity of the song was due to 4chan. Zonday said, "I'm pretty sure the 'Chocolate Rain' attention started as a joke at 4chan.org, an internet forum that is credited with starting lots of popular internet phenomena. It spread to a general audience and people started uploading spoofs. I don't know what causes people to listen to my music. If I could speak it, there would be no reason to write songs."

== Performances ==
Clips of the video have been played or referenced on television and radio shows, including G4TV's Attack of the Show, Last Call with Carson Daly, The Daily Show with Jon Stewart, Maury and Online Nation. On August 9, 2007, Zonday performed the song on the late-night talk show Jimmy Kimmel Live! as part of its "Internet Talent Showcase". It has also been performed live on the BBC Radio 1 Chris Moyles Show. Later, Zonday came out on Lily Allen and Friends, where he sang in a live performance of Lily Allen's song "Smile". Zonday performed Chocolate Rain during the autism education benefit Night of Too Many Stars on October 2, 2010. During some 2007 and 2008 performances, LeRoi Moore, the saxophonist for the Dave Matthews Band, integrated the melody into an outro on the band's song "The Dreaming Tree". Zonday also got a "Web Redemption" on Daniel Tosh's show Tosh.0.

=== Spoofs and tributes ===
"Chocolate Rain" is the subject of numerous parodies, tributes, remixes, and covers on the Internet. Major musical artists such as John Mayer and Green Day drummer Tre Cool have spoofed the song on TV and YouTube.

Zonday himself appeared on the August 2007 episode of VH1's Best Week Ever and performed a parody called "Summer Break". In March 2008, Zonday performed the song during YouTube Live; during the same show, Bo Burnham (with his song "Welcome to YouTube") made a comical reference to the song, with the lyrics "Your favourite coat's got a doo-doo stain, I pray to God that's Chocolate Rain." Zonday was featured in the music video for rock band Weezer's song "Pork and Beans" and appeared in a YouTube video with Weezer's Brian Bell to play an acoustic version of "Pork and Beans" on June 3, 2008. Zonday himself appeared as a guest voice on an episode of Robot Chicken, where the song was spoofed as "Chocolate Grain". The song was part of the mashup "Like Tears In Chocolate Rain" from Neil Cicierega's Mouth Sounds.

On April 2, 2008, South Park aired "Canada on Strike", in which Zonday appears talking about "Chocolate Rain" (along with other Internet memes), only to be killed when a stare from the Dramatic Look Gopher makes his head explode. The title of the hit was humorously manipulated in the phrase "get ready for some chocolate pain" within the episode. The episode brought back the video's popularity and boosted its views by over one million in the days following its airing. In The Office episode "Business Ethics," Michael Scott confesses that when he discovered YouTube, he "watched Cookie Monster sings 'Chocolate Rain' about a thousand times". This prompted the creation of several such videos a few days later. While making a guest appearance on Jimmy Kimmel Live in April 2007, Paul Reubens debuted a spoof educational movie called Journey to Banana Land that beckoned "Chocolate Rain" when the narrator mentions cocoa trees; Zonday's YouTube video is used as Reubens sings along (Zonday himself performed the song on Kimmel in August 2007, to a mixed audience reception.) On 30 Rock, Liz called Toofer "Chocolate Rain" in "SeinfeldVision".

On July 28, 2017, the rock and roll jam band Phish paid tribute to the song by performing it as the opening number to their Baker's Dozen chocolate donut–themed concert at Madison Square Garden.

=== Commercials ===
In November 2007, Zonday licensed the song to and recorded spoof lyrics for Comedy Central as a promo clip for their show Last Laugh with Lewis Black. On November 28, 2007, Zonday released a spoof/sequel to the song titled "Cherry Chocolate Rain". The music video is professionally shot and makes many allusions to the original song. The song makes fun of itself with its over-the-top visuals and mentions how Zonday was "paid a hefty, hefty fee" to do the video, as well as featuring professional rapper Mista Johnson, who repeats, "He moves his mouth away from the mic so he can breathe." The video and song were created as part of a promotional campaign for Cherry Chocolate Diet Dr Pepper.

In October 2026, Zonday appeared in Mozilla's Come Back to Firefox advertising campaign, alongside several other viral internet personalities from the 2000s and 2010s. The campaign used nostalgia for early internet culture to promote Firefox.

== License ==
The song and video are licensed under a Creative Commons BY-NC-ND license. It has been suggested that the relative openness of the license has helped to encourage the song's spread. Creative Commons has praised Tay Zonday specifically for this very reason. Zonday expressed his own thoughts on the licensing situation on his Myspace blog, stating, "I want non-profit radio and small mom/pop cafes to be able to play my music for free. But I also want giant corporations who can afford to give me a dime or two to pay fair royalties."

== See also ==
- Internet meme
