= Charlie Bit My Finger =

2007 Internet viral video

Charlie bit my finger – again!
- Harry (left) and Charlie as seen in the video
- Starring: Harry Davies-Carr; Charlie Davies-Carr
- Release date: 22 May 2007
- Running time: 56 seconds
- Country: United Kingdom

"Charlie bit my finger – again!", more simply known as "Charlie Bit My Finger" or "Charlie Bit Me", is a 2007 viral video famous for being the most-viewed YouTube video from 2009 to 2012. The 56-second-long video, which was uploaded on YouTube on 22 May 2007 UTC, features Harry Davies-Carr (aged 3) and Charlie Davies-Carr (aged 1), two brothers from England. In the video, Charlie nibbles on Harry's finger. Harry reacts with amusement and offers his finger again, but cries in pain when Charlie bites down harder, though both brothers eventually end the interaction smiling and giggling.

In May 2021, the video was sold as an NFT at auction for over $700,000. The Charlie Bit Me "Official Remix" and "Working With Harry and Charlie" NFTs were auctioned off in May 2021. As of August 2026, the video has received over 889 million views.

== Background and upload ==
Even had I thought of trying to get them boys to do this I probably couldn't have, neither were coerced into any of this and neither were hurt (for very long anyway).

— Howard Davies-Carr, father of the boys

Howard Davies-Carr, the father of Harry Davies-Carr (aged 3) and Charlie Davies-Carr (aged 1), said the video was "simply an attempt to capture the boys growing up". While watching the finger-biting scene on his camera after recording it, it "didn't particularly stand out". It was not until he transferred the video onto his computer a few weeks later and played it again that he found it comedic. At the time, the Davies-Carr family lived in Marlow, Buckinghamshire, nearly 30 miles west of London. Howard uploaded the video onto YouTube so that it could be watched by the boys' grandfather, who was living in the United States. He chose YouTube because the size of the video file was so big that it could not be sent by email. Originally the video was set to private and he mentions, "I was just about to remove (the video) before it exploded. But once it had (exploded) I had lost control of the clip anyway so I left it."

Under the title "Charlie bit my finger – again!", the 56-second-long video, was uploaded on YouTube on 22 May 2007 UTC, featuring the two brothers Harry and Charlie, who were aged 3 and aged 1 at the time, respectively. Howard commented on the video: "The clip only went up as I wanted to share it with the boys' grandfather. I was naive about the whole YouTube thing. It became viral and once that happened there was nothing I could do. People have sent lovely comments and messages and I now upload a new video of the boys every six weeks."

== Views ==
"Charlie Bit My Finger" had received 2.6 million views on YouTube by the start of February 2008 and 12 million views by March 2008. In December 2008, it was the twelfth most viewed video on YouTube with 65 million views. By April 2009, the video had received 92 million views. It became the second most viewed video in August 2009, and took over the title as the most viewed video ever at the end of October 2009, when it surpassed "Evolution of Dance". By November 2009, "Charlie Bit My Finger – Again!" had received over 130 million views. In addition to being the most viewed, it was also the "most favourited" and the second "most discussed" video on the website in the United Kingdom. In a May 2009 report compiled by Visible Measures, which measures video views across 150 video-sharing websites, "Charlie Bit My Finger" was the thirteenth most viewed viral video on the Internet. As of December 2025, the video had reached 888 million views, with over 2.3 million likes.

== Legacy ==
As a result of the video's inadvertent fame, the boys gained recognition. Following the video, multiple clips were uploaded by their father to YouTube. They feature Jasper, the third child in the family. Shelley Davies-Carr, their mother, commented on the success: "Susan Boyle has never had the hits we have had. The video got on to a college networking site in the U.S. and from there it went viral. I think the British accents have helped make it so globally viewed." According to a 2008 interview with Shelley, the boys feel embarrassed when they see themselves on television. She also noted that in 2008 they were "shy about their new fame." Howard commented in 2009 that his sons "are now almost legendary. People want their autographs, it's just crazy."

In their list of YouTube's 50 greatest viral videos, Time ranked "Charlie Bit My Finger" as number one. The video's lasting impact was underscored by the Davies-Carr family's appearance as mystery guests on Channel 4's Big Fat Quiz of the '00s on 30 September 2012. Among the references to the video is "Todd Packer", an episode of the U.S. television series The Office, in which Holly Flax ranks "Charlie Bit My Finger" as one of the acmes of comedy. In a 2012 interview Howard Davies-Carr discussed the pitfalls of his sons' accidental fame, saying, "There are an awful lot of unscrupulous people out there who will try and take advantage of people that don't understand what they have." When it comes to the topic of the boys getting older, the boys' father has reflected, "When the boys get to 18, I'd like them to think back and think, 'O.K., I've got something in my life which is more than just what I was when I did the 'Charlie Bit Me' video." The parents have passed on invitations to talk shows and on making public appearances in media outlets.

In 2014, during his "After The Oscars Special" on Jimmy Kimmel Live!, Jimmy Kimmel enlisted the help of many big-name celebrities to showcase some of YouTube's greatest videos. The first video to be showcased was "Charlie Bit My Finger" and was parodied in a video entitled "Bitman Begins" and featured Tom Hanks, Meryl Streep, and brothers Chris & Liam Hemsworth. Chris played the role of Harry, while Liam played the role of Charlie. The video was a mock trailer for a film featuring the actors. The climactic scene takes place on the roof of a building where Harry wants revenge on Charlie for biting his finger. "Harry" screams the line "Charlie bit me, Charlie bit my finger!" They fall off the roof onto the street below. "Harry" then utters the famous line "Ouch Charlie, that really hurt" while "Charlie" just laughs. The Davies-Carr family now includes two additional sons, Jasper and Rupert. Osama bin Laden, the founder of Al-Qaeda, had the video in his computer's audio/visual collection. A sound clip from the video is featured in "Pulse 8", the first track of the 2015 album Integrity by grime MC Jme.

== Auction ==
In May 2021, the video was auctioned off as two NFTs: the Charlie Bit Me "Official Remix" and "Working With Harry and Charlie". The winner of the auction, with a top bid of $760,999, was 3F Music – a company which also owns NFTs corresponding to the Disaster Girl and Overly Attached Girlfriend internet memes. Following the auction, the buyer had decided that the video should remain on YouTube, however the video remained unavailable to the public until January 2024.

== Financial impact ==
In an April 2015 interview, Charlie said he thought it was "a bit odd that loads of people have watched it." Also, according to the interview, Charlie and Harry's parents have made "thousands" from the video through advertising and sponsorship. It was reported that in 2011 the family made over £100,000 in advertising revenue from the video. The profit from the video was enough that the family could afford to purchase a new house.

Their success has been compared to winning a lottery, a so-called "meme lottery". Since the "Charlie Bit My Finger" video was posted, other videos of babies have gone "viral" on YouTube and the families are monetising them, some making over US$100,000. In response to requests from viewers online, the family created "Charlie Bit My Finger" T-shirts, mugs and limited edition calendars. The family signed into a partnership with Viral Spiral, a viral meme video management company specialising in viral videos, which has helped place the viral video in meme advertisements for companies like Sprint and helped to create a viral meme brand. There was also news of a web series featuring the boys in the works. As of 2021, no information has been released since the initial announcement in 2012.

== See also ==
- David After Dentist
- Laughing Baby
- List of Internet phenomena
- Viral video

Achievements
Preceded by Evolution of Dance	Most Viewed Video on YouTube; Ranked 70th as of January 2017	Succeeded by Lady Gaga — Bad Romance
