= Trip Ross =

American writer, actor, and director

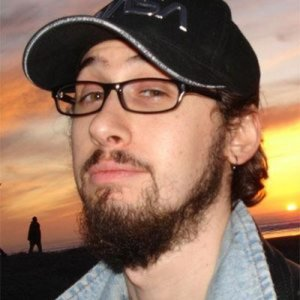
- Born: March 14, 1979 (age 46); Kansas

Trip Ross (born Andrew William Ross on March 14, 1979 in Salina, Kansas) is an American writer, actor, director and producer. He is most well known for creating the television show Empty Noggin, which began as an online comedic video enterprise before moving to television in the mid-2000s. He is the owner of Uncultivated Studios, and has directed a number of music videos for celebrities like Logan Lynn.

== About ==
Ross created Empty Noggin Entertainment in August 1998 and Uncultivated Studios in February 2003. He is currently the executive producer of the television show Empty Noggin, which has aired on CW, Fox and Comcast on Demand. Fellow writers of the show include Greg Nibler, Nate Gancher and Rob Campbell. Moving from largely an online presence to an actual television show in 2006, Empty Noggin aired concurrently on Comcast Local 37 and Comcast On-Demand. After one season, it moved to Portland's CW for half a season, before finishing the second season on Fox 49. It is no longer on the air.

In addition to his work with Empty Noggin, Ross owns Uncultivated Studios, a general digital media company specializing in music videos, parodies and odd commercials. Trip has helped several groups across the globe put their music to film. Some of these music videos, particularly those by artist Logan Lynn, have been played on MTV, VH1, Logo, ADD-TV and various local Portland, Oregon, programs.

He has also been a member of the comedy group Cinema Queso, which has made several award-winning short films.

== Filmography ==
Year	Title	Role	Notes
2007	Rainbow Brite: The True Saturday Morning Story	Inspector Gadget	Short comedy
2008	Twilight	Coffee Shop Guy (uncredited)	Movie
2009	"Messiah Complex"	Henchman 2	Comedy
2010	"Leverage"	Associate	TV series (1 episode: "The Bottle Job")

== Recognition ==
In December 2007, Trip's music video for Portland artist Logan Lynn, titled Burning Your Glory, was nominated for the MTV Logo network's music video of the year.

The nomination did lend itself to national exposure as the lead story on Out of the Closet Television in March 2008. Burning Your Glory was also nominated for best music video for ADD TV.
