= Scott Woolley =

American television producer (born 1960)

- Born: September 7, 1960 (age 66); New York City
- Occupations: Entrepreneur, film producer
- Years active: 1983–present
- Spouse: Tiffany Woolley
- Website: swoolleyentertainment.com

Scott Woolley (born September 7, 1960) is an American television producer. In 1991, after working and operating his grocery chain for twelve years, he founded Five Star Productions, a film and video production company. Through his company, Woolley has produced 23 television shows since 1992. In 2009, he was a producer for William Shatner's Gonzo Ballet.

== Early life and education ==
Woolley was born in Queens and grew up in Smithtown, Long Island. At the age of 10, Woolley started working in his family's grocery store chain, Foodtown (United States). When he was fifteen, his family moved to Oyster Bay Cove, New York, where he attended St. Dominic High School. Later, Woolley attended St. John's University.

== Career ==
In 1983, Woolley founded the grocery chain Woolley's Fine Foods with his father in Boca Raton, Florida. By 1991, Woolley's was a chain of 42 stores. In 2005, Woolley, supporting John Capra and John Paul DeJoria launched John Paul Pet, a company which produces grooming products for pets based on the John Paul Mitchell Systems brand. In 2009, Woolley sold his daily television series on the Lifetime Television Network, closing Five Star and launching a new Entertainment & Marketing company, The SW Group.

Woolley is also a founding member of the Founder's Club for FAU football.

=== Five Star Productions ===
Woolley started with video production while he was experimenting with ways to keep the customers at his family's grocery store entertained while they were waiting in line. He did this by mounting television sets on the ceiling and playing instructional and cooking shows on them. In 1992, he co-founded Five Star Productions USA Inc., a film and video production company. Woolley developed his first production, Flight, after noticing the large number of available aviation magazines and noting the variety of articles and advertisements about everything from airports to propellers. The show was telecast of SportChannel America for 13 episodes.

The production company started with three people working out of a small office in Boca Raton. By 1993, the company had grown and was employing 20 people, when Woolley formed a partnership with John Paul DeJoria, and subsequently the company grew even further. In 1993, the company produced Today`s Environment hosted by Ed Begley Jr., a show that profiled what businesses had done to protect the environment. The show was telecast on CNBC as well as the Discovery Channel. The company produced Business First in 1998. In the show, Jack Kemp interviewed corporate executives. Other shows produced by the company included Today's Health with Faith Daniels, Parenting and Beyond hosted by Kim Alexis, The Best of Wine and Food with George Hamilton, The Next Millenium with Peter Weller, Football Playbook, and Teen Scene. In 2003, Woolley created The Balancing Act, a 30-minute weekly series that aired on the Lifetime Television network hosted by Joanna Kerns.

Woolley helped develop a child safety program with the Palm Beach County Sheriff's Department called the Call-A-Cop. As part of the program, cards pairing deputies with athletes and celebrities were prepared. The card also listed statistics of the celebrity and the deputy as well as the phone number of the featured deputy. Woolley helped with the photo shoots as well as in designing the cards and gathering all the athletes and celebrities.

In 1998, Woolley expanded into radio by creating the nationally syndicated, weekly program Inside the NHL hosted by John Davidson and Jeff Rimer. Since 1992, twenty-three television series, and entertainment specials, films, corporate videos, and music specials have been produced and created under Woolley's direction by Five Star. Five Star is responsible for writing, producing, and directing its shows as well as obtaining sponsors. The company created a sister firm in February 2000 by investing in a digital-technology operation, allowing Five Star to do its own editing.

== Awards ==
In 1999, Woolley received the Ernst & Young Entrepreneur of the Year Award for Florida. Woolley and his productions have been the recipient of industry awards including three Emmys, ADDY Awards and Aurora Awards.

== Filmography ==
=== As a producer ===
Year	Title	Notes
1992	Flight	13 episodes
1992	Sporting Edge	10 episodes
1993	Today's Environment	126 episodes
1994	Parenting & Beyond	86 episodes
1995	Today's Health	102 episodes
1995	Gadgets Gizmos & More	4 episodes
1997	The Next Millennium	10 episodes
1997	The Best of Wine & Food	36 episodes
1998	Hi Tech Toys for the Holidays	12 episodes -
1998	Business First	13 episodes
1999	Football Playbook	13 episodes
2001	The Balancing Act	88 episodes
2002	Dive Today	13 episodes
2002	Deep Purple: Perihelion Live	Live Concert DVD / Special
2002	Dave Mason; Live at Sunrise: 2002	Live Concert DVD / Special
2002	Ronnie Milsap; Live: 2002	Live Concert DVD / Special
2003	Zo's Summer Groove	13 episodes
2004	Trade Show Today	2 episodes
2006	Yanni Live! The Concert Event	Live DVD
2008	Man vs. Monday	Short Film (Co-Produced with Ian Ziering)
2008	Yanni: Voices	Live DVD
2009	William Shatner's Gonzo Ballet	Documentary
