= Has Been =

Studio album by William Shatner
- Released: October 5, 2004
- Genres: Indie rock; spoken word
- Length: 39:49
- Label: Shout! Factory
- Producer: Ben Folds

William Shatner chronology
William Shatner Live (1977)	Has Been (2004)	Exodus: An Oratorio in Three Parts (2008)

Singles from Has Been
- 1. "Common People" Released: 2004

Professional ratings
Review scores
Source	Rating
AllMusic	4/5 stars
The Guardian	neutral
Pitchfork	7.5/10

Has Been is the second studio album by Canadian actor William Shatner, released on October 5, 2004. His first studio album since 1968's The Transformed Man, the album was produced and arranged by Ben Folds, and most of the songs are written by Folds and Shatner, with Folds creating arrangements for Shatner's prose-poems. The album features guest appearances from Joe Jackson (on a cover of Pulp's "Common People"), Folds and Aimee Mann (backup vocals on "That's Me Trying"), Lemon Jelly (on "Together"), Henry Rollins, Adrian Belew (on "I Can't Get Behind That"), and Brad Paisley (on "Real", which he wrote specifically for Shatner).

== History ==
Joe Jackson explained his involvement in an interview, saying:

That came through Ben Folds, who's a big fan of mine. You’d have to ask him how he got hooked up with Bill Shatner, I don't remember. But I think he did a really great job of putting an album behind Shatner that is fun and not completely cheesy, though when it is too cheesy, it's deliberately so. (laughs) It's just a very musically satisfying record, and when he asked me to be a part of it, why would I not? How could I refuse? I went to Nashville for a few days and hung out with the two of them, and we created a couple of masterpieces.

He ultimately said about working with Shatner, "He's wonderful, very musical, and very funny, because he's so obviously in on the joke". Originally, Weezer and former U.S. President Bill Clinton were set to be featured on the album but by the time Weezer responded, Clinton had already backed out.

In 2007, a ballet called Common People, set to Has Been, was created by Margo Sappington (of Oh! Calcutta! fame) and performed by the Milwaukee Ballet. Shatner attended the première and had the event filmed. This footage became William Shatner's Gonzo Ballet, a feature film which premiered at the Nashville Film Festival on April 17, 2009. The documentary also features interviews with Shatner, Folds, and Henry Rollins.

== Track listing ==
1. "Common People" (Nick Banks, Jarvis Cocker, Candida Doyle, Steve Mackey, Russell Senior) – 4:40
2. "It Hasn't Happened Yet" (Ben Folds, William Shatner) – 3:49
3. "You'll Have Time" (Folds, W. Shatner) – 5:18
4. "That's Me Trying" (Folds, Nick Hornby) – 3:48
5. "What Have You Done" (W. Shatner) – 1:46
6. "Together" (Lemon Jelly, Elizabeth Shatner, W. Shatner) – 5:39
7. "Familiar Love" (Folds, W. Shatner) – 4:00
8. "Ideal Woman" (Folds, W. Shatner) – 2:23
9. "Has Been" (Folds, W. Shatner) – 2:18
10. "I Can't Get Behind That" (Folds, Henry Rollins, W. Shatner) – 3:00
11. "Real" (Brad Paisley) – 3:08

== Personnel ==
Musicians

- William Shatner – vocals
- Joe Jackson – guest vocals (1), piano (3), cowboy vocals (9)
- Lindsay Jamieson – drums (1)
- Ben Folds – bass guitar, synthesizer (1), piano (2, 4, 7), Wurlitzer granny organ (3, 8), guest vocals, background ahhs (4), electric piano (8, 11), tack piano (9), drums (11)
- John Mark Painter – guitars (1, 3, 7), bass guitar (2, 4, 8), background ahhs (4), cowboy vocals, baritone guitar, trumpets (9), bass guitar (11)
- Louisville Common People's Choir – background vocals (1)
- Jon Auer – guitars (2, 4, 8–9), background ahhs (4), electric guitars (7), cowboy vocals (9)
- Matt Chamberlain – drums (2–4, 7–8, 10), percussion (9–10)
- Fleming McWilliams – Goddess of Yosemite (2)
- Kim Richey – gospel choir (3)
- Webb Wilder – gospel choir (3)
- John Davis – gospel choir (3)
- Jared Reynolds – gospel choir (3)
- Carmella Ramsey – gospel choir (3)
- Sebastian Steinberg – bass guitar (3), upright bass (5, 7, 10), cowboy vocals (9)
- Aimee Mann – guest vocals (4)
- Lemon Jelly – programming, all instruments (6)
- Benita Hill – choir (7)
- Laurie Wheeler – choir (7)
- Nick Wheeler – choir (7)
- Curt Bol – choir (7)
- Henry Rollins – guest vocals (10)
- Adrian Belew – guitar (10)
- Brad Paisley – guest vocals, guitar (11)

Technical

- Ben Folds – producer, arranger, mixing, art direction
- Joe Costa – engineer, mixing
- Ted Jensen – mastering
- Alan Wolmark – executive producer
- Smog Design, Inc. – art design
- Jeri Heiden – package design, photography
- Ryan Corey – package design
- John Heiden – package design
- Frally Folds – photography

== Charts ==
=== Album ===
Chart (2004)	Position
Billboard Top Heatseekers	22

=== Song ===
Song	Chart (2004)	Position
"Common People"	Triple J Hottest 100, 2004	21

== See also ==
- William Shatner's musical career
