= Michael J. Byron (artist) =

American visual artist (born in 1954)

- Born: August 18, 1954 (age 72)
- Occupation: Artist

Academic background
- Education: Kansas City Art Institute; Nova Scotia College of Art and Design

Academic work
- Discipline: Art
- Institutions: Washington University in St. Louis

Michael J. Byron (born August 18, 1954) is an American visual artist. He holds a B.F.A from the Kansas City Art Institute and a M.F.A from Nova Scotia College of Art and Design. Byron currently lives in St. Louis, Missouri and is a former professor at Washington University in St. Louis. In 1996, Byron was the first person to hold the Henry L. and Natalie E. Freund Teaching Fellowship at the Sam Fox School of Design & Visual Art.

== Exhibition history ==
Byron had his first one-person exhibition in May 1982, an installation entitled For the Nun at Artists Space, NYC. His work was included in this venue in the group exhibitions Social Spaces, 1988, and demonclownmonkey, 2002. He had one person and group exhibitions in other spaces for the next two years culminating in his participation in An International Survey of Recent Painting and Sculpture at the Museum of Modern Art in 1984.

The basic character of Byron's studio practice and conceptual investigation developed at this time while participating in P.S.1's National Studio Program (1982–1983).

In 1986, Byron was photographed and included in David Robbins's portrait series Talent, a collection of 18 portraits of artists (including Jenny Holtzer and Jeff Koons) that is credited with announcing the age of the celebrity artist. From 1984 to 1989, Byron continued to work and exhibit in New York City as well as in solo and group exhibitions in galleries elsewhere in the United States and in Europe. After participating in the 1989 Whitney Biennial, Byron moved to Amsterdam in the Netherlands where he lived and worked for five years.

Other exhibitions include: As Far as Amsterdam Goes, 1985, at the Stedelijk Museum, Amsterdam, the Netherlands: the Musee Départemental d'Art Ancien et Contemporain, in Epinal, France, 1992, and the 43rd Biennial of Contemporary American Painting at the Corcoran Museum of Art, Washington, D.C., in 1993. In 1997 Byron participated in group exhibitions at the Staatsgalerie Stuttgart, The Magic of Numbersin Stuttgart, Germany and the Cedar Rapids Museum of Art's The City Series: St. Louis, in Cedar Rapids, Iowa and in April, 2000, the "Deja Vu" exhibition at the Katonah Museum of Art in Katonah, N.Y.

Solo museum exhibitions include the Aldrich Museum of Contemporary Art, Ridgefield, Connecticut, 1987, a joint exhibition sponsored by the Witte de With Center for Contemporary Art and the Boijmans-van Beuningen Museum, both in Rotterdam, 1991. In March 1996, a group of paintings entitled Short Stories were exhibited in the Current Solo Exhibition Program at the Saint Louis Art Museum. The Amitin Notebook Project first exhibited at the Contemporary Art Museum, St. Louis, November 2001–February 2002, traveled to the Blaffer Gallery, the Museum of the University of Texas, Houston, June–September 2002. An exhibition entitled "Cosmic Tears" opened at the Museum of Contemporary Religious Art, St. Louis in September 2009.

== Bibliography – Catalogues of One Person Exhibitions ==
- The Amitin Notebook Sketchbook, text by Mel Watkin & Michael Byron, Forum for Contemporary Art (2001)
- Mind Fields, Michael Byron, text by Douglas Blau, Lund, Sweden, Anders Tornberg Gallery (1994)
- Michael Byron, text by Roxana Marcoci, New York, New York, and Galerie Philippe Gravier, Paris, France, Elga Wimmer Gallery (1993)
- Michael Byron, text by Holland Cotter, Witte de With Center for Contemporary Art Rotterdam The Netherlands, and Museum Boymans-van Beuningen, Rotterdam, The Netherlands (1991)
- Michael Byron, Cologne, Germany, Galerie Gisela Capitain (1990)
