= Modus Operandi (film) =

- Theatrical release poster
- Directed by: Frankie Latina
- Written by: Frankie Latina; Andrew Swant
- Produced by: Sasha Grey; Bobby Ciraldo; Danny Trejo; Janet K. Beasley
- Starring: Randy Russell; Danny Trejo; Mark Borchardt; Michael Sottile; Mark Metcalf; Ayesha Mohan; Samwell; Barry Poltermann; Andrew Swant; Bobby Ciraldo; Sarah Price
- Cinematography: Mark Escribano
- Music by: Peter Batchelder; Ray Chi; Didier Leplae; Nick Pipitone; Renato Umali; Joe Wong
- Production companies: Frankie Latina Motion Pictures; Special Entertainment; Reign Supreme Entertainment
- Distributed by: Kino
- Release date: June 2009 (CineVegas Film Festival)
- Running time: 80 minutes
- Country: United States
- Language: English

Modus Operandi, directed by Frankie Latina, is an independent feature film shot in Milwaukee, Wisconsin and Tokyo, Japan. Latina examines the exploitation film genre through a revenge tale about a desperate C.I.A. agent on a mission to find the man who murdered his wife.

The film stars Danny Trejo (Machete, Heat, Predators), Mark Borchardt (American Movie), Michael Sottile (Reservoir Dogs), and Randy Russell (American Job) as Agent Stanley Cashay.

Modus Operandi was produced by Frankie Latina Motion Pictures, Special Entertainment and Reign Supreme Entertainment, and was distributed on DVD, Video On Demand, Netflix, and Redbox by Kino on February 14, 2012.

== Plot summary ==
Two briefcases with mysterious contents are stolen from top Presidential candidate Squire Parks, setting off a deadly series of double-crosses and betrayals. Desperate warring factions of subterranean organizations will stop at nothing to gain possession of the sensitive material. A covert branch of the CIA calls on notorious Black Ops agent Stanley Cashay, who has been barely existing in a semi-comatose twilight since the murder of his wife. Cashay is offered the identity of his wife's killer in exchange for locating and returning the cases.

Agent Cashay uses the most dangerous weapons at his command, the telephone and his reputation, to unleash a bizarre assortment of operatives, including the deliciously sleazy Casey Thunderbird and exotic Tokyo-based special agent Black Licorice. Along with scores of other beguiling rogues, they initiate a horrifying chain of events, including ruthless torture and brutal killings. When Cashay is finally in possession of the stolen materials, the contents of the briefcases shock even him, and he makes a decision that will change the course of history. Cashay then sets the wheels in motion for bitter revenge and harsh justice, but not before the entire operation is nearly derailed as merciless underworld forces fight back. The final chapters play out as an increasingly surreal vision of modern reality, skirting the edge of sanity and culminating with the wrath of the powerful Director Holiday, a man who would put the fear of God into God Himself.

== Release ==
The film premiered at the CineVegas Film Festival in June 2009, where it received critical acclaim and obtained sales representation from Submarine Entertainment. Modus Operandi was an official entry in the American Film Institute Film Festival where it screened at the historic Mann's Chinese Theater in Los Angeles in October 2009. The film played to sold-out audiences at the historic Landmark Oriental Theater during the Milwaukee Film Festival.

The film started its theatrical run on September 10, 2010, at the IFC Center in New York City, with a pre-screening introduction from Sasha Grey and appearances by Danny Trejo and Mark Borchardt.

== Critical reception ==
The film received generally positive reviews. As of October 16, 2023, the film holds a 63% approval rating based on 8 reviews on Rotten Tomatoes. Critic Roger Ebert of the Chicago Sun Times gave the film a positive review and called it a "special pleasure". Mike Hale of the New York Times said "Frankie Latina’s Modus Operandi bears a greater surface resemblance to the 1960s and ’70s genre films to which it pays homage than Quentin Tarantino and Robert Rodriguez’s Grindhouse did." Eric Hynes of the Village Voice called the film "seriously seedy and truly inspired", and Kyle Smith of the New York Post referred to the film as "Genius-level garbage".
