= Canada on Strike =

- South Park episode
- Episode no.: Season 12; Episode 4
- Directed by: Trey Parker
- Written by: Trey Parker
- Production code: 1204
- Original air date: April 2, 2008

Episode chronology
← Previous "Major Boobage"	Next → "Eek, a Penis!"
- South Park season 12

"Canada on Strike" is the fourth episode in the twelfth season of the American animated television series South Park. The 171st episode of the series overall, it first aired on Comedy Central in the United States on April 2, 2008. In the episode, the nation of Canada, feeling disrespected by the rest of the world, goes on a general strike, demanding money, spurring the boys to raise money by creating a viral video.

Written and directed by series co-creator Trey Parker, the episode was inspired by the 2007–2008 Writers Guild of America strike. It features appearances by the creators of a number of famous viral videos. The episode was rated TV-MA L for strong language in the United States.

== Plot ==
Mr. Mackey informs the students that it is Canada Appreciation Day and plays a video in which Stephen Abootman, President of the World Canadian Bureau (initialism: WGA), asks the students to remember all of Canada's contributions to the world. The students mock both the video and the country, a reaction shared by much of the world; in response, Abootman declares that all of Canada will go on strike.

At a meeting of world leaders, Abootman's announcement of the strike is met with general puzzlement as to exactly what Canada wants. He demands money from the Internet, but storms out when the other delegates try to explain that they cannot simply give money to Canada. Kyle's adopted Canadian brother Ike begins to picket outside the family home in South Park, but Kyle's friends are too busy watching Terrance and Phillip to pay attention to his concerns. Realizing that the show has gone into reruns due to the strike, they call Abootman in an attempt to persuade him to end it. They agree that Canada deserves more money, but have none of their own to give.

The boys form a plan to raise money from the Internet by recording and posting a video of Butters singing Samwell's song "What What (In the Butt)". After the video goes viral, they visit the Colorado Department of Internet Money to claim their earnings, but must wait their turn behind several other Internet sensations, consisting of Tay Zonday, Afro Ninja, Tai Shan the Sneezing Panda, Laughing Baby, Dramatic Chipmunk, Chris Crocker, Tron Guy, the Star Wars Kid, and Numa Numa. A violent argument breaks out over who is the most famous, leading most of the other applicants to kill one another while leaving the boys unharmed. They receive 10 million "theoretical dollars," printed on transparent plastic cheques with no monetary value.

The strike continues, resulting in the deaths of many Canadians from starvation and the United States' decision to bring in Danish people to fill their positions. Abootman maintains his resolve, questioning the loyalty of Terrance and Phillip when they voice doubts about his strategy and rejecting the boys' offer of the theoretical dollars as worthless. Seeing that Abootman wants to feel as if he has won something, Kyle persuades the other world leaders to give Canada a consolation prize, which turns out to be a supply of bubble gum and Bennigan's coupons. With the strike now ended, the boys return home and Kyle comments on the challenges that content creators face in using the Internet as a source of revenue.

During a celebration party thrown by Abootman, Terrance and Phillip announced the results of their research: the Canadian public lost $10.4 million by not working during the strike, while the coupons and the gum have a total value of roughly $3,008. Infuriated over Abootman's inept handling of the situation, the Canadians set him and his staff adrift on an ice floe.

== Theme ==
The episode was a criticism of the 2007–2008 Writers Guild of America strike. TV Squad's Brad Trechak noted that "Trey Parker and Matt Stone are not members of any of the unions, and they negotiated Internet profit-sharing before it became an issue for the WGA. They have also remained consistent with their dislike of the Hollywood creative elite (including actors and writers, although they are both) and their willingness to take a different viewpoint than the popular media." IGN's Travis Fickett stated that "It was probably inevitable that South Park would comment on the writers' strike in some fashion, and here they do – by way of Canada." The A.V. Club's Josh Modell suggested that "it's clear that Parker and Stone feel that the writers completely screwed themselves in the long run, but that subplot is almost beside the point."

In the DVD commentary the creators claim the episode is a "docudrama" instead of a parody of the strike. The strike took place during the making of "The List" during which the creators lamented that they had to work instead of joining with the strike.

== Reception ==
Josh Modell of The A.V. Club gave the episode an A grade, saying that it "was a great episode because the jokes came quick and funny, not because there was some huge point to be made". A notable part of the episode for him was the viral video, "What What (In the Butt)".

Travis Fickett of IGN gave the episode a rating of 7.6. He noted that though it was an "issue" episode, it was still humorous, unlike other such episodes like "Britney's New Look". Overall, while it wasn't a bad episode "the show muddles the argument it's trying to make by letting the parallels to Canada get off track."

Brad Trechak of TV Squad noted especially "the battle royal [sic] scene with all the YouTube people" and the "scintillating conversation" of the Canadians at the episode end. Trechak was "happy to see South Park get back on track to the focus and humor from the previous seasons."

== Lawsuit ==
In November 2010, Comedy Central and Viacom, Comedy Central's parent company, were sued for copyright infringement for their recreation of the viral video, "What What (In the Butt)". The case was dismissed with prejudice before discovery. Brownmark Films appealed in the 7th Circuit Court of Appeals, which ruled in favor of Comedy Central in June 2012, holding that the parody was protected under fair use laws, and noting that, as demonstrated in the episode, Brownmark's loss of revenue could only be measured in the sense of "Internet dollars" and of no measurable commercial value; if anything, South Park's lampooning of "What What (In the Butt)" "would only increase [the original video's] ad revenue" on YouTube.

== Home release ==
"Canada on Strike", along with the thirteen other episodes from South Park's twelfth season, were released on a three-disc DVD set and two-disc Blu-ray set in the United States on March 10, 2009. The sets included brief audio commentaries by Parker and Stone for each episode, a collection of deleted scenes, and two special mini-features, The Making of Major Boobage and Six Days to South Park.
