= Margo Sappington =

American choreographer and dancer (born 1947)

Margo Sappington (born July 30, 1947, in Baytown, Texas) is an American choreographer and dancer. She was nominated in 1975 for both a Tony Award as Best Choreographer and a Drama Desk Award for Outstanding Choreography for her work on the play Where's Charley?. In 1988, her ballet Virgin Forest was the subject of an award-winning documentary by PBS. In 2005 she received a Lifetime Achievement Award for choreography from the Joffrey Ballet.

== Career ==
Sappington joined the Joffrey Ballet in 1965 at the personal invitation of founder Robert Joffrey.

In 1969, she co-wrote, choreographed, and performed in the original off-Broadway revue Oh! Calcutta! , and, in 1971, she choreographed Weewis, her first ballet.

In 1975, in recognition of her work in the Broadway revival of Where's Charley?, she received nominations for both a Tony Award for Best Choreographer and a Drama Desk Award for Outstanding Choreography.

In 1983, as the first American choreographer working with Beijing's Central Ballet of China, Sappington created their ballet Heliotrope. In 1988, her ballet Virgin Forest, inspired by Henri Rousseau's jungle paintings, was created for the Milwaukee Ballet and was the subject of an award-winning documentary by PBS.

In 1993, as a section of the Joffrey's evening-length performance Billboards, she created and danced in Slide, as scored by musician Prince.

In 2001, with the participation of the group The Indigo Girls, Sappington created a piece called The Indigo Girls Project for the Atlanta Ballet. In 2005, for Charles Strouse's Real Men at the Coconut Grove Playhouse, she created and danced a role in the premiere. Also in 2005, she received a Lifetime Achievement Award presented to her by the Joffrey Ballet in recognition of her service to the arts.

In 2007, Sappington created a ballet called Common People, set to William Shatner's album, Has Been, which was performed by the Milwaukee Ballet. Shatner attended the premiere and filmed the event, footage of which became Gonzo Ballet, a feature film to be released in 2009.

In the United States, her choreography has been used by companies such as the Alvin Ailey American Dance Theater, Carolina Ballet, the Joffrey Ballet, the Houston Ballet, the Harkness Ballet, the Milwaukee Ballet, Pacific Northwest Ballet, and the Pennsylvania Ballet, and internationally by companies including Aterballetto and Nederlands Dans Theater. She has also choreographed for many opera productions, including Aida, Samson and Delilah, and La Gioconda for the San Francisco Opera.

=== Performer ===
- Oh! Calcutta! (original) (1969–1972)
- Promises, Promises (1968–1972)

=== Choreography ===
- Doonesbury (1983–1984)
- Play Me a Country Song (1982)
- Oh! Calcutta! (revival) (1976–1989)
- Pal Joey (revival) (1976)
- Where's Charley? (revival) (1974–1975)

=== Film and television ===
- William Shatner's Gonzo Ballet (2009) (choreographer, writer)
- The Daring Project (2009) (herself)
- Billboards: Prince at the Joffrey (1994) (choreographer)
- The Baby-Sitters Club (1990 TV series) (choreographer)
- Samson and Delilah (1981) (choreographer)
- Rodin mis en vie (1976) (actress)
- Oh! Calcutta! (1972) (actress, choreographer, writer)
- Bracken's World, episode Fallen, Fallen Is Babylon (actress and choreographer)
- 23rd Annual Tony Awards (1969) (performer)

== Awards and nominations ==
- 1975 Tony Award nomination as Best Choreographer
- 1975 Drama Desk Award nomination for Outstanding Choreography
- 2005 Lifetime Achievement Award for choreography
