= Kumar Pallana =

Indian-American character actor and vaudevillian (1918-2013)

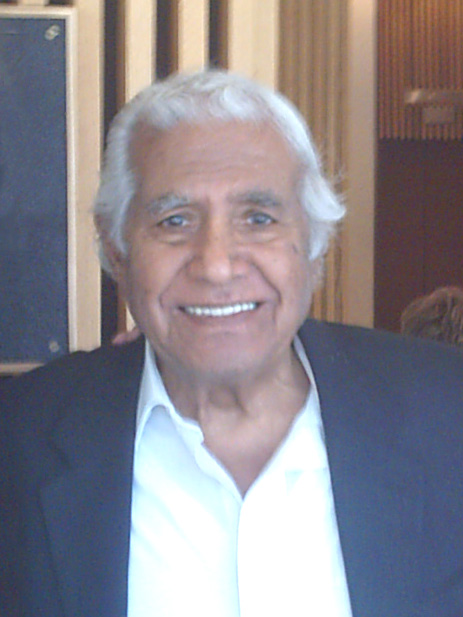
- Kumar Pallana in 2006
- Born: Kumar Valavhadas Pallana; 23 December 1918; Indore, British Raj
- Died: 10 October 2013 (aged 94); Oakland, California, U.S.
- Occupation: Actor
- Years active: 1952–2013

Kumar Valavhadas Pallana (23 December 1918 – 10 October 2013) was an Indian-American character actor. He performed on television on the Mickey Mouse Club, The Ed Sullivan Show, and You Asked for It as a plate spinner and juggler. He is best known for playing significant characters in Wes Anderson's first three movies: Bottle Rocket (1996), Rushmore (1998) and The Royal Tenenbaums (2001). He also acted in Steven Spielberg's The Terminal (2004).

== Career ==
Pallana moved to the United States in 1946 and spent 20 years performing around the country before settling down in Texas at his wife's insistence, and started a yoga studio.

Pallana was married to Ranjana Jethwa and had two children, son Dipak and daughter Sandhya. His son Dipak created, owned, and operated a cafe called the Cosmic Cup (now Cosmic Cafe) in Dallas, where Kumar met director Wes Anderson and actor Owen Wilson. Anderson subsequently cast Pallana in his films Bottle Rocket, Rushmore, The Royal Tenenbaums, and The Darjeeling Limited. Pallana also appeared in the Bollywood movie Anjaana Anjaani (2010) and the acclaimed independent film Another Earth (2011). A short documentary, KUMAR:MKE, about Pallana's connection to the Milwaukee film scene, was released in 2015.

== Personal life and death ==
Pallana's daughter Sandhya Pallana worked with him on The Terminal and other productions. His son Dipak, also an actor, appeared in Anderson's films such as Bottle Rocket, Rushmore, and The Royal Tenenbaums.

Pallana died on 10 October 2013 at his home in Oakland, California at age 94.

== Filmography ==
Year	Title	Role	Notes
1952	Viva Zapata!	Soldier	Uncredited
1996	Bottle Rocket	Kumar	
1998	Rushmore	Mr. Littlejeans	
2001	The Royal Tenenbaums	Pagoda	
2002	Bomb the System	Kumar Baba	
2003	Duplex	Indian Restaurant Owner	
2004	The Terminal	Gupta Rajan	
2005	Romance & Cigarettes	Da Da Kumar	
2006	The Gold Bracelet	Dhinubhai	
2006	RevoLOUtion	Kumar	
2006	10 Items or Less	Lee	
2007	The Darjeeling Limited	Old man on train	
2009	Karma Aur Holi	DJ Rav	
2009	Today's Special	Shah	
2010	Anjaana Anjaani	Coast guard	
2011	Another Earth	Purdeep	
2011	Hollywood Whores	Magic Man	
2011	Campus Radio	Yogi	
2012	Heavy Hands	The Clerk	
2014	Hamlet A.D.D.	Kumar	Posthumous
2019	Black Licorice	Kumar	Posthumous; Final film role
