= Jack Raymond (radio host) =

- Born: John Thomas Francis Raymond Besendorfer; April 23, 1914; Milwaukee, Wisconsin, United States
- Died: January 30, 1975 (aged 60); Milwaukee, Wisconsin, United States
- Occupation: Radio personality
- Years active: 1940s–1975

Jack Raymond (April 23, 1914 – January 30, 1975) was an American radio host who was active from the late 1930s until his death in 1975.

As a young man, Raymond briefly attended seminary. At one point, he was engaged to four different women at the same time.

During his career in broadcasting, Raymond's most popular shows were "Worth Listening To" (1943-1955 on WISN) and "The Jack Raymond Show" (1957-1975 on fifty stations across the United States). Raymond was also the news commentator for "News of the World" and a narrator on "Family Theater." During his career, he worked at many Milwaukee radio stations including WISN, WFOX, WEMP, WRIT, and WYLO. In the 1930s, he also worked at WGN in Chicago and WIBU.

Raymond died in 1975 from a heart attack. The Jack Raymond Show currently airs at noon and from 11:00-midnight on WCFW and has gained a resurgence in popularity and a cult following. Raymond was the subject of a documentary titled Silently Steal Away which premiered at the Eaux Claires Festival and Wisconsin Film Festival.
