= The Jeffrey Dahmer Files =

- Official film poster
- Directed by: Chris James Thompson
- Written by: Chris James Thompson; Andrew Swant; Joe Riepenhoff
- Produced by: Chris Smith; Barry Poltermann; Jack Turner; Chris James Thompson
- Starring: Andrew Swant; Jeffrey Jentzen; Pat Kennedy; Pamela Bass
- Cinematography: Michael T. Vollmann
- Edited by: Michael T. Vollmann, Chris James Thompson
- Music by: Robert Mulrennan; The Knife; The Books
- Distributed by: IFC Films
- Release date: March 2012 (SXSW Film Festival)
- Running time: 80 minutes
- Country: United States
- Language: English

The Jeffrey Dahmer Files (aka Jeff) is an independent documentary film about serial killer Jeffrey Dahmer during the summer of his arrest. The film was directed by Chris James Thompson and stars Andrew Swant as Dahmer in fictionalized re-enactment segments which are interwoven with interviews of the medical examiner assigned to the case (Jeffrey Jentzen), the lead detective (Pat Kennedy), and Dahmer's next door neighbor (Pamela Bass).

The film premiered at the 2012 SXSW film festival under the title Jeff, where it received positive reviews and obtained sales representation from Josh Braun at Submarine Entertainment. The film also played at the Hot Docs Canadian International Documentary Festival in Toronto, the Independent Film Festival of Boston, and the BFI London Film Festival.

The documentary was picked up by IFC Films who re-titled it The Jeffrey Dahmer Files. Jonathan Sehring, President of Sundance Selects/IFC Films, said: “Chris James Thompson has made one of the creepiest documentaries of the year that lingers in the mind long after the film has ended. He’s approached the well-known subject of Jeffrey Dahmer in a new and inventive way that managed to completely unnerve us." The film was released theatrically and on Video On Demand through IFC on February 15, 2013, followed by a DVD release. The film was later released on Netflix, Hulu, Amazon, AMC+, and Google Play.

The film was shot in Milwaukee, Wisconsin on Super 16 mm film over the course of three years. It was executive produced by Chris Smith (director of American Movie), Barry Poltermann, and Jack Turner.

== Plot synopsis ==
In 1991, Jeffrey Dahmer was arrested in Milwaukee, Wisconsin and sentenced to 957 years in prison for murdering 17 men and boys and dismembering their bodies. Jeff explores the city of Milwaukee by meeting those surrounding Dahmer during and after his hidden spree. Recollections from Milwaukee Medical Examiner Jeffrey Jentzen, Police Detective Patrick Kennedy, and neighbor Pamela Bass are interwoven with archival footage and everyday scenes from Dahmer's life, working collectively to disassemble the facade of an ordinary man leading an ordinary existence.

== Critical response ==
The film received generally positive reviews, many of them praising the director's restraint. Jeannette Catsoulis of The New York Times called the film "a meditation on perversion as hypnotic as it is repulsive" and labeled it a "Critics' Pick". Mark Olson of the Los Angeles Times called the film "quietly unnerving."

John DeFore of The Hollywood Reporter said that “Jeff stands apart from the true-crime pack" and called Swant's portrayal of Dahmer "eerily convincing.” John Gholson of Movies.com said “I’d go so far as to say that Jeff is one of the greatest serial killer movies ever made.”

Owen Gleiberman, writing for Entertainment Weekly, said the film was "for hardcore Dahmer obsessives only. Through a mix of documentary footage and staged scenes, director Chris James Thompson explores the days during which Dahmer’s crimes were first discovered. Interviews with the medical examiner on the scene and the officer who first interrogated Dahmer bring us into a newly queasy communion with the horror of his crimes."

The film won the Milwaukee Film Festival's Cream City Cinema Grand Jury Award for 2012.
