= Laughing Baby =

Viral video and internet meme

- Born: William Nilsson; Sweden
- Years active: 25 August 2006–present
- Known for: Comedy, cuteness

The Laughing Baby is a YouTube viral video of a baby laughing. The video became an internet phenomenon and has had a total of over 100 million views across multiple uploads. Originally uploaded by a Swedish man under the pseudonym of spacelord72, and later re-uploaded and popularized by another user known as BlackOleg, the "Laughing Baby" is one of the few internet memes that have entered popular culture. The original uploaded by spacelord72, has had 21 million views as of June 2021 and the reposting by BlackOleg, titled HaHaHa, achieved 62 million views by Sep 2008.

== The video ==
The Laughing Baby video, which was shot by a Swedish man in his kitchen in 2006, has a running time of 1:40, and involves a fixed camera situated on William Nilsson, a blond-haired, blue eyed baby, who laughs after brief interjections from a voice in the background (presumably his father, Kjell-Åke Andersson). The video opens with the Swedish text: "kan man ha roligare" which translates as "Can you have any more fun?"

=== Comments ===
The clip has become known for its disparate variety of commenters – from the amused to those concerned for the baby's health. These comments were the focus of a Slate article by Michael Agger, who remarked that uploading the video was like "dipping a bunny into acid," further adding that the "Laughing Baby has become an internet monument, and posting a remark is like tagging your name on the Statue of Liberty."

== Impact ==
The Laughing Baby video became a worldwide phenomenon and the tenth most viewed YouTube video of all time. Its success is attributed to "cuteness" and its "adorable nature". The video appeared on the front pages of web portals such as msn.com, and has been the theme of several ringtones, which helped to further increase its familiarity and popularity. The baby was featured in the South Park episode "Canada on Strike", where he appeared alongside other YouTube celebrities such as Tay Zonday and Chris Crocker.

The "Laughing Baby" video was shown to Queen Elizabeth II and her husband Prince Philip during a 16 October 2008 visit to Google headquarters in Victoria, London. The Queen remarked that the child was a "...lovely little thing, isn't it?" and that it was "Amazing [that] a child would laugh like that."
