= Something Theater =

- Created by: Bobby Ciraldo; David Robbins; Andrew Swant

Production
- Running time: approx. 30 minutes

Original release
- Network: The CW affiliate WVTV
- Release: February 13, 2009 – present

Something Theater is an American television show created by Bobby Ciraldo, David Robbins, and Andrew Swant. The half-hour program has aired in Southeastern Wisconsin on The CW affiliate WVTV since February 2009. It is broadcast from Milwaukee, Wisconsin on a bi-monthly basis, usually on a Friday night.

Episodes of Something Theater typically have nothing to do with one another, so viewers never know what to expect. Each episode is usually split into short comedic segments that feature animation, music videos, viral videos, short films, or experimental films.

In December 2009 an episode aired which featured outtakes from the 2014 feature film Hamlet A.D.D..

In May 2010 David Robbins produced an episode entitled "The County Line" which was later shown at The Suburban gallery, curated by Michelle Grabner, and at the No Soul For Sale art fair at the Tate Modern in London.

In July 2010 Something Theater aired an episode that featured a 30-minute version of Gas 'N Fuel, a short film made by the creators of the Found Footage Festival. A 15-minute version of the film had previously screened at the South by Southwest Film Festival and 12 other film festivals.

In September 2010 an episode of Something Theater screened at the Oriental Landmark Theatre as part of the Milwaukee Film Festival.

In July 2011 an episode entitled "The Title is a Drawing" aired which was made by Los Angeles–based artist/filmmaker Marc Horowitz.

Steven Hyden of The Onion and The A.V. Club called the series, "All weird, all the time." Mary Louise Schumacher of the Milwaukee Journal Sentinel said, "This is not art for artists. Swant, Ciraldo and Robbins obviously love TV themselves and are earnestly trying to create something for a mainstream audience. This is far more rare than you might expect. In fact, I don’t know of any contemporary artists who are trying to make TV shows."
