= Flora Wiegmann =

American choreographer and dancer

- Born: 1976 (age 49–50); Lincoln, Nebraska, US
- Known for: dance, choreographer
- Website: florawiegmann.com

Flora Wiegmann (born 1976 in Lincoln, Nebraska) is an American dancer, choreographer and filmmaker based in Los Angeles.

== Education ==
Wiegmann earned her dance BA from Columbia College Chicago and her MFA from UCLA's Department of Art and Architecture.

== Career ==
Wiegmann has exhibited at the Whitney Museum of American Art, The Kitchen, Institute of Contemporary Art, Philadelphia, Contemporary Arts Museum Houston, the Roberts Institute of Art, Camden Arts Centre in London, and the Walter Phillips Gallery in Banff, Canada.

Wiegmann's work incorporates film, site-specificity, endurance and collaboration with visual artists such as Fritz Haeg, Drew Heitzler, Silke Otto-Knapp, Alix Lambert, Margo Victor, and Andrea Zittel.
