= Talent (artwork) =

Photographic work by David Robbins

Talent (1986), is a photographic work by David Robbins comprising eighteen photographs that depict contemporary artists such as Cindy Sherman, Jeff Koons, Jenny Holzer, Robert Longo, Michael J Byron, and thirteen others using the headshot portraits long-utilized by the entertainment industry.

To make the 8 x 10, black-and-white photographs Robbins hired the James J. Kriegsmann studio, a company specializing in headshot photography. During the several-month long period of making the photographs in Kriegsmann's Times Square studio in New York City, Robbins functioned as the "agent" for the artists – scheduling the shoots, styling the artists' look, and paying the bill. The resultant collection of headshots were produced in an edition of 100 as, according to the Kriegsmann Studio, aspiring entertainers seeking work customarily order them.

Talent updated the image of the artist from that of modern art's tortured genius to, instead, a more complex portrayal of a willing participant in the entertainment industry. The piece was instrumental in modernizing the art context for the Information Age. Visual artists such as Degas and Picasso had long depicted musicians, harlequins, and actors using fine art media, and the Pop artists had introduced commercial production techniques such as silkscreen to create images taken from popular culture, but Talent collapsed the distance at which visual artists had previously held entertainment culture.

The eighteen artists featured in the piece include Cindy Sherman, Jeff Koons, Jenny Holzer, Robert Longo, Allan McCollum, Ashley Bickerton, Michael J. Byron, Thomas Lawson, Clegg & Guttmann, Jennifer Bolande, Larry Johnson, Alan Belcher, Peter Nagy, Steven Parrino, Joel Otterson, Robin Weglinski, Gretchen Bender, and David Robbins.

In May 2012 artist Michelle Grabner curated "25 Years of Talent," an exhibition at Marianne Boesky Gallery, New York, featuring later work from each of the artists included in the original piece.
