= Pill Awards =

The Pill Awards are an annual awards ceremony held in New York City. Organized by Public-access television cable TV television show ADD-TV, the awards honor artists in the LGBT community and is the brain child of cinematographers and editors George Lyter and David P. Morrow.

== Selected winners ==
Awardee	Award	Year	For
Amanda Lepore	Best Wardrobe	2010	"Cotton Candy"
Austin Young	Best Short	2010	"Gimme More" (episode 6) of The Worm
Austin Young	Best Director of a Short (Documentary or Narrative)	2010	"The Opponent" (episode 7) of The Worm
Cazwell	Best White Trash/Ghetto	2010	"I Seen Beyoncé at Burger King" featuring Jonny Makeup
Colton Ford	Sexy Pill	2010	"That's Me
Junior Vasquez	Lifetime Achievement Award	2010	
Samwell	Parody Pill	2010	"Samwell Goes to the Woods"
Samwell	Best Animationa/FX	2010	"What What (in the Butt)"
Sherry Vine	Best Drag	2010	"Supersizer"
Whore's Mascara	Virgin Pill (newcomer to ADD-TV)	2010	"All I Want"
Wolfgang Busch	Best Documentary	2007	"How Do I Look documentary"
Nick Name	Best Video	2003	"Who's Your Daddy?"
