= Angstrom Gallery =

- Established: 1998
- Location: Dallas, Los Angeles
- Type: Contemporary art gallery
- Owner: David Quadrini

Angstrom Gallery is an art gallery in Dallas, Texas and Los Angeles, California.

Founded by American art dealer David Quadrini, the gallery opened its doors in 1998 in Dallas and later in Los Angeles in the summer of 2002. Angstrom Gallery focuses on cutting edge exhibitions with artists including Mark Flood, Jeff Elrod, Phyllida Barlow, Brian Bress, Tim Bavington, Ryan Trecartin, Inka Essenhigh, Steven Hull, and Scott Reeder.

Angstrom Gallery is known for closely collaborating with institutions and museums including the Nasher Sculpture Center, Los Angeles County Museum of Art, Dallas Museum of Art, and Dallas Contemporary.
