= Bert Rodriguez =

American visual artist and composer

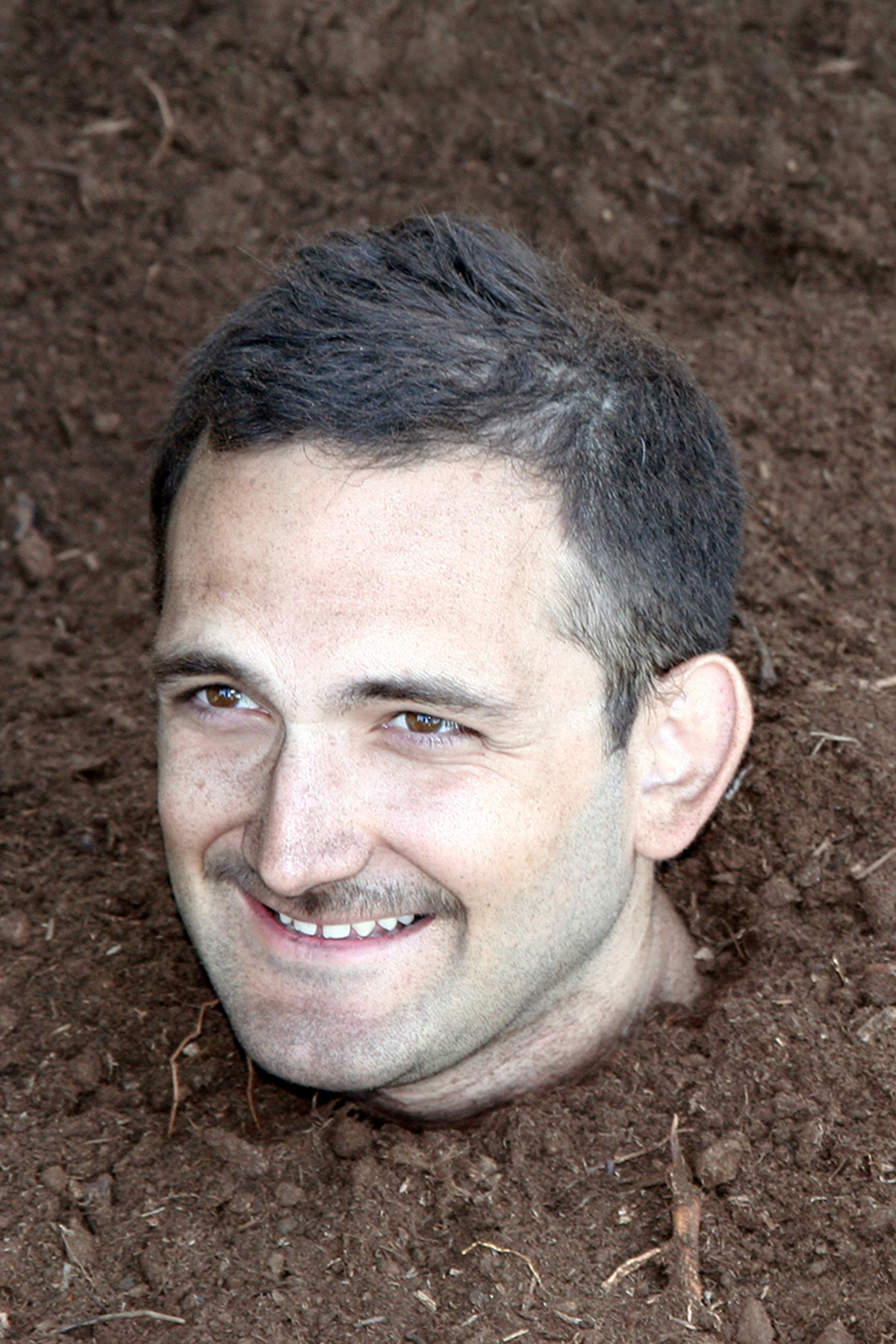
- Bert Rodriguez, What A Tree Feels Like (Bass Museum), performance-based installation, 2009
- Born: Miami, Florida
- Education: New World School of the Arts, Miami, Florida
- Known for: Installation art, performance, photography, sculpture, film, video, sound

Bert Rodriguez (born 1975 in Miami, Florida) is an American visual artist and composer based in Los Angeles, California. Rodriguez is most notable for his performance art but also works with a wide range of other media and genres including, installation, photography, sculpture, film, video and sound. Rodriguez uses various methods to translate his ideas which explore the relationship existing between art and audience. A winner of a Frieze Foundation Commission, his work has been displayed in the 2008 Whitney Biennial, in Berlin at Sassa Trülzsch and in Naples at Annarumma 404, among others. Rodriguez has a BFA in painting from New World School of the Arts in Miami, Florida, and also attended Skowhegan School of Painting and Sculpture in Skowhegan, Maine.

== Work ==
Rodriguez relies heavily on process and performance and he uses various methods to translate his ideas. Operating largely outside traditional commercial art practices and with shrewd yet playful wit, Rodriguez's multifarious practice is meant to educate, amuse, perplex and enrich his audience while quietly commenting on the contemporary art world. He is known for pieces like What a Tree Feels Like, where he “planted” himself in the ground at the entrance to Miami's Bass Museum of Art, or Advertising Works! for which he rented out wall space at Fredric Snitzer Gallery to anyone who wanted to place an ad and then signed the ads and sold them as his own work.

Rodriguez's work has been shown both nationally and abroad, including exhibitions at several prestigious institutions such as, New Work Miami at the Miami Art Museum, In Your Own Image: The Best of Bert Rodriguez Greatest Hits Vol. I at the Bass Museum of Art in Miami Beach, the Whitney Biennial at the Whitney Museum of American Art in New York, At This Time at the Rubell Family Collection in Miami and Becoming Father, Becoming Infant at The Bronx Museum of the Arts in New York.

In 2008, his work featured in the Whitney Biennial was a piece that involved him giving free therapeutic sessions inside a large white cube installed in the middle of an ornate room and assigning "patients" artwork projects as remedies for their problems. A muffled version of these discussions audible outside his "office" suggested a ghostlike presence that reflected and intensified the Armory's haunting ambience. That same year Rodriguez was featured at the Frieze Foundation Art Fair as a performance-based installation. The installation consisted of a massage station located in a centralized, highly trafficked area of the fair. At certain times for the duration of the fair, Rodriguez was available to perform a ten-minute foot massage for any weary visitors walking through.

In 2010, Rodriguez posed on the cover of Miami New Times, recreating the same covershoot of W magazine's: Art Issue with Kim Kardashian. The cover was shot by Mark Seliger, the same photographer of Kardashian's original cover. Shortly after, the photos went viral.

In 2011, Rodriguez brought his collaborative performance, A Meal I Make With My Mother, to Los Angeles where he prepared and served a traditional Cuban meal of rice and beans, picadillo (a tomato-based dish of ground beef, olives and peppers) and sweet plantains for his solo exhibition at the OHWOW gallery. This marked its third incarnation as he previously performed at Frac Ile-de-France/Le Plateau in Paris, France in 2008, and at Western Bridge in Seattle, Washington in 2009. This unfolding piece was meant to highlight, "the poignant beauty of familial bonds through the simple act of cooking and eating together."

In December 2012, Rodriguez was commissioned to build a large site-specific sculpture for a docked celebrity cruise liner called, "Reflection". The piece revealed his hyperbolic work in the ship's upper grand foyer and was a living tree, suspended in mid-air, reflecting upon itself. The tree above was a living, natural tree and below, hanging upside down, was a tree made of cast aluminum and electrical lighting. By using physical reflection, shiny surfaces and a real tree, Rodriguez hoped to allow for a more complex investigation of self-reflection within each viewer. In addition to the sculpture, he was also commissioned to come up with a performance piece to kick-off Art Basel and celebrate the ships maiden voyage. “Everywhere I Look I Only See Myself," was a performance piece where Rodriguez emphasized interaction and duality: two men, the artist and his “double” circulated through the event, interacting with guests, while both assumed the identity of “Bert Rodriguez.” The piece deliberately echoed the ship's name, Reflection, and the entire on board art collection related to themes of reflections and mirroring.

In 2013, Rodriguez exhibited a two-part installation piece titled, “I Will Always Let You Win.” It was delivered in the form of an arcade-style machine, where users were able to pick their prizes via a claw machine. The other part of the piece, a fluorescent sign, was a commentary on the relationship between emotional and physical gratification. The exhibition was part of an all day pop-up event at the Coachella Valley Music and Arts Festival.

Also in 2013, Rodriguez was among 10 nationally and internationally recognized contemporary artists commissioned by The Arts Initiative to build a site-specific piece inside the newly built Fashion Outlets of Chicago – the first fully enclosed multi-level fashion outlet center to appear in Chicago in more than two decades.

Officially cutting ties with galleries in January 2014, Rodriguez has embarked on a new venture, the Bert Rodriguez Museum, "a public institution charged with archiving the continuously evolving and expanding collection of artifacts surrounding his life". With its home base in West Hollywood, California, and still in the process of being open to the public, the BRM also has a nomadic component since Rodriguez opened BRM for three months in a San Francisco store front. The museum remained there until July 2014, and Rodriguez then took it elsewhere.

== Documentary ==
For three years director Bill Bilowit and producer Grela Orihuela of the Wet Heat Project shot a full-length documentary film based on Rodriguez called, Making Shit Up. The film documented Rodriguez's life as a conceptual artist while he ventured beyond his hometown to penetrate the international art market. The film featured various artists such as, Marina Abramović and Vito Acconci. It is set for release in 2014.

== Selected exhibitions ==
- 2011 A Meal I Make with My Mother, OHWOW, Los Angeles, California
- 2010 I'll Cross That Bridge When I Get to It, Fredric Snitzer Gallery, Miami, Florida
- 2010 The Man Called Bert, Annarumma 404, Naples, Italy
- 2009 In Your Own Image, Bass Museum of Art, Miami Beach, Florida
- 2008 Whitney Biennial, Whitney Museum of American Art, New York, New York
- 2008 Espace Experimental, Le Plateau, FRAC Île-de-France, Paris, FR
- 2008 Frieze Projects, Frieze Art Fair, London, UK

== Public collections ==
- Rubell Family Collection, Miami, Florida
- Museum of Contemporary Art, North Miami, Florida
- Kemper Museum of Art, Kansas City, Missouri
