= The Transformed Man =

Studio album by William Shatner
- Released: October 1968
- Recorded: 1968
- Genre: Spoken word
- Length: 37:08
- Label: Decca
- Producer: Don Ralke

William Shatner chronology
The Transformed Man (1968)	William Shatner Live! (1977)

Mr. Tambourine Man
Includes the final flourish

The Transformed Man is the debut album by actor William Shatner. It was originally released in 1968 by Decca Records (Cat. #DL 75043), while Shatner was still starring in the original Star Trek series, and began his musical career. The album's cover refers to Shatner as "Captain Kirk of Star Trek".

== Premise ==
Each of the first five tracks pairs Shatner reciting a monologue from a piece of classical literature (William Shakespeare is featured three times) with a spoken word interpretation of a contemporary pop song, with either section intended to complement the other thematically. The closing title track is an entirely original composition. Shatner is accompanied on the album by dramatic orchestration and, occasionally, backing vocalists.

In the decades since its release, most of the album's tracks (particularly the song lyric readings) have been used satirically, either on compilation albums meant to showcase bad celebrity singing (the Rhino Records "Golden Throats" series) or by radio disc jockeys looking for laughs.

== Critical reception ==
Professional ratings
Review scores
Source	Rating
AllMusic	4.5/5 stars
Encyclopedia of Popular Music	1/5 stars

In a retrospective review in 2011, Greg Prato of music database website AllMusic rated The Transformed Man four-and-a-half out of a possible five stars, although with serious reservations. He stated that when listening to the album, "it's unclear if Shatner is merely having a good time and goofing around, or if he's embarrassingly dead serious, and creating an overly indulgent work. Most of the album turns out to be a bit too tedious..." He also noted that "you cannot tell if Shatner is play-acting or painfully serious. The result is a must hear, (unintentional?) comedy classic," comparing this attraction to that of comedian Andy Kaufman.

In 2000, the album was voted number 3 in the All-Time Worst Albums Ever Made from Colin Larkin's All Time Top 1000 Albums. In 2006, Q magazine ranked it No. 45 in their list of the 50 worst albums ever. In 2016, the website Alternative Nation crowned the album number 1 on a "Top 10 Musical Oddities" list.

== Track listing ==
No.	Title	Writer(s)	Length
1.	"King Henry the Fifth/Elegy for the Brave"	William Shakespeare · Don Ralke · Frank Davenport	6:16
2.	"Theme from Cyrano/Mr. Tambourine Man"	Edmond Rostand · Music by Don Ralke, Translation by Frank Davenport · Bob Dylan	6:49
3.	"Hamlet/It Was a Very Good Year"	William Shakespeare · Don Ralke · Ervin Drake	7:45
4.	"Romeo and Juliet/How Insensitive (Insensatez)"	William Shakespeare · Don Ralke · Antônio Carlos Jobim, Vinícius de Moraes, English lyrics by Norman Gimbel	6:46
5.	"Spleen/Lucy in the Sky with Diamonds"	Music by Don Ralke, Words and Translation by Frank Davenport · John Lennon, Paul McCartney	5:54
6.	"The Transformed Man"	Frank Davenport, Don Ralke	3:38

Because Shakespeare's and Rostand's work had lapsed into the public domain at the time of the recording, they are not credited on the album.

== Personnel ==
- Don Ralke – producer
- Erick Labson – mastering
- Charles Bud Dant – executive producer
- Frank Davenport – English translation (poems)
- Ryan Null – photo research (reissue)
- Mike Ragogna – reissue producer
- William Shatner – liner notes

== See also ==
- "The Ballad of Bilbo Baggins"
