= Online Nation =

Television series

- Starring: Rhett and Link; Stevie Ryan; Joy Leslie
- Country of origin: United States
- No. of seasons: 1
- No. of episodes: 4

Production
- Executive producers: David Hurwitz; Paul Cockerill
- Running time: 30 minutes
- Production companies: Room 403 Productions; Warner Horizon Television; Magic Molehill

Original release
- Network: The CW
- Release: September 23 – October 14, 2007

Online Nation is an American reality television series that premiered on The CW on September 23, 2007. Scouring the endless number of websites, blogs, and user-generated materials on the internet, Online Nation featured everything and anything that has captured the attention of the online world. In addition, viewers were supposed to be able to communicate with each other live on the air. However, this function was never available, even though in the original promo for the show, it showed the capability. The show was produced by Room 403 Productions, Warner Horizon Television and Magic Molehill.

The show premiered on September 23 with what was then the lowest ratings in the network's history, which could be blamed on the program being in one of the network's worst time slots and the network's lax promotion of the series. Only 994,000 viewers caught the premiere of the show.

On October 17, 2007, The CW canceled Online Nation, making it the second show to be canceled in the 2007–2008 television season. Eight episodes were produced, but only four aired.

The comedic duo who hosted the show, Rhett and Link, responded quickly to the cancellation with an internet video. They have since used the program's existence for running gags and self-deprecation in their comedy and online video careers.

Some of the videos included in the show were Chocolate Rain, Fast Food Freestyle, Ode To Zac Braff, Mac Or Pc, Hardy Har Har, Saving Plastic Ryan, and Vaczilla.

== Nielsen ratings ==
=== Weekly ratings ===
No.	Air Date	Rating	Share	18-49 (Rating/Share)	Viewers
1	September 23, 2007	0.7	1	0.3/1	994,000
2	September 30, 2007	0.5	1	0.3/1	698,000
3	October 7, 2007	0.6	1	0.3/1	762,000
4	October 14, 2007	0.4	1	0.2/1	593,000

=== Seasonal ratings ===
Seasonal ratings based on average total viewers per episode of Online Nation on The CW:

Season	Timeslot (EDT)	Series Premiere	Series Finale	TV Season	Rank	Viewers
1	Sunday, 7:30 PM	September 23, 2007	October 14, 2007	2007–2008	134/134	762,000
