= William Shatner Live =

Live album by William Shatner
- Released: 1977
- Venues: Hofstra University, Hempstead, New York
- Genre: Spoken word
- Length: 80:11
- Label: Lemli Records
- Producer: Richard Canoff

William Shatner chronology
The Transformed Man (1968)	William Shatner Live (1977)	Has Been (2004)

William Shatner Live is a live album by Canadian actor William Shatner. It was released on Lemli Records in the United States in 1977 on two discs with a gate-fold sleeve and poster.

The album contains a written introduction by Sondra Marshak and Myrna Culbreath.

Text from liner notes:

The idea of a one man show had intrigued me for a long time. It's a well known fact that the film is a director's medium and the stage belongs to the actor. Once the curtain goes up nobody yells "cut." But the one man show is the ultimate of the actor's medium and it was this thought that led me back again and again to what I could do, alone, on the stage. It would be merciless, I knew. If I were good, it would be the actor's dream-- but if it failed I would be alone. Alone up there with thousands of eyes peering at me -- opera glasses raised for a closer look, and the unasked but heavily felt question "what's he going to do?"

All this was going through my head as I learned the lines -- all this was in front of my eyes as I lay down at night -- and when the day came that I was to open at Texas A&M University I was filled with fear.

A very primitive fear -- the fear of the actor. The nightmare that all actors have from time to time is appearing naked in front of an audience -- not knowing the lines, not knowing the play -- I was living the dream.

Thirty-five hundred people awaited me expectantly; the buzz of their voices reached me backstage, the lights dimmed, the M.C. announced my name and I walked out. The spotlight hit me like a physical force and I was on -- oh muse, be with me know -- I took a breath & started to speak...

(signed) William Shatner

== Track listing ==
Side one
No.	Title	Writer(s)	Length
1.	"Earthbound – Go with Me/High Flight"	Irene Jackson	12:02
2.	"The Flight of Man/Galileo"	Bertolt Brecht	9:38

Side two
No.	Title	Writer(s)	Length
3.	"6 Ways to the Moon"	Edmond Rostand	8:12
4.	"War of the Worlds"	H.G. Wells	12:02

Side three
No.	Title	Length
5.	"The Movie" (talking about the pending Star Trek: The Motion Picture)	17:45

Side four (Short takes)
No.	Title	Length
6.	"William Shatner/Audience"	1:28
7.	"Starship's Facilities"	0:26
8.	"Peter"	4:18
9.	"Summer Spaceship"	4:20
10.	"Three-Way Alchemy – The Brain/Finale"	9:50

== Credits ==
- Arrangement on "Go with Me / High Flight", "The Flight of Man" and "War of the Worlds" – Mark Goldenberg
- Synthesizers, keyboards and programming – Jim Hirsen
- Acoustic guitars – Mark Goldenberg
- Engineering – by Bruce Ablin
- Mastering – Frank De Luna
- Writing – Susan Price Root
- Art direction – Ria Lewerke
- Photography – Moshe Brakha
- (c) and (p) 1977 Lemli Music, Inc., 760 N. La Cienega, Los Angeles, California
- Edited and assembled at Sun-West Studios, Hollywood, California
- All music recorded and mixed at Spectrum Studios, Venice, California
- Mastered at A&M Studios, Hollywood, California
- William Shatner Live presented by Jerry Tokofsky Productions, conceived by Susan Price Root and Jerry Tokofsky
- Special thanks to Marcy Shatner for spiritual and practical guidance

== See also ==
- William Shatner's musical career
