= Ann Craven =

American painter

Ann Craven (born 1961) is an American painter. Craven is known for her paintings of birds, the moon, flowers and animals, often executed with strong chromatic contrasts. In a 2006 project, she painted over 400 paintings of the moon, as seen from the roof of her New York residence.

Craven's work is included in the collection of Whitney Museum of American Art, the Museum of Modern Art, New York and the Henry Art Gallery.
