= Ray Chi =

American architect (born 1974)

Ray Chi (born 1974 in Okemos, Michigan; lives in Milwaukee, Wisconsin) is an American architect, cellist, film and video editor, and furniture designer.

He collaborated with Sarah Price and Chris Smith on the editing of the award-winning documentary American Movie. That project would lead to the collaborative creation of ZeroTV.com, a precursor to YouTube and MySpace. Other film work includes Sarah Price's Caesar's Park, The Ice Cream Social, Studying the Lie, and a documentary based on Chicago's Hubbard Street Dance Company.

Before earning a master's degree in architecture from the Southern California Institute of Architecture he studied at Harvard and the University of Michigan.

Chi has had exhibitions in New York, Los Angeles, and has a furniture line called FURNICHI, which is regarded as functional conceptual sculpture.

In 2005, he was named Artist of the Year by the city of Milwaukee.

He currently teaches at the Milwaukee Institute of Art and Design and The University of Wisconsin-Milwaukee.

As of November 2007, he had his first child, Xander.
