= Evan Gruzis =

American artist (born 1979)

Evan Gruzis is a contemporary artist born in 1979 in Milwaukee, Wisconsin, United States. He has lived and worked in Los Angeles and New York City, and, since 2012, has lived in Wisconsin with his partner, Nicole Rogers, and their child. Gruzis first became known for his vivid paintings, which have been described as "extremely flat sculptures." His work also includes elaborate installations as well as collaborations which blur the lines of curation and production. In addition to his artistic practice, Gruzis owns and operates The Heights, a collaborative restaurant in Madison, Wisconsin, and teaches painting and drawing at the School of the Art Institute of Chicago.

Gruzis earned his BFA in Painting from the University of Wisconsin, Madison in 2002 and his MFA in Combined Media from Hunter College, New York in 2008.

== Artwork ==
Gruzis uses painting, drawing, video installations, and sculpture to explore the "push and pull of imagery that is absurd but also seductive." His artwork, while often described as meticulous and crafted, also cultivates an improvisational collaboration between the work, the viewer, and their contexts. Often created with a recognizable palette which intentionally rejects earth tones, Gruzis’ work utilizes the "transcendence of synthetic colors" to explore "the fundamentals of perception and how that relates to simple stuff, like color, like the color of the inside of your eyelids." The images within the work and the objects themselves have often been referred to as intermediaries to uncharitable, subjective spaces.

Gruzis most recent work continues to explore the nature of collaboration as he increasingly focuses on “public projects, curatorial projects, [and] things that interface with the public on a greater frequency.” Condensed Matter Community, a recent experimental exhibition co-curated with Kristof Wickman, featured the work of 38 artists within the Synchrotron, a decommissioned particle accelerator in rural Wisconsin.

== Exhibitions ==
SOLO SHOWS

2019

- Evan Gruzis: Drop Shadow, Pizzuti Collection of the Columbus Museum of Art, OH

2016

- Real Feelings, The Green Gallery, Milwaukee, WI

2014

- Atavistic Zen, DUVE Berlin, Germany
- Shell Game, The Suburban, Oak Park, IL

2012

- Alpha Wave, DUVE Berlin, Berlin, DE
- Paper View, The Green Gallery, Milwaukee, WI

2013

- Strictly Method, Galerie SAKS, Geneva

2011

- Exotic Beta, The Hole Gallery, New York, NY:
- Shadow Work, Nicole Klagsbrun, New York, NY

2010

- Rough Boy, Galerie SAKS, Geneva, CH
- Dirty Black Summer Revisited, AMP Gallery, Athens, GR

2009

- Quazai, DUVE Berlin, Berlin, DE
- Touch Of Grey, The Journal Gallery, Brooklyn, NY

2008

- Dark Systems, Deitch Projects, New York, NY
- The Dusky Parlour, DUVE Berlin, Berlin, DE

GROUP SHOWS

2019

- With a Capital P: Selections by Six Painters, Elmhurst Art Museum, Elmhurst IL

2017

- American Genre: Contemporary Painting, ICA at Maine College of Art, Portland, ME
- Milwaukee Collects, The Milwaukee Art Museum, Milwaukee, W

2014

- Sha Boogie Bop, Anonymous Gallery, New York, NY
- Buying Friends: The Ryan Kortman Collection, UICA, Grand Rapids, MI
- Go With The Flow, The Hole, New York, NY

2013

- A Study In Midwest Appropriation, Hyde Park Art Center, Chicago, IL
- Current Tendencies III, The Haggerty Museum of Art, Milwaukee, WI
- XSTRACTION, The Hole, New York, NY

2012

- Art On Paper 2012: The 42nd Exhibition, Weatherspoon Art Museum, Greensboro, NC
- Plantimplant, Dittrich & Schlechtriem, Berlin, Germany
- Portrait Of A Generation, The Hole, New York, NY
- Behind The Light, Pedro Cera Gallery, Lisbon, Portugal
- Casas De Empeño, Anonymous Gallery, Mexico City, Mexico

2011

- The Nightstands, Phillips De Pury and Company, New York, NY
- New York Minute, Garage Center for Contemporary Culture, Moscow, Russia

2010

- Salad Days, The Journal, Brooklyn, NY
- The Power of Selection Part 2, Western Exhibitions, Chicago, IL

2009

- New York Minute, Museo d’Arte Contemporanea Roma, Rome, Italy
- The Open, Deitch Projects, Long Island City, NY
- Black Hole, CCA Andratx, Mallorca, Spain
- Never Late Than Better, Elizabeth Foundation for the Arts, New York, NY

2008

- Mail Order Monsters, Max Wigram Gallery, London, UK
- Conceptual Figures, Deitch Projects, New York, NY
- Dark Fair, presented by the Milwaukee International, The Swiss Institute, New York, NY

2007

- Painted Objects, Harris Lieberman Gallery, New York, NY
- Famous Adults as Children, Famous Children as Adults, Monya Rowe Gallery, New York, NY
- Journal Drawings, The Journal, New York, NY

2006

- School Days, Jack Tilton Gallery, New York, NY

2004

- Happy Days are Here Again, David Zwirner Gallery, New York, NY

2002

- Man Walks Into a Room, Dumbo Arts Center, Brooklyn, NY

== Bibliography ==
MONOGRAPHS

- Gruzis, Evan. Existential Crisis: 38 Drawings & 41 Paintings. New York: Anteism. 2011.
- Gruzis, Evan, and Jaime Schwartz. Evan Gruzis, Quazai. Berlin: DUVE Berlin. 2010.
- Gruzis, Evan, Mara Hoberman and Joachim Pissarro. Dark Systems. New York: Deitch Projects. 2008.

CATALOGS

- Bartels, Dominique, Thomas Collier. American Genre: Contemporary Painting. Portland, ME: Institute of Contemporary Art. 2017. 2, 57.
- Kortman, Ryan, ed. Buying Friends: The Ryan Kortman Collection. Grand Rapids, MI: Urban Institute for Contemporary Art. 2015. 39, 100.
- Grayson, Kathy, ed. Portrait of a Generation. New York: The Hole. 2013. 52.

== Selected Collections ==
- Whitney Museum of American Art, New York, NY
- Milwaukee Art Museum, Milwaukee, WI
- Hood Museum of Art, Dartmouth College, NH
- The Hort Family Collection, New York, NY
- The Pizzuti Collection, Columbus, OH
- The Tishman-Speyer Collection, New York, NY
- The Deste Foundation Collection, Athens, Greece
- The Depart Foundation, Rome, Italy
- CCA Andraxt, Mallorca, Spain
- The Northwestern Mutual Collection
- The Soho House Group
- The Ryan Kortman Collection
