= What What (In the Butt) =

2007 American music video

- Written by: Bobby Ciraldo; Andrew Swant; Samwell
- Directed by: Bobby Ciraldo; Andrew Swant
- Starring: Samwell
- Music by: Mike Stasny; Samwell
- Country of origin: United States
- Original language: English

Production
- Producers: Bobby Ciraldo; Andrew Swant
- Running time: 3:49

Original release
- Release: February 14, 2007

Related
- "Protect Respect"

"What What (In the Butt)" is a viral video created by Andrew Swant and Bobby Ciraldo for the song of the same name by Samwell. It is known for its numerous blatant and camp references to homosexuality and anal sex. The lyrics of the song, a production of Mike Stasny, mostly revolve around the title. The video was made in Milwaukee, Wisconsin, and uploaded on Valentine's Day 2007 to YouTube. As of November 2023, the video has over 75 million views.

== Themes and imagery ==
On 5 March 2007, with regard to the Christian imagery in the video, Samwell said, in an interview with KROQ-FM, that the opening image is "not a cross, but a flaming symbol that [he] just happened to use". According to Stasny, however:

"[Samwell] wanted it because he's a Christian but he doesn't do Christian morality. For him, having a burning cross is a way to pay respect to his beliefs."

The video also parodies the flower petal scene from the movie American Beauty (1999).

On April 8, 2007, Brownmark Films released an interview with Samwell, in which he discussed the public reception of the song at length.

== Performances and appearances ==
In April 2008, Samwell appeared on the BBC television show Lily Allen and Friends for an interview and performed a live version of "What What (In the Butt)" with choreographed dancers. The video was also featured in episode #53 of ADD-TV in Manhattan. "What What (In the Butt)" was an official selection at the Milwaukee International Film Festival and the Mix Brasil Film Festival.

In June 2010 Samwell appeared on an episode of Comedy Central's Tosh.0, television show about viral videos. The segment told the story of how the "What What" video was created, followed by an acoustic duet version of the song by Samwell and Josh Homme, lead singer for Queens of the Stone Age and former guitar player for Kyuss.

In 2009, the creators of the video, and Samwell himself, claimed that a feature film called What What (In the Butt): The Movie was in the works.

On November 12, 2010, Brownmark Films filed a copyright infringement lawsuit against MTV Networks, South Park Studios, and Viacom for their use of "What What in the Butt" in the 2008 South Park episode "Canada on Strike". In July 2011, a federal judge decided that South Park's use of the video fell under the fair use exception to copyright law, and thus the defendants did not owe damages. The decision was unusual in a copyright lawsuit because it was made on a motion to dismiss, before summary judgment. The appeal was dismissed by the Seventh Circuit Court of Appeals on June 7, 2012. Additionally, the district court awarded attorneys' fees to the defendants because the lawsuit was "objectively unreasonable".

In January 2013, a behind-the-scenes video was released which showed footage from the original 2006 green screen shoot.

== See also ==
- LGBT hip hop
- "In the Bush"
