= Samwell (entertainer) =

American singer-songwriter

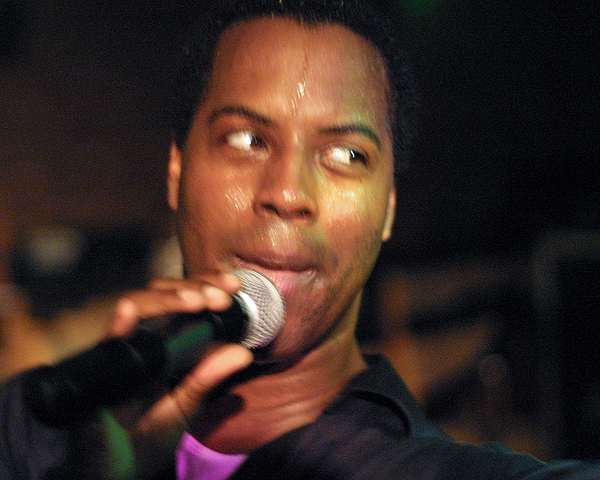
- Samwell in 2007

Background information
- Born: Samuel Johnson; May 4, 1979 (age 47); Greenville, South Carolina, United States
- Origin: Chicago, Illinois
- Website: OfficialSamwell.com

Samuel Johnson, better known by his stage name Samwell, is an American entertainer whose 2007 video "What What (In the Butt)" made him an Internet celebrity.

== Early years ==
Samwell was born in Greenville, South Carolina. He grew up in Roper, North Carolina, and attended two colleges to study history and political science. He has an undergraduate degree and studied theatre and dance from the University of North Carolina at Greensboro.

== Career ==
Samwell is unsigned, but for a time his "What What (In the Butt)" was licensed through Fatboy Slim's record label, Southern Fried Records. The "What What (In the Butt)" video is licensed through Brownmark Films.

The song was used extensively in the South Park episode "Canada on Strike", which featured a re-creation of the What What video. In April 2008, Samwell appeared on the BBC television show Lily Allen and Friends for an interview and performed a live version of "What What (In the Butt)" with choreographed dancers.

Samwell played Adonis in the 2009 feature film Modus Operandi and plays the Communications Officer in 2014's Hamlet A.D.D..

In March 2010, Special Entertainment released an iPhone App called Shaky Advice from Samwell that functions much like a Magic 8 Ball, featuring video clips of Samwell giving advice.

In June 2010, Samwell appeared on an episode of Comedy Central's Tosh.0, a television show about viral videos. The segment told the story of how the "What What" video was created, followed by an acoustic duet version of the song by Samwell and Josh Homme, lead singer for Queens Of The Stone Age and Them Crooked Vultures. In a June 2 interview, host Daniel Tosh called Samwell one of the best guests he's had on the show, saying, "I'll tell you who I loved the 'What What In The Butt' guy. It couldn't have been more of a delight." In September 2010, Samwell appeared on Tosh.0 a second time when he was nominated for the Season Two MVP Award.

Samwell has a live phone call service called Special Greetings from Samwell which is available through his official website.

Samwell released a string of videos after What What (In the Butt), including a Safe Sex PSA called Protect Respect, music videos, interview videos, and a number of comedic sketch videos.

As of 2025, he was working as a flight attendant and was an artist and comedian based in Chicago.

== See also ==
- List of YouTube personalities
