= Tay Zonday =

American YouTube personality

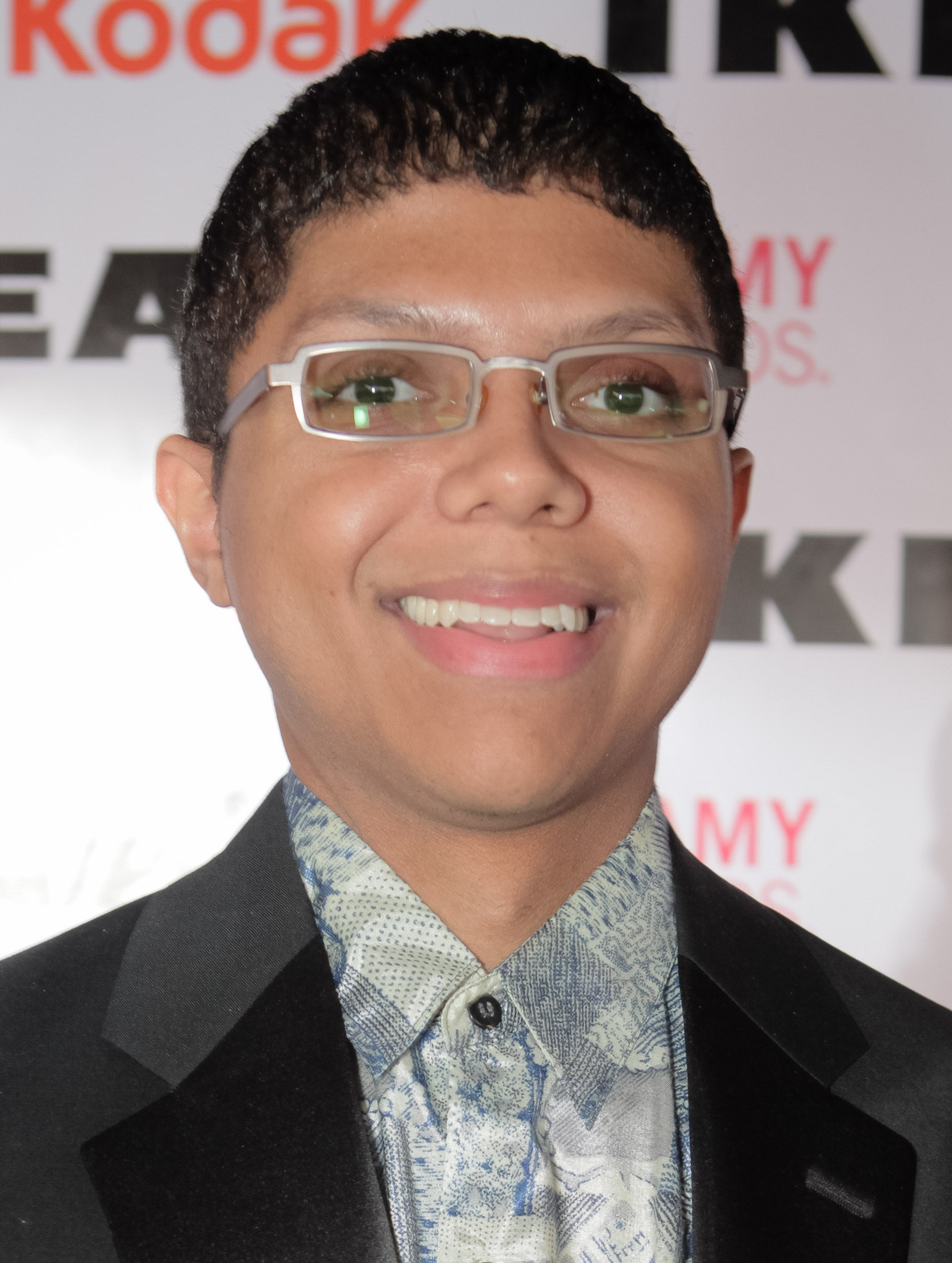
- Zonday in 2010

Background information
- Born: Adam Nyerere Bahner; May 21, 1982 (age 44); Chicago, Illinois, U.S.
- Genres: Outsider music; electronica; R&B; art pop; spoken word
- Occupations: YouTube personality, singer, songwriter, voice actor
- Years active: 2006–present
- Website: tayzonday.com

Adam Nyerere Bahner (born May 21, 1982), known professionally as Tay Zonday or as "Chocolate Rain Guy", is an American YouTube personality, singer-songwriter, and voice actor. He is known for his bass singing voice.

Zonday garnered mainstream exposure when his song "Chocolate Rain" became a viral video and Internet meme in July 2007. As of November 2026, "Chocolate Rain" has 143.7 million views on YouTube.

== Early life ==
Zonday was born Adam Nyerere Bahner in Chicago, Illinois, to an African-American mother and a Caucasian father. He is the youngest of three children, and his parents were both teachers. He attended the Illinois Mathematics and Science Academy, a residential public school for highly gifted students, and dropped out before graduating. He later graduated from Evergreen State College in 2004. Zonday is autistic, having been diagnosed as high-functioning in 1997, at age 15.

Zonday enrolled in the University of Minnesota American Studies PhD program in 2004, studying the history of theater and social change, with the intention of becoming a professor. After the viral success of "Chocolate Rain", he left university with a master's degree in 2008 and moved to Los Angeles, California. He used a stage name because he wanted a separation between his academic and entertainment career. Bahner chose "Tay Zonday" because he thought it was catchy and nobody had claimed the name yet, according to a Google search.

== Career ==
While a Ph.D. student in American studies at the University of Minnesota, Zonday began performing at open mic nights in 2006. Looking for more feedback, he began uploading his performances online the next year.

=== "Chocolate Rain" ===
Zonday released "Chocolate Rain", a viral song on race and race politics, on April 22, 2007. He was soon making appearances on national television. He appeared on G4TV's Attack of the Show!, VH1's Best Week Ever, Lily Allen and Friends, Jimmy Kimmel Live!, Tosh.0 and Maury where he performed "Chocolate Rain" on national television a little over three months after he posted his composition on YouTube. He made the front page of Sunday's Los Angeles Times on August 12, 2007, with additional features in The Toronto Star, The Chicago Tribune's RedEye, The Star Tribune and People and has appeared on CNN for a televised interview. On February 12, 2008, he appeared on the television show Lily Allen and Friends on BBC Three, and performed a cover of Lily Allen's debut "Smile". In March 2008, the video won a YouTube award in the category "Music".

The Australian Daily Telegraph newspaper wrote: "Tay Zonday has written perhaps the most listened-to song in the world right now". People said: "He's scored a YouTube hit with his repetitive, keyboard-driven 'Chocolate Rain', and after a recent appearance on Jimmy Kimmel Live, Tay Zonday's star is shining even brighter". The article also noted that celebrity musicians paid tribute to the song as its popularity rapidly peaked in August 2007. John Mayer reportedly copied Zonday's keyboard riff with his guitar in concert, along with appearing on Best Week Ever improvising a parody to the tune of Nelly Furtado's "Say It Right". Green Day drummer Tré Cool recorded a parody of "Chocolate Rain" which he posted on YouTube. Zonday also became the subject of thousands of other parodies and remixes on YouTube. A clip of his video was also shown on The CW's short-lived series, Online Nation. Zonday has also been interviewed twice on Good Morning America, in March and November 2008.

Zonday starred in a commercial for Comedy Central's "Last Laugh 07", hosted by Lewis Black. He released a video called "Cherry Chocolate Rain", in a promotion with Dr Pepper. He starred alongside Leslie Hall in a commercial for Firefox web browser singing a song called "Users Against Boredom" in a parody of "We Are the World". Zonday has said that his voice is often compared to Paul Robeson, Barry White, James Earl Jones, and Brad Roberts of the Crash Test Dummies. He appeared in-person at Intel's Consumer Electronics Show booth, rendering the source files of the "Chocolate Rain" YouTube video in Sony Vegas.

=== After "Chocolate Rain" ===
In February 2010, he cameoed in a Vizio Super Bowl commercial opened by Beyoncé.

In August 2011, Zonday released his only EP so far, titled "Chocolate Rain 2.0". In November he uploaded "Mama Economy (The Economy Explained)" in response to an economic crisis in the United States. "Mama Economy" features Lindsey Stirling playing the violin.

On June 22, 2012, Zonday uploaded a cover of Carly Rae Jepsen's number one single "Call Me Maybe", which as of 2022 has reached over 6.7 million views. It was featured on "The 10 Best 'Call Me Maybe' Covers" on Billboard.com. He is seen performing the single in front of a microphone in what he claimed to be "as low as I could [sing]".

In June 13, 2026, Zonday appeared as one of the participants in MrBeast's video 50 YouTube Legends Fight For $1,000,000, where he took part in a Harlem Shake mannequin identification challenge and was called out by name during the segment.

=== Voice acting ===
Zonday voiced "The King" in the Happy Wheels animated web series based on the video game of the same name, which premiered on go90 in November 2016.

In July 2017, Machinima, Inc. and Hasbro cast several YouTube personalities, including Zonday, for the animated web series Transformers: Titans Return to garner online attention. Zonday was cast as "Chorus of the Primes".

== See also ==
- List of YouTubers
