= WEZY (FM) =

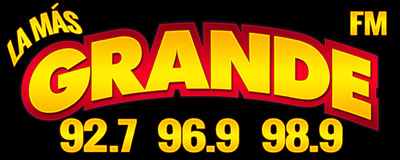
- Kewaunee, Wisconsin; United States
- Broadcast area: Green Bay, Wisconsin
- Frequency: 92.7 MHz
- Branding: La Más Grande

Programming
- Format: Regional Mexican
- Affiliations: AP Radio

Ownership
- Owner: Magnum Broadcasting Inc.

History
- First air date: 1973
- Former call signs: WAUN (1973–1979); WAUN-FM (1979–2022); WYZM (2022–2023); WCFW (2023)

Technical information
- Licensing authority: FCC
- Facility ID: 26006
- Class: A
- ERP: 6,000 watts
- HAAT: 100 meters (330 ft)
- Transmitter coordinates: 44°29′50″N 87°35′12″W
- Repeaters: 96.9 W245BS (Green Bay); 98.9 W255AQ (Sturgeon Bay)

Links
- Public license information: Public file; LMS
- Website: lamasgrandegb.com

WEZY (92.7 FM, "La Más Grande") is a Regional Mexican radio station licensed to Kewaunee, Wisconsin, that serves the Green Bay area. The station is owned by Magnum Broadcasting.

WEZY's main signal can be heard from Sturgeon Bay, where the station's main office is located, south to Manitowoc and west to the Green Bay metropolitan area. WEZY also broadcasts over two translator stations, W245BS 96.9 FM in Green Bay and W255AQ 98.9 FM in Sturgeon Bay. Both translators are owned by Del Reynolds. The Green Bay translator formerly aired on 97.3 as W247AC but was pushed to 96.9 after WTAQ-FM signed on at 97.5.

== History ==
Prior to adopting its former smooth jazz format, the then-WAUN-FM aired a satellite-fed classic hits format from Jones Radio Networks, branded as "U-Rock". Prior to that it was an FM talk station and, during much of the 1980s and 1990s, it aired various country formats, including hot country and polka known as "Moo 92". The station originally was put on the air by Harbor Cities Broadcasting, with a polka format, mostly in monophonic, for several decades, prior to the death of its main stockholder and engineer Andy Brusda. Subsequent management failures caused the station to incur massive debt to the IRS, and the sale of the station to Magnum apparently stopped the mounting debtload and liability.

WAUN-FM changed from Broadcast Architecture's Smooth Jazz Network to the Smooth AC Network in September 2010. The smooth AC format is an adult contemporary format which mixes in a few smooth jazz instrumentals per hour, and returned an AC format to the Green Bay area following the switch of WROE (94.3 FM) and WRQE (99.7 FM) to a classic hits format earlier in September 2010. By the summer of 2012, however, the Smooth AC programming was dropped and the station was again airing the Smooth Jazz Network.

On March 25, 2013, the station flipped from "Smooth Bays" to a Regional Mexican format as "La Más Grande," bringing the first Spanish language radio station to the Green Bay area, although 105.7 WAPL carries Spanish programming on a subcarrier.

On November 8, 2022, WAUN-FM changed its call sign to WYZM. On February 20, 2023, the station changed its call sign again, to WCFW. It then became WEZY on May 14, 2023.
