= Lily Allen and Friends =

Television series

- Genre: Talk show
- Presented by: Lily Allen
- Country of origin: United Kingdom
- Original language: English
- No. of series: 1
- No. of episodes: 8

Production
- Editor: Karl Warner
- Running time: 45 minutes
- Production company: Princess Productions

Original release
- Network: BBC Three
- Release: 12 February – 1 April 2008

Lily Allen and Friends was a British TV talk show presented by Lily Allen. The programme was produced by Princess Productions for BBC Three. It was first shown on 12 February 2008.

The audience consists entirely of Lily's online friends, who sign up via the programme's website. Guests include celebrities, topical guests from the online world, chart-topping bands and lesser known acts chosen by the public. Also each week a member of the public has a chance to record a question for either of that week's guest along with an internet celebrity and a character known only as "Mary, the foul-mouthed grandma". Internet correspondents posed questions for the celebrities.

== Host ==
The show was hosted by Lily Allen. Lily Allen and Friends was Allen's first venture into television presenting.

== Format ==
The show was filmed at Pinewood Studios. The programme features a video diary of Lily's life outside the programme and a section titled weird and wonderful, highlighting internet videos in the YouTube Hero and Myspace Band items.

== Reception ==
The BBC was criticised by several teacher unions for a video aired during the 18 March episode, which apparently showed a student running up from behind and pulling down his teacher's trousers. The unions said airing this clip was irresponsible and greatly added to the teacher's embarrassment. While introducing the clip, Allen called it kegging and said, "It's very childish, but very funny".

As the tickets are simply distributed by an online ticket agency, which anyone can apply for in an identical way to other TV shows, there was comment passed on whether the statement "the audience consists entirely of Lily's online friends" was valid.

It was reported that during an interview with Paddy McGuinness, Allen exposed her breast to the audience for three minutes.

== Episode guide ==
Pilot	Original airdate	Guests	Musical Guest/Song performed	YouTube Hero	MySpace Band
—	January 2008	Alan Davies, Alex James	Alphabeat	—	—
1	12 February 2008	Cuba Gooding, Jr., David Mitchell	Reverend and the Makers ("The State of Things")	Tay Zonday	The Metros
2	19 February 2008	Martin Freeman, Lee Mack	Adele ("Chasing Pavements")	The Syncsta Boys	Kids in Glass Houses
3	26 February 2008	Ben Miller, Lacey Turner	Mark Ronson ("Just")	Britney Houston	Yelle
4	4 March 2008	Annie Mac, Louis Walsh, Claudia Winkleman	The Charlatans ("Oh! Vanity")	Greg Pattillo	The Whip
5	11 March 2008	James Corden, Joe Dempsie, Mitch Hewer	Róisín Murphy ("You Know Me Better")	John and Michelle Brubaker	Look See Proof
6	18 March 2008	Phill Jupitus, Jermain Defoe, Roxanne McKee, Jennifer Metcalfe	Guillemots ("Get Over It")	Breakdancing Baby	Malakai
7	25 March 2008	Lauren Laverne, Joanna Page, Paddy McGuinness	The Futureheads ("The Beginning of the Twist")	BeardyMan	Underground Heroes
8	1 April 2008	Robert Webb, Alesha Dixon, Danny Dyer	One Night Only ("It's About Time")	Samwell	Metronomy

== See also ==
- Lily Allen
- MySpace
