= Marbella International Film Festival =

Annual film festival in Spain

- Location: Marbella, Spain
- Founded: 2006
- Language: International
- Website: www.marbellafilmfestival.com

The Marbella International Film Festival (Festival Internacional de Cine de Marbella) has been held in Marbella on the Costa del Sol in Spain since 2006. It provides a venue for encouraging artists from all parts of the world.

The festival was started by the New World Trust, a non-profit organization.

The festival includes an "Art at the Fringe" program where artists in other media may display their work, including sculpture, photographs, fashion, jewelry and performance arts.

The festival director is Mac Chakaveh

== Awardees and selections ==
The award is given each year for significant movies and people in a variety of categories. Selected movies are each year some less out of several hundred applications.

=== 2023 ===
- Selected short Annie Pannie
- Selected short Starship Troopers Deadlock
- Selected short Dragunov

=== 2022 ===
- Secrets as best feature
- 25 Years of UK Garage as best documentary
- Pouchka as best short film
