= David Robbins (artist) =

American artist and writer (born 1957)

David Robbins (born 1957 in Whitefish Bay, Wisconsin) is an American artist and writer who was one of the first to investigate the art world's entrance into the culture industry.

For three decades, in artworks and writing David Robbins has promoted a frank, unapologetic recognition of the contemporary overlap between the art and entertainment contexts. His work Talent, eighteen "entertainer's headshots" of contemporary artists including Cindy Sherman, Jeff Koons, Jenny Holzer, Allan McCollum and others, is widely credited with announcing the age of the celebrity artist, and The Ice Cream Social (1993–2008), a multi-platform project comprising a TV pilot for the Sundance Channel, a novella, installations, ceramics, and performance, has been cited by curator Hans Ulrich Obrist as pioneering the "expanded exhibition." In its totality The Ice Cream Social represents an emphatically American version of some of the exhibition strategies employed by artists associated with relational aesthetics. His work is in many museum collections including the Metropolitan Museum of Art and the Whitney Museum, New York, MAMCO, Geneva, and Moderna Museet, Stockholm.

Progressively evolving away from the prevailing model of the professional contemporary artist, in his books High Entertainment (2009) and Concrete Comedy: An Alternative History of Twentieth-Century Comedy (2011) he identified and advanced other categories of imaginative endeavor. In 2000 he withdrew from active participation in the art world in order to discover how his imagination performed when not formatted to produce art, and began using the term "independent imagination" in place of "artist." Subsequently, relocating to Milwaukee he aligned his work with contexts and formats historically forsaken by the avant garde, positing the suburb as a frontier for art production and creating TV commercials for galleries. In 2016 he produced "Theme Song For An Exhibition," a pop song created with musicians Evan Gruzis, Nicole Rogers, and Richard Galling, which was launched simultaneously on the websites of eleven museums, including the Serpentine, London, and the Hammer, Los Angeles.

== Career ==
After attending Brown University, Robbins was employed in the early 1980s by Andy Warhol, George Plimpton, and Diana Vreeland, during which years he educated himself about art by interviewing emerging artists such as Richard Prince, Jenny Holzer, Keith Haring, and Allan McCollum. Robbins began exhibiting his art in the mid-1980s in New York, where he was closely associated with the neo-conceptual Gallery Nature Morte.

In contrast to the Pictures generation (his immediate predecessors who maintained a critical distance from the mass advertising and entertainment imagery that fascinated them), Robbins pioneered an approach to art that unapologetically embraced entertainment culture. His first solo exhibition, The David Robbins Show (1986) featured "guest" collaborators such as Richard Prince, Clegg & Guttman, and Jennifer Bolande. He gained wider recognition for photographic works such as Talent and The Art Dealers' Optical Tests (1987), which treated the art context as material for comedy. He actively promoted what he termed the "comic object"—an object made with sophisticated comic rather than aesthetic intent. In later works such as The German Reunification Public Sculpture Competition (1991) and The Ice Cream Social (1993–2008), Robbins looked at political content through a comic lens. In other works of the same period, such as the Situation Comedies (1994–2003), he emptied his comedy of all narrative and topicality, creating objects that explored comedy as a subject in itself.

Robbins is also known for the theory and practice of what he refers to as "alternatives to art." Concrete Comedy is his term for a kind of non-fiction comedy of objects and gestures that surfaced in the early decades of the 20th century, first evidenced in the work of German comedian Karl Valentin and French artist Marcel Duchamp, and was subsequently recurringly manifested culture-wide, in fashion, architecture, music, film, television, art, advertising, and design. In November 2006 Robbins' "Concrete Comedy" essay appeared in Artforum magazine. From 1996 to 2006 he taught a course in the subject at The School of The Art Institute of Chicago, during which period he wrote Concrete Comedy: An Alternative History to Twentieth-Century Comedy, the first comprehensive consideration of materialist comedy. The book was published in 2011 by Pork Salad Press. His other "alternative to art," known as High Entertainment, argues for a category of imaginative production that balances art's emphasis on form-discovery with entertainment's emphasis on accessibility. Born of the new production and distribution opportunities of the digital era, High Entertainment encourages the "independent imagination" to apply art's experimentalism to mainstream forms such as commercial film and television.

== Writing ==
Robbins was an early contributor to REALLIFE Magazine, Purple magazine, and Art issues. His books include Concrete Comedy; The Velvet Grind: Essays, Interviews, Satires 1983–2005, which collect several of his early interviews; a novella, The Ice Cream Social; High Entertainment; The Dr. Frankenstein Option; Foundation Papers from the Archives of the Institute for Advanced Comedic Behavior; and The Camera Believes Everything. In 2020 Accrochage, three scripts combined to make a single narrative arc and formatted as a book, was published in Berlin.

== Video work ==
Video work includes Lift (2006), which screened at the New York Video Festival; The Ice Cream Social (2004), winner of the Sundance TV Lab competition; and Something Theater (2009–present), a broadcast television show created with Bobby Ciraldo and Andrew Swant. Since 2010 he has made television commercials for art exhibitions and galleries, occasionally purchasing time on broadcast TV to air them. His video Concrete Comedy: An Introduction premiered in 2014 as part of MOCAtv's Art + Comedy channel. That same year he created TV Family, a television show in Italian, for Museo MADRE in Naples, Italy.
