= Scott Reeder (artist) =

American painter

Scott Reeder (born 1970, Battle Creek, MI) is a multi-disciplinary artist in Chicago, IL. He is currently represented by Canada in New York, NY and Kavi Gupta in Chicago, IL.

== Biography ==
Reeder is currently an associate professor of painting and drawing at the School of the Art Institute of Chicago. Reeder is best known for his irreverent take on modernism and memorable titles like 'Money in Bed' and 'Symmetrical Pirate.' A book of his Reeder's work, Scott Reeder: Ideas (cont.) was published by Mousse Publishing in 2019.

In 2002, with his brother Tyson Reeder, they established the storefront gallery General Store in Milwaukee, Wisconsin. General Store curated the exhibitions Drunk vs. Stoned (2004) and Drunk vs. Stoned 2 (2005) at Gavin Brown’s Enterprise, New York, and The Early Show (2005) at White Columns, New York. The Reeders also organized the Dark Fair, an art fair operated in a black-walled space lit only with candlelight, at the Swiss Institute Contemporary Art New York in 2008 and as part of Art Cologne in 2009. Scott and Tyson Reeder additionally operate Club Nutz, billed as the world’s smallest comedy club. First established in a small 8’ x 8’ room adjacent to the Green Gallery in Milwaukee, Club Nutz has traveled to the Frieze Art Fair in London, the Museum of Contemporary Art Chicago, and Salon 94 in New York to host open-mics, dance parties, screenings, and lectures.

== Film ==
In 2014, he debuted his first feature-length film, Moon Dust, shot over the span of eleven years.
