= List of Tosh.0 episodes =

This is a list of episodes of the American television series Tosh.0.

== Series overview ==
Season	Episodes	Originally released	
Season	Episodes	First released	Last released
1	16	June 4, 2009	November 12, 2009
2	25	January 13, 2010	September 29, 2010
3	30	January 11, 2011	November 15, 2011
4	30	January 31, 2012	December 4, 2012
5	30	February 5, 2013	December 10, 2013
6	30	February 18, 2014	December 2, 2014
7	30	February 17, 2015	December 1, 2015
8	30	February 9, 2016	November 29, 2016
9	30	February 7, 2017	November 21, 2017
10	20	March 27, 2018	November 20, 2018
11	20	March 19, 2019	November 19, 2019
12	10	September 15, 2020	November 24, 2020

== Episodes ==
=== Season 1 (2009) ===
No. overall	No. in season	Title	Original release date
1	1	"Afro Ninja"	June 4, 2009
Crush video of a woman with fat feet crushing inanimate objects. Adam Kepler also shows up for hugs and kisses Kato Kaelin mocking Charlie Schmidt's Keyboard Cat. Web Redemption for Afro Ninja Mark Allen Hicks who had problems with his backflip while auditioning for a Nike commercial.; Daniel's Extreme Salvia Challenge which involves Daniel attempting the Saltine cracker challenge and the cinnamon challenge, while on Salvia, after which he attempts to crack 100 coconuts, all in under one minute; Dave Attell and Bree Olson play beer pong. Video of man unable to break any nuts in an attempt to break a record on breaking coconuts that first aired on Aftenshowet on DR1 in Denmark. Unfortunate domain of the week: nig.com (Royal Bank of Scotland Group subsidiary National Insurance and Guarantee Corporation). Fashion Theme: Hoodies
2	2	"Miss Teen South Carolina"	June 11, 2009
Web Redemption for Miss Teen South Carolina; David Koechner celebrity video. Fashion Theme: Hoodies
3	3	"News Puke Kid"	June 18, 2009
Web Redemption for the News Puke kid Tyrone Davies who vomited down his pants on live television while promoting Ragtag Cinema on KMIZ during the 6 a.m. news.; Fred Willard celebrity video. Fashion Theme: Hoodies
4	4	"Take a Tumble"	June 25, 2009
Web Redemption for Scarlet Takes a Tumble; Terrell Owens celebrity video. Fashion Theme: Hoodies
5	5	"Chris Crocker"	July 9, 2009
Web Redemption for Chris Crocker; Asians' Christopher Walken impressions; Andy Dick celebrity video. Fashion Theme: Hoodies
6	6	"Balloon Guy Bill"	July 16, 2009
Web Redemption for Balloon Guy Bill Monroe; Jack McBrayer celebrity video; Bill Cosby impressions by white girls. Fashion Theme: Hoodies
7	7	"Worst Best Man"	July 23, 2009
Web Redemption for a bad best man; lunch with Harland Williams; Daniel's admits the truth about tweets saying Daniel gets down on his dog. Fashion Theme: Hoodies
8	8	"Why Must I Cry?"	July 30, 2009
Web Redemption for rapper Reh Dogg's "Why Must I Cry"; Kristin Cavallari's celebrity video. Fashion Theme: Hoodies
9	9	"Dizzy Dunk"	August 6, 2009
Web Redemption for Drunk basketball dunker; Daniel's Popcorn Challenge; Tommy Chong in "Weed vs. Salvia". Hilarious ;0 Winner of the Reh Dogg Greenscreen Remix Challenge announced. Fashion Theme: Hoodies
10	10	"Skateboard Girl"	August 13, 2009
Web Redemption for girl who falls off skateboard; responses to the Popcorn Challenge. The season's best moments (Shortest show on Comedy Central). Fashion Theme: Hoodies
11	11	"Tron Guy"	October 8, 2009
Web Redemption for Tron Guy; an interview with YouTube phenom Fred Fashion Theme: Cardigans
12	12	"Backyard Wrestler"	October 15, 2009
Web Redemption for Backyard Wrestler, wrestles Nathan in this episode; Daniel goes to Adultcon to teach porn stars about Q-tip fetishes. Fashion Theme: Cardigans
13	13	"Crying Giants Fan"	October 22, 2009
Web Redemption for Crying Giants Fan; David Letterman-inspired flash mob. Fashion Theme: Cardigans
14	14	"N64 Kid"	October 29, 2009
Web Redemption for the N64 Kid; Adventures in in-line skating. Fashion Theme: Cardigans
15	15	"Trampled Cheerleader"	November 5, 2009
Web Redemption for Cali Kait Schmidt of Auburn Senior High School who was trampled by a football team when she tried to adjust a banner for the team to run through in October 2007. Tosh answers to Twitter questions about celebrities Fashion Theme: Cardigans
16	16	"Ladder Fail Guy"	November 12, 2009
Web Redemption for QVC guy on a ladder in which Daniel claims that he experimented once with Women; Arm wrestling while tosh shows the audience how to do the macarana wearing a sombrero and taking shots of whiskey. Fashion Theme: Cardigans

=== Season 2 (2010) ===
No. overall	No. in season	Title	Original release date	Viewers (millions)
17	1	"David After The Dentist"	January 13, 2010	N/A
Web Redemption for David After Dentist featuring comedian Jimmy Pardo. Daniel arm-wrestles David Mendenhall, who played Sylvester Stallone's son Michael Hawk in the 1987 film Over the Top. Daniel teases the audience with a blacked version of "the blob" which is a result of six years of injecting silicone into his penis. Daniel discusses selling a cardigan sweater on eBay for $523, meaning his celebrity is $334 more valuable. Daniel also attempts to break the world record for most balls rolled over in sequence, in the new segment called, "I'm Better Than You. Na Na Na Boo-boo, Stick Your Head in Doo-doo.", and plays "Is it racist?" in a video of a boy spelling Negus in a spelling bee. Fashion Theme: Casual Jackets
18	2	"Crystal Light Dancers (Reunion)"	January 20, 2010	N/A
Web Reunion with the Crystal Light dancers after 23 years. The reunion involves an appearance by Alan Thicke who originally hosted them. Bill Allen recreates his role as Cruz Jones in the 1986 film Rad, in which he brings Daniel to the reunion on a bicycle. Daniel web chats with Wii Fit girl. Fashion Theme: Casual Jackets
19	3	"Risky Business"	January 27, 2010	N/A
Web redemption for the Risky Business girls; Daniel gets his first tattoo and invites viewers to write on his Wikipedia page, which earns him #34 on the "50 Craziest Lies in Wikipedia History". Fashion Theme: Casual Jackets
20	4	"Friendly Tackle"	February 3, 2010	N/A
Web Redemption for Football Player Tackles His Teammate. Fashion Theme: Casual Jackets
21	5	"Average Homeboy"	February 10, 2010	N/A
Web Redemption for The Average Homeboy; Mel Gibson stops by for an interview; Daniel gets an iPad, and he attempts to break the world record for chair jumping and jumps rope from his hands and knees in the segment "I'm Better Than You. Na-na Na Boo-boo, Stick Your Head in Doo-doo". Fashion Theme: Casual Jackets
22	6	"Prom Girl"	February 17, 2010	N/A
Web Redemption for a prom-goer which features Ron Jeremy; Daniel's first book-club pick. Fashion Theme: Casual Jackets
23	7	"Hood Rat Kid"	February 24, 2010	N/A
Web Redemption for the "Hood Rat Kid"; Daniel joins Chatroulette; the show enters the Winter Olympics. Fashion Theme: Casual Jackets
24	8	"Crying Sorority Girl"	March 3, 2010	N/A
Web Redemption for "make it snow" girl; Epic Beard Man. Fashion Theme: Casual Jackets
25	9	"Phillies Fan"	March 10, 2010	N/A
Web redemption for the Phillies Fan's daughter. The redemption involved Steve Monforto and his 3-year-old daughter Emily following a video of Steve catching a foul ball and then handing it to Emily who threw it back on the field. The event took place on September 16, 2009, at Citizens Bank Park during a game between the Philadelphia Phillies and the Washington Nationals. Fashion Theme: Casual Jackets
26	10	"The LARPer"	June 2, 2010	1.90
Web Redemption for a LARPer, known for his "lightning bolts"; a marijuana convention in Los Angeles. Fashion Theme: Deep V's
27	11	"Look at This Horse Guy"	June 9, 2010	1.69
Web Redemption for the "Look at that Horse Guy" on the Shop at Home network; Daniel's "I Hate" video; tweeting summer plans;. Fashion Theme: Deep V's
28	12	"What What (In the Butt) (Remix)"	June 16, 2010	1.87
Tommy Lee plays drums on several women and Daniel's breasts as he remakes the "Worst DJ Ever" video in which the emcee plays with a woman's breasts. Web Remix for Samwell from the "What What (In the Butt)" video, with musician Josh Homme; a meeting with the "I like" girl; another round of "Is It Racist?" Fashion Theme: Deep V's
29	13	"Stuck in an Elevator"	June 23, 2010	2.00
Web Redemption for guy who was stuck in an elevator; Hollywood's newest exercise craze; Daniel shows off his dirtiest dance moves. Fashion Theme: Deep V's
30	14	"Cartwheeling Goalie"	June 30, 2010	1.94
Web Redemption for the cartwheeling goalie; Amazon Amanda; Daniel gets iced. The redemption involves Hartford Hawks soccer goalkeeper Nenad Cudic that features Brandi Chastain attempting to score on him. Cudic had achieved notoriety on November 11, 2009, in a shootout with the Stony Brook Seawolves when Cudic performed cartwheels to unsuccessfully distract his opponent in a game that Hartford lost. Fashion Theme: Deep V's
31	15	"Looking for a Girlfriend"	July 7, 2010	2.41
Web Redemption for the "Looking for a girlfriend" kid. Spanish ibex goat scratching its butt with its horn. Fashion Theme: Deep V's
32	16	"WoW Freakout (Investigation)"	July 14, 2010	2.20
Web Investigation for World of Warcraft freakout kid; Daniel discusses what celebrities he could beat in a fight.Michael Winslow guest stars. Fashion Theme: Deep V's
33	17	"Worst Comedian Ever"	July 28, 2010	2.65
Web Redemption for the Worst Comedian Ever. Arsenio Hall guest stars. Fashion Theme: Deep V's
34	18	"Bad Weatherman"	August 4, 2010	2.36
Web Redemption for the awful weatherman; Daniel reunites with a long lost friend, does a spoiler alert for The Human Centipede. Fashion Theme: Deep V's
35	19	"Peter Pan Girls"	August 11, 2010	1.95
Web Redemption for the Peter Pan Fail girls. Daniel lathers a buff Carrot Top with sunscreen. Fashion Theme: Deep V's
36	20	"Angry Black Preacher"	August 18, 2010	2.41
Web Redemption Angry Black Preacher Don Vincent who had been on the Spirit of Truth Public-access television show, burns 1500 books (a kindle); Fashion Theme: Deep V's
37	21	"American Idol Girls"	August 25, 2010	2.23
Web Redemption American Idol Girls, David Archuleta Fashion Theme: Deep V's
38	22	"Double Rainbow Guy (Retreat)"	September 8, 2010	2.31
Web Retreat with the Double Rainbow Guy. In January 2010 Paul Vasquez, whose YouTube ID is HungryBear9562 posted the double rainbow video taken outside his Yosemite home. The video achieved national prominence on July 3, 2010, when Jimmy Kimmel sent a Twitter announcement about it. In this redemption, Daniel and Vasquez follow the rainbow to the West Hollywood bedroom of Perez Hilton. Daniel meets his exact opposite, "Tosh Daniel". Fashion Theme: Deep V's
39	23	"I Like Turtles Kid"	September 15, 2010	2.18
Web Redemption for the I Like Turtles kid. 10-year-old Jonathon Ware who was wearing zombie makeup at the Portland Rose Festival on May 31, 2007, became the subject of a viral video after he only said "I like turtles" when interviewed on television. In the segment "Prisoner or Million Dollar Athlete?," Daniel has the audience determine whose tattoos are whose. Among those pictured are LeBron James, David Beckham, Plaxico Burress, and Robert Gallery. October 2008 video of two-year-old boy fatally shooting his father with a 9mm military pistol during a wedding in Aleppo, Syria. Video breakdown of a Giant panda ripping the coat off a man sitting on the edge of his cage at the Chengdu Research Base of Giant Panda Breeding on November 2, 1992. Challenge "can you still look hot while taking the cinnamon challenge." Fashion Theme: Deep V's
40	24	"Reporter Who Can't Break Glass"	September 22, 2010	2.23
Web Redemption for the Reporter Who Can't Break Glass, why did you take your shirt off, Daniel tasers people, Corey Taylor makes a guest appearance, getting tased. KTVL reporter Sebastian Robertson in Medford, Oregon had problems breaking a car window in a vehicle theft. Gallagher helps in the redemption by breaking a glass window to get watermelon. Daniel parodies the Budapest 70-gigapixel photograph by showing a photograph of Los Angeles, California in which he is naked in at least two places. Fashion Theme: Deep V's
41	25	"Perfect Internet Video"	September 29, 2010	2.12
Season finale. Daniel reflects on all the lives he changed during season 2, highlights the gayest moments of the season, remembers all of the celebrity guests and reminisces on the most racist. Fashion Theme: Deep V's

=== Season 3 (2011) ===
No. overall	No. in season	Title	Original release date	Viewers (millions)
42	1	"Antoine Dodson"	January 11, 2011	3.57
Web Redemption for Antoine Dodson, new set suggestions from audience, new wardrobe ("colla"), carrot bukkake, naked hippie old woman, blowjob in the subway, Miss Pregnant pageant, man on wheelchair falls down an elevator shaft, real life Angry Bird, "Is He Retarded". Fashion Theme: Collas
43	2	"Brian Atene"	January 18, 2011	3.13
Daniel gives Brian Atene a web redemption for an audition tape for Full Metal Jacket in which Atene successfully auditions for a one-line appearance in Cougar Town as "creepy photographer." Among the videos are two men cavorting naked in the streets in Ireland on Arthur's Day. and a screaming woman jumping off a snowy Russian building on a bungee cord. Tosh parodies the Ted Williams (voice-over artist) viral video by having other homeless looking people read broadcast announcements on the street. Fashion Theme: Collas
44	3	"Ice Cream Truck Guy"	January 25, 2011	3.41
Web Redemption for Optimo 55 Souf (a.k.a. Ken Green) who had been hit by an ice cream truck in Aurora, Illinois while dancing in the street for a music video "I'm Gipper" Video breakdown of Nanaimo, British Columbia January 10, 2010, house fire in which a man being rescued acts crazy (the video went viral after being featured on Kenny vs. Spenny). Daniel takes to task a seven-year-old Wesley Ekstrand of Independence, Missouri who mocked him in a video. Fashion Theme: Collas
45	4	"National Anthem Fail Girl"	February 1, 2011	3.04
Daniel makes a Super Bowl prediction. He gives a web redemption to Natalie Gilbert, who forgot the words of the national anthem and had been prodded by Maurice Cheeks. Natalie's earlier incident occurred April 25, 2003, during a National Basketball Association playoff game between the Portland Trail Blazers and the Dallas Mavericks at Rose Garden (arena) in Portland, Oregon. She and Daniel also appeared in Honda Center in Anaheim, California, the home of the Anaheim Ducks, just before the NHL match between the Ducks and Calgary Flames. Daniel wrote and held up a sign "By the dawn's early light", "I pledge allegiance to the flag", "You're doing great, don't f**k this up!", "What the hell is a 'Rampart'?", "ram.part-noun: a protective barrier.", "Spoiler Alert: Bombs burst in air", "Hey Subaru, give me a free Outback", "God hates flags", and "Tosh 3:16" while Natalie sang the national anthem of the US. After that, Daniel rammed Natalie and screamed out, "Go, Ducks!". Fashion Theme: Collas
46	5	"Evolution of Dance Guy (Dance-Off)"	February 8, 2011	3.54
Daniel mocks Super Bowl commercial, a Web Dance-Off with the "Evolution of Dance" guy, Judson Laipply. Fashion Theme: Collas
47	6	"Crying Wrestling Fan"	February 15, 2011	2.89
Mock interview with Oprah Winfrey made up of her old clips. Crying Wrestling Fan Redemption for David Wills who was crying at the Spartanburg, South Carolina Wrestling Fanfest. The redemption involves former professional wrestlers Sgt. Slaughter, Million Dollar Man and Koko B. Ware. Todd Glass Awful Prank Show. Fashion Theme: Collas
48	7	"The Hurdle Girls (Rematch)"	February 22, 2011	3.36
Video breakdown of a robbery of a convenience store on December 28, 2010, in Manassas, Virginia by a man with a big stick with the clerk countering with a hammer. Web Rematch for Alexis Patzschke and Natasha Burns who stumbled in a video while running the hurdles in a 2006 Lafayette, Indiana track meet. The redemption involves Donkey Kong and a rematch in the "Tosh.O'lympics." Tosh tells the story line of the Matthew McConaughey's movie Tiptoes, and he and his friends run through a flaming hoop four-and-a-half times to breaking a new record in the segment "I'm Better Than You. Na-na Na Boo-boo, Stick Your Head in Doo-doo". Fashion Theme: Collas
49	8	"Foul Ball Couple"	March 1, 2011	2.60
Web redemption of girl hit in face with baseball which involves a recreation of American Gladiators with Deron McBee (one of the first season stars who went under the name "Malibu"). Sarah Saco-Vertiz had been hit in the face by a foul ball hit by Chris Johnson at Minute Maid Park during a Houston Astros game when her seatmate Bo Wyble jumped out of the way on August 9, 2010. Video of a hyena attempting to eat the anus of a dead elephant which explodes from decomposition. The segment was originally part of a segment entitled, "The Elephant: Life After Death" on Channel 4. Fashion Theme: Collas
50	9	"Phil Davison"	March 8, 2011	N/A
Web redemption for Phil Davison whose very passionate speech campaigning for Stark County, Ohio treasurer went viral. The redemption involves a recreation of Meet the Press and Davison declaring he is running for President (in a speech in front of a poster proclaiming "Nope" (mocking the Barack Obama "Hope" poster)) with Sarah Palin assassinating him with a hunting rifle. Daniel introduces a segment called kiddie porn noting that in Hollywood there is no shortage of parents who will let their children do anything for a SAG card. Fashion Theme: Collas
51	10	"Board Breaker"	March 15, 2011	3.33
Video breakdown of a python biting model Orit Fox's surgically enhanced breast. The Telecinco video had aired in February 2011 on a segment for DJ Shmulik Tayar. Josh Plotkin who had problems breaking a board over his head in a video "Do something difficult" gets a web redemption which involves a recreation of scenes from the Karate Kid which includes appearances by the evil John Kreese (Martin Kove) instructing rival Bobby Brown. Roast of Daniel Tosh (parodying the Comedy Central Roast of Donald Trump -- which first aired immediately following this episode) in which Lisa Lampanelli and Jeffrey Ross say they can't find anything bad to say about Daniel. Segment "Twitten By" in which Twitter comments are pieced together to tell a story for a message to be sent to Erin Andrews. Video of Tristan Lentink being run over when his Honda CBR600RR motorcycle would not start at the beginning of a race in 2010 at TT Circuit Assen. Chris Brown teaches the writers how to dance. Fashion Theme: Collas
52	11	"Tay Zonday (Remix)"	May 17, 2011	3.17
Daniel reveals his new wardrobe for the second half of the season to be "exposed arms." Web remix for Tay Zonday of the hit song "Chocolate Rain". Boyz II Men is featured a backup singers. Daniel gets punched in the face by a boxer Manny Pacquiao, and talks about the Grandma Death Pool in his office. Fashion Theme: Exposed Arms
53	12	"Boom Goes The Dynamite Guy"	May 24, 2011	2.96
Web Redemption for "Boom Goes The Dynamite Guy" Brian Collins. Video Breakdown is a video of a girl playing with a dead squirrel. Daniel shows off his new invention called the High Toilet. And girls say stuff guys don't want to hear. Fashion Theme: Exposed Arms
54	13	"The Naked Wizard"	May 31, 2011	3.02
Web Redemption for The Naked Wizard with guest star James Van Der Beek. Daniel shows everybody his "pleasure coach". Fashion Theme: Exposed Arms
55	14	"Bug In Mouth Reporter"	June 7, 2011	2.59
Web Redemption for the Bug In Mouth Reporter. And Daniel creates a game show called "Knife Or Banana" where a person must guess what is behind his back with guest star Kate Upton. And when Daniel says to the girls to film guys saying stuff girls don't want to hear, they messed it up. Fashion Theme: Exposed Arms
56	15	"Cheerleader Fail Girls"	June 14, 2011	2.68
Web Redemption for the Cheerleader Fail girls with a cameo appearance of four Miami Dolphins cheerleaders. A video chat with Daniel's "sexpert". And Daniel makes a new challenge called "The Butter Challenge". Fashion Theme: Exposed Arms
57	16	"Heavy Metal Club"	June 21, 2011	2.72
Web Redemption for the Metal Club. Daniel plays Wiffle Ball with the Wiffle Ball Guy. Plus, Viewer Mail. Fashion Theme: Exposed Arms
58	17	"The Kid Who Farted on the Bus"	June 28, 2011	2.19
A fart-warming web redemption for the Fart Bus Kid, Daniel helps you stay positive, as well as taking your phone calls. Fashion Theme: Exposed Arms
59	18	"Phillies Taser Kid"	July 5, 2011	2.76
A web redemption for the Philly Taze Fan, Daniel learns to accept gay marriage, and the fans give reviews of Daniel's new bakery. Fashion Theme: Exposed Arms
60	19	"Drunk Knockout (Rematch)"	July 12, 2011	2.37
Web Rematch for the Drunk Knock-Out guys. A live video chat with a Work-Out Trainer who is on steroids. Daniel shows everybody dirty website names. Fashion Theme: Exposed Arms
61	20	"The $150,000 Tosh.0 Marathon"	July 19, 2011	2.78
A special showing of what happened at the Tosh.0 Marathon. A Video Breakdown of a guy trying Salvia and falling out of a window. In a game of "Is It Racist", a video of a teacher pointing out that the words "Nigger" and "Nigga" are completely different. Daniel makes a sex toy. Fashion Theme: Exposed Arms
62	21	"Leprechaun In Mobile (Investigation)"	July 26, 2011	2.59
Web Investigation for the Leprechaun in Mobile, Alabama. And Daniel says that Arizona State University is the winner of the Tosh.0 College Campus Invasion. Fashion Theme: Exposed Arms
63	22	"Eli Porter"	September 20, 2011	3.05
The world's worst rapper (after "lil wayne") gets a web redemption, Daniel crams four years of college into one day, he attempts to jump over 20 Arizona State cheerleaders and Satan on a slip and slide in a special segment of "I'm Better Than You, Na Na Na Boo Boo, Stick Your Head In Doo Doo, At ASU-U.", and arranges a good old-fashioned Tweet & Greet. Collegiate Apparel: Arizona State University
64	23	"Bumbling Surfer"	September 27, 2011	2.93
Web Redemption for the Surfer Fail guy. Daniel goes on a boat ride with a lady with extremely large breasts. And while Daniel was at ASU with his "Tweet and Greet", some students give him their phone numbers and he calls them. Collegiate Apparel: University of Miami
65	24	"Redneck Stuntman"	October 4, 2011	3.00
Web Redemption for the Redneck Stuntman. Daniel and some guy go to a live football interview with a coach who talks about cats and dogs. And Daniel makes another Twitter event called Insane Proclamations. Collegiate Apparel: Brevard Community College
66	25	"Brad The Actor"	October 11, 2011	2.88
Web Redemption for Brad The Actor. Daniel used to do something on Craigslist and he chatted with a girl named Ashley. So, he talked to her using Skype on a live chat. Collegiate Apparel: Brigham Young University
67	26	"Mushroom Guy (Intervention)"	October 18, 2011	3.05
Web Intervention for the Shrooms Guy. Daniel shows everybody what being a bad person looks like. and everything Daniel has said never got a chance to say on TV comes together into something called "The Gem File". Collegiate Apparel: Ohio State University
68	27	"Worst Magician Ever"	October 25, 2011	2.26
Web Redemption for the Magician Fail guy. Daniel shows everybody grossed out videos and video once submitted from some people to Tosh.0 is copied by others. Collegiate Apparel: Duke University
69	28	"Face Bumper Smash"	November 1, 2011	3.25
Web Redemption for the Face Bumper Smash guy. A live video chat with an artist who paints with his penis and after a video of Qaddafi's death, Daniel does a segment called Qaddafi'd. Collegiate Apparel: University of Texas
70	29	"I Just Shot Myself"	November 8, 2011	2.74
A web redemption for the guy who shot himself, the show celebrates Jesus's favorite football player, and Daniel shows everybody what's been getting him hard lately. Collegiate Apparel: Howard University
71	30	"Web Reflection"	November 15, 2011	2.86
Season Finale. A look back at the great moments of season 3, and Daniel searches for a replacement for season 4. Collegiate Apparel: University of Oregon

=== Season 4 (2012) ===
No. overall	No. in season	Title	Original release date	Viewers (millions)
72	1	"How To Get European Men"	January 31, 2012	3.12
Web Redemption for the How To Get European Men lady. The new wardrobe is High Fashion. Daniel talks about what happened on his break. The new host of Tosh.0 is actor/comedian Chris Rock, who then quits shortly after a cyst video. High Fashion: John Varvatos
73	2	"How To Draw Guy"	February 7, 2012	2.59
Web Redemption for the How To Draw Guy. After watching videos about ending abortion, Daniel makes a video about ending abortion and a live video chat with a girl who made one and he bids good-bye to football season. High Fashion: Duvetica
74	3	"Haboob Wedding"	February 14, 2012	2.46
Web Redemption for the Haboob Wedding couple. Daniel gets a work-out toy for his penis and he uses "Twitten By" to write his will. High Fashion: Ermenegildo Zegna
75	4	"Mustang Kid"	February 21, 2012	2.70
Web Redemption for the Mustang Kid. Daniel reveals which famous women over 40 he'd consider having sex with and he makes an all new way to play Rock-Paper-Scissors. High Fashion: DSQUARED²
76	5	"Bad Breakdancer"	February 28, 2012	2.61
Web Redemption for the Bad Breakdancer. Daniel celebrates Black History Month by sharing some Black History facts. High Fashion: Alexander McQueen
77	6	"Worst Sketch Group (Sketchdemption)"	March 6, 2012	2.59
Web Sketchdemption for the Worst Sketch Troupe. Daniel makes an anti-bullying video and he starts an auction called "The Tosh.0 Memorabilia Dump". High Fashion: Marc Jacobs
78	7	"Parkour Girl"	March 13, 2012	2.39
Web Redemption for the Parkour Girl. Daniel returns to Shark Tank with another invention called "Ski-Bowl" and he has an idea to relieve stress. High Fashion: Rag & Bone
79	8	"MMA Girl Chokes Out Guy (Rematch)"	March 20, 2012	2.53
Web Rematch for the MMA Girl Chokes Out Guy. Daniel tells everybody where he likes to eat out and he sends a Popsicle into space. High Fashion: Alexander McQueen
80	9	"Cliff Jumper"	March 27, 2012	2.64
Web Redemption for the Cliff Jumper. A live video chat with a couple who were doing math while they were driving, and Daniel shows everyday people doing not-so-hardcore parkour. High Fashion: Etro
81	10	"Tosh Memorabilia Dump"	April 3, 2012	2.64
Daniel tells everyone what he did with the money from the 'Tosh.0 Memorabilia Dump' auction by going to Vegas. And introduces a segment that involves touching women's stomachs while they are sitting down. This episode marks the last installment of High Fashion. High Fashion: Dolce & Gabbana
82	11	"Smell Yo Dick Girl"	May 29, 2012	2.77
Web Redemption for the Smell Yo Dick singer. The new wardrobe is Sick Kicks for the Ladies. Daniel interviews an old lady who fights against gay rights, videos of women breastfeeding babies, and announces his upcoming animated show, Brickleberry, with a sneak peek of his character, a bear cub named Malloy. Sick Kicks for the Ladies: Reebok Ex-O-Fit
83	12	"Skateboarding Fail"	June 5, 2012	2.23
Web Redemption for the Skateboarder Hit By Truck with guest star Tony Hawk. Daniel starts a Kick Starter campaign to become a trillionaire and shows what people are searching for on Google. Sick Kicks for the Ladies: Adidas Adi Rise
84	13	"Pepper Spray Neutralizer"	June 12, 2012	2.08
Web Redemption for the Pepper Spray Guy. Daniel gets shot with a tiny canon and he introduces some all-new emoticons. Sick Kicks for the Ladies: SUPRA
85	14	"Spelling Bee Kid"	June 19, 2012	2.18
Web Redemption for the Spelling Bee Kid. Daniel converses with zombies and experiments with explosives. Sick Kicks for the Ladies: New Balance New England Prep
86	15	"How To Flirt Guy"	June 26, 2012	2.53
Web Redemption for the How To Flirt Guy. After a video of the world's best parallel parker, Daniel beats that record in "I'm Better Than You, Na-Na Na Boo-Boo, Stick Your Head In Doo-Doo". Daniel also listens to everybody's odd medical problems and helps them in a new segment called "Tweetment". Sick Kicks for the Ladies: Clae Mighty Crown
87	16	"Bubb Rubb"	July 3, 2012	2.18
Web Redemption for internet legend Bubb Rubb. Daniel employs some cheap labor on Fiverr, and he invents and demonstrates a dirty game called "Slap, Lick, Fondle". Sick Kicks for the Ladies: Reebok Court Victory Pump
88	17	"Kid Juggalo"	July 10, 2012	2.24
Web Redemption for the Juggalo Kid with guest stars Insane Clown Posse. Daniel creates all new internet challenges. And he airs videos of fans doing the dirty game "Slap, Lick, Fondle". Sick Kicks for the Ladies: Puma Alexander McQueen
89	18	"Army Prankster"	July 17, 2012	1.91
Web Redemption for the Army Mom Prank guy. Daniel re-creates a video of a woman auditioning for a movie. And fans of comic-con give a review of Brickleberry. Sick Kicks for the Ladies: Cole Haan Lunargrand Chukka
90	19	"S**tty Rock Climber"	July 24, 2012	2.33
Web Redemption for the Rock Climber that pooped his pants. Daniel connects with his female audience. And he airs videos of the worst internet challenges made by his fans. Sick Kicks for the Ladies: Missoni Chucks
91	20	"Hurl-a-Whirl (Regurgitation)"	July 31, 2012	1.79
Daniel and his staff take on the Sprite and Banana challenge in a Web Regurgitation. He does every single Olympic sport in only a minute. And Daniel gives random predictions of 2012. Also the last episode of the summer and Sick Kicks For The Ladies. Sick Kicks for the Ladies: Nike Air Max 2012 Olympic
92	21	"Blackface Kid"	September 25, 2012	2.15
Web Redemption for the Boy In Black Face with guest stars Keegan-Michael Key and Jordan Peele from Key and Peele. The new wardrobe is Overpriced Concert Tees with Sexy Stubble. Daniel and his staff train for the new half of season 4 Hard Knocks style. And he finds a picture from Instagram to hang on his wall. Beginning with this episode, Daniel also gives spoiler alerts to his new series, Brickleberry, which began airing following this episode. Overpriced Concert Tee: Japandroids
93	22	"Krispy Kreme (Exclusive Interview)"	October 2, 2012	2.34
Exclusive Interview for rapper Krispy Kreme. Daniel creates a new way to drink shots, and he ask his fans to watch a really gross video and film their reactions. Overpriced Concert Tee: Frank Ocean
94	23	"Sweet Brown"	October 9, 2012	2.21
Web Redemption for Sweet Brown. Daniel shows everybody a creepy video of a man who did a strange thing while his niece's video chat camera was still on, and his fans film themselves coming up their own shots. Overpriced Concert Tee: Tegan and Sara
95	24	"Tisha UnArmed (CeWEBrity Profile)"	October 16, 2012	1.74
CeWEBrity Profile for Tisha UnArmed. Daniel wrestles a guy, and he asks his guy fans to take pictures on Instagram of themselves doing girl poses in a segment called Bros Pose Like Hoes Photo's. Overpriced Concert Tee: Alice in Chains
96	25	"Male Cheerleader"	October 23, 2012	2.39
Web Redemption for the Male Cheerleader. Daniel films himself sleeping to see if he is a sleep walker, and he shows everyone videos of people talking about the election. Overpriced Concert Tee: Captain Murphy
97	26	"Bryan Adams Kid"	October 30, 2012	2.29
Web Redemption for the Bryan Adams Guy. Daniel shows off his Halloween costume, and tries to track down a monster. Overpriced Concert Tee: Deadmau5
98	27	"Girl Scout Thieves"	November 13, 2012	2.26
Web Redemption for one of the Girl Scout Thieves. Daniel shows his new basketball league, and he makes his staff eat dog food without them noticing. Overpriced Concert Tee: JJ
99	28	"Taxi Dave"	November 20, 2012	2.11
Web Redemption for Taxi Dave. Daniel talks about stuff on Reddit, and he celebrates Thanksgiving with his fans online. Overpriced Concert Tee: Fort Frances
100	29	"Virgin Trampoline Jumper"	November 27, 2012	2.25
Web Redemption for the Virgin Trampoline Jumper with guest stars Joe Rogan and Doug Stanhope of The Man Show. Daniel shows everyone a video of angry women, and hires a guy to do a voice-over over his voice called bad lip-reading. This is the 100th episode of the series. Overpriced Concert Tee: 2 Live Crew
101	30	"Season Four Web Reflection"	December 4, 2012	2.29
The Season 4 Finale featuring all the funniest moments of the show in 2012. Daniel creates a Christmas-themed chain reaction, and he tells everyone about the hottest Christmas gifts. This is also the last episode of Overpriced Concert Tees with Sexy Stubble as Daniel's wardrobe. Overpriced Concert Tee: Dr. Teeth and the Electric Mayhem

=== Season 5 (2013) ===
No. overall	No. in season	Title	Original release date	U.S. viewers (millions)
102	1	"Gingers Have Souls"	February 5, 2013	2.26
Web Redemption for the Gingers Have Souls guy. The redemption involves a parody of the Dr. Phil show. The new wardrobe is "Cashmere". The new set is revealed. Daniel proves he is the best athlete ever, and he texts strangers a creepy photo and lets them tell him what they think in "Textual Harassment". Fashion Theme: Cashmere
103	2	"X12 (CeWEBrity Profile)"	February 12, 2013	1.90
CeWEBrity Profile for X12. Daniel creates a new Tour-De-France with unicycles, and he asks his fans on Twitter to tell their Valentine's crush their opinion about them. Fashion Theme: Cashmere
104	3	"Spoiler Alert: Oscars"	February 19, 2013	2.15
Daniel gives spoiler alerts about the movies that are nominated for Best Picture and interviews via Skype a fat man who believes that you can work out in bed. Fashion Theme: Cashmere
105	4	"Courtroom C**k Guy"	February 26, 2013	2.14
Web Redemption for the Courtroom Cock Guy with guest star comedian Andrew Dice Clay. Daniel creates new racist names and asks a group of people for their opinions in "Is It Racist?". Daniel asks his viewers try a game he created called Sports or Consequences and film themselves playing the game. Fashion Theme: Cashmere
106	5	"Bad Ventriloquist"	March 5, 2013	1.97
Web Redemption for the Ventriloquist Fail girl. Daniel beats a record in the return of I'm Better Than You, Na Na Na Boo Boo, Stick Your Head In Doo Doo. Daniel refuses to make a Harlem Shake video, but instead shows the viewers the first one ever made. Fashion Theme: Cashmere
107	6	"Fat Bottle Ninja"	March 12, 2013	2.16
Web Redemption for the Fat Bottle Ninja with guest star Danny Trejo. Daniel learns how to sing from a talented singer on the internet, they also sing together with a song "Old McDonald Had a Farm" with Daniel's staff (including the writers of Tosh.0), and he shows everybody his Instagram pictures of him and his girlfriend. Fashion Theme: Cashmere
108	7	"The Illusion (CeWEBrity Profile)"	March 19, 2013	2.11
CeWEBrity Profile for The Illusion. Daniel raps for people not to hate gay people, and he discovers that there are people creating Twitter accounts with his name. Fashion Theme: Cashmere
109	8	"LP Theories"	March 26, 2013	2.35
Web Redemption for the LP Theories girls. Daniel shows everyone his new fragrance that contains women's period blood, and he hangs out with comedian Carrot Top. Fashion Theme: Cashmere
110	9	"Plus Size Model"	April 2, 2013	2.22
Web Redemption for the Plus Size Model. Daniel introduces a strange man in a new segment called "What's Your Name?," and he makes up laws that might fix up America. Fashion Theme: Cashmere
111	10	"BK Chicken Fries"	April 9, 2013	2.06
Web Redemption for the BK Chicken Fries guy. Video Breakdown of a slap fight. Daniel uses Flash Cotton to do the experiment with his staff, and later gives away some of his gift cards. Fashion Theme: Cashmere
112	11	"Hey, Baby Girl"	April 16, 2013	2.26
Web Redemption for the Hey Baby Girl guy. After Bill Gates creates a new form of a condom, Daniel makes his own kind, and he stops separation from every thing after a racist situation in Georgia. Daniel also asks his fans to imitate the crazy man from the "What's Your Name" segment and film it. Fashion Theme: Cashmere
113	12	"Fired For Being Too Hot"	April 23, 2013	1.83
Daniel discusses sexual harassment, makes you even more paranoid about staying in hotels, and pays tribute to trees in time for Arbor Day, plus a woman who was fired from her job for being too attractive gets a web redemption. Fashion Theme: Cashmere
114	13	"P***y Power (CeWEBrity Profile)"	April 30, 2013	2.41
CeWEBrity Profile for the Pussy Power lady. Daniel interviews via Skype of a kid with so many hickeys, and later he and his staff get random gifts. Fashion Theme: Cashmere
115	14	"Ready To Mingle (CeWEBrity Profile)"	May 7, 2013	1.83
CeWEBrity Profile for Tonetta (musician). Daniel gets prom invitations from his female fans on Twitter, and he spoils The Hangover Part III. Fashion Theme: Cashmere
116	15	"Nerf Hoops (30 For 30.0)"	May 14, 2013	1.78
30 For 30.0 special for the Nerf Dunker. Daniel meets his African successor, who can't perform under pressure, and he posts a poll to let his viewers decide whether he is famous or he should kill himself after his Groundhog Day clock on his website runs out. NOTE: After A summer long Hiatus, 99% of the voters said he's famous while 1% say would kill himself. From the September 3rd, 2013 Episode Onwards, Daniel is Famous and would still Work on Comedy Central & Tosh.0 Forever. Fashion Theme: Cashmere
117	16	"Furries Kid"	September 3, 2013	2.04
Web Redemption for the Furries Kid. Daniel learns how to "Prancercise". The new wardrobe is Subtle Difference, meaning the style of the wardrobe will change with every episode. Daniel purifies some milk. Fashion Theme: Cashmere
118	17	"USA Chant Fail"	September 10, 2013	2.03
Web Redemption for the USA Chant Fail guy, and Daniel gives advice to a kid. Subtle Difference: Sleeves were unbuttoned
119	18	"Lohanthony (CeWEBrity Profile)"	September 17, 2013	2.23
CeWEBrity Profile for Lohanthony. Daniel rants about an annoying "princess," and he celebrates a made up holiday called "Boomerang Day". Jake Baldino from Pretty Much It on YouTube guest stars. Subtle Difference: Was clean shaven
120	19	"DJ Decimal Point"	September 24, 2013	2.00
Web Redemption for the Bad DJ. Daniel sees if a video of a girl who talks dirty to her black boyfriend is racist in "Is It Racist?", and he wants his Twitter fans to write him a letter to his future daughter in "Twitten By". Subtle Difference: Was wearing a watch
121	20	"Life Savings for a Rasta Banana"	October 1, 2013	2.07
Web Redemption for the Carnival Life Savings guy. Daniel explains why gravy is the food of the fall, and he shows the viewers another adventure of Big Ass Baby. Subtle Difference: Pants changed color
122	21	"Force Field Master"	October 8, 2013	2.25
Wed Redemption for the Force Field Master. Daniel shows a video of kid drinking beer at a college football party, and he show the viewers the worst high school name ever, Analy High School. Subtle Difference: Shirt was tucked in
123	22	"Competitive Sushi Eater"	October 15, 2013	1.97
Web Redemption for a competitive Sushi Eating guy and Daniel learns about The birds and the bees. Subtle Difference: Bottom button was pink
124	23	"Redemption Reunion Spectacular: Where Are They Now?"	October 22, 2013	1.68
A reunion episode featuring Afro Ninja, Chris Crocker, Balloon Man Bill, and one of the Risky Business Girls in the first-ever Tosh.Oh, That's What They're Up To Now Redemption Reunion Spectacular. Daniel shows the viewers some commercials he starred in. And he also shows video of kids dancing while their parents film them without them noticing. Subtle Difference: Sleeves were rolled down
125	24	"Headbanger Workout"	October 29, 2013	1.92
Web Redemption for the Headbanger Workout lady. Daniel lets his staff get buzzed at work. And he gives soldiers some horrifying news. Subtle Difference: Shirt had a pocket
126	25	"How To Teach Kid"	November 5, 2013	1.60
Web Redemption for the How To Teach Kid. Daniel meets a female candidate for president in 2016 via web chat, and he shows the viewers the negative reviews about Comedy Central on Yelp.com. Subtle Difference: Was wearing a wedding ring
127	26	"Security Officer Jay"	November 12, 2013	1.84
Web Redemption for Security Officer Jay. Daniel celebrates Movember, and his office has their own purge. Subtle Difference: Placket was a different color
128	27	"Happy Birthday Katie"	November 19, 2013	1.67
Web Redemption for the Happy Birthday Katie guy. Daniel mocks rich Instagramers and celebrates the ones that are dirt poor and proud of it, in a new segment called: Broke Ass Mofos taking Poor Ass Photos for Tosh.0. Later, he and his staff takes a home AIDS test. Subtle Difference: Was wearing Oxford buttons on his collar.
129	28	"Bad Impressions"	November 26, 2013	1.76
Daniel makes your Thanksgiving extra queer, gives you a rare opportunity to own a valuable piece of the Tosh Empire, and a terrible impressionist gets a Web Redemption. Subtle Difference: Was wearing an undershirt
130	29	"Ostomy Bag Girl (CeWEBrity Profile)"	December 3, 2013	1.84
The girl that explained how to change her Ileostomy bag on YouTube gets a CeWEBrity Profile (this coincided with Crohn's and Colitis Awareness Week). Daniel also shows a Christmas card one of his writers sent him and asks his fans to send him their own. Subtle Difference: Sleeves were rolled below elbows
131	30	"Season 5 Web Reflection"	December 10, 2013	1.72
Season 5 finale. Daniel takes a look back at the show's funniest moments of 2013, picks the most fascinating people of 2013 and shows you all the differences from his outfit. Later, he shows his favorite Christmas card submission. Subtle Difference: Was wearing a different shirt.

=== Season 6 (2014) ===
No. overall	No. in season	Title	Original release date	U.S. viewers (millions)
132	1	"We Buy Golf"	February 18, 2014	2.14
Season 6 premiere. The new wardrobe is "The Season of Brad", a tribute to Brad Pitt. A weightlifter learns a lesson in proper gym attire, Daniel comes face-to-face with a live bear, and the owner of a golf store gets a "Mad Men"-style consultation. Starting with this episode, the cold open warning is read in several different languages. The Season of Brad: Mr. & Mrs. Smith
133	2	"IceJJFish"	February 25, 2014	1.96
Daniel takes a girl out on a date, gives his car away and gives golden-throated singer Ice JJ Fish a web redemption. The Season of Brad: Fight Club
134	3	"Take No Orders"	March 4, 2014	1.53
A scooter driver struggles to avoid other vehicles; a vocal sexist experiences what it's like to be a woman. Daniel introduces a new app for nervous poopers on the go. The Season of Brad: A River Runs Through It
135	4	"Ben's Video Resume"	March 11, 2014	1.73
Daniel has lunch with a homeless man; a kid who's forced to enter the workplace gets a web redemption. Daniel speaks to Congress. The Season of Brad: Burn After Reading
136	5	"Boomer the Dog"	March 18, 2014	1.73
A man is passed out in a bathroom stall; Boomer the Dog competes for Best in Show; Daniel tries to find a suitable lawyer. The Season of Brad: Inglourious Basterds
137	6	"Model Teacher"	March 25, 2014	1.57
An out-of-shape football fan crashes into a pole, a teacher who got fired for modeling on the side gets a second chance, and Daniel demonstrates how to make toilet wine. The Season of Brad: Ocean's Trilogy
138	7	"Prancing Elites"	April 1, 2014	1.54
A ginger breaks his arm during a gymnastics routine, Daniel goes on tour with a cross-dressing dance troupe, and Todd Glass pranks a member of the Tosh.0 audience. The Season of Brad: Snatch
139	8	"Comedian Daniel Songer"	April 8, 2014	1.33
A gorilla gets frisky with a tourist, Dr. Stanley Kramer helps the audience get in touch with their sphincters, and Daniel officiates a parking lot wedding. The Season of Brad: The Assassination of Jesse James by the Coward Robert Ford
140	9	"Misses Every Layup"	April 15, 2014	1.54
A Japanese wrestler fights a doll, a lion gets sick, and Daniel redeems a black man who's bad at basketball. The Season of Brad: True Romance
141	10	"Roof Jump"	April 22, 2014	1.41
Daniel talks with a creepy guy in Los Angeles; shows us how to up our hashtag game; a woman who tried to raise money on the Internet after being injured gets a web redemption. The Season of Brad: Moneyball
142	11	"Spoken Word Fail"	April 29, 2014	1.42
Two Japanese women race while performing full splits, and Daniel shows why he's a crowd favorite in between events. The Season of Brad: Troy
143	12	"Banned From Walmart"	May 6, 2014	1.40
Daniel throws horseshoes at women; a recorded conversation with Daniel gets leaked to the press; and the cheapest man in America (who was Banned from Walmart) gets a web redemption As Daniel does The Price Is Right Parody: The Cost is Correct. The Season of Brad: The Mexican
144	13	"Nana Nana Subaru Winner"	May 13, 2014	1.28
Daniel reveals the winner of the Subaru contest. The Season of Brad: Seven Years In Tibet
145	14	"Space Shuttle Launch"	May 20, 2014	1.26
A teenage girl brings a shovel to a fistfight, a guy who lost the space race gets a Web Redemption, and Daniel asks fans to tweet their #twisdom to the class of 2014. The Season of Brad: Friends
146	15	"Perfect Game Bowler"	May 27, 2014	1.25
Brazilian soccer fans celebrate a goal, Daniel redeems a bowler, and Gary Busey visits. The Season of Brad: Interview with the Vampire
147	16	"Summertime is Great"	August 26, 2014	1.66
A revolving door stunt turns gruesome, the family band behind "Summertime Is Great" gets a Web Redemption, and Daniel tries to be a bounty hunter. Beginning with this episode, the cold open warning is made up of sound clips of Barack Obama edited together. Fashion Theme: 15 Shades of Grey
148	17	"Lingerie Football Coach"	September 2, 2014	1.30
Kids join the fight against terrorism, a football coach berates his lingerie-clad team, and Daniel solicits outside opinions for a round of Is It Racist? Fashion Theme: 15 Shades of Grey
149	18	"Bryan Silva (Gratata)"	September 9, 2014	1.30
A couple gets handsy at their local McDonald's, Daniel hangs out with Bryan Silva on his yachtata, and Tosh.0's male fans send in nude photos of themselves. Fashion Theme: 15 Shades of Grey
150	19	"Dog Trainer"	September 16, 2014	1.43
A teenager passionately defends fedoras, a fed-up dog trainer gets a Web Redemption, and Daniel presents his take on life hacks. Fashion Theme: 15 Shades of Grey
151	20	"Dumped by Sweetheart"	September 23, 2014	1.22
Daniel turns himself into a human tornado, helps a brokenhearted teenager named Dustin McElroy, who gets a Web Redemption and is catfished, and an unexpected threesome participant talks about how it went. Charlotte McKinney makes an appearance in this episode. Fashion Theme: 15 Shades of Grey
152	21	"Weightlifting"	September 30, 2014	1.62
A fat man in a thong shows off his dance moves, two accident-prone weightlifters get a Web Redemption, and Daniel plays "Is It Racist?" with a local news team. Fashion Theme: 15 Shades of Grey
153	22	"The Family Friendly Episode"	October 7, 2014	1.74
A TV-G rated episode that focuses on fun child oriented content. A rocking horse bucks its rider, a little girl proves to have a very strong grip, and Daniel becomes a big brother for a day. Fashion Theme: 15 Shades of Grey
154	23	"Redneck Rappers"	October 14, 2014	1.36
A performance artist makes herself puke, Daniel redeems a pair of white rappers, and Lane Kiffin fends off haters on his public access show. Fashion Theme: 15 Shades of Grey
155	24	"Redemption Reunion Spectacular"	October 21, 2014	1.29
A driver hits a little girl riding her bike, previous Web Redemption recipients return for a reunion in the second annual Tosh.Oh, That's What They're Up To Now Redemption Reunion Spectacular., and Daniel introduces the Tosh.0 credit card. Fashion Theme: 15 Shades of Grey
156	25	"Kayak"	October 28, 2014	1.32
Andy Kindler rants about fall TV, a redhead loses control of his kayak, and Daniel's fans try to scare him on Twitter. Fashion Theme: 15 Shades of Grey
157	26	"Date Camp"	November 4, 2014	1.23
A man attempts a daring stunt in a bar, the couple behind Date Camp goes to boot camp, and Daniel introduces a surefire way to avoid sexually transmitted infections. Fashion Theme: 15 Shades of Grey
158	27	"Gay Restaurant"	November 11, 2014	1.27
A driver has a disastrous run-in with a parking gate, a gay couple kicked out of a Texas restaurant gets revenge, and Daniel retaliates against ESPN. Daniel also interviews a YouTube pastor to predicts that Vladimir Putin will reveal President Barack Obama's sexual identity via web chat. Fashion Theme: 15 Shades of Grey
159	28	"Wheel of Fortune"	November 18, 2014	1.15
A man has sex with a pillow, a Cowboys fan throws a violent tantrum, plus Julian Batts nicknamed the worst Wheel of Fortune contestant ever on the game's syndicated 6000th nighttime episode gets a web redemption, and Daniel premieres House Hunters: The Musical. NOTE: Almost 5 Years After This Episode Aired, Batts Appeared on the May 16, 2019 Episode of The Price Is Right But the mistakes of the Wheel's 6000th nighttime show weren't mentioned, neither was his Tosh.O appearance. Fashion Theme: 15 Shades of Grey
160	29	"Black Santa"	November 25, 2014	0.95
On a special Christmas edition of Tosh.0, Mrs. Claus shows off her sexy side, a mob gets into the Black Friday spirit, Daniel explains how to create a beef baby, and he beats a record in the return of I'm Better Than You, Na Na Na Boo Boo, Stick Your Head In Doo Doo. Fashion Theme: 15 Shades of Grey
161	30	"The Best of Season 6"	December 2, 2014	1.27
A woman makes the mistake of driving onto train tracks, Daniel recaps everything that happened during Season 6, and a drunken Doug Stanhope predicts the future. Fashion Theme: 15 Shades of Grey

=== Season 7 (2015) ===
No. overall	No. in season	Title	Original release date	U.S. viewers (millions)
162	1	"Puke Drummer"	February 17, 2015	1.22
On the Tosh.0 season premiere, Daniel takes the year's most acclaimed movies down a peg, he also gives a drummer who vomited during a show the opportunity to perform on the Las Vegas Strip, and declares war on the Super Bowl champions. Fashion Theme: Prints Charming
163	2	"Buckcherry Wedding"	February 24, 2015	1.12
A woman becomes an awfully wedded wife, Daniel introduces sadomasochism to the workplace and ASU engages in some distracting behavior. Fashion Theme: Prints Charming
164	3	"Monster Energy"	March 3, 2015	1.05
A woman throws bacon at police officers, an activist accuses Monster Energy of being in league with the devil, and Daniel shares unclaimed domain names with his audience. Fashion Theme: Prints Charming
165	4	"Shoenice"	March 10, 2015	0.96
A hobo gets a CeWEBrity Profile, a creepy critic gets critiqued, and Daniel bridges America's racial divide. Fashion Theme: Prints Charming
166	5	"Jackie B"	March 17, 2015	0.93
A Russian man jumps off a roof while on fire, a rapper takes her love of big penises to the next level, and Daniel highlights potentially dangerous Internet users. Fashion Theme: Prints Charming
167	6	"Sting Wrestling Fan"	March 24, 2015	1.02
Daniel redeems wrestling's number one fanboy, gets roasted by the least famous people in the world and makes the streets safe for fashion. Fashion Theme: Prints Charming
168	7	"Atheist in a Foxhole"	March 31, 2015	1.08
Daniel fights the good fight with an ardent atheist, a spacey Alaskan man runs for mayor, and the Tosh.0 staff helps out America's embattled fraternities. Fashion Theme: Prints Charming
169	8	"RC Car"	April 7, 2015	1.11
A man finds a new use for Cheetos, a street performer gets in over his head, and Daniel opens up about his affiliation with the Church of Scientology. Fashion Theme: Prints Charming
170	9	"Sign Spinner"	April 14, 2015	1.11
A Russian military parade goes wrong, a science teacher learns to be more careful with his demonstrations, and Daniel brainstorms ways to solve California's drought problem. Fashion Theme: Prints Charming
171	10	"Girl Dunks"	April 21, 2015	1.15
A little girl gets her hands on an assault rifle, a young woman's slam dunk attempt ends painfully, and Daniel adopts a hand puppet. Fashion Theme: Prints Charming
172	11	"Microwave Glow Stick"	April 28, 2015	1.00
Naked men perform an interpretive dance, a Chinese con artist botches an insurance scam, and a teenager gets creative with his microwave. Fashion Theme: Prints Charming
173	12	"Fedora Hero Saves Eggs"	May 5, 2015	1.05
A British man gets mischievous with a magnifying glass, Daniel helps out in his community, and two masochistic YouTube users find love. Fashion Theme: Prints Charming
174	13	"High School Football Fan"	May 12, 2015	1.12
A camel gives birth, a high school football fan goes pro, Daniel comes up with exciting new uses for a leaf blower, and he takes stunt tossing to a new level in the segment of I'm Better Than You, Na Na Na Na Boo Boo, Stick Your Head In Doo Doo. Fashion Theme: Prints Charming
175	14	"How to Give a BJ"	May 19, 2015	0.97
Daniel starts a new wrestling tradition at the office, a YouTuber gets intimate with some fruit, and Big Ass Baby goes to the prom. Fashion Theme: Prints Charming
176	15	"Where Are They Now? Pt.3"	May 26, 2015	0.93
Daniel checks in with some of the show's legends in the third annual Tosh.Oh, That's What They're Up To Now Redemption Reunion Spectacular., faces his most annoying fans, and makes an announcement that could shock the movie industry. Fashion Theme: Prints Charming
177	16	"Angelo Garcia, He-Man"	August 25, 2015	1.08
A woman gives birth in a car, a former member of Menudo gets a CeWEBrity Profile, and Daniel reviews a new book about football coach Nick Saban. Fashion Theme: The Season That Was Motherf**king Tucked
178	17	"Welven Da Great"	September 1, 2015	0.92
Daniel breaks down a martial arts demonstration gone wrong, creates his own relaxation recording, and he demonstrates how to switch bikes mid-ride in the segment of I'm Better Than You, Na Na Na Boo Boo, Stick Your Head In Doo Doo. Welven Da Great talks about being the face of Deez Nuts, and Subway meets with a new potential spokesperson. Fashion Theme: The Season That Was Motherf**king Tucked
179	18	"Car Jump Kid"	September 8, 2015	0.83
Daniel gives a bully the what-for, a makeup artist turns herself into a husky, and an amateur stuntman, who gets a Web Redemption, ups his game. Fashion Theme: The Season That Was Motherf**king Tucked
180	19	"Annie, Don't Fall"	September 15, 2015	0.86
Daniel dons an elephant G-string, a clumsy cruise ship passenger gets a Web Redemption, and members of Tosh.0 audience share what's in their hearts. Fashion Theme: The Season That Was Motherf**king Tucked
181	20	"Vegan Guy"	September 22, 2015	0.91
A woman demonstrates a novel way to inflate balloons, a drunk German has trouble finding the urinal, and Daniel gets radical with an outspoken vegan, who gets a CeWEBrity Profile. Daniel also interviews a guy who wraps tape around everyday objects on YouTube via web chat, and then, he goes adhesive-crazy on his staff. Fashion Theme: The Season That Was Motherf**king Tucked
182	21	"Rifle Kid"	September 29, 2015	1.04
Web Redemption for the Rifle Kid. A naked Spider-Man gets freaky in his hotel room, two friends discover a racist sink, Daniel looks to hire recent college grads fresh out of sorority life, and he subjects his staff to a wholly unhygienic teamwork exercise. Fashion Theme: The Season That Was Motherf**king Tucked
183	22	"Ladies' Night: A Female Empowerment Episode"	October 6, 2015	0.97
On the Tosh.0 Ladies Night special episode, Daniel gives a Web Redemption for the Prom Stripper guy. The ocean puts a damper on two couples' marriage proposals, Daniel also celebrates a few celebrity marriages that were thankfully brief, breaks down three cases of people losing control of their emotions, and he sets up the perfect play date for a peanut-butter-covered baby. Fashion Theme: The Season That Was Motherf**king Tucked
184	23	"Kitten Play"	October 13, 2015	0.86
A man shows off his malleable skull, a young woman who pretends to be a kitten during BDSM play gets a CeWEBrity Profile, and helps Daniel reboot a beloved cartoon. Daniel also presents a selection of videos that could go either way, in the segment called, "Is It Porn?". Fashion Theme: The Season That Was Motherf**king Tucked
185	24	"Sword Nose"	October 20, 2015	0.83
Daniel performs plastic surgery on a man with a gruesome party injury, who gets a Web Redemption. A nerdy couple holds a "Star Wars"-theme wedding, and Daniel also goes down a YouTube rabbit hole after uncovering a mysterious video plea for help. Fashion Theme: The Season That Was Motherf**king Tucked
186	25	"Tosh Memorabilia Auction #2"	October 27, 2015	0.88
A young woman gets caught in a surprise mosh pit, doctors remove an eclectic array of objects from within patients' bodies in the return of What's In Your Body?, and Daniel heads to Las Vegas to gamble the proceeds of the Tosh.0 prop auction. Fashion Theme: The Season That Was Motherf**king Tucked
187	26	"Elephant Lady"	November 3, 2015	0.88
A Brazilian man proves to be too heavy for a zip line, an antinatalist activist gets a CeWEBrity Profile, and Daniel makes waves with his personal tribute to Selena Gomez's "Good for You". Fashion Theme: The Season That Was Motherf**king Tucked
188	27	"Catfish Cooley"	November 10, 2015	0.90
In the segment of CeWEBrity Profile, Daniel helps a down-home YouTuber with a catchy nickname land his big break on reality television. A halftime performer finds herself in a tight spot, and Daniel's staff members to complete in his Tough Mudder-inspired, butter-based obstacle course. Fashion Theme: The Season That Was Motherf**king Tucked
189	28	"Possum Lady"	November 17, 2015	0.75
The Tosh.0 office begins a painful weekly tradition, a woman gets cozy with her pet opossums in the segment of CeWEBrity Profile, and Daniel and his audience try to harness the power of their brain waves. Fashion Theme: The Season That Was Motherf**king Tucked
190	29	"Arm Wrestle Break"	November 24, 2015	0.84
A woman gets intimate with a wolf, an arm wrestler, who gets a Web Redemption, visits from across the pond, and Daniel tries to raise the profile of an obscure Swedish snack with a singing YouTuber in the Tosh.0 office. Fashion Theme: The Season That Was Motherf**king Tucked
191	30	"The Best of Season 7"	December 1, 2015	1.11
A bear gets evicted from under a porch, a mall Santa botches a big Christmas stunt, and Daniel looks back on 2015's biggest moments. Fashion Theme: The Season That Was Motherf**king Tucked

=== Season 8 (2016) ===
No. overall	No. in season	Title	Original release date	U.S. viewers (millions)
192	1	"Pixee Fox"	February 9, 2016	0.81
Daniel shows off his manliest wardrobe ever; profiles a plastic dream queen; steals jokes from a legendary comic. Fashion Theme: Cabin Couture
193	2	"Fart Porn"	February 16, 2016	0.84
Daniel grants a wish from a guy who's very sick; Daniel cashes in on combining his love of dogs and quality automobiles; Daniel gets involved in a Twitter beef Fashion. Fashion Theme: Cabin Couture
194	3	"Tree Fall Kid"	February 23, 2016	0.85
Daniel helps a guy get revenge on Mother Nature; gives out Oscars for racism; uses a condom for the first and last time. Fashion Theme: Cabin Couture
195	4	"Food Reviewer"	March 1, 2016	0.81
A jelly bean taste test ends poorly, a fast food critic samples exotic new cuisine, and Daniel endorses a strange and novel method of birth control for men. Fashion Theme: Cabin Couture
196	5	"Men's Rights Lawyers"	March 8, 2016	0.75
Two lizards get sexy on chaise lounges, a Filipino drag queen flops hard, and a teenager (via web chat) shows off her flatulence. Fashion Theme: Cabin Couture
197	6	"Mini Bike Jump"	March 15, 2016	0.86
A little Welsh girl delivers a baby sheep, a stuntwoman takes a nasty spill, and Daniel finds out if Google is racist. Fashion Theme: Cabin Couture
198	7	"Rich Piana"	March 22, 2016	0.97
A wheelie stunt goes as well as can be expected, Daniel hits the gym with an extreme bodybuilder, and a Maori wedding meets its match. Fashion Theme: Cabin Couture
199	8	"Pee Lady"	March 29, 2016	0.84
A Brazilian man tries to walk off a broken leg, a woman uses her own urine as a panacea, and Daniel finds a presidential candidate he can believe in. Fashion Theme: Cabin Couture
200	9	"Catcaller"	April 5, 2016	0.76
A volunteer gets kicked in the head during a karate demo, a man claims he can heal people with the power of his gaze, and Daniel seeks a solution to catcalling. NOTE: This is the 200th Episode of the Series. Fashion Theme: Cabin Couture
201	10	"Yotta Life"	April 12, 2016	0.91
A couple of buff Brits hit each other with chairs, Vice investigates a questionable life-coaching operation, and Daniel and his staff gets into "Genital Jousting." Fashion Theme: Cabin Couture
202	11	"Hillary Clinton Supporter"	June 7, 2016	0.82
Daniel redeems a very vocal Hillary Clinton supporter; terrorizes Broadway; fans get a chance to sign Daniel's yearbook. Daniel also reveals his new wardrobe. Fashion Theme: Tropical Island Resort Wear Collection For Tosh By Tosh
203	12	"Dr. Pimple Popper"	June 14, 2016	0.68
A man pulls a nasty prank using a vacuum, a pair of Serbian thieves try (and fail) to steal a fridge full of beer, and the Internet goes crazy for hydraulic presses. Fashion Theme: Tropical Island Resort Wear Collection For Tosh By Tosh
204	13	"Queenzflip"	June 21, 2016	0.66
A woman head-butts a cake, a man tests out a homemade jetpack, and Daniel takes a ride with a YouTube star known for his violent dancing. Fashion Theme: Tropical Island Resort Wear Collection For Tosh By Tosh
205	14	"Tiamat the Dragon"	June 28, 2016	0.66
Daniel ventures into the lair of a person who's using extreme body modification to gradually become a human dragon. Fashion Theme: Tropical Island Resort Wear Collection For Tosh By Tosh
206	15	"Bubble Hat"	July 5, 2016	0.81
A woman learns not to mess with snakes, a suburban daredevil attempts an ambitious jump, and Tosh.0 pays tribute to reckless fireworks enthusiasts. Fashion Theme: Tropical Island Resort Wear Collection For Tosh By Tosh
207	16	"Bond Girl"	July 12, 2016	0.77
A woman eats a live octopus, Daniel produces a movie with the first female Bond, and the internet goes crazy for bottle-flipping videos. Fashion Theme: Tropical Island Resort Wear Collection For Tosh By Tosh
208	17	"Three Cheese"	July 19, 2016	0.76
A vlogger proves just how lazy he is, a private chef demonstrates how to make the easiest recipe in the world, and a bro finds inspiration in a lost phone via web chat. Fashion Theme: Tropical Island Resort Wear Collection For Tosh By Tosh
209	18	"Sex Doll Repairman"	July 26, 2016	0.69
A woman shows off her hand-dancing technique, Daniel's Twitter followers critique video art, and a man trapped in an elevator prompts a pop quiz. Fashion Theme: Tropical Island Resort Wear Collection For Tosh By Tosh
210	19	"Climate Change Comedian"	August 2, 2016	0.69
A man befriends a beer-chugging fish, the Tosh.0 staffers get embarrassing neck tattoos, and park ranger Brian Ettling raises climate change awareness with comedy. Fashion Theme: Tropical Island Resort Wear Collection For Tosh By Tosh
211	20	"Where Are They Now? Pt. 4"	August 9, 2016	0.69
A man underestimates a raccoon, former Web Redemption subjects return to the fold on the fourth installment of the Tosh.Oh, That's What They're Up To Now Redemption Reunion Spectacular., and Daniel applies some time-saving techniques to the summer games. Fashion Theme: Tropical Island Resort Wear Collection For Tosh By Tosh
212	21	"Anesthesia Girl"	September 27, 2016	0.703
A young woman who went on a vulgar tirade while experiencing the after-effects of anesthesia tries to salvage her good name. Fashion Theme: Danim in Denim
213	22	"Randalin The Pawg"	October 4, 2016	0.84
A girl battles a tree, a woman outsmarts a parking clamp, and Daniel gets personal with one of the biggest booties on the internet. Fashion Theme: Danim in Denim
214	23	"Free Stud Service"	October 11, 2016	0.74
Daniel comments on a pants-dropping dance video, interviews a man offering his sex services on the internet and gives an award to the worst town in the world. Fashion Theme: Danim in Denim
215	24	"Super Humman Stuntman"	October 18, 2016	0.68
Daniel studies the art of toad stacking, interviews a teen stuntman and tries a dangerous new version of ping-pong. Fashion Theme: Danim in Denim
216	25	"Food Surgeon"	October 25, 2016	0.64
A woman gets too close to the finish line at a race, a stuntman takes on Orange County's swimming pools, and the creepy clown trend meets its match. Fashion Theme: Danim in Denim
217	26	"Bong Lord"	November 1, 2016	0.57
A woman downs an entire stick of butter, the Internet’s preeminent bong smoker gets a checkup, and a fan’s email presents a chance for mischief. Fashion Theme: Danim in Denim
218	27	"Tosh.0-lection Special"	November 8, 2016	0.65
Daniel covers all the big issues of the 2016 election, learns some surprising truths from a conspiracy theorist and tries to get inside the mind of the average voter. Fashion Theme: Danim in Denim
219	28	"Makeup Jake"	November 15, 2016	0.81
A performer finds a new use for a mechanical bull, a teenage makeup guru lends Daniel his expertise, and Daniel charts the rise and fall of the mannequin challenge. Fashion Theme: Danim in Denim
220	29	"Kate's Food Challenge"	November 22, 2016	0.76
A gang of raccoons finds a doting fan, a competitive eater goes to a theme restaurant, and Daniel's viewers bombard him with Tosh doppelgangers. Fashion Theme: Danim in Denim
221	30	"The Best of Season 8"	November 29, 2016	0.79
A sea lion finds its way into a fishing net, Daniel reflects on 2016, and some overzealous Tosh.0 fans get blocked. Fashion Theme: Danim in Denim

=== Season 9 (2017) ===
No. overall	No. in season	Title	Original release date	U.S. viewers (millions)
222	1	"Nut Shot Zach"	February 7, 2017	0.82
Daniel debuts his most stainable wardrobe ever; has a ball with a guy who should be arrested for testicular manslaughter; goads his fans into tormenting a network executive. Fashion Theme: The White Season
223	2	"Drone Wife Cheat"	February 14, 2017	0.65
A dog trots out its prettiest outfit, a man takes the high-tech route while tailing his wife, and Daniel gets in a question at a White House press briefing. Fashion Theme: The White Season
224	3	"Blind Film Critic"	February 21, 2017	0.64
Daniel invites a blind film critic to his Oscar viewing party; visits the fallen hero of hotel pool jumping; introduces a little ditty that's sure to get your toes tapping. Fashion Theme: The White Season
225	4	"Spiritual Tasha Mama"	February 28, 2017	0.64
A communications director gets a little too handsy, YouTube's most prominent breastfeeder bares her soul, and an Alabama driver goes off-road. Fashion Theme: The White Season
226	5	"Mark 5"	March 7, 2017	0.63
A man gets friendly with a beehive, a music producer with dubious credentials shows off his crib, and Daniel loses to a girl. Fashion Theme: The White Season
227	6	"Blix The Merman"	March 14, 2017	0.76
Senior citizens have fun with balloons, Daniel catches a merman, and Tosh.0 takes on the flat Earth conspiracy theorists. Fashion Theme: The White Season
228	7	"Forever Leather"	March 21, 2017	0.62
Suburban kids test the limits of a trampoline, a leather salesman speaks his mind, and Daniel takes down some local restaurants. Fashion Theme: The White Season
229	8	"Buff Correll"	March 28, 2017	0.66
A little girl pisses off the wrong monkey, a gun safety trainer makes a fool of himself, and the rich stick it to the poor. Fashion Theme: The White Season
230	9	"Jedi Realist"	April 4, 2017	0.62
A British bloke attempts a not-so-daring jump, a Jedi uses the teachings of "Star Wars" in his real life, and Daniel makes his own version of a National Geographic show. Fashion Theme: The White Season
231	10	"Football-to-the-Face Girl"	April 11, 2017	0.63
Strange sights abound at the Thailand Piercing Festival, a college student takes a football to the face, and Daniel reveals some surprising behind-the-scenes secrets. Fashion Theme: The White Season
232	11	"Ricky Berwick"	June 6, 2017	0.58
A young man finds a mischievous use for mustard, Daniel guest stars on a wild YouTube star's new TV show, and the Tosh.0 staff takes fidget spinning to the next level. Fashion Theme: The Summer of Short Pants Featuring Dan's Gams
233	12	"Golf Fight"	June 13, 2017	0.52
Two golfers get into an embarrassing fight, an army of naked women shows how to stage a protest, and Daniel throws himself a gender reveal party. Fashion Theme: The Summer of Short Pants Featuring Dan's Gams
234	13	"Arrested For Pranks"	June 20, 2017	0.63
A prankster gets in trouble with the law, a boy unleashes a blood-curdling battle cry, and Daniel reveals why you shouldn't shoot a refrigerator full of explosives. Fashion Theme: The Summer of Short Pants Featuring Dan's Gams
235	14	"Singing Math Teacher"	June 27, 2017	0.64
Daniel unveils some responsible drinking games and reminds us why alligators are dangerous, and a former math teacher channels his inner rock star. Fashion Theme: The Summer of Short Pants Featuring Dan's Gams
236	15	"On Da River"	July 11, 2017	0.65
A religious guy explains the mathematical significance of ketchup, a man has a rematch with a rope swing, and Daniel goes angling with the hosts of an unusual fishing show. Fashion Theme: The Summer of Short Pants Featuring Dan's Gams
237	16	"Larry Enticer"	July 18, 2017	0.59
A motorcycle stunt goes awry, an elephant decides it doesn't want a particular man walking behind it, and Daniel sits down with Canada's top mullet-sporting daredevil. Fashion Theme: The Summer of Short Pants Featuring Dan's Gams
238	17	"Breatharian"	July 25, 2017	0.55
An extremely curvy man lubes up, a guy draws a penis with his voice, and Daniel sits down with a guru who eats air. Fashion Theme: The Summer of Short Pants Featuring Dan's Gams
239	18	"Long Leg Girl"	August 1, 2017	0.65
A dangerous new trend sweeps public golf courses, a raccoon turns out to be less than friendly, and Daniel works out with a woman who may have the longest legs in America. Fashion Theme: The Summer of Short Pants Featuring Dan's Gams
240	19	"UCF Baseball Player"	August 8, 2017	0.71
Daniel takes a tone-deaf pitcher out to a ball game, meets the internet's premier animal impressionist and discovers a new method to stop fights in the office. Fashion Theme: The Summer of Short Pants Featuring Dan's Gams
241	20	"Tosh.Oh That's What They're Up To Now Pt. 5"	August 15, 2017	0.65
Coating a man in cinnamon turns out to be a terrible idea, a funeral gets the rave treatment, and Daniel catches up with Web Redemption recipients from years past in the fifth Tosh.Oh That's What They're Up To Now Redemption Reunion Spectacular. Fashion Theme: The Summer of Short Pants Featuring Dan's Gams
242	21	"Zakar Twins"	September 19, 2017	0.59
Daniel discusses foot care, sits down with Iraqi twin brothers Michael and Zach Zakar and gets his fashion choices shamed by his audience. Fashion Theme: Autumn Hues Every Tues
243	22	"Chop and Steele"	September 26, 2017	0.65
Daniel sits down with a pair of fake fitness experts, puts his rope swing away for the winter and tries to seduce naked tree lovers. Fashion Theme: Autumn Hues Every Tues
244	23	"Tourette's Comedian"	October 3, 2017	0.58
Daniel sits down with a comedian who has Tourette's syndrome, discovers a hypnotizing new sport and starts a height war with his fellow celebrities. Fashion Theme: Autumn Hues Every Tues
245	24	"Spidergirl"	October 10, 2017	0.58
Daniel taps into the psyche of a death-defying urban explorer, attempts a freestyle rap and discovers a new use for drones. Fashion Theme: Autumn Hues Every Tues
246	25	"Nino Brown"	October 17, 2017	0.66
Daniel shows he's quicker than a bear, proves ketchup is good on everything and talks to Miami-based rapper and philosopher Nino Brown about women and grapes. Fashion Theme: Autumn Hues Every Tues
247	26	"Poppa Pipes"	October 24, 2017	0.62
Daniel learns about a risque way to play with lasers, helps men with their Instagram photos and asks fitness buff Poppa Pipes about his unique style. Fashion Theme: Autumn Hues Every Tues
248	27	"Lactatia"	October 31, 2017	0.50
Daniel sits down with nine-year-old drag queen Lactatia, hosts the disgusting game show "What's in Your Body?" and highlights inventive ways to carve a pumpkin. Fashion Theme: Autumn Hues Every Tues
249	28	"Mississippi State Fan"	November 7, 2017	0.66
Daniel meets a dedicated MSU cowbell ringer, introduces a responsible way to help out children and puts his efforts into raising money for a cat's butthole. Fashion Theme: Autumn Hues Every Tues
250	29	"ASMR Thanksgiving"	November 14, 2017	0.69
A moth terrorizes an innocent gas station employee, celebrities pretend to be relatable, and Daniel celebrates Thanksgiving with an ASMR artist who loves to eat on camera. Fashion Theme: Autumn Hues Every Tues
251	30	"Best of Season 9"	November 21, 2017	0.68
Daniel takes on skateboarders, revisits the best moments of Season 9 and stars in his very own Hallmark Channel Christmas movie. Fashion Theme: Autumn Hues Every Tues

=== Season 10 (2018) ===
No. overall	No. in season	Title	Original release date	U.S. viewers (millions)
252	1	"Lili Hayes"	March 27, 2018	0.54
On the Season 10 premiere, Daniel meets the only old person who should be allowed on Instagram and promotes faux healthy living with his new wardrobe Fashion Theme: Athleisure For Your Pleasure
253	2	"Bear Attack"	April 3, 2018	0.59
Daniel meets a man who became trail mix for bears, talks to the most talented sound machine who isn't from Miami and runs down a list of Hollywood's most horrifying hooves. Fashion Theme: Athleisure For Your Pleasure
254	3	"WinDgoe"	April 10, 2018	0.57
Daniel meets a guy who invented a bike that breaks the sound barrier, a chef whose favorite kitchen utensil is her mouth and a bachelor who would never pass a background check for "The Bachelor." Fashion Theme: Athleisure For Your Pleasure
255	4	"Ticket Girl"	April 17, 2018	0.53
Daniel saves a driver from suffering a thermal and mental breakdown, proves that knives are dangerous in the right hands and learns how to speak pruper Angloosh good. Fashion Theme: Athleisure For Your Pleasure
256	5	"Rhoda On The Scene"	April 24, 2018	0.69
Daniel Tosh interviews an indie-newswoman, demonstrates how marriage is the leading cause of back pain, and tackles a life-or-death situation. Fashion Theme: Athleisure For Your Pleasure
257	6	"Teenage Bitcoin Millionaire"	May 1, 2018	0.53
Daniel invests heavily in a cryptocurrency kid, unites the world through alcohol poisoning and learns that comedy plus math equals a huge waste of time. Fashion Theme: Athleisure For Your Pleasure
258	7	"Cussing Preacher"	May 8, 2018	0.63
Daniel worships with a profanity-loving pastor and argues somewhere over the rainbow with a mental munchkin. Fashion Theme: Athleisure For Your Pleasure
259	8	"Knee Shred Girl"	May 15, 2018	0.55
Daniel meets a cheerleader whose knee buckled under pressure, fine-tunes his already flawless face and wonders if a question is really a question if it doesn't have an answer. Fashion Theme: Athleisure For Your Pleasure
260	9	"Mr. E's Life Hacks"	May 22, 2018	0.55
Daniel meets the world's loneliest life hacker, belts out some 8-bit bangers and offers a friendly reminder that you can never trust the white man. Fashion Theme: Athleisure For Your Pleasure
261	10	"Woah Vicky"	May 29, 2018	0.56
Daniel meets a strong African-American woman named Woah Vicky, attends a big-ass born-again baptism and offers the heartfelt apology you've been waiting for. Fashion Theme: Athleisure For Your Pleasure
262	11	"Web Redemption Reunion Spectacular"	September 18, 2018	0.64
Daniel catches up with a good Samaritan and "What What (In the Butt)" songwriter Samwell, hires a contemporary dance duo and gets inspired by an animal abuse protester. Fashion Theme: Tosh.Flow
263	12	"Mack The Trans Wrestler"	September 25, 2018	0.62
The strongest man in girls' high school wrestling helps Daniel cram his liberal agenda down your throat; plus, Daniel discovers a magical new way to scar your kids for life and lists a who's who of celebrities he'd do. Fashion Theme: Tosh.Flow
264	13	"Paul Flart"	October 2, 2018	0.49
Daniel awards a security guard the Purple Fart for breaking wind in the line of duty, proves that the only safe trampoline is no trampoline and gives credit where credit is due: to himself. Fashion Theme: Tosh.Flow
265	14	"Naked Hanging Artist"	October 9, 2018	0.50
Daniel lends a helping hand to a naked Norwegian performance artist, gets the skinny on Tuna Box with Daddy Long Neck and talks tootsies. Fashion Theme: Tosh.Flow
266	15	"Flat-Earth Rocket Man"	October 16, 2018	0.55
Daniel takes one giant leap backward for mankind with a flat-earther, exposes some celebrity sellouts and shares how to stop flushing your money down the toilet. Fashion Theme: Tosh.Flow
267	16	"Crying Mukbanger"	October 23, 2018	0.51
Daniel breaks bread with a cry baby, explains why tweeting is more important than voting and finds out who's down with O.P.P. Fashion Theme: Tosh.Flow
268	17	"Deafies in Drag"	October 30, 2018	0.55
On a super scary Halloween episode, Daniel talks to some deaf drag queens, treats us to a few tasteless costumes and proves once and for all that ghosts are 100% real. Fashion Theme: Tosh.Flow
269	18	"Adrenaline Junkie"	November 6, 2018	0.49
Daniel helps an adrenaline junkie OD, introduces you to the filthiest perverts on the internet, and offers live, up-to-the-minute election results you can trust. Fashion Theme: Tosh.Flow
270	19	"One Hole or Two?"	November 13, 2018	0.51
Daniel settles the internet's most heated hole debate, introduces new sports that should be sweeping the nation and presents the return of the most unsatisfying segment on TV. Fashion Theme: Tosh.Flow
271	20	"Best of Season 10"	November 20, 2018	0.55
Daniel shares some 2018 memories he can't wait to repress and checks in with his favorite foulmouthed football analyst. Fashion Theme: Tosh.Flow

=== Season 11 (2019) ===
No. overall	No. in season	Title	Original release date	U.S. viewers (millions)
272	1	"Hard Rock Nick"	March 19, 2019	0.58
On the season premiere of Tosh.0, Hard Rock Nick proves that it's possible to hate both the player and the game, and Daniel pulls a Felicity Huffman and ruins his fans' futures. Fashion Theme: Eating Out-Fits
273	2	"Tirdy Works"	March 26, 2019	0.60
Daniel paints the town brown with a crafty turd burglar, outsources his bracket to Asia and demonstrates how to have some good, clean fun with a box cutter. Fashion Theme: Eating Out-Fits
274	3	"Pony Play"	April 2, 2019	0.58
Daniel meets a man who's into pony play, grants his own birthday wish and scrapes the makeup off celebrities. Fashion Theme: Eating Out-Fits
275	4	"Energy Drink Reviewer"	April 9, 2019	0.59
Daniel meets America's most low-energy drink reviewer, crowns a less disturbing king of pop and decides who's the winner-winner when it comes to a particular chicken dinner. Fashion Theme: Eating Out-Fits
276	5	"Vape Bros"	April 16, 2019	0.53
Daniel hotboxes with a pair of vaping YouTubers, finds the saddest knight in the kingdom and asks you to decide where to stick the knife in. Fashion Theme: Eating Out-Fits
277	6	"Sneeze Guy"	April 23, 2019	0.46
Daniel discovers the sexy side of sneezing, installs a state-of-the-art office security system that's 100% impenetrable and finds out whether British people's road rage is as bad as their comedy. Fashion Theme: Eating Out-Fits
278	7	"Big Arms Guy"	April 30, 2019	0.45
Daniel meets a man with extreme extremities, chats with Canada's saltiest chip aficionados, and reveals the show's most questionable segment. Fashion Theme: Eating Out-Fits
279	8	"Mom-Son Sex Podcast"	May 7, 2019	0.39
Daniel has the sex talk with some pervy podcasters, drops bombs on Internet moms, and sets his dumbest world record. Fashion Theme: Eating Out-Fits
280	9	"Golf Girl Trick Shots"	May 14, 2019	0.45
Daniel talks trick shots with an Instagram golf goddess; vows to broadcast the Robert Kraft sex tape, and ask the question about people being racist wherever bigotry rears its ugly head. Fashion Theme: Eating Out-Fits
281	10	"ToshCon: Where Are They Now?"	May 21, 2019	0.47
Daniel assembles a dream team of the shows greatest guests, opens the heavenly gates of Tosh to a "Book of Mormon" thumper and after 11 years, finally lets it all out. Fashion Theme: Eating Out-Fits
282	11	"SteveWillDoIt"	September 17, 2019	0.46
Daniel examines a swinging tattoo convention, tests social media star SteveWillDoIt's limits, talks sports in Around the Horn.0 and unveils the Aussie Viddie of the Weekie. Fashion Theme: Monochromosexual (Pink)
283	12	"Brother K"	September 24, 2019	0.64
Daniel meets with "intactivist" Brother K, teams up with Dom Irrera to quiz a focus group about racist terms and examines a video of a dog dancing to an accordion. Fashion Theme: Monochromosexual (Maroon)
284	13	""I Eat Ass" Free Speech Defender"	October 1, 2019	0.41
Daniel gets his staff fired up for tape day, interviews an ass-eating First Amendment protector and is unnerved by videos of a man who pies himself in the face. Fashion Theme: Monochromosexual (Gray)
285	14	"Misha"	October 8, 2019	0.58
Daniel reviews a college student's shocking night, meets a 12-year-old with a love for songs about video games, and reveals what it's really like to attend a live taping. Fashion Theme: Monochromosexual (Navy Blue)
286	15	"BarSoap Guy"	October 15, 2019	0.48
Daniel welcomes his best-smelling guest ever and wealth-shames young people on TikTok. Fashion Theme: Monochromosexual (Magenta)
287	16	"Burping Girl"	October 22, 2019	0.47
Daniel takes inspiration from a woman who sprayed milk from her breasts at a music festival, is taught how to slackline at the office by Reckless Ben and meets with a renowned burp fetishist. Fashion Theme: Monochromosexual (Gray)
288	17	"Super B*tch"	October 29, 2019	0.43
Daniel looks at a gross way to maximize soup intake, meets a viral superhero with an anti-bullying message and watches parents traumatize their kids for Halloween. Fashion Theme: Monochromosexual (Black)
289	18	"Pot Brothers At Law"	November 5, 2019	0.48
Daniel breaks down a video of a father-son napping duo, meets two brothers who practice law and have a penchant for pot, and helps Todd Glass tame his prank show. Fashion Theme: Monochromosexual (Beige)
290	19	"Dumped Wife's Revenge"	November 12, 2019	0.53
Daniel helps someone seek revenge on their exes, hosts a podcast about a washed-up wrestler and wears an enormous scarf. Fashion Theme: Monochromosexual (Black & White, panchromatic)
291	20	"2019 Year in Review"	November 19, 2019	0.49
In the Season 11 finale, Daniel finds out if he won Employee of the Year. Fashion Theme: Monochromosexual (Red)

=== Season 12 (2020) ===
No. overall	No. in season	Title	Original release date	U.S. viewers (millions)
292	1	"R.I.P. Castro"	September 15, 2020	0.36
Daniel explains ballistic trajectory, gives a heartfelt tribute to his departed dog, breaks down a zero gravity upchuck and has a virtual reality reunion with a deceased loved one. Fashion Theme: Season of Mourning
293	2	"Rebecca Black"	September 22, 2020	0.34
Daniel gets handsy during his COVID-19 test, sits down for a Tiny Desk concert with Web Legend Rebecca Black and tries to discern if items around the Tosh.0 office are actually cake. Fashion Theme: Season of Mourning
294	3	"Trap Gardener"	September 29, 2020	0.33
Daniel reacts to a painful horse run-in, gets unconventional gardening tips from viral plant enthusiast Freedella De Vil and takes inspiration from a Turkish chef's no-look cooking approach. Fashion Theme: Season of Mourning
295	4	"Cat Food Reviewer"	October 6, 2020	0.32
Daniel breaks down a video of a water buffalo rampage, interviews a YouTube cat food reviewer who doesn't own a cat and uses the power of energy healing to harass his staff. Fashion Theme: Season of Mourning
296	5	"Bodybuilder Vs"	October 13, 2020	0.42
Daniel has unanswered questions about a flooded motel, interviews a man who's built up his body only so he can destroy it, and pitches a product to help public poopers. Fashion Theme: Season of Mourning
297	6	"Popstar Nima"	October 20, 2020	0.43
Daniel receives high tech communion, has coffee with an overtly sexual pop singer, and goes toe-to-toe with a viral painting star. Fashion Theme: Season of Mourning
298	7	"Rax Roast Beef Guy"	October 27, 2020	0.27
Daniel calls 911 regarding a superhero being "attacked" at a barbecue, meets a man obsessed with seasonal Halloween stores and reveals unexpected objects extracted from peoples' bodies. Fashion Theme: Season of Mourning
299	8	"Nill the Cat"	November 10, 2020	0.35
Daniel ensures proper COVID protocols are followed at a school dance, learns Siri's kinks, talks to a tech-savvy man who dresses like a cat and analyzes the 2020 U.S. presidential election. Fashion Theme: Season of Mourning
300	9	"Ruairi Rap"	November 17, 2020	0.37
Daniel cleans up the mess left by a viral pee video, introduces a 13-year-old rap critic to some classic tracks and shines a light on some celebrities' side gigs. Fashion Theme: Season of Mourning
301	10	"The Masked CeWEBrity Singer"	November 24, 2020	0.48
Daniel breaks down security footage of a hostile hotel check-in, catches up with some past musical guests and looks back at the year 2020. Fashion Theme: Season of Mourning
