= Keyboard Cat =

Internet meme

- A screenshot from the Keyboard Cat video
- Directed by: Charlie Schmidt
- Produced by: Brad O'Farrell
- Starring: Fatso (a.k.a. Keyboard Cat)
- Release dates: 1984 (Fatso); 2009 (Bento); 2019 (Skinny); 2026 (Presley)
- Running time: 0:54
- Country: United States

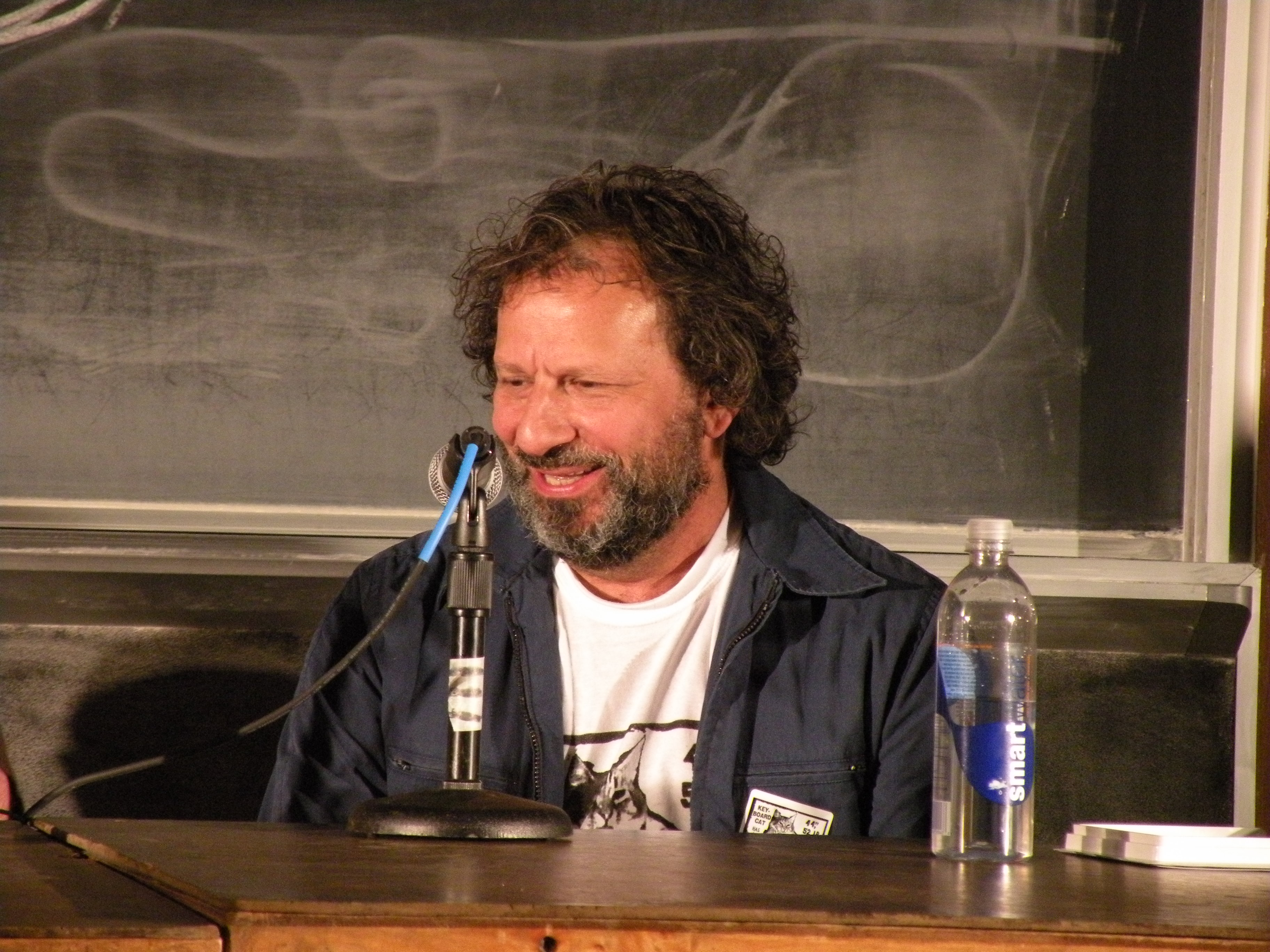
Charlie Schmidt, who made the Keyboard Cat video

Keyboard Cat is a viral video and internet meme. Its original form was a video made in 1984 by Charlie Schmidt of his cat Fatso seemingly playing a musical keyboard (though manipulated by Schmidt off-camera) to a cheery tune. While Schmidt had uploaded the video himself to YouTube in 2007, Brad O'Farrell, with Schmidt's permission, appended the video to the end of a blooper video uploaded in 2009 as if to have the cat "play" the person offstage after the gaffe as they had done in vaudeville. The idea of this quickly expanded on the Internet by numerous other users, typically under the name "Play Him Off, Keyboard Cat", and became a popular meme on YouTube.

Although Fatso died around 1999, Schmidt has since adopted other cats that have become new "Keyboard Cats", including Bento, Skinny, and the current Keyboard Cat, Presley.

== History ==
=== Recording and upload ===
The various Keyboard Cats have been owned by Charlie Schmidt of Spokane, Washington, United States. The first Keyboard Cat video, created by Schmidt in 1984, featured Fatso, a male cat born in 1978. Fatso's death was previously reported as occurring in 1987. During a 2026 livestream, Schmidt and his wife Joanne discussed Fatso's death date. Joanne said that the previously reported 1987 date was wrong, recalling that Fatso was still alive when their daughter, born in 1998, was an infant. She estimated that Fatso died around 1999. Schmidt had made the video from a 1984 VHS recording (that was later digitized) of Fatso wearing an infant's blue T-shirt and "playing" an upbeat rhythm on an Ensoniq Mirage sampling keyboard. Off-screen, Schmidt was manipulating Fatso's paws as to appear to be playing the piano, with the shirt used to cover his hands doing this. Schmidt had only made the video out of boredom. Schmidt digitized and posted the video to YouTube under the title "charlie schmidt's "cool cat"" in June 2007. Schmidt later changed the title to "Charlie Schmidt's Keyboard Cat! - THE ORIGINAL!" as the meme began to spread. By September 2025, this video had received over 81 million views.

=== Initial popularity ===
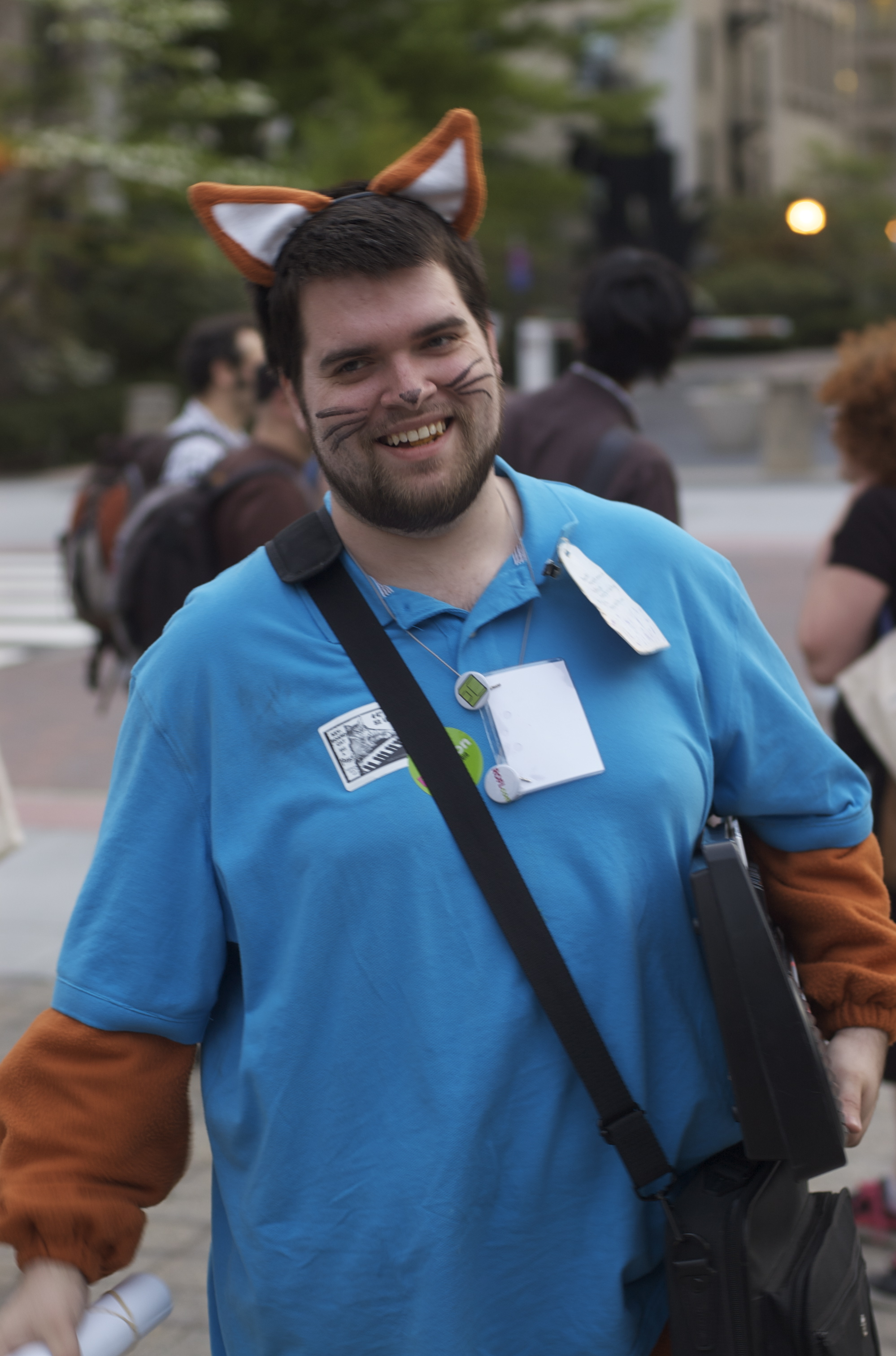
Brad O'Farrell at ROFLcon II

Brad O'Farrell, who was the syndication manager of the video website My Damn Channel, obtained Schmidt's permission to reuse the footage, appending it to the end of a blooper video to "play" that person offstage after the mistake or gaffe in a similar manner as getting the hook in the days of vaudeville. The appending of Schmidt's video to other blooper and other viral videos became popular, with such videos usually accompanied with the title Play Him Off, Keyboard Cat or a variant. "Keyboard Cat" was ranked No. 2 on Current TV's list of 50 Greatest Viral Videos.

The first such "Keyboard Cat" video, entitled "Play Him Off, Keyboard Cat", was created by Brad O'Farrell, the syndication manager of the video website My Damn Channel. O'Farrell both secured Schmidt's permission to use footage and asked Schmidt to allow anyone to use the footage with or without permission. O'Farrell used the footage by appending it to the end of a video of a person in a wheelchair falling awkwardly off an escalator, with the appended Fatso footage appearing to "play" that person offstage in a similar manner as getting the hook in the days of vaudeville. O'Farrell had posted his video in February 2009, though this video had been removed from YouTube due to reported copyright violations.

O'Farrell used his connections on YouTube to help promote the video to be featured on the front page of YouTube, which caused other users to create similar videos based on "epic fail" videos already posted on YouTube, all appended with the Fatso footage and typically named in the same fashion. By May 2009, at least 200 videos had been created. The meme received boosts from media attention in May 2009 which included coverage in press outlets like the Associated Press, a tweet made by Ashton Kutcher to his one million followers, and by a reference on The Daily Show with Jon Stewart during a "toss" with Stephen Colbert.

Keyboard Cat references grew in the media throughout 2009, fully establishing it as a meme. At the 2009 MTV Movie Awards, Andy Samberg's opening monologue suggested that award winners whose speech went on too long would be played off by Keyboard Cat. Kato Kaelin also spoofed Keyboard Cat in a segment of Tosh.0 entitled "Keyboard Kato" in the series first episode. During Weezer's 2009 summer tour with Blink-182, Keyboard Cat would play the band off every night at the end of their set. The Nintendo DS game Scribblenauts was unveiled at E3 2009; the game has the player write out objects to summon to solve puzzles, one such being "Keyboard Cat", which helped to draw attention to the title due to the timeliness of the meme.

=== Aftermath ===
With the popularity of Keyboard Cat, Schmidt adopted a male cat named Bento who lived from 2008 to 2018, which was similar in appearance to Fatso and became "Keyboard Cat 2.0". Schmidt announced the next Keyboard Cat with a video of Bento "performing" as Fatso had done, called "Keyboard Cat REINCARNATED!" in March 2010. This video went to be used in a similar manner as the previous Keyboard Cat video.

Bento died in March 2018 at the age of 9, and received numerous tributes from the Internet. Schmidt at the time was not sure if he would bring another Keyboard Cat to the Internet. Schmidt announced in March 2019 that he had found his "Keyboard Cat 3.0" in Skinny, a male cat he had adopted in 2009 that was named after Fatso's older sister who died in 1985, and featured Skinny in a YouTube video. In 2026, Schmidt and his wife identified Presley as Keyboard Cat 4.0, the fourth Keyboard Cat.

In April 2020, the original channel the video was uploaded to was terminated after being hacked by a cryptocurrency business group. The channel was later reinstated, with the video "Keyboard Cat! - THE ORIGINAL!" reaching nearly 97 million views as of November 2026.

=== Notable uses ===
An Easter egg in Activision Blizzard's announcement for World of Warcraft: Cataclysm reveals the game's antagonist, Deathwing, playing a keyboard with the text "Keyboard Cataclysm: Play 'em Off, Deathwing". A teaser video from Ubisoft for its video game Splinter Cell: Conviction, entitled "Play Him Off, Keyboard Sam" parodies the Keyboard Cat theme. The Xbox Live Arcade remake of Earthworm Jim includes additional content, including one boss character inspired by Keyboard Cat.

The Keyboard Cat meme has been integrated into other memes, like Keycat and Keykitten. An 8-bit version of both the cat and the song have been created. Online clothing vendor Threadless sells a "Three Keyboard Cat Moon" T-shirt based on the infamous Three Wolf Moon design; the shirt design was one of the most popular that the company has had, and they have had difficulties in meeting the demand for the shirt. The shirt appeared in a television ad for the release of the PlayStation 3 Slim game console. G4TV's Attack of the Show held a "Great American Keyboard Cat Competition" to give viewers a chance to create their own Keyboard Cat-inspired art, with over one hundred pieces submitted. Several of the top works from this were given to the charity Kitten Rescue to be auctioned off through eBay. The MLB AL East Champion Tampa Bay Rays used a variation known as "Rays Keyboard Kitty" (they also had one called "DJ Kitty") to rouse the crowd during its late season run, using a similar cat in Rays gear in several segments. On April 1, 2011, YouTube released a video showing the "Top 5 Viral Pictures of 1911", including a parody of Keyboard Cat titled "Flugelhorn Feline".

There are also a number of videos in which other music has been substituted in for the original song. For example, at the height of the popularity of the podcast Serial, a YouTube video was released that showed Keyboard Cat "playing" the Serial theme song.

On the homepage of the popular online game Bin Weevils, one can get a glimpse of a large television screen at the Drive-In Cinema where a "bin pet"-ified Keyboard Cat can be seen.

In one example, Keyboard Cat was appended to the end of a segment of Desperate Lives (1982), a made-for-TV movie starring Helen Hunt showing the effects of drug use (with Keyboard Cat starting after Hunt's character falls out a window and suffers from overdosing); after the video, the submitter then superimposed Keyboard Cat in the music video for Hall & Oates' "You Make My Dreams". The music video segment has been jokingly called by some the "greatest music video ever". While the video still exists at YouTube, copyright issues with Warner Music Group have forced YouTube to disable the audio. The move has alerted groups concerned about copyrights and the remix culture to warn about potential limitation of creative expression through such actions.

During Super Bowl LVII, the original Keyboard Cat video was featured in YouTube TV's NFL Sunday Ticket advertisement, edited to show the cat "playing" the NFL Network theme music.

== Appearances in other media ==
In addition to the cats' use in the memes, the various Keyboard Cats have appeared in other media outlets, typically referencing the meme.

- A 2010 television advertisement for Wonderful Pistachios features Bento cracking one of the nuts during the song.
- In 2014, Jimmy Kimmel Live! produced the fake trailer for Ameowadeus, a parody of Amadeus in which Hamster On a Piano (played by Christoph Waltz) is envious of Keyboard Cat (Kevin Spacey) and his talents. The video costars Sir Ben Kingsley, Gary Oldman, Mandy Patinkin and Abbie Cornish, with Jimmy Kimmel himself appearing as Dramatic Chipmunk.
- Bento was featured in a 2014 cinema spot promoting the UK's EE telecom network, and the 2014 film Teenage Mutant Ninja Turtles briefly featured the original footage of Fatso.
- Bento also appeared and revealed herself to be a fan of the Carolina Panthers in a National Football League advertisement that first aired during Super Bowl XLIX.
- Bento was the halftime entertainment for the 2014 Puppy Bowl.
- The video was referenced in Survive the Internet, one of the minigames in The Jackbox Party Pack 4 (2017).
- In 2018, Family Guy, season 16, episode 18 (titled "HTTPete"), after millennial hipster Hammer dies while texting on a hoverboard, Peter remarks that it seems to be in poor taste to have hired Keyboard Cat to play at his funeral.
- The video was parodied in the 2022 video game Lego Star Wars: The Skywalker Saga.
- The video was referenced in the 2022 Disney Channel original series Hamster & Gretel.
- The video was referenced in a 2022 episode of the 1996 series Arthur, with a character mentioning "I've seen something like that with a dog playing a piano."

== Lawsuit ==
On June 21, 2011, Schmidt filed a lawsuit in Seattle Federal Court against Threadless for their 2009 line of Three Keyboard Cat Moon T-shirts, a send up of the then popular Three Wolf Moon meme, due to copyright infringement. Threadless counter-claimed by stating that Schmidt's copyright claim was not approved until September 22, 2010, more than a year after the production of the T-shirts, and that Schmidt had lost his copyright when he asked people to submit videos that paid tribute to Fatso. As of May 2013, this lawsuit has been settled.

In May 2013, Schmidt and Christopher Torres, the creator of Nyan Cat, jointly sued 5th Cell and Warner Bros. for copyright infringement and trademark infringement over the appearance of these characters without permission in the Scribblenauts series of video games. Torres and Schmidt have both registered copyrights on their characters and have pending trademark applications on the names. Meme manager Ben Clark manages them and Grumpy Cat, Scumbag Steve and Ridiculously Photogenic Guy. The suit was settled in September 2013, with Torres and Schmidt being paid for the use of the characters.

== See also ==
- Cats and the Internet
- Nora (cat) who played the piano
- List of individual cats
- List of Internet phenomena
