= City of Angels (Glee) =

- Glee episode
- Episode no.: Season 5 Episode 11
- Directed by: Elodie Keene
- Written by: Jessica Meyer
- Production code: 5ARC11
- Original air date: March 11, 2014

Guest appearances
- Amber Riley as Mercedes Jones; Mike O'Malley as Burt Hummel; Romy Rosemont as Carole Hudson-Hummel; NeNe Leakes as Roz Washington; Lauren Potter as Becky Jackson; Skylar Astin as Jean-Baptiste; Jackée as herself; Johanna Rohrback as herself; Marlee Matlin as herself

Episode chronology
← Previous "Trio"	Next → "100"
- Glee season 5

"City of Angels" is the eleventh episode of the fifth season of the American musical television series Glee, and the ninety-ninth episode overall. Written by Jessica Meyer and directed by Elodie Keene, it aired on Fox in the United States on March 11, 2014, and features New Directions defending their National Show Choir Championship in Los Angeles. This episode includes brief flashbacks to scenes showing the late Finn Hudson (Cory Monteith).

== Plot ==
Glee club director Will Schuester (Matthew Morrison) asks Sam Evans (Chord Overstreet) to be ready to act as a leader when New Directions travels to Los Angeles for the National Show Choir Competition. Carole Hudson-Hummel (Romy Rosemont) and Burt Hummel (Mike O'Malley), mother and step-father of the club's late co-director Finn Hudson (Cory Monteith), agree to chaperone New Directions on the trip in place of Emma, and remind the club members how much Finn cared about them.

New Directions arrives in Los Angeles, and are met there by former member Mercedes Jones (Amber Riley), who has been given a record deal by Sony. They are then confronted by rival show choir Throat Explosion and its intimidating leader Jean-Baptiste (Skylar Astin). Later, Ryder Lynn (Blake Jenner) speaks with Marley Rose (Melissa Benoist) because she has apparently given up on her dream of becoming a singer-songwriter. She has received no response to the songs she's been sending out to contests, and she tells him that she's planning to quit the glee club after Nationals. He and Jake Puckerman (Jacob Artist) are rooming together, and after the two affirm that they are actually friends despite their past rivalry for Marley, they conspire to give copies of Marley's songs to Mercedes, who tells Marley that the songs are good and she needs to pursue her musical dreams.

Tina Cohen-Chang (Jenna Ushkowitz) and Sam are with Carole and Burt, remembering past competitions, and Tina expresses regret that this will be their last one. Carole says that at least she will be here for this one—unstated is that Finn cannot be—but then apologizes. Later, however, she tells Burt that she doesn't think she can deal with seeing the competition, and the two decide to go to Laguna Beach instead.

That night, New Directions sneaks onto the stage of the auditorium, and Sam reveals that he brought Finn's plaque from the choir room to fulfill Finn's promise to be there with them at Nationals. Jean-Baptiste arrives, having made arrangements to use the auditorium for an all-night Throat Explosion rehearsal, and evicts New Directions. The next day, getting on New Directions' bus to go to Nationals, Sam can't find Finn's plaque in its case and accuses Jean-Baptiste of stealing it, though he denies doing so. Back on the bus, Sam gives a pep talk, telling everyone that Finn is there with them anyway.

At Nationals, the competition begins with the Amazonians show choir, after which Throat Explosion performs a mashup of "Mr. Roboto" and "Counting Stars", leaving the judges looking impressed and Sam and Blaine Anderson (Darren Criss) apprehensive. Backstage before they go on, Will starts giving New Directions some final encouragement, but Carole and Burt interrupt—they turned back when she came to realize Finn would want her to see them—and she and Burt tell them to "wipe the floor" with the competition.

New Directions starts with "More Than a Feeling" featuring Blaine and Tina, continues with Artie being highlighted in "America", and ends with Sam taking lead on "I Still Haven't Found What I'm Looking For", at which point Carole realizes that the set is made up of Finn's favorite songs. Afterward, while the group celebrates their performance, Sam is off by himself, and tearfully tells Will, "I did my best, Mr. Schue." When the results are announced, New Directions comes in second to Throat Explosion.

Back in Ohio, Finn's plaque has been returned by Jean-Baptiste, who discovered that one of the Throat Explosion members—now an ex-member—had stolen it. Carole and Burt come to the choir room, and she says that hearing them perform songs was healing for her, knowing that Finn will live on in them. The ceremony of putting the second-place trophy in the case is interrupted by Becky Jackson (Lauren Potter), who summons Will to see principal Sue Sylvester (Jane Lynch).

Sue is just congratulating cheerleading coach Roz Washington (NeNe Leakes) for having won her Nationals competition, but her news for Will is bleak: since he didn't win, and despite her affection for him, her duties as principal require her to disband the glee club along with several other school activities due to budgetary constraints. The bad news travels quickly: Kurt Hummel (Chris Colfer) tells feuding fellow McKinley graduates Rachel Berry (Lea Michele) and Santana Lopez (Naya Rivera) of the club's demise during their shift at the Spotlight Diner in New York City.

== Production ==
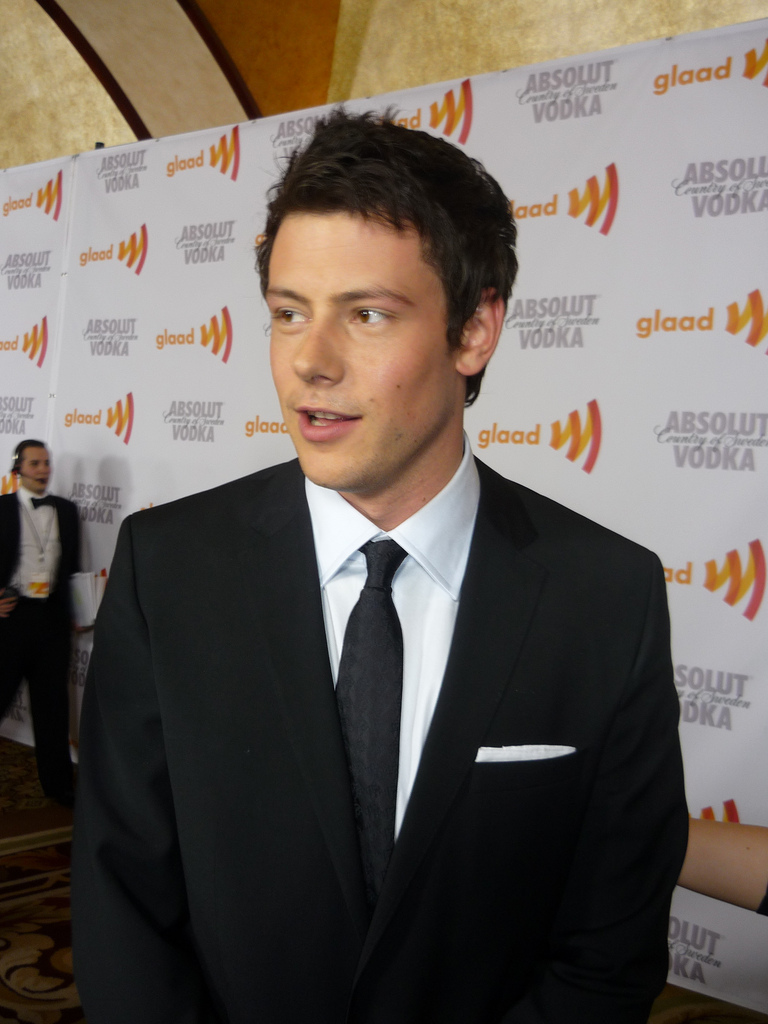
This episode features brief flashbacks to scenes with Finn Hudson (Cory Monteith)

The episode was in production by December 6, 2013. The scenes at the Nationals competition were filmed on December 17 and 18, and filming for the episode continued for at least another day.

A trio of guest stars are appearing as themselves in this episode, acting as judges of the National Show Choir Championship: Marlee Matlin, Jackée and Johanna Rohrback. In addition, Skylar Astin appears as the lead singer of rival glee club Throat Explosion, Jean-Baptiste.

Recurring characters in this episode include former New Directions member Mercedes Jones (Riley), Finn's mother and stepfather, Carole Hudson-Hummel (Rosemont) and Burt Hummel (O'Malley), McKinley cheerleading coach Roz Washington (Leakes) and cheerleader Becky Jackson (Potter).

Seven songs from the episode are being released on a six-track EP with the same title as the episode. These include: Randy Newman's "I Love L.A." performed by Morrison, Criss, Overstreet, Kevin McHale, and Jacob Artist; "Vacation" by The Go-Go's; a mashup of Styx's "Mr. Roboto" and OneRepublic's "Counting Stars" featuring Astin; and three songs performed by New Directions at Nationals: Boston's "More Than a Feeling" featuring Criss and Ushkowitz, Neil Diamond's "America" featuring McHale, Overstreet, Becca Tobin and Alex Newell, and U2's "I Still Haven't Found What I'm Looking For" featuring Criss, McHale, Overstreet and Ushkowitz.

== Reception ==
=== Ratings ===
"City of Angels" received a series-low-tying 0.9/3 Nielsen rating/share in the 18–49 demographic and attracted 2.30 million American viewers during its initial broadcast, a significant decrease over the prior episode's 1.0/3 rating/share and 2.68 million viewers on March 5, 2014.

Including DVR viewership, the episode's 18–49 rating was raised to 1.5.

=== Critical reception ===
"City of Angels" received generally positive reviews from critics. Brandon Nowallk from The AV Club gave the episode B− stating "'City of Angels' is the perfect capstone for Glee's middle period. Everything I've been saying about this season is here." Although he gave negative review about Jake, Ryder and Marley's subplot saying "When the characters aren't guided by Schmaltz, they're at the mercy of the writers misanthrophy".

Many critics enjoyed the New Directions tribute songs to Finn Hudson with Todd VanDerWerff stating "Part of what's powerful about this episode is that the tribute doesn't have any dialogue. Yes, the episode starts by invoking Finn, it brings Finn's parents to Los Angeles and it even makes a subplot out of Finn's portrait, but the centrepiece is the a three song tribute that you don't even know is a tribute until the final number. Jodi Walker from Entertainment Weekly's praised the "New Directions tribute to the legacy of Finn Hudson and all that he brought to the Glee club". Although he said he was never going to see the new cast.

Vulture gave the episode 4 stars "it's not mawkish or over the top. It's gentle, impossible to look away from and nuanced; it's worthy of an Emmy consideration" and also praised Mike O' Malley's performance as Burt "Mike O' Malley as ever, is anchor, a perfect blend of gruff and kind."
