= Scarlet Takes a Tumble =

2008 viral video

Reynolds falling off of a table in "Scarlet Takes a Tumble"

"Scarlet Takes a Tumble" is a viral video uploaded to YouTube in 2008. In it, Paige Reynolds, a teenage girl, falls off of a table while singing. By 2009, the video had more than 10 million views; as of 2025, it has more than 33 million. Reaction videos to it also became popular online and Reynolds appeared on various talk shows to discuss its virality.

== Publication and virality ==
"Scarlet Takes a Tumble" is a four-minute-long video showing 15-year-old Paige Reynolds ("Scarlet") from the Roebuck neighborhood of Birmingham, Alabama singing an improvised song, putting on a pair of wedges, stepping onto a coffee table, and then falling off of it. She then rolls around on the ground in pain before saying to the camera, "That hurt." It was recorded using the webcam on her mother's laptop while she waited to go to choir rehearsal. According to Reynolds, she showed the video to her sister, who found it funny and asked her to email it to her so that she could show her friends. Due to the video's file size being too large to be emailed, Reynolds uploaded it to the YouTube channel "purple-bunny", intending to make it private and send the link to her sister once the upload finished but forgetting.

"Scarlet Takes a Tumble" soon went viral and was described in the 2023 documentary film Fantastic Machine as "one of the first viral videos" and a "global sensation". It had more than 10 million views by December 2009, which rose to 11.8 million four months later. It also inspired multiple parodies.

=== Reactions and media appearances ===
Reynolds stated in 2019 that she cried "a lot" when she first found out that "Scarlet Takes a Tumble" had gone viral, describing the experience as "surreal" and "a hard thing to come to terms with, confidence-wise" due to reading comments calling her names and racial epithets. Singer Justin Bieber described himself as a fan of the video in 2009, calling it "hilarious". For The New York Times Magazine, Sam Anderson described it as "a classic of home-brewed slapstick", while comedian Christian Hull stated for The Guardian in 2021 that it was "just so relatable" and had "stuck with [him]" after watching it. Two reaction videos to "Scarlet Takes a Tumble"—one of YouTuber Kevin Christiani and another titled "Funniest Reaction to 'Scarlet Takes a Tumble' Video" of a man laughing at it at a birthday party—each became popular and separately garnered two million views by 2011, with Christiani's also inspiring reaction videos to his reaction video.

Reynolds made her first television appearance on the talk show Maury to discuss the video's popularity. She was later interviewed on The Jay Leno Show in 2009 and on The Jennifer Hudson Show in 2023. She also appeared on the Daniel Tosh–hosted Comedy Central series Tosh.0, where she appeared in a "web redemption" segment to recreate the video.

== Aftermath and legacy ==
Reynolds later attended Oakwood University, where she was part of the school's choir, and graduated from Andrews University with a degree in psychology. In 2023, "Scarlet Takes a Tumble" had more than 30 million views. Also that year, Reynolds posted about the video on her TikTok account, PaigeyP, and shared a video of herself wearing the wedges from the video. As of 2023, Reynolds works as a therapist.
