= Double Rainbow (viral video) =

2010 viral video by Paul Vasquez

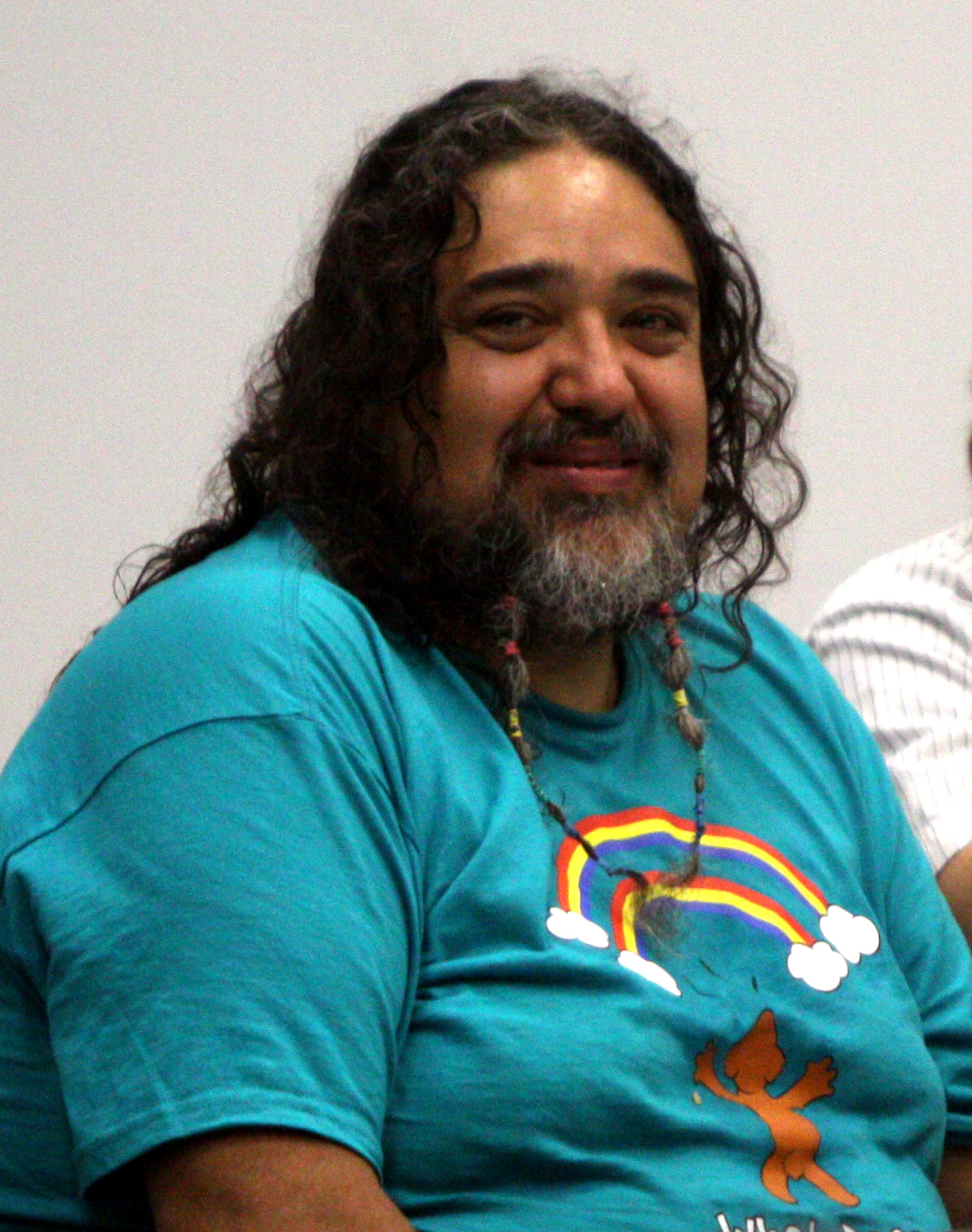
Paul Vasquez in June 2012

"Double Rainbow" is a viral video filmed by Paul "Bear" Vasquez (September 5, 1962 – May 9, 2020). The clip, which he filmed in 2010 in his front yard, near Yosemite National Park in California, shows his ecstatic reaction to a double rainbow. As of October 2026, Vasquez's video had accumulated more than 52 million views on YouTube.

== Biography ==
Vasquez was raised in East Los Angeles to a family of Mexican and Native American descent. He grew up in a rough household, with his mother described as physically abusive. Initially working for the California Conservation Corps, Vazquez later became a Los Angeles County firefighter. After two years, he re-settled near Yosemite in 1985,

eventually buying an eight-acre (3.2 ha) plot. He was married with two children, before divorcing, becoming a truck driver, and participating in a single mixed martial arts bout.

Vasquez lived on a forested property in Mariposa County, California, approximately 10 miles (16 km) from Yosemite, where he operated a farm with the help of passing volunteers and uploaded videos of his daily life. Vasquez was a prolific uploader, publishing several thousand YouTube videos during his lifetime. In a 2019 video, he mentioned uploading fifteen years' worth of videos dated in advance, leaving his YouTube channel still active as of 2026.

In a 2014 interview, Vasquez stated that he was a very spiritual person, and that 'the video is me understanding that I'm in the presence of God'. He clarified that he is not religious, as he does not believe in 'intermediaries'. Vasquez claimed that before the incident, he had been attempting to live as a starving artist and was in a deep depression, having quit his job six years prior. The success of the video had allowed him to live comfortably again.

=== Death ===
In a May 3, 2020, Facebook post, Vasquez spoke of feeling feverish and having trouble breathing. However, he refrained from going to a hospital, as he looked forward to reincarnating and "enjoying the ride". On May 9, Vasquez died in the emergency room of John C. Fremont Hospital in Mariposa, California. He was 57. Vasquez was tested for COVID-19 but no results were publicly released.

== History ==
The amateur video shows the view from Vasquez's property into the skies above the Yosemite Valley on January 8, 2010. After moving away from several trees that interfere with the scene, Vazquez enjoys an unobstructed view of a semicircular double rainbow. Vasquez's reaction captures his intense emotional excitement; he weeps with joy and moans ecstatically, uttering phrases such as "Double rainbow all the way across the sky," "What does this mean?" and "Too much!"

Vasquez posted the video to YouTube himself as user Hungrybear9562 (now Yosemitebear62) on January 8, 2010. On July 3, comedian and late-night talk show host Jimmy Kimmel linked to the video in a post on Twitter, saying that he and a friend had declared it the "funniest video in the world." The video quickly gained over one million views.

A July 16 feature on the video by CNN.com stated that the video had gained 4.8 million views. The video gained Vasquez a feature on the comedy show Tosh.0. ABC News describes the video as "a three-and-a-half-minute emotional journey," with Vasquez confirming his sobriety during recording.

On July 26, 2010, Bear was interviewed by Kimmel on Jimmy Kimmel Live! On the December 16 episode, he was awarded Video of the Year and appeared in a video short created by the show for the event.

== Developments ==
On July 5, 2010, the Gregory Brothers auto-tuned the video under the name "Double Rainbow Song". Their video has since gotten over 41 million views and has become a viral video in itself, almost surpassing the original in number of views. The song was covered by Amanda Palmer, Jimmy Fallon (as Neil Young) and The Axis of Awesome during a live recording of a charity show in the UK.

In 2011, Vasquez appeared in a commercial for Vodafone New Zealand, parodying the video.

The video appears as the first scene of the 2013 movie We're the Millers. Two years earlier, Vasquez had appeared in Jennifer Aniston's ad for Smartwater.

On May 9, 2016, Vasquez appeared on the Slooh.com live broadcast of the Transit of Mercury.

This video was featured in YouTube's 2016 April Fool prank and it can be watched with Snoop Dogg in 360 "SnoopaVision".
