= Prancercise =

Holistic fitness method

Prancercise is a holistic fitness method based on "a springy, rhythmic way of moving forward" created by Joanna Rohrback. It has been compared to the low-impact aerobics popularized by 1980s workout videos.

Many parodies, which have accumulated hundreds of thousands of views, were created in reaction to a Prancercise video Rohrback uploaded to YouTube.

== History ==
Screenshot from "Prancercise: A Fitness Workout"

Joanna Rohrback graduated from Florida Atlantic University with a bachelor's degree in Health Services in 1978. Around 1989 she became a "committed exercise devotee", regularly working out on the Boardwalk in Hollywood Beach, Florida. One morning, Rohrback began "nearly dancing" while power walking, which she cites as the inspiration for prancercise. Later that year, she created the first video to feature the routine entitled "Funky Punky’s Prancercise Program". She coined the term to elicit the "strength and beauty of a horse".

In 1994, Rohrback wrote a book about prancercise but couldn't find a publisher. Then, Rohrback became her mother's live-in caregiver. In 2004, after her mother died, Joanna also began to suffer from severe health complications. She was unable to Prancercise for almost nine years.

By her 60th birthday, Joanna Rohrback was able to prancercise once again. On Thanksgiving Day 2012, Rohrback successfully completed a 5k entirely in Prancercise. In December of that year she self-published her manuscript titled, "Prancercise: The Art of Physical and Spiritual Excellence". Christmas Day of the same year, she uploaded a YouTube video featuring her fitness routine. The video went viral with over 10 million views and has attracted international attention.

== In popular culture ==
Prancercise has also been the subject of negative attention, much of it mocking the regimen.

In May 2013, Joanna Rohrback demonstrated Prancercise to Al Roker and Natalie Morales on The Today Show.

In July 2013, she starred in the official music video for John Mayer's hit single Paper Doll.

In September 2013, she appeared in a promotional video for Wonderful Pistachios and e-cigarette brand Bull Smoke. She also appeared on the Comedy Central show Tosh.0 with Daniel Tosh and The Steve Harvey Show.

In December 2013, she was named the Surprise Star of the Year by the CNBC and appeared in YouTube's 2013 Rewind Mashup video, which has garnered over 15 million views in less than 48 hours.

In 2013 Joanna Rohrback and prancercise appeared on South Beach Tow where Joanna's car was repossessed and she taught prancercising to Tremont Towing dispatcher Dave Kosgrove who used it to help repossess a car.

In March 2014 Joanna Rohrback appeared in the popular TV show Glee as one of the judges at Nationals.
