= Tosh.0 =

American comedy television series

- Genre: Comedy
- Created by: Daniel Tosh; Mike Gibbons
- Directed by: Scott Zabielski
- Presented by: Daniel Tosh
- Country of origin: United States
- Original language: English
- No. of seasons: 12
- No. of episodes: 301 (list of episodes)

Production
- Executive producers: Daniel Tosh; George Lopez; Charlie Siskel; Christie Smith
- Producers: Jeff Sammon, Andrew Wantuck, Erik Tily
- Running time: 21 minutes
- Production companies: Black Heart Productions; Comedy Partners

Original release
- Network: Comedy Central
- Release: June 4, 2009 – November 24, 2020

Tosh.0 (/ˈtɒʃ ˌpɔɪnt ˈoʊ/ TOSH poynt OH) is an American comedy television series that aired on Comedy Central from June 4, 2009, to November 24, 2020. The series was hosted and produced by comedian Daniel Tosh, who provided satirical commentary on online viral video clips, internet memes, social media, trending topics, society, celebrities, stereotypes, and popular culture as a whole.

The tone was based on Tosh's deliberately offensive and controversial style of black comedy, observational comedy, satire, and sarcasm. The show at one stage reached number 1 ratings for its timeslot among men within the ages of 18–24, reaching millions of viewers at a time.

On August 20, 2020, Comedy Central announced that season 12 would be its last, reversing a four-season renewal.

== History ==
Tosh.0 was launched to a similar demographic as E!'s The Soup (and its since-canceled derivative, G4's Web Soup), and of time-filling video mashups on late-night talk shows. In December 2009, it was announced that Comedy Central had renewed the show for a full second season with 25 episodes, and the show was consistently renewed until its cancellation in 2020.

In 2015, the series was sold into syndication, to air on local stations in major US cities, and in other local markets for late-night weekend spots. Syndication ad-sales and distribution were done through syndicators Debmar-Mercury and CBS Television Distribution.

The 12th season was originally scheduled to premiere on March 17, 2020, before the COVID-19 pandemic stopped the show's tapings. On August 20, 2020, one day after the cancellation of Drunk History, Comedy Central announced that season 12 will be Tosh.0's final season. The show was previously renewed for four more seasons, but this decision was reversed as Comedy Central began transitioning away from live action original programming to adult animation. The 12th and final season premiered on September 15, 2020, and concluded on November 24, 2020.

== Overview ==
Tosh.0's low-cost production model uses viral video clips that are freely downloadable from the Internet and freely reusable via American fair use copyright laws, with host Daniel Tosh presenting from a chroma key virtual stage. Daniel Tosh says, "The [clip show] format had been tried a couple dozen times and failed. Our idea [was] to push it as far as we can and see what happens"; and that the staff selects videos of "people whose lives were changed because of a 15-second clip". Executive Producer Charlie Siskel said the show "[looks] at pop culture and all areas of life through the lens of the Internet".

The video clips are primarily selected by the show's full-time researchers and validated "on a case-by-case basis" by Comedy Central's standards and practices division. Though reportedly approving 95% of all the show's submitted videos, Tosh says this division is surprisingly unpredictable in both its approvals and disapprovals, and that he is as surprised as the audience is at what the company allows on TV. The range of selected clips includes spontaneous cuteness, whimsical performances, romance, accidents, exhibitionism, fetishism, surrealism, stunts, vomit, gore, and other acute bodily harm. Hank Stuever of The Washington Post says the show's decadent tone is formed around the values and maturity of its young adult target audience.

=== Format ===
Each episode begins with a cold open of a viral video clip from the Internet. Presenting to a live studio audience seated before his virtual stage, Daniel Tosh makes jokes and commentary about that video, and about a selection of other viral videos and pictures. He may act as if he were commenting on a video-sharing site such as YouTube, making as many jokes as possible in 20 seconds. The final video in this section enters a "Video Breakdown" segment, where Tosh discusses the video's elements of action and themes.

Tosh may perform original short sketches related to or parodying these videos. For example, he displayed a video of a man attempting to climb a precariously homemade staircase of milk crates to reach a flagpole, resulting in a great fall with visibly broken bones. Tosh whimsically parodied the tragedy in a fully animated stylistic recreation of Nintendo's original Super Mario Bros. (1985) video game, starring himself as Mario within the game's madcap action of jumping over huge blocks and collecting treasure.

The "Web Redemption" or "CeWEBrity Profile" segments additionally invite the stars of those videos directly onto Tosh.0, where they are interviewed to explain and recreate the video's subject matter. The segment yields various blends of increased cuteness, humiliation, bullying, parody, black comedy, sympathy, or protectiveness in an attempt to explore and redeem the star and the subject matter. For example, Tosh pretends to spend days trapped in an elevator with Nick White, whose actual 41 hours trapped in a New York elevator had been chronicled by The New Yorker and posted on YouTube in 2008. The "Web Reunion", "Web Remix", or "Web Investigation" segments are formatted similarly; the "Web Retreat" featured Tosh hiking with Paul Vasquez from the viral video Double Rainbow.

Throughout the show, Tosh interacts directly with the live audience, inviting broadcast viewers to actively join his following of millions of Twitter users in "live tweeting" and to submit their own videos. In the "Is it Racist?" segment, Tosh invites viewers to vote on any racial stereotypes presented in a video. In addition to garnering a reported average of 1,200 monthly death threats, Tosh's ability to call the audience to action has yielded the mass vandalism of the show's own Wikipedia article, and has resulted in traffic that temporarily crashed CelebrityNetWorth.

Tosh routinely utilizes the show's screen time for promotion of his stand-up comedy tours, merchandise, and other TV shows—prompting Forbes to describe the show as being "as much marketing [vehicle] as ... [moneymaker]".

=== Cancellation and future ===
Tosh.0 was originally renewed for four more seasons following its 12th season before Comedy Central and its parent company's announcement on August 20, 2020. ViacomCBS said in a statement that their intentions were to focus on animated and topical comedies, with Tosh.0 not fitting that format. In a press release following news of the show's cancellation, Tosh joked, "I look forward to doing an animated reboot of my show on MTV in 25 years."

== Reception ==
=== Viewership ===
The first season was a surprise hit, averaging more than one million viewers per episode. In June 2010, the season premiere was the number 1 show on its timeslot among men aged 18–24. With nearly two million viewers, the episode was the most-watched episode of the series. This record was quickly broken by the July 7 episode, which had up to 2.4 million viewers, and the July 28 episode would attract 2.7 million viewers, again winning the time slot and being the most-watched show on television that day among men aged 18–24 and 25–34. The July 28 episode was the top cable show that night for adults 18–49. Within 10 weeks of its premiere, Tosh.0 became the second-most-watched cable network show in its time slot among males aged 18–34, a sought-after advertising demographic.

In June 2015, Forbes ranked the show's Twitter following of 17 million members as number 43 out of 100 on "The Social 100", its list of the most followed celebrities on Twitter. In 2016, a New York Times study of the 50 TV shows with the most Facebook Likes found that Tosh.0 was "very much of a Northern show, but not necessarily an urban one. It is most popular in Colorado; least so in Mississippi".

=== Critical reception ===
The show's core premise has been initially compared to that of the perceived competition of E!'s Talk Soup (and its since-canceled derivative, G4's Web Soup), The Dish, Sports Soup, and of time-filling viral video mashups on late-night talk shows.

Hank Stuever of The Washington Post initially gave a mostly negative review of the June 4, 2009, debut episode of Tosh.0. He found Tosh's stage execution to yield a banal, juvenile, and unnecessary "blooper show" serving as a "cheap example of clearinghouse programming" which adds little to a mashup of viral videos but "clutter, buttressed by a lot of stale references". Stuever thought the concept of the series had potential, concluding that Tosh can "hold his own" within the concept of redeeming the Internet and "undoing the fail". Five years later, Stuever re-evaluated the show positively as a now long-time fan, and addressed his retrospective regret of his "prematurely dismissive" impression by writing a new review to serve as "a long-delayed Valentine to [his] secret dirty love, Daniel Tosh", and described Tosh.0 as "a TV show about the Internet, literally and thematically", with a hilarious use of cruelty "as black as the online soul, and as fleeting and ephemeral", yielding a "blundering exploration of race, class, gender, life".

Kenny Herzog of The A. V. Club praised the show's "high-wire act of being hysterically vicious and accurate in mocking oblivious exhibitionists without purely bullying" and that the show's "strongest moments of pure hilarity come from its extended, performed material". He describes the show as "continually playing Steal the Bacon for unexploited scraps against the absorbent blob that is viral culture".

== Series overview ==
Season	Episodes	Originally released	
Season	Episodes	First released	Last released
1	16	June 4, 2009	November 12, 2009
2	25	January 13, 2010	September 29, 2010
3	30	January 11, 2011	November 15, 2011
4	30	January 31, 2012	December 4, 2012
5	30	February 5, 2013	December 10, 2013
6	30	February 18, 2014	December 2, 2014
7	30	February 17, 2015	December 1, 2015
8	30	February 9, 2016	November 29, 2016
9	30	February 7, 2017	November 21, 2017
10	20	March 27, 2018	November 20, 2018
11	20	March 19, 2019	November 19, 2019
12	10	September 15, 2020	November 24, 2020

== Home media ==
DVD name	Ep #	Release date	Special Features	Notes
Vol. 1: Hoodies	10	June 12, 2012	11 Extended Clips.	Includes the first 10 episodes of season 1 on 2 discs.
Vol. 2: Deep V's	16	December 21, 2012	Extended Redemption Interviews; "If Daniel Fought Celebrities"-Extended; The Uncut 24-minute Human Centipede Spoiler.	Includes the last 16 episodes of season 2 on 3 discs.
Vol. 3: Cardigans Plus Casual Jackets	15	June 11, 2013	15 Extended Clips, The Uncut Orphan Spoiler, Interviews with Crew Members.	Includes the last 6 episodes of season 1 and the first 9 episodes of season 2 on 3 discs.
Vol. 4: Collas & Exposed Arms	21	June 17, 2014	Extended Redemption Interviews, and "Tiptoes" spoiler Uncut	Includes the first 21 episodes of season 3.

On June 12, 2012, Paramount Home Entertainment (under the Comedy Central Home Entertainment label) released Tosh.0: Hoodies on DVD and Blu-ray containing the first 10 episodes of Tosh.0 season one. Another DVD and Blu-ray release entitled Tosh.0: Deep V's was released on December 21, 2012. Additionally, the entire series is available for download via the iTunes Store with new episodes available after each air date. As of November 2021, the first ten seasons are partially (259 of 271 episodes) available to stream on Paramount+.
