= List of zombie short films and undead-related projects =

The following is a list of zombie short films and other zombie- and undead-related projects, such as television series.

Zombies are creatures usually portrayed as either reanimated corpses or mindless human beings, in both cases cannibalistic or more widely as undead bodies, ghouls, mummies, reanimated corpses, vampires and so on. While zombie films generally fall into the horror genre, some cross over into other genres, such as comedy, science fiction, thriller, or romance. Distinct subgenres have evolved, such as the "zombie comedy" or the "zombie apocalypse". Zombies in this article are not distinct from other types of undead like ghouls, ghosts, mummies, or vampires.

== TV series ==
Title	Director/creator	Year	Notes	References
All of Us Are Dead	Chun Sung-il / Lee Jae-kyoo / Kim Nam-su	2022	Netflix TV series	
Black Summer	Karl Schaefer / John Hyams	2019-2021	TV series	
Community	Dan Harmon	2010	TV series, zombie only in Epidemiology season 02 episode 06	
Creepshow		2019-present	TV series, zombie only in s01e05 and s02e05	
Day of the Dead	Jed Elinoff / Scott Thomas	2021	TV series	
Dead Set	Charlie Brooker / Yann Demange	2008	TV series	
Death Valley		2011	TV series	
Fear the Walking Dead		2015–2023	TV series	
Fight of the Living Dead	Tony Valenzuela	2015	web-series	
Highschool of the Dead	Tetsurō Araki	2010	TV series	
In the Flesh	Dominic Mitchell	2013-2014	TV series	
Is This a Zombie?	Takaomi Kanasaki	2011	TV series	
iZombie	Rob Thomas / Diane Ruggiero-Wright	2015–2019	TV series	
Kingdom	Kim Seong-hun	2019-present	Netflix TV series	
Love, Death & Robots	Robert Bisi / Andy Lyon	2019-present	Netflix TV series, zombie only in s03e04	
Love You as the World Ends	Sugawara Shintaro	2021-2024	TV series	
Monsters	Richard P. Rubinstein	1988-1991	TV series, zombie in s03e05	
Pushing Daisies	Bryan Fuller	2007-2009	TV series	
Sankarea	Shinichi Omata	2012	TV series	
The Santa Clarita Diet	Victor Fresco	2017-2019	Netflix TV series	
The Last of Us (TV series)	Craig Mazin and Neil Druckmann	2023-	United States. HBO Original series	
The Walking Dead	Frank Darabont	2010–2022	TV series	
The Walking Dead in the Hood	Alex Gonzalez	2016	web-series	
The Walking Dead: World Beyond	Scott M. Gimple / Matthew Negrete	2020–2021	TV series	
What If...?	Bryan Andrews	2021–present	Disney+ TV series, animated	
Woke Up Dead	Jon Heder	2009	web-series	
Xombie (a.k.a. Xombie: Dead on Arrival)	James Farr	2003	flash cartoons-series	
Z Nation	Karl Schaefer / Craig Engler	2014–2018	TV series	
Zombie Hunters: City of the Dead		2007-2014	TV series	
Zombie Roadkill	David Green	2010	shorts TV series, broadcast on Fearnet	
Zomboat!	William Hartley / Adam Miller	2019	TV series	

== Miscellaneous ==
This list considers "quasi-zombie" films and films where zombies exist in the title only. The films in this category satisfy the following requirements:

- zombies or zombie-like undead do not exist in the storyline but are mentioned in the title;
- the film has been released (otherwise the titles may be found at List of zombie short films and undead-related projects#Abandoned, in progress, and rumored projects).

Title	Director	Year	Type	Notes	References
100,000 Zombie Heads	Jose Figueora	2012	film	Postapocalyptic film with zombie in finale.	
A Zombie Movie	Glenn Payne	2009	film	Movie crew try to film zombie-comedy.	
The Aftermath (Zombie Aftermath)	Steve Barkett	1982	film	Zombie exist in alternate titles only. Mutants look like zombies.	
Cadaverella	Timothy Friend	2007	film	No zombie in this film. Cinder is a revenant.	
The Crazies	George A. Romero	1973	film	Infected humans.	
The Crazies	Breck Eisner	2010	film	Infected humans.	
Dead Roses	Johnathan Tucker	2005	film	Zombie for revenge	
Electric Zombies	John Specht	2006	film	No zombies. Brainwashing.	
Germ Z	J.T. Boone	2013	film	Humans infected by alien bacteria who consume other humans.	
Ghosts of Mars	John Carpenter	2001	film	Alien spirits possess humans and make them attack like zombies.	
It's My Party and I'll Die If I Want To	Tony Wash	2007	film	No zombies in this film. Ghosts look like zombies.	
Legion of the Dead	Paul Bales	2005	film	Mummies.	
Mausoleum	Michael Dugan	1983	film	No zombies. Demon possession of existing girl.	
Mimesis: Night of the Living Dead	Douglas Schulze	2011	film	Murderers act like zombies.	
Nightmare Circus (Barn of the Naked Dead)	Alan Rudolph	1974	film	No zombies. Mutated human imprisons women.	
Plague Town	David Gregory	2008	film	No zombies. Crazy people.	
Porno Holocaust (Orgasmo nero II – Insel der Zombies)	Joe D'Amato	1981	featured movie	Zombie exist in alternate titles only. Mutant looks like a zombie.	
Rabid	David Cronenberg	1977	film	Infected humans.	
Rise of the Dead	William Wedig	2007	film	No zombies in this movie, even though the tagline says "a terrifying zombie thriller", spirit possession causes people to act like zombies.	
Sella Turcica	Fred Vogel	2010	feature film	No zombie in this film. The main character is sick man infected by parasitic worm. He looks like a zombie at very end of movie.	
The Signal	David Bruckner, Dan Bush & Jacob Gentry	2007	anthology film	No zombies. Signal causes people to go crazy and act like zombies.	
They Must Eat	Tommy Brunswick	2006	film	Ghouls, not zombies.	
Unhuman	Marcus Dunstan	2022	film	Drugged people act like zombie.	
Zombie and the Ghost Train (Zombie ja Kummitusjuna)	Mika Kaurismäki	1991	feature film	No zombie in this film. The character's name is Zombie, but he is not a zombie.	
Zombie Hamlet	John Murlowski	2012	film	Filmmakers try make a zombie movie.	
Zombie Island Massacre	John N. Carter	1984	film	No zombies. Characters are killed by voodoo practitioners with regular slasher methods.	
Zombie: Regulators	Holger Breiner	1998	commercial	Commercial of Zombie: The Resurrection which is shown on ProSieben.	
Zombie Snake (Kaidan Hebi Onna, Snake Woman)	Atsushi Shimizu	2000	film	Undead snake woman creature, called a ghoul or ghost, but not a zombie except by title of movie.	
Zombie Vampire (Robo Vampire)	Godfrey Ho	1988	film	No zombies. Has vampires and a cyborg ninja.	
The Zombie Walks (Im Banne des Unheimlichen)	Alfred Vohrer	1968	film	No zombies. The murderer calls himself The Laughing Corpse and is revealed to be a man who dresses in a skeleton outfit.	
Zombies of the Stratosphere	Fred C. Brannon	1952	serial / film	No zombies. Characters are Martians.	
Zombiethon	Ken Dixon	1986	film	Most scenes are compilation from other zombie and gore films.	

== Abandoned, in progress, and rumored projects ==
This list considers an announced zombie-ish films. The films in this category satisfy the following requirement:

- announced as zombie or zombie-ish undead film.

Title	Director	Date of initial communication	Status	Filmmaking stage	Note
The 4th Reich	Shaun Robert Smith	2009.08.20	abandoned	announced	News (2012). IMDb
A.D.	Ben Hibon	2010.01.29	abandoned	planned	Trailer (January 2010).
The Bloodfest Club	Oscar Madrid	2009.08.26	not yet released	announced as film, announced as short film	Trailer (2011). News (2012).
Breathers: A Zombie's Lament		2009.02.23	abandoned	planned	No news after early ones. IMDb
Condition Dead	Patrick Lussier	2011.02.23	in development	announced	IMDb
The Corporate Zombie Killers	Danny Leiner	2008.11.08	abandoned	planned	No news after early ones.
Day of the Dead 3: Epidemic	Ana Clavell & James Glenn Dudelson	2009.08.26	abandoned	planned	No news after early ones.
Dead by Dawn		2009.XX.XX	abandoned	planned	No news after early ones. IMDb
Dead Dogs (original: Perros Muertos)	Koldo Serra	2010.02.12	abandoned	planned	Trailer (April 2011).
Deadtention (a.k.a. Dead Detention)	Chris Cartusciello	2011.07.10	abandoned	planned	Trailer (September 2011).
The Drought	Lawrence Gough	2009.11.09	abandoned	planned	No news after early ones. IMDb
Erdora, Chapter 1: The Death District (original: Erdora – Kapitel 1: Der Todeskreis)	Philip Polcar	2009.01.08	abandoned	planned	Trailer (June 2009).
Fragile	Eduardo Rodríguez	2007.10.04	abandoned	planned	No news after early ones.
The Harvard Zombie Massacre	Warren Zide	2008.06.28	in development	pre-production	IMDb
Haunting Kira	Teresa Fahs	2009.07.14	abandoned	planned	Teaser/Trailer (October 2009).
Hell on Earth	Ted A. Bohus	2005.04.05	abandoned	post-production	No news after early ones.
Home Delivery	Ryuhei Kitamura	2009.09.10	abandoned	planned	No news after early ones. IMDb
House of Re-Animator	Stuart Gordon	2001.XX.XX	abandoned	planned	Latest news (March 2008).
I Spit on Your Rave	Chris Boyle	2009.05.01	abandoned	filming	Latest news (October 2012).
Invasion of the Not Quite Dead (initial: Attack of the Not Quite Dead)	Antony D. Lane	2006.10.12; 2006.11.XX; 2007.01.XX; 2007.06.XX	in development	filming — 2009; – 2010; – 2011; – 2012.	Teaser (2011). New announce (2012). News (2013). IMDb
Joshua Breed (initial: Zombie Island)	Phil Claydon	2007.11.19 (as Zombie Island); 2008.08.05 (as Joshua Breed)	abandoned	announced	No news after early ones.
Living Dead Girl	Éric Tessier	2006.08.25	abandoned	planned	No news after early ones.
Night of the Living Dorks	Michael Showalter	2007.03.18	abandoned	planned	No news after early ones. Was attempted remake of Die Nacht der lebenden Loser.
Plaga Zombie: American Invasion	Garry Mederios	2013.04.08	in development	filming	Fourth entry in the Plaga Zombie series.
Plan 9	John Johnson	2010.02.12	not yet released	private screening	IMDb
School of the Dead	Seth Slick	2011.07.15	not yet released	completed	Latest news (2011). IMDb
Three Strikes, You're Dead	Corbin Bernsen	2009.10.27	abandoned	planned	Latest news (March 2010).
The Uglies 3D (initial: The Legend of Zombie Road)	Howard Smith and Ethan Terra	June 2009	abandoned	pre-production	No news after renaming on 2010-04-20
Victim of the Living Dead	Anthony Porrey	2011.10.31	abandoned	planned	No news after early ones.
Virulents	John Moore	August 2008	abandoned	in production	no news since 2010
Xombie		2009.09.23	abandoned	planned	No news after early ones. IMDb
Xombie: Reanimated		2009.09.23	abandoned	planned	No news after early ones. IMDb
Zero Dark Thirty	Eli Roth (from 2003); John Stalberg (from 2006); Paul Solet(from 2010)	2003.08.01	abandoned	planned	Followed by rumors only.
Zombie Attack from Outer Space	Jean-Anne Hawse	2010.03.29	abandoned	planned	Latest news (June 2010).
Zombie Outbreak	Sarah N. Stennett	2006	unknown	completed	no date available
Zombies of the Night	Stuart Brennan	December 2007	abandoned	post-production	remains unreleased according to Brennan

== Short films and anthology segments ==
Title	Director	Year	Notes	References
2 Hours	Michael Ballif	2012		
28 Weeks Later: Jealous Rage	Phil Stoole, Damien Sung	2007		
The ABCs of Death, segment "W is for WTF?"	Jon Schnepp	2012		
ABCs of Death 2, segment "O is for Ochlocracy (Mob Rule)"	Hajime Ohata	2014	zombie	
Aces & Eights	Matt Allen	2008	zombie	
Afternoon of the Rat-Faced Zombies (aka 28 Beers Later)	Vinson Pike	2012	zombie	
Alice Jacobs Is Dead	Alex Horwitz	2009	zombie	
All of the Dead	Tony Mines & Tim Drage	2000	Lego-zombie	
Ash vs. Lovo and the DC Dead	Brian K. Rosenthal	2016	continuation of Marvel Zombies vs. Army of Darkness	
Best Friends	Ruwan Heggelman	2016	Short zombie comedy	
Boot Hill Blind Dead	Chris Mackey & Alana Smithe	2003	zombie	
Bubba's Chili Parlor	Joey Evans	2005	zombie	
The Dead Have Risen	Mitch Csanadi	2006	zombie	
Deadtona	Scott Mena	2015		
Dead Things, segment "The Wish"	D.T. Carney	2005	short story in anthology film	
Dinner Party of the Damned	Brian Wimer	2008	zombie	
Dong of the Dead	Joanna Angel	2009	Pornographic spoof of zombie-based films	
Drag	Mark Pavia	1993		
Gay By Dawn	Jonathan London	2004	zombie	
Goregoyles: First Cut, segment "Berserkers"	Kevin J. Lindenmuth	2003	second short film in direct-to-video Goregoyles volume 1 series	
Heavy Metal, segment "B-17"	Gerald Potterton	1981	short story within anthology feature film	
Hood of Horror (Gang of Horror, Snoop Dogg's Hood of Horror)	Stacy Title	2006	third short story within anthology feature film	
I Love Sarah Jane	Spencer Susser	2008	short film	
Fist of Jesus	David Muñoz, Adrián Cardona	2012	Spanish short film	
The Living Dead Chronicles	Webby	2008		
I'll See You in My Dreams	Miguel Ángel Vivas	2003	short film	
Linnea Quigley's Horror Workout	Kenneth J. Hall	1990		
Living Dead Girl	Jon Springer	2003	zombie	
Living Dead Lock Up 3: Siege of the Dead	Mario Xavier	2008	continuation of Living Dead Lock Up 2	
The Lost Tape: Andy's Terrifying Last Days Revealed	Zack Snyder	2004	Mockumentary short and addition to Dawn of the Dead (2004)	
M is for Macho	José Pedro Lopes	2013	zombie	
Marvel Zombies vs. Army of Darkness	Brian K. Rosenthal	2013	zombie	
Maybe....	Christopher Kahler	2008	zombie	
Misery Bear - Dawn of the Ted	--	2010	Teddy bear animation zombie short film	
Mulva: Zombie Ass Kicker!	Chris Seaver	2001		
Night of the Living Bread	Kevin S. O'Brien	1990	Comedic parody of Night of the Living Dead (1968)	
Night of the Living Carrots	Robert Porter	2011	Comedic parody of Night of the Living Dead (1968)	
Night of the Living Jews	Oliver Noble	2008	Comedic parody of Night of the Living Dead (1968)	
Night of the Not So Living Dead Guy	Michael Kesler	2002	Comedic parody of Night of the Living Dead (1968)	
The Night Shift	Thomas Smith	2009	"Trigger" is a name of a female demon-zombie. Featured movie based on this short is The Night Shift (2011).	
Night Shift	Rob Chinery, Scott Chinery & Tommy Chinery	2010	zombie	
Nightmare Alley, segment "A Fistful of Innards"	Laurence Holloway & Scarlet Fry	2010	first short story in anthology film	
Paris by Night of the Living Dead	Grégory Morin	2009	zombie	
Re-Penetrator	Doug Sakmann	2004	A pornographic spoof of Re-Animator. In 2006, the film was edited and added to the anthology LovecraCked! The Movie.	
Rising Up: The Story of the Zombie Rights Movement	Laura Moss	2009	BIFF 2009 Award Winner — Laura Moss (Indie Soul Best Director Award)	
Scary or Die, segments "The Crossing", "Clowned"	Michael Emanuel	2012	anthology film with segment on zombies, infected clowns	
School of the Dead	Sam Horsley	2010	zombie	
School of the Dead (a.k.a. Liam Hooper's School of the Dead)	Liam Hooper	2012	zombie	
Slices of Life, segment "W.O.R.M."	Anthony G. Sumner	2010	first segment of anthology film, software hack turns people into "corporate zombies", although they do not really die first	
Song of the Dead	Chip Gubera	2004	Featured movie based on this short is Song of the Dead (2005).	
Special Report: Zombie Invasion	Scott Devine, Constantine Nasr	2004	short	
Still	Carl Timms	2016	A living statue entertainer is caught up in the middle of a zombie outbreak. Surrounded on all sides with only his ability to stay very still to save him, he must work out a way to survive.	
Stitched	Garth Ennis	2011	Necromanced "war zombies"	
Street of the Dead	Joe Pontillo	2008	zombie	
They Shall Pay with Rivers of Blood	Buck Anderson	2009	zombie	
Undead Ted	Daniel Knight	2007	7-minute short film	
V/H/S, segment "Tape 56"	Adam Wingard	2012	short story within anthology feature film	
V/H/S/2, segment "A Ride in the Park"	Eduardo Sánchez and Gregg Hale	2013	short story within anthology feature film	
The Walken Dead	Ryan Hunter	2011	Parody spoofs The Walking Dead TV series combining its theme with actor Christopher Walken movie quotes	
Winter of the Dead	Markus Heiskanen	2005	Finnish short film	
Worst Case Scenario (Woensdag Gehaktdag)	Richard Raaphorst	2004	DVD released in 2008	
The Zombeatles: All You Need Is Brains	Doug Gordon	2009	Timeline: autumn 2008 – shot; 23 January 2009 – premiere; 1 April 2009 – DVD on demand.	
Zombie Movie	Michael J. Asquith, Ben Stenbeck	2005	zombie	
Zombie Hunter	Geoff Hamby	2005	zombie	
Zombie in a Penguin Suit	Chris Russell	2011	follows the path of an aquarium worker-turned zombie	
Zombie Run	Damian Morter	2013		
Zombie Valley	Darin Beckstead	2003	zombie	
Zombie Vegetarians	Mad Martian	2004	zombie	
Zombie Warrior	Daniel Flügger	2007	zombie	
Zombieworld	(multiple) (Note: Jesse Baget, Adrián Cardona, Rafa Dengrá, Luke Guidici, Phil Haine, Cameron McCulloch, David Muñoz, Adam O'Brien, Zachary Ramelan, Paul Shrimpton, Vedran Marjanovic Wesker, Tommy Woodard)	2014	anthology of shorts	
Zomblies	David M. Reynolds	2010	zombie	

== See also ==
- List of apocalyptic and post-apocalyptic fiction
- List of zombie video games
- List of zombie films
- List of zombie novels
- Zombie (fictional)
- List of vampire films
