= Brian Sings and Swings =

- Family Guy episode
- Episode no.: Season 4 Episode 19
- Directed by: Chuck Klein; Zac Moncrief
- Written by: Michael Rowe
- Production code: 4ACX21
- Original air date: January 8, 2006

Guest appearances
- Mark Borchardt; James Burkholder; Don LaFontaine; Mike Schank; Stacey Scowley; Frank Sinatra Jr. as himself; Nicole Sullivan; Fred Tatasciore as John Goodman; Audrey Wasilewski

Episode chronology
← Previous "The Father, the Son, and the Holy Fonz"	Next → "Patriot Games"
- Family Guy season 4

"Brian Sings and Swings" is the 19th episode of the fourth season and the 69th episode of Family Guy. The episode was first broadcast on Fox on January 8, 2006. Brian meets Frank Sinatra Jr. and begins to perform on stage with him, and they are shortly joined by Stewie. Meanwhile, Meg pretends to be a lesbian after being offered a chance to join the Lesbian Alliance Club at her school.

The episode was written by Michael Rowe and directed by Chuck Klein and Zac Moncrief. It received mostly positive reviews from critics for its storyline and many cultural references. The episode featured guest performances by Mark Borchardt, James Burkholder, Don LaFontaine, Mike Schank, Stacey Scowley, Frank Sinatra Jr., Nicole Sullivan, Fred Tatasciore, Audrey Wasilewski, along with several recurring guest voice actors for the series.

== Plot ==
As Peter is leaving for work, he hits Brian with his car backing up, sending him to the hospital. Meanwhile, Meg makes friends with a girl named Sarah at her school, unaware that she is about to be offered a place in the Lesbian Alliance Club. After speaking with Neil Goldman, she realizes that she is now considered a lesbian by the group and prepares to drop out; however, when she realizes she is much more popular as a lesbian, she pretends to be one. When Meg tells the family that she is now a lesbian, she is mocked by Lois, who knows she is not.

Meanwhile, Brian becomes depressed after the accident, but after speaking with Frank Sinatra Jr., he begins to perform with him, changing his outlook on life to that of positivity. After being told of Brian's new lifestyle, the family is impressed and encourage him to continue. However, when he is invited by Sinatra to perform with him again, their duo is interrupted by Stewie, who joins the performance. The three form "The new Rat Pack."

In a drunken condition following a performance, Brian loses Stewie, who finally returns home with his ear having been bit off by a deer. Peter demands that Brian stops performing with Sinatra immediately and threatens to telephone Sinatra's "mother," Mia Farrow. Angry at Peter's bossiness, Brian bites his arm, which makes Peter afraid of him. The next day, Brian tries to reconcile with Peter, but Peter, still scared, only throws things at him and hides.

Brian, regretful at biting Peter, quits performing with Stewie and Sinatra, resorting to drinking wine from a gutter. Stewie finds him and boosts his morale with a pep talk. Meanwhile, Meg goes to Sarah's home to confess that she is not a lesbian and that she only pretended to be one in order to make friends, while Sarah had mistakenly believed Meg had come over to have sex.

The episode ends with Stewie, Brian and Frank Sinatra Jr. singing once more at a club until Mia Farrow (called in by Peter) intervenes, reprimanding Frank for "hanging out 'till all hours with a baby and a dog", and spanks him in front of the audience, much to his chagrin.

== Production ==
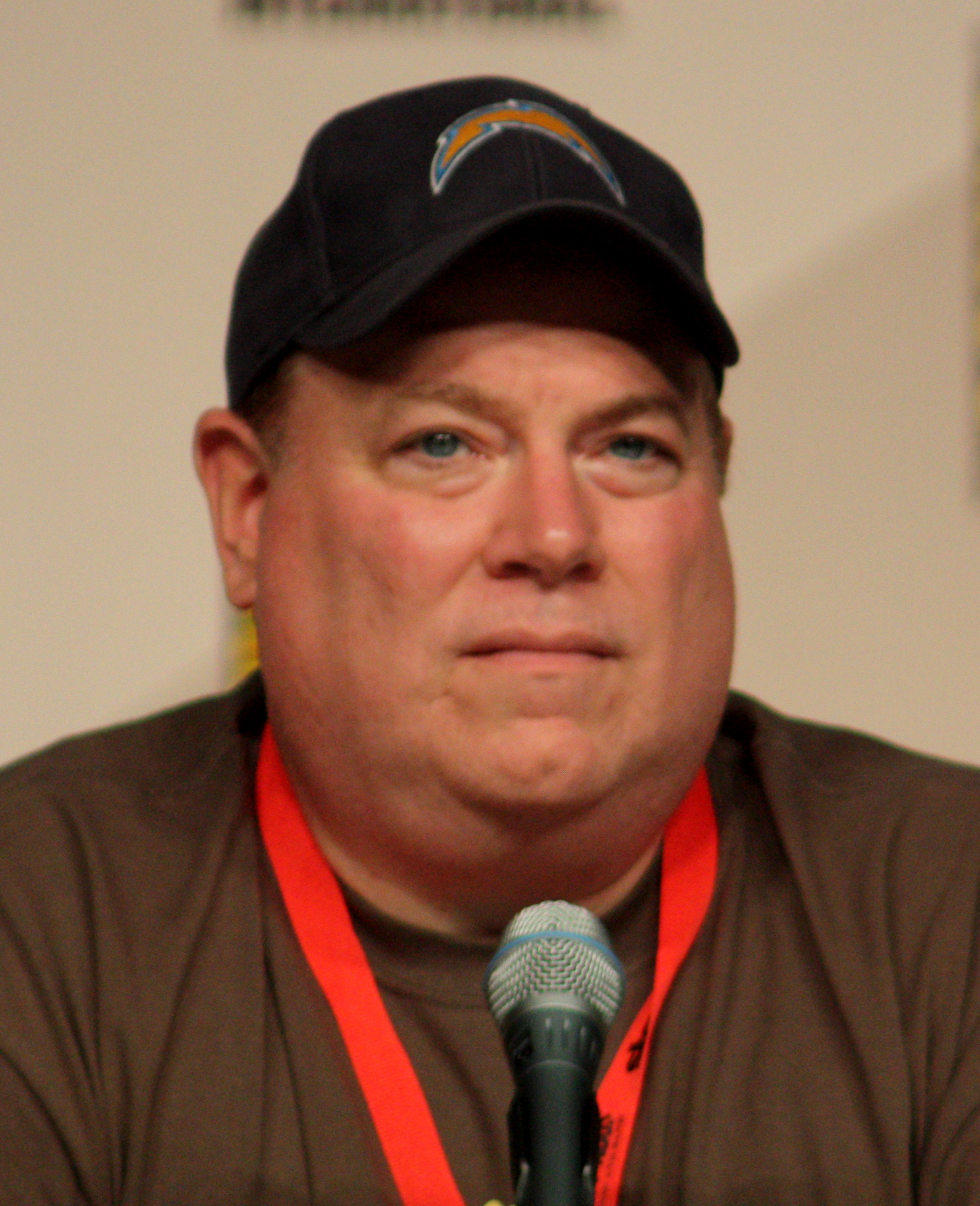
Michael Rowe wrote the episode.

Scripts and other production materials were altered and modified extensively. The rhythm and pacing of the show required frequent rewrites due to the inclusion of musical performances. MacFarlane comments that "having Frank Sinatra, Jr. on board was a pleasure to the team." The scene where Meg sees Chris in the bathroom parodies the scene from The Empire Strikes Back where Darth Vader has his helmet placed on his head. The producers acknowledged that John Williams had forbidden re-recordings of his music so the actual recording of "The Imperial March" was used with permission by Williams and Lucasfilm.

The synopsis for this episode partially focuses on Meg becoming a lesbian; this was because Seth MacFarlane believed the United States loved lesbians, which he describes as "the best kind of love". As Brian and Stewie move back and forth on the stage when performing with Frank Sinatra Jr., the scene originally appeared wrong, as the characters did not match the movement of the background. Brian makes a comment about Stewie's weird laugh when he finds something really funny. This is the only time on Family Guy when MacFarlane has not voiced Stewie; instead, the laughing was performed by Ricky Blitt, a former writer of Family Guy.

== Cultural references ==
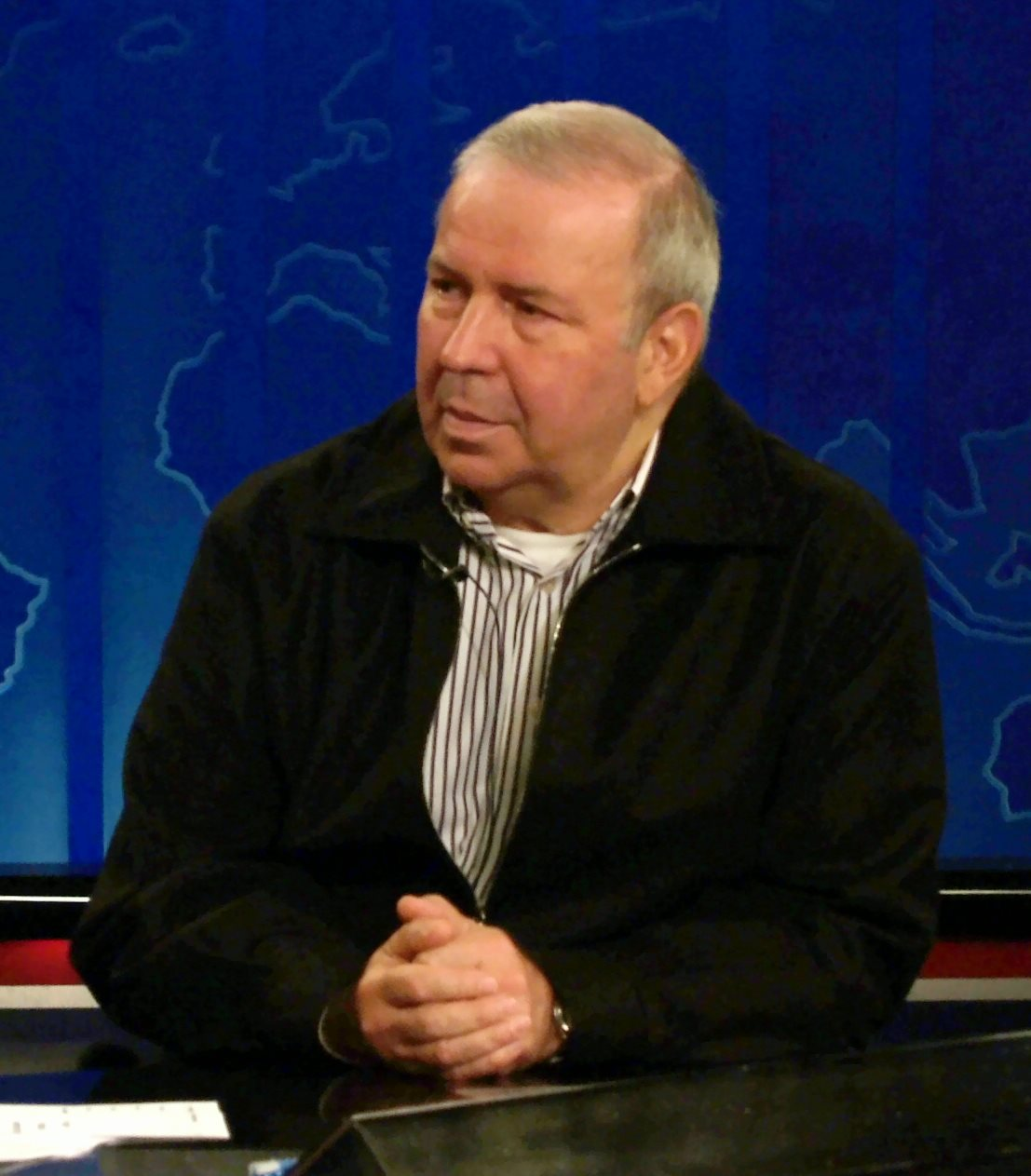
Frank Sinatra Jr. was the main guest star.

As Brian and Sinatra Jr. are performing on stage, the song they are singing was originally composed for the 1960 film High Time; however, after the film, the song became so popular that it was used in a new movie in 1973. Another musical performance performed by Brian and Sinatra was based on a musical composition used in the film Scared Stiff. When Brian is in the hospital after being hit by Peter's car, Stewie says that he will have to hang out with The Rock again. The cutaway shows a trailer with Stewie and the Rock; its narrator (Don LaFontaine) speculates about the Rock's race and then that of actress Jessica Alba.

When Meg says that she is a super mega-lesbian, Sarah tells her that she will fit in with the other super-mega-lesbians, who sing "Elvira" by the Oak Ridge Boys, much to Meg's excitement. In a cutaway mentioned by Stewie, Thomas Edison hoards electricity, as he fights with Alexander Graham Bell. Edison talks about how much more fortunate he is than Bell, since he has hoarded electricity. He says that he watches The Office, and plays "Foxy Lady" by Jimi Hendrix. When Brian says "you gotta live life and live it hard", Stewie responds by calling it "the Chris Farley method", a reference to the late comedian. The scene where Meg is talking to a friend about kissing is interrupted by Quagmire coming out of the closet with electric equipment, commenting that is "just awful". Than a filmmaker he refers to as Mark and his friend, who Mark refers to as Mike, comes out of the closet which he asks their opinion on it. After Mark says he does not know, he asks Mike his opinion, where he proceeds to mumble. This is a reference to the cult 1999 documentary American Movie.

== Reception ==
Family Guy and this episode are highly regarded in the music community of Los Angeles, due to the show featuring many music-inspired scenes and for the use of its own orchestra. Ryan J. Budke of TV Squad gave the episode a positive review, writing that it was not the show's "greatest episode this year, but it was still funny".
