= Living Dead Girl =

Living Dead Girl may refer to:

- "Living Dead Girl" (song), a 1999 song by Rob Zombie
- Living Dead Girl (novel), a 2008 novel by Elizabeth Scott
- Living Dead Girl (film), a 2005 American short horror film
- The Living Dead Girl or La Morte Vivante, a 1982 French horror film
- "Living Dead Girl" (Dawson's Creek), a 2002 television episode
