= Abby Singer (film) =

- DVD cover
- Directed by: Ryan Williams
- Written by: Ryan Williams; Clint J. Palmer
- Produced by: Clint J. Palmer; Jonathan M. Black; Ryan Williams
- Starring: Clint J. Palmer; Ryan Williams; Wendy Buss; Pat Donahue; Robin Ballard; Mark Wunder; Jay O. Sanders
- Cinematography: Ryan Williams
- Edited by: Ryan Williams; Clint J. Palmer
- Music by: Jeffrey Gold
- Distributed by: Universal Studios Home Entertainment
- Release date: October 28, 2003
- Running time: 79 minutes
- Country: United States
- Language: English
- Budget: $1,500 (estimated)

Abby Singer is a 2003 American dark comedy film that chronicles the life of Curtis Clemins, who is torn between the love of his life and accomplishing his dream. It had some film festival screenings in 2003 and again in 2006 (in a revised edition). The film also has several celebrity cameo appearances, including Brad Pitt, Roger Ebert, and Jake Gyllenhaal.

The film was named after the second-to-last shot of the day on a film, which is called an Abby Singer after Abner E. "Abby" Singer.

== Plot ==
The film follows Curtis Clemins (Clint Palmer) and Kevin Prouse (Ryan Williams) as they have to deal with life's ups and downs.

Kevin Prouse walks across campus to teach his acting class. Curtis Clemins stares self loathingly at himself in the mirror. Maxine Helms (Robin Ballard) and her daughter drive to an audition. Curtis prays in church, and then goes to the casting office where he works. Kevin lectures his acting class on the importance of not giving up on your dreams. All the while, Mr. Mooker (Pat Donahue), tells his son to manage their construction site, so he can go to an audition. Curtis arrives at the audition; he brings in the first actor, who fails miserably. Maxine sends Curtis to get copies and on his way out, Curtis runs into Mr. Mooker telling him that there is no part for him to audition for. Mr. Mooker slips past Curtis with the excuse that he has to use the bathroom, then petitions Maxine for a part, Maxine agrees to let him audition.

Curtis gets copies at his old college campus, while there he takes a detour to the theater department and reminisces about his time there 10 years before. Curtis and Kevin were friends, but they have a falling out when Kevin decides to dump their friendship over a girl, Leanne. Kevin marries Leanne and gives up his dream of being an actor, instead decides to teach. Curtis asks Kevin if he is still dreaming, Kevin replies "every now and then when I fall asleep".

Curtis is accosted by a young female college student who overzealously petitions him for an audition. Curtis awkwardly escapes down a flight of stairs. During this time, Kevin visits his father (Jay O. Sanders), a ski lift attendant, in an attempt to gain some advice about his impending divorce from Leanne.

Mr. Mooker and his son Jake (Mark Wunder), discuss Mr. Mooker's dream of becoming an actor as they fish. Jake does not approve of his father's choice to neglect their business to chase an unattainable dream.

Curtis attacks a parking attendant, and is arrested. Curtis is forced to attend psychiatric sessions with state psychiatrist Dr. Phelps. Dr Phelps asks Curtis when the last time he felt happy. Curtis relates to Dr. Phelps (Scott Hanks) his experiences at the Sundance Film Festival with his ex-girl friend Mabline (Wendy Buss).

Curtis, Mabline and Maxine, attempt to fit in at the Festival, getting advice and petitioning Jodie Foster, Mark Borchardt, Mike Schank, and Roger Ebert, Curtis becomes jealous of Mabline as she flirts and dances with movie executives, higher up on the food chain than him. Curtis tries to retaliate by using his status as a casting director to find women to make her jealous only to realize that he is sexually powerless because of his religious convictions.

Curtis goes to Adam Carolla for advice, and Corolla tells him that maybe he should get a prostitute.

Curtis, Mabline and Maxine attend the Sundance Film Festival awards ceremony. John Waters announces to the audience that every one is at the festival for a reason. Curtis Maxine and Mabline, attempt to make connections with Stockard Channing, Robin Tunney, and Patricia Arquette.

Dr. Phelps continues his session with Curtis, who tells him about his break-up with Mabline at the Independent Spirit Awards. Curtis and Mabline fight backstage at the ceremonie, all the while, Jake Gyllenhaal reluctantly is pulled into the argument. Don Cheadle attempts to avoid the fray as well. Jill Hennessy tells Mabline to move on; Finally Brad Pitt tells Curtis that he is done.

Curtis tells Dr. Phelps that he feels better having shared his story and they agree to meet next week.

Kevin tries desperately to believe in his students. He scans the class looking for someone to inspire him.

Curtis hires a prostitute but, while having sex, has a nervous breakdown.

Kevin meets with Leanne at their former house, and signs divorce papers, ruining his hopes for a better future.

Curtis takes his last thousand dollars and buys a gun, telling the dealers he intends to kill himself as an artistic statement. While, Kevin returns to his empty house and starts to drink. Curtis wanders the streets of Salt Lake City, alone.

Curtis calls Kevin as his last act, saying goodbye. As Maxine holds callbacks for the audition, Mr. Mooker stands up to his son, Jake, and goes to the callback.

Curtis rides the L-train, out of town. Kevin boards the train, and confronts Curtis who runs. Curtis goes to the woods to kill himself. Kevin then appears at the last moment.

== Cast ==
- Clint Palmer as Curtis Clemins
- Ryan Williams as Kevin Prouse
- Wendy Buss as Mabeline
- Pat Donahue as Mr. Mooker
- Robin Ballard as Maxine Helms
- Mark Wunder as Jake Mooker
- Jay O. Sanders as Kevin's Father
- Scott Hanks as Dr. Phelps

Cameos

- Brad Pitt
- Jennifer Aniston
- Jill Hennessy
- Don Cheadle
- Jake Gyllenhaal
- Stockard Channing
- Patricia Arquette
- Robin Tunney
- Roger Ebert
- Adam Carolla
- Dave Attell
- Lloyd Kaufman
- Mike Schank
- Mark Borchardt
- Jodie Foster

== Production history ==
Director Ryan Williams began the project in May 2001, as a series of test scenes shot in Provo, Utah. Williams had tapped a local acting class (The Actor's Gang) for his cast, and then he began the shooting along with working on several development issues with the story line with some of the actors. This would prove to be an ongoing issue for that the film for that it had no script.

In 2002 Williams, Clint Palmer and the movie's lead actors went to Sundance Film Festival to work on several scenes. While there they came up with the idea to pose as volunteers during the awards ceremony so that they could include several A-list cameos. They were able to get cameo segments from: Roger Ebert, Stockard Channing, Mike Schank, Lloyd Kaufman, Mark Borchardt Between May 2002 - December 2002: Abby Singer was still in the process of being produced. Palmer, Williams and Jonathan M Black were working aggressively on the production of the film. It was thought that they needed to move to California, which they did that December.

While in California Williams, Black, Palmer and Kamell Clauson were able to access the 2003 Golden Globes and to other various parties. It was at one of these parties where they meet the freelance writer, Tim Cooper, who was interested in "Operation Nighthawk", which took place in February 2003. The idea of Operation Nighthawk came when the filmmakers realized how they just could walk onto the Paramount lot with no problems. For the filmmakers, this became a great potential for marketing their film. After several months of reconnaissance, Black, Clauson, Williams and Palmer, along with writer Tim Cooper and a photographer, dropped off an Abby Singer press pack and a copy of the film trailer to all of the major studios and the executives of each studio.

Williams, Black, Palmer and Wendy Buss, were also able to be at the 2003 Independent Spirit Awards. Where they were able to have access to everything and everyone by using the same tactics has they had in the past, which was that they posed as volunteers. While there they filmed several more cameos. They successfully shot cameos with: Jill Hennessy, Jake Gyllenhaal, Don Cheadle, and Brad Pitt.

Abby Singer made its film festival premier at the 2003 New Orleans Media Experience. The film won the two top awards: 'Best Independent Film' and 'Best Feature Film'. Still needing more marketing and public notice, Black and Clauson made their way to Salt Lake City, UT to organize another publicity stunt, 'Operation Altitude'. Operation Altitude was a publicity campaign at the 2004 Sundance Film Festival. Over 1,500 people viewed Abby Singer in the course of the festival, through private screenings. In addition, the group put together a fake Comedy Central crew to build hype for the film and to encourage more people to see it. A documentary entitled, The Misbehavers, directed by Bryan Young and Elias Pate, was filmed to cover the whole process.

From October 2004 to 2005, the filmmakers were able to hunt down and gain access to their unsigned cameos. The celebrity releases were finally signed. Also, during this time, the film underwent a major revision and got a new soundtrack. Between 2005 and 2006, Abby Singer again was submitted to and screened at several film festivals.

- Ain't Cool News: "Ezra reports that he was also inspired by the filmmakers' independent spirit and the film's "never give up" message. Pitt, Ebert, and Gyllenhaal are reportedly major supporters of the film (Abby Singer) ...".

== Reception ==
Abby Singer won the awards, Best Feature and Best Independent Film, at the 2003 New Orleans Media Experience. Then in 2005 the film won the Independent Spirit Award at the MassBay Film Festival. In 2006 Abby Singer won Best Feature Comedy at the Eureka Springs Digital Film Festival and Most Creative Film at the Seattle True Independent Film Festival.
