= Living Dead Girl (film) =

- Mark Borchardt & Jon Springer (2003)
- Directed by: Jon Springer
- Screenplay by: Jon Springer
- Produced by: Jon Springer, Patrick Chenal III; Ted Dewberry; Ron Johnson; Michele Kurkowski
- Starring: Mark Borchardt; Nadine Gross; Mehrdad Sarlak; Charles Hubbell; Robert Elliot; Harrison Matthews; Jennifer Prettyman
- Cinematography: Jon Springer
- Edited by: Jon Springer
- Release date: July 23, 2005
- Running time: 10 minutes
- Country: United States
- Language: English

Living Dead Girl is a low-budget short horror film directed by Jon Springer. The film stars Mark Borchardt who is best known as the subject of the cult documentary American Movie (1999). "Living Dead Girl" is a silent-film zombie parody with extremely graphic gore effects.

== Plot ==
A zombie horde overtakes the Mall of America. Meanwhile, we see a man named Tom feverishly barricading the inside of his house, only to have his not-too-bright girlfriend open a window to let some fresh air in.

The ghouls enter and overtake the couple, but only after a valiant attempt by Tom to decimate the invaders with his .357 magnum. During the struggle, Tom's last bullet accidentally discharges into Barbara's femoral artery. Barbara bleeds to death in the hallway as Tom is devoured.

The next day, Barbara stumbles through downtown St. Paul as a newly activated zombie. She encounters Jesus Christ on a street corner and bites a huge bloody chunk out of his forearm. Barbara continues on, walking aimlessly through the empty city; she eventually collapses on the sidewalk. Barbara's appearance changes back to normal as she returns to life.

== Cast ==
- Mark Borchardt – Jesus
- Nadine Gross – Barbara
- Mehrdad Sarlak – Tom
- Charles Hubbell – Lead Zombie
- Robert Elliot – T-shirt Zombie
- Harrison Matthews – Redneck Zombie
- Jennifer Prettyman – Chick Zombie

== Release ==
The film premiered at the 2004 Fantasia Film Festival in Montreal, Canada.

== See also ==
- List of zombie short films and undead-related projects
