= Jon Springer =

American independent filmmaker (born 1966)

Jon Springer - August 2012

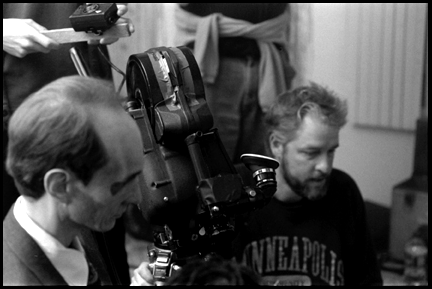
Jon Springer (behind camera) directing Living Dead Girl in 2003.

Jon Springer (born in 1966) is an American independent filmmaker whose science fiction and horror films combine explicit imagery with religious subtext.

== Biography ==
Springer produced and directed The Hagstone Demon, a feature-length horror film starring indie-film icon Mark Borchardt (subject of the 1999 documentary American Movie), and underground cinema artist Lung Leg. The Hagstone Demon premiered at the 2009 TromaDance Film Festival in Park City, Utah and screened as a double-bill with American Movie (1999) at the Boston Museum of Fine Arts.

Springer's style has been criticized as derivative of directors Stanley Kubrick and George A. Romero. Springer was called “a filmmaker who sees nothing as taboo” by Film Threat in 2002, and named “most audacious filmmaker” in his native state of Minnesota in 2002.

== Filmography ==
Year	Film	Director	Writer	Cinematography	Producer	Editor
1993	Dead Looters	Yes	Yes	Yes	No	No
2000	The Hymens Parable	Yes	Yes	Yes	Yes	Yes
2001	Heaven 17	Yes	Yes	Yes	No	No
2002	Heterosapiens	Yes	Yes	Yes	No	No
2003	Living Dead Girl	Yes	Yes	Yes	No	No
2005	The Wood Witch	Yes	Yes	Yes	Yes	Yes
2006	Space Monster	Yes	Yes	Yes	No	No
2009	Dollface	Yes	Yes	Yes	Yes	Yes
2010	Zombie 101	Yes	Yes	Yes	No	No
2011	The Hagstone Demon	Yes	Yes	Yes	Yes	Yes
