= As I Wake =

2011 novel by Elizabeth Scott

First edition (publ. Dutton Books for Young Readers)

As I Wake is a young adult novel by Elizabeth Scott about Ava; a girl who wakes up and finds herself in an unfamiliar place. She goes to the hospital and is diagnosed with amnesia and when she comes home, she is welcomed by her mother, her friends, and a crush finally showing interest.

Elizabeth Scott is an American author who has written many books including Living Dead Girl.

== Plot ==
Ava Hanson wakes up in an ambulance and can't remember anything. In the hospital, she dreams of 56-412, a boy. She is diagnosed with Amnesia and is released from the hospital. She learns that she is seventeen, a junior at Lakewood Day, and lives with her mother. Her father died when she was younger. Even though her handwriting looks the same, and she looks the same, she can't shake the feeling that she is not Ava Hanson. Ava watches the boy in her dreams, but she can't shake the feeling that it's not a dream.

== Publication ==
The book was actually written between 2007 and 2008, but was not sold until 2010. Elizabeth Scott also claims to have wanted to read this type of book when she was younger but wasn't able to. She also claims to have had an "obsession" with modal realism, 1980s East Germany, and the roles played by Stasi.

== Reviews ==
When the book first came out it received a wide range of reviews. Some loved it, while others hated it. Publishers Weekly stated that the book will have readers "on the edge of their seats." Kirkus Reviews, however, states that the book is flawed, but it will keep the reader turning pages. Booklist calls As I Wake a combination between a dystopian thriller and a romance. It was also reviewed in the Bulletin of the Center for Children's Books.

== See also ==
- Elizabeth Scott
- Living Dead Girl
