= The Hagstone Demon =

2009 film by Jon Springer

- DVD cover
- Directed by: Jon Springer
- Written by: Harrison Matthews; Jon Springer
- Produced by: Jon Springer; Harrison Matthews; Michelle Kurkowski
- Starring: Mark Borchardt; Nadine Gross; Cyndi Kurtz; Sasha Andreev; Lung Leg
- Cinematography: Jon Springer
- Edited by: Jon Springer
- Music by: Chris Cunningham
- Production companies: Cricket Films; Slap Shot Productions
- Distributed by: Pacific Entertainment Corporation
- Release dates: January 21, 2009 (TromaDance); November 27, 2009 (United States)
- Running time: 96 minutes
- Country: United States
- Language: English

The Hagstone Demon is a 2009 American supernatural horror film directed, co-written, co-produced, photographed, and edited by Jon Springer. The film stars Mark Borchardt as an alcoholic writer and caretaker plagued by demonic forces, with Nadine Gross, Cyndi Kurtz, Sasha Andreev, and Lung Leg in supporting roles. It was shot mostly in black-and-white.

== Plot ==
Burned out from his career as an investigative reporter and devastated by the suicide of his wife, Douglas Elmore decides to take a job as the temporary caretaker of a dilapidated apartment complex called "The Hagstone." His daily existence soon descends into an alcohol soaked obsession with his dead wife. Late one night, the ghost of Julie appears to him, striking palpable terror into his banal existence.

The next day, an odd tenant named Mr. Thompson accosts Douglas and demands that he remove a homeless prostitute named Karna from the basement of the Hagstone, along with her hairless cat Victoria. Douglas takes pity on Karna and tells her she can stay in a small apartment near the laundry room.

Douglas visits his priest brother-in-law Carl and informs him of Julie's spectral visitations. He returns to the Hagstone only to discover one of the tenants brutally murdered. An unfeeling Karna asks Douglas to repair something in her apartment. Douglas then decides to follow Karna in secret on one of her nightly excursions through the city, where he witnesses a disturbing encounter between Karna and a pale, sinister looking man in a deserted alley.

Back at the Hagstone again, Mr. Brennan corners Douglas and accuses Karna of foul play. That evening Douglas informs Karna of Mrs. Brennan’s suspicions, but she remains aloof and easily seduces him.

The next day, Douglas goes about his duties in a state of post-coital euphoria, until he discovers Mrs. Brennan’s bloody corpse in the rear stairwell of the building. A no-nonsense detective named Willis interrogates Douglas, making it clear that he is now the prime suspect in both murders. He also informs Douglas that he plans to dig up Julie’s grave and re-open the investigation into her death. Determined to clear his name and to protect Julie, Douglas confronts Karna and accuses her of the murders, yet succumbs to her overwhelming sexual power. Karna slips a mickey into Douglas’ drink and whisks him away to a bizarre satanic sex ritual that culminates in a human sacrifice.

Douglas wakes up in the apartment of another tenant named Barbara Halloway, who urges Douglas to leave the building for good. Douglas refuses and instead breaks down Karna’s apartment door, only to find an abandoned, empty room. Barbara drives Douglas’ to his brother-in-law, Carl. Douglas is convinced that demonic forces are attempting to use the police to dig up Julie’s body, so that her corpse can be re-inhabited by them. The three then travel to the cemetery, where they find Detective Willis murdered at the foot of Julie's grave.

Douglas, Barbara and Carl return to confront the demonic forces that inhabit the Hagstone building. Together they defeat the fully demonized versions of Karna (the succubus) and her incubus pimp, Mr. Thompson. Douglas then discovers Julie’s corpse buried in the bowels of the Hagstone sub-basement. Julie's corpse re-animates before Douglas' eyes. She overpowers him and escapes, killing Carl in the process. Douglas and Barbara then confront Karna's monstrously transformed cat Victoria in the boiler room. With the last of the demons defeated, Douglas and Barbara leave the Hagstone for the last time. Julie is seen contemplating her next victim.

== Cast ==
- Mark Borchardt as Douglas Elmore
- Nadine Gross as Karna / Mary Anne Riley
- Cyndi Kurtz as Barbara Halloway
- Sasha Andreev as Fr. Carl Becker
- Gizelle Erickson as Julie Elizabeth Elmore
- Marilyn Murray as Mrs. Brennan
- Jay Smiley as Mr. Thompson
- Lung Leg as Mrs. Riley
- Michael Glen as Detective Willis
- Charles Hubbell as John Witkowski
- Tiffany Moy as Prostitute

== Release ==
The film premiered on January 21, 2009 at the 10th Annual Tromadance Film Festival in Park City, Utah, and was released in September 2011 by Pacific Entertainment Corporation.

== Accolades ==
The film was awarded the "Best Feature" prize at the 2009 Atlanta Horror Festival and received positive reviews in various horror-related media outlets.
