= I Spit on Your Rave =

Unreleased British zombie film

- 2009 promotional poster
- Directed by: Chris Boyle
- Written by: Chris Boyle
- Starring: Noel Fielding
- Production companies: Film4; Warp Films
- Distributed by: Warp Films (trailer)
- Running time: 3 minutes
- Country: United Kingdom
- Language: English

I Spit on Your Rave was the title for a planned 2010 film production by Film4 and Warp Films, who in 2009 released a trailer to promote their mockumentary zombie comedy horror film starring Noel Fielding. It was written and directed by Chris Boyle, and recorded during the 2009 Big Chill Music Festival, at an event recorded by Guinness Book of World Records for breaking the record for "Most Amount of Zombies Captured on Camera".

== Production ==
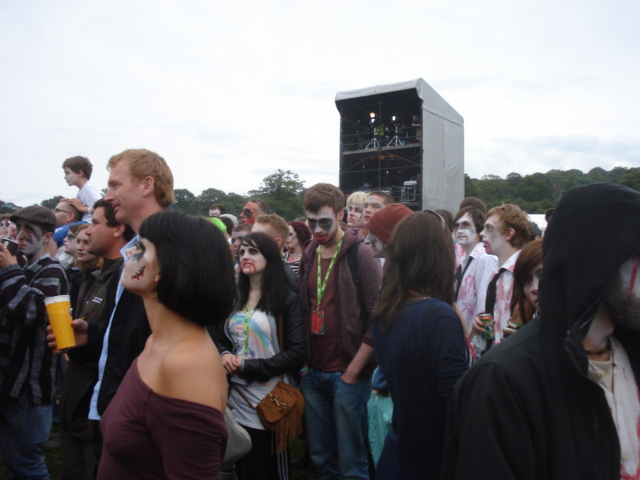
The undead mingle with the living at The Big Chill

Filmed in Herefordshire at Eastnor Castle Deer Park, I Spit on Your Rave was filmed partly in an attempt to break the world record for "Most Amount of Zombies Captured on Camera". People attending the Big Chill Festival on 6 August 2009, were encouraged to come dressed as zombies as part of the attempt. For those who wished to take part but did not arrive in costume, make-up "Zombification Stations" were set up at arena entrances. Though many more were alleged to have taken part, the record was officially broken when 4,026 people were counted as zombies for the film.

== Post-production ==
Though announced for a 2010 premiere, a completed feature film was never released, but on 30 October 2012 it was reported that the I Spit on Your Rave film was being re-developed as a six-part TV series for the E4 television channel.

== Plot ==
During the 2012 Summer Olympics in London, a virus was released which causes a zombie uprising which decimates humanity. In the year 2018, six years after civilization is destroyed and with few humans left, the King of the Zombies (Noel Fielding) organizes a music festival to keep the zombie horde entertained after the zombie apocalypse.

== Reception ==
Quiet Earth wrote: "Of all the creative ways to exploit the zombie genre, I Spit on Your Rave has got be up there with the best of them", offering that the film would not appeal to everyone and may well annoy many.

== See also ==
- I Spit on Your Grave
- Shaun of the Dead
- Return of the Living Dead: Rave to the Grave
- Zombieland
- List of zombie short films and undead-related projects
