= Elizabeth Scott (author) =

American author of young adult novels

- Born: March 15, 1972 (age 54)
- Occupation: Author
- Writing career
- Genre: Young adult

Elizabeth Scott (born March 15, 1972) is an American author of young adult novels.

== Life ==
Born in a small town, Scott grew up near Hopewell in Southern Virginia. Both of her parents were teachers, which she ended up taking classes from both of them. She majored in European Studies and met her future husband in her freshman year. Along with writing novels Elizabeth Scott has also been an editor and an office manager. She has also sold hardware and pantyhose.

== Bibliography ==
=== Novels ===
- Bloom, (2007), Simon Pulse, ISBN 978-1-4169-2683-2
- Perfect You, (2008), Simon Pulse, ISBN 978-1-4169-5355-5
- Stealing Heaven, (2008), HarperTeen, ISBN 978-0-0611-2280-4
- Living Dead Girl, (2008), Simon Pulse, ISBN 978-1-4169-6059-1
- Something, Maybe, (2009), Simon Pulse, ISBN 978-1-4169-7865-7
- Love You Hate You Miss You, (2009), Simon Pulse, ISBN 978-1-4169-7865-7
- The Unwritten Rule, (2010), Simon Pulse, ISBN 978-1-4169-7891-6
- Grace, (2010), Dutton Books, ISBN 978-0-525-42206-8
- Between Here and Forever, (2011), Simon Pulse, ISBN 978-1-4169-9484-8
- As I Wake, (2011), Dutton Books, ISBN 978-0-525-42209-9
- Miracle, (2012), Simon Pulse, ISBN 978-1-4424-1706-9
- Heartbeat, (2014), Harlequin Teen, ISBN 978-0-3732-1096-1
