= Lung Leg =

American pin-up girl and actress

Lung Leg (born Elisabeth Carr; July 8, 1963, in Minneapolis, Minnesota) is an American pin-up girl and actress perhaps best known for appearing on the cover of the Sonic Youth album EVOL. During the 1980s, she gained fame as a model and star of films made by the transgressive movement.

== Film career ==
Lung Leg appeared in several Richard Kern films, notably starring in one of his longest features, the 1985 film You Killed Me First, as well as appearing in Worm Movie (1985) and Fingered (1986). She also appeared in two music videos directed by Kern, "Concubine" (1984) by Butthole Surfers and Sonic Youth's "Death Valley '69" (1985).

After her film career in the 1980s, Lung Leg left the public sphere for several years. Nick Zedd wrote in his autobiography, Totem of the Depraved, that she relocated to Minneapolis, before moving back to New York City after a short romance with German musician Blixa Bargeld of Einstürzende Neubauten and Nick Cave and the Bad Seeds.

She resumed her film career in 2005, appearing in the Mike Etoll film Sewer Baby. In it, she played a bartender dealing with Tiny Tim, various monsters, special effects and a primordial dwarf. In 2011, Lung Leg appeared in The Hagstone Demon, a film directed by Jon Springer.

In 2010, Lung Leg appeared in the documentary Blank City featuring interviews with participants in the no wave cinema and transgressive cinema movements.

There are few known interviews with her; one appeared in issue No. 12 of Film Threat magazine (1987), and another, by Duane Davis, appeared in the book, Deathtripping: The Cinema of Transgression (1995), edited by Jack Sargent. An excerpt of a now lost video interview of her appears in IDN4 (1991).
