= Coven (1997 film) =

1997 American short horror film

- Signed VHS cover
- Directed by: Mark Borchardt
- Written by: Mark Borchardt
- Produced by: Mark Borchardt
- Starring: Mark Borchardt; Tom Schimmels; Miriam Frost; Robert Richard Jorge; Mike Schank
- Edited by: Mark Borchardt
- Music by: Patrick Nettesheim
- Production company: Northwest Productions
- Distributed by: Northwest Productions
- Release date: June 12, 1997
- Running time: 36 minutes
- Country: United States
- Language: English

Coven (pronounced KOH-vən) is a 1997 American short independent horror film written, directed by and starring Mark Borchardt. The making of the film was chronicled in the 1999 documentary film American Movie. Coven was shot in black-and-white with local talent around Milwaukee, Wisconsin.

== Plot ==
Mike is a writer struggling with a lack of artistic productivity. To deal with the pressures he feels from within and without, he escalates his abuse of alcohol. One day, when faced with overwhelming deadlines, he takes a large quantity of pills with alcohol, resulting in an overdose and hospitalization. When Steve takes notice of Mike's increasing volatility and isolation, he confronts the defensive writer, showing genuine concern for his friend's self-destructive behavior in the process. It is suggested, by the lack of others at the intervention, that Steve may be the only friend Mike has left. Steve asks Mike to join him at a support group with which he is affiliated and, after gaining some perspective, Mike agrees. Soon, however, Mike comes to realize that the group has a deeper occult agenda and uses extreme, sometimes supernatural, tactics to "help" new members remain clean and sober.

== Cast ==
- Mark Borchardt as Mike
- Tom Schimmels as Steve
- Miriam Frost as Sharon
- Robert Richard Jorge as Goodman
- Sherrie Beaupre as Daesa

Jack Bennett, Mark Nadolski, Scott Berendt, Barbara Zanger, Donna McMaster, Mike Schank, Cindy Snyder, Nancy Williams, and Wayne Bubois play the support group members.

== Sales and distribution ==
Coven was largely funded by Mark's uncle Bill Borchardt's savings with the understanding that Mark had to sell 3,000 copies in order for Bill to make his money back. However, Bill died shortly after the release of Coven. Bill, along with Mark and an assortment of friends and neighbors, star in the film. The movie was sold through the (now defunct) website www.northwestproductions.com. By 2004, Mark had sold 5,100 copies of Coven at $14.95 each.

== Critical reception and legacy ==
On the review aggregator website Rotten Tomatoes, Coven has an approval rating of 43% based on seven reviews, with an average rating of 5.4/10.

Coven established Borchardt as an amateur filmmaker. American Movie helped Borchardt get noticed by a broader audience, which led to him making appearances (along with co-producer Mike Schank) in television programs such as Family Guy and Greg the Bunny, in which they parody scenes from the movie.
