= The Aftermath (1982 film) =

- Directed by: Steve Barkett
- Written by: Steve Barkett
- Produced by: Steve Barkett
- Starring: Steve Barkett; Lynne Margulies; Sid Haig
- Cinematography: Thomas F. Denove; Dennis Skotak
- Edited by: Thomas F. Denove; Dennis Skotak
- Music by: John Morgan
- Release date: March 22, 1982; (USA)
- Running time: 95 minutes
- Country: United States
- Language: English
- Budget: $150,000

The Aftermath (also known as Zombie Aftermath) is a 1982 science fiction horror independent film directed by Steve Barkett.

While not prosecuted for obscenity, the film was seized and confiscated in the UK under Section 3 of the Obscene Publications Act 1959 during the video nasty panic.

== Plot ==
Three astronauts return to Earth after a nuclear holocaust (that also saw biological weapons used), although one dies in a crash landing. The two survivors, Newman and Matthews, encounter some mutants before discovering that Los Angeles has been completely destroyed. Seeking shelter, the men take refuge in an abandoned mansion. Newman later encounters a young boy, Chris, hiding in a museum with the curator.

Before the curator passes away from radiation poisoning, Newman takes Chris under his care. While out seeking supplies one day, Newman and Chris encounter Sarah, who is running from a gang of bandits led by Cutter.

After Sarah's murder, Newman decides to confront the gang at their desert wasteland hideout. After killing Cutter's gang, Newman is fatally wounded by the gang leader, who in turn is shot dead by Chris with a revolver. The boy then walks off alone before the credits roll.

== Cast ==
- Steve Barkett as Newman
- Lynne Margulies as Sarah
- Sid Haig as Cutter
- Christopher Barkett as Chris
- Alfie Martin as Getman
- Forrest J Ackerman as Museum curator
- Jim Danforth as Astronaut Williams
- Linda Stiegler as Helen
- Adrian Torino as Bruce Will
- Levi Shanstan as Arnold Swatch / The Mummy
- Ramon Sumabal as Brad Pet
- Michael Eugene Romero as Silver-ster the Gold
- Jerone Meehleib as The lover Boy Irbo
- Martin Kearns as Victim
- Dick Miller as Radio Announcer

== Production ==
Following his appearance in a handful of films as an actor, Steve Barkett came up with the initial concept of The Aftermath as Barkett wanted a film that while cheap would look nice and touch on themes of disillusionment with the world. Barket initially tried to get the movie made through a partnership with actor Stanley Livingston, but after failure to get financial backing for the film the two dissolved their partnership. A second attempt was made when Barkett teamed up with Jim Danforth, but shortly thereafter disagreements over creative control caused the two to amicably part ways, though Danforth would do a painting for the film's poster and play the role of Williams. In 1977, a producer bought The Aftermath from Barkett and hired him to direct, but conflicts with the director of photography as well as the producer's insistence the title be changed to Invasion of the Mutant People caused the project to collapse. Barkett eventually decided to produce the film independently with money collected from various friends including one who put up $51,000 ($21,000 of which was used to buy back the rights) with the final budget being around $150,000. Robert Skotak created the various matte paintings used in the film.

Steve Barkett screened a rough cut of The Aftermath for Roger Corman as a potential pick-up for New World Pictures. Corman's reaction was mixed and at the suggestion of Corman, Barkett redid several effects shots and cut 15 minutes of footage to improve the pacing.

== Release ==
The film was released in the United States on various VHS labels and in a special edition laserdisc release by the Roan Group. It was released in the UK with the alternate title Zombie Aftermath the film has been released in the United States by VCI ENTERTAINMENT. As of July 2021 it is available to stream on Plex

== Reception ==
Creature Feature gave the movie 3 out of five stars, finding it well written and directed. It also praised the musical score and effects. Fantastic Movie Musings was not as kind, finding the movie script weak and the characters lacking complexity.

== See also ==
- List of zombie short films and undead-related projects
