= Dead Roses =

2004 American gang and horror film

- Directed by: Robert McCorkle
- Produced by: Johnathan Tucker
- Starring: Johnathan Tucker
- Release date: 2005
- Country: United States
- Language: English
- Budget: $5,000

Dead Roses is an American independent zombie horror film written and directed by Robert McCorkle and produced by Johnathan Tucker, who also performs in the film. The film, which Tucker self-described as "Night of the Living Dead in the projects", was independently produced in Brooklyn, New York for $5,000.

== Plot ==
A woman's fiancé played by Marcus Collins is killed by a drug dealing gang. For revenge, the woman conjures up a zombie to hunt down the gang members and kill them.

== Production ==
Tucker and McCorkle first began working on the film shortly after meeting at an investment banking firm. The two decided to create their own low-budget film using Hi-8 and Mini DV video cameras, filming in public housing projects and performing editing on a personal computer. McCorkle also taught himself rudimentary special effects techniques for the film, stating that "Just because we're low-budget doesn't mean it can't be realistic—at least movie-realistic." Apart from being the writer, director, and make-up artist, McCorkle also served as the grip and caterer.

== See also ==
- List of zombie short films and undead-related projects
