= Rising Up: The Story of the Zombie Rights Movement =

- Theatrical release poster
- Directed by: Laura Moss
- Written by: Hugh Mackey; Laura Moss; Brendan J. O'Brien
- Produced by: Geoff Celis; Brendan J. O'Brien; Dan Przygoda
- Starring: Kevin Allison; William Broderick; Rae C. Wright; Kirk Larsen; Doug Paulson; Teresa Bass
- Cinematography: Hugh Mackey
- Edited by: Hugh Mackey
- Music by: Chris Chappell
- Release date: April 24, 2009 (United States)
- Running time: 27 minutes
- Country: United States
- Language: English

Rising Up: The Story of the Zombie Rights Movement is a 2009 American short film-mockumentary about the history of a fictional zombie rights movement in the USA. Produced in the style of a History Channel documentary, the comedy debuted on 24 April 2009 at the Boston International Film Festival.

== Plot ==
In the course of the political and cultural turbulence surrounding the civil rights movement that emerged in the 1960s, groups of hippies and beatniks formed the National Allied Zombie Initiative (N.A.Z.I.), a movement to promote the civil rights of zombies, which has since been neglected and forgotten. Their aim was the equality and social integration of zombies into society. So far, zombies have been interned by the US Army to ward off a possible Soviet invasion, have been abused as test objects in crash tests or in the cosmetics industry, or have been killed for no reason. The film reports on the fragile beginnings of the movement in Pittsburgh about its heyday when living and undead activists took the capital Washington D. C. by storm and zombies achieved, albeit only temporarily, equality with full suffrage. Finally, the film concludes with the tragic story of Chocolate Chip, one of the heroic leaders of the movement.

== Awards ==
At the Boston International Film Festival in April 2009, Laura Moss received the award for best director in the short film category.

== Reception ==
Monica Valentinelli from flamesrising.com judges the film: "At less than thirty minutes, I thought this was–by far–the best zombie video I’d seen in a long time. The cinematography has a collage-like feel to it and the voiceover sounds exactly like someone you might hear on the History channel."
