= Jonathan London =

American film director

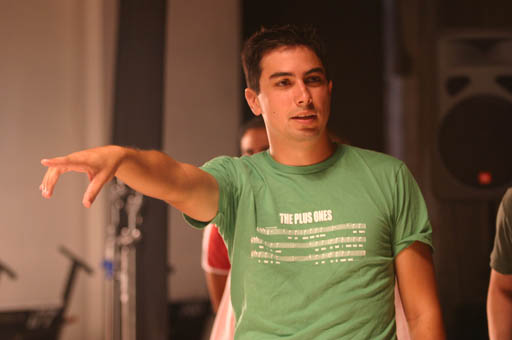
- London directing a music video for Reggie and the Full Effect
- Born: December 5, 1978 (age 47); Austin, Texas, United States
- Occupations: Music video director, film director, screenwriter, film producer
- Website: https://www.geekscape.net

Jonathan London (born December 5, 1978) is an American director, screenwriter, and producer.

== Early life ==
London was born in Austin, Texas. He is a 2001 graduate from the University of Pennsylvania and completed the graduate film program at Columbia University in 2006.

Competed in the 1990 Nintendo World Championships.

== Career ==
London is the former host of the podcast Geekdrome and currently hosts the podcast and news network Geekscape. In 2006, London directed the live DVD portion of Reel Big Fish's Our Live Album Is Better Than Your Live Album. In 2009, London became the head writer and a correspondent for the online show Heads Up! on CraveOnline. And in 2012–2013, he was the host of Pause/Play on Metacafe. His directing credits include music videos such as "Turn Out the Light" for The New Amsterdams, "Exit Emergency" for Houston Calls, "Take Me Home Please" for Reggie and the Full Effect, and "Come Back Home" for Suburban Legends. He also directed Gay By Dawn, a short film that won a number of film festival awards.

In 2009, Fox Television Studios' 15 Gigs released the two short web series Singledom and When Ninjas Attack for Hulu, both of which London wrote and directed. 2014 saw the release of London's Miami Vice comic book series for Lion Forge Comics as well as the SXSW premiere of Doc of the Dead on which he was a co-producer and contributing director. In 2015, London was one of 12 directors accepted to the Warner Brothers TV Directing Workshop. In 2016 and 2017, Jonathan was awarded invitations to the Stowe Screenwriting Fellowship for his feature script 'Commitment'.

== Personal life ==
London is the older brother of professional wrestler Paul London, best known for his time in the WWE.
