= Night of the Living Bread =

- Directed by: Kevin S. O'Brien
- Starring: Vince Ware; Katie Harris; Robert J. Saunders; Gina Saunders; Kevin S. O'Brien; Stephen R. Newell; Steve Herminghausen; Michael R. Saunders; Bread
- Music by: Ken Hymes; Wenda Williamson
- Distributed by: Columbia Pictures: (1993 TV)
- Release date: 1990
- Running time: 8 minutes
- Country: United States
- Language: English

Night of the Living Bread is a 1990 American independent short film comedic parody of Night of the Living Dead, directed by Kevin S. O'Brien. Bread comes to life, spreads its condition throughout the United States, and preys on the living in this eight-minute film.

== Plot ==
Two people are attacked in a cemetery by slices of bread, which is hurled at them. One of them is killed, the other escapes in their car as more bread hurls itself at the car from offscreen.

She makes it to a farmhouse where she and others are besieged by rampant slices of killer bread. One person is smothered to death, leaving behind a corpse strewn with white bread. News reports speculate that an explosion at a bakery is animating all manner of bread. During Catholic Mass in an emergency shelter, the worshippers are attacked by Communion wafers.

The group in the farmhouse fortify their defences, using toasters (instead of torches) to frighten off the bread, and barricading the doors and windows with sandwich bags (instead of wooden planks). Two women seek refuge in the basement, unaware that there is a lunch bag next to them. The bread inside kills them and one of the men, leaving only one person alive. Meanwhile, the two hamburger buns float away from the women they kill. At the end of the film, the sole survivor is smothered by the bread.

== Cast ==
- Vince Ware as Ben
- Katie Harris as Barbra
- Robert J. Saunders as Tom
- Gina Saunders as Judy
- Kevin S. O'Brien (credited as Wolfgang S. Saunders) as Jeff Drexel
- Stephen R. Newell as Father Brye
- Steve Herminghausen as Johnny
- Michael R. Saunders as Body
- Bread (specifically sliced bread, Communion wafers and hamburger buns) as itself

== Recognition ==
Of its screening at the 1993 Zombie Jamboree in Pittsburgh, the Pittsburgh Post-Gazette called the film "a hilarious black and white parody". The film was picked up by Columbia Pictures after it aired on WPGH. A tribute to this film was aired during an episode of the TV series Bump in the Night. Of its addition to the 2002 Night of the Living Dead "Millennium Edition", DVD Talk opined "It's hilarious and a clever addition to the disc".

== Release ==
This short is included on the 1994 Elite Entertainment laserdisc, 1995 "Special Collector's Edition Digitally Remastered 2 Tape Set" VHS edition from Anchor Bay Entertainment and the 2002 DVD "Millennium Edition" of Night of the Living Dead, released by Elite Entertainment.
