= Fist of Jesus =

- Film poster
- Directed by: Adrián Cardona; David Muñoz (director)
- Written by: David Muñoz
- Produced by: Eskoria Films; David Muñoz; Marc Velasco; Paco Ferrari; Monica Murguia
- Starring: Marc Velasco; Noé Blancafort; Salvador Llós; Victoria Roldán; Roger Sotera; José María Angorrilla; Enrique Villalonga; Juan Marí Susierra; Fernando Alfaya; Fito Delgado; Pedro E. Martínez
- Cinematography: Paco Ferrari
- Edited by: Adriana Cardona; David Muñoz
- Music by: J. Oskura Najera
- Production company: Eskoria Films
- Distributed by: Eskoria Films
- Release date: 12 October 2012
- Running time: 15 minutes (14’ 42’’)
- Country: Spain
- Language: Spanish

Fist of Jesus is a 2012 Spanish splatter comedy short film about Jesus Christ in a zombie apocalypse.

== Plot ==
During a sermon, Jesus learns from Jacob that Jacob's son Lazarus has died. Jesus promises Jacob to resurrect him. Lazarus is resurrected, but as a zombie. He attacks Jacob and Jesus can only barely escape alongside Judas. The zombie epidemic spreads rapidly, as Jesus and Judas run from the zombie hordes, which now include the Roman occupying forces and a gang of cowboys. Judas hangs himself out of panic, but is successfully resurrected by Jesus.

When the pair are surrounded by zombies, Jesus asks Judas for a weapon, receiving only a fish. Jesus then multiplies the fish, which he and Judas use to kill the zombies. After a bloody battle, Judas laments that they were unable to evangelize anyone. Jesus reassures him by saying that they have at least sent many souls to Heaven.

The plot of Fist of Jesus and the accompanying short films are peppered with visual references to special effects from other great horror and splatter films.

== Cast ==
- Marc Velasco as Jesus Christ
- Noé Blancafort as Judas
- Salvador Llós as Jakob
- Victoria Roldánas Sara
- Roger Sotera as Lazarus
- José María Angorrilla as Cowboy-Boss
- Enrique Villalonga as Roman
- Juan Marí Susierraas Roman
- Fernando Alfaya as Roman
- Fito Delgado as Roman
- Pedro E. Martínez as Roman

== Background ==
Muñoz and Cardona originally planned a feature-length film entitled Once Upon a Time in Jerusalem, for which Fist of Jesus would serve as a teaser along with other Fist of Jesus short films such as: The Blind Man, Healings, Canaan Weddings, The First Miracle and Joshua and the Fist of Jesus DVD. However, a crowdfunding campaign launched for the feature-length film did not raise enough capital, so the project was put on hold for the time being. The DVD of the short film features a trailer of the project, cancelled and messed up scenes, as well as a making of.

In October 2014 KISS ltd. released a PC game entitled Fist of Jesus - The Bloody Gospel of Judas. In this cartoon-like game developed by Mutant Games Judas and Jesus have to fight off attacking zombies in 60 levels, but meanwhile (as of December 2019) the game is no longer available.

On 30 April 2015 Austrian Illusions Unltd. Films released Fist of Jesus as German dubbed version on DVD and Blu-ray.

== Reception ==
Fist of Jesus was predominantly positively evaluated.

Adrian Halen from HNN Horrornews.net judges the film: "Great special Fx and gory bits make this unexpected extreme piece fun and gross all in the same bundle. … David Muñoz and team know how to bust up dead corpses with glorious visual work while still keeping the action footage alive and wacky."

Peter Osteried judges on the German website gamona.de: "Das Ding ist schnell, es rockt und es gibt keine Sekunde Leerlauf." ("This thing (movie) is fast, it rocks and there is not a second idle.") The website schnittberichte.com calls the film: "… leicht amateurhaften Splatter für zwischendurch … bei dem Fans auf ihre Kosten kommen."(“… slightly amateurish splatter for in-between … where fans get their money's worth”). GIGA editor Leo Schmidt rates Fist of Jesus as: "… ultrabrualen … aber feinen feinen Trash-Streifen“ ("… ultra brutal … but fine trash flick").

== Awards ==
Fist of Jesus has been screened at numerous international fantasy, trash and short film festivals and has received more than 70 awards, including jury and audience awards, as well as awards for best film and special effects. David Muñoz and Adrián Cardona were nominated for the Grand Prize for Short Film at the 2013 Bucheon International Fantastic Film Festival.

The film poster for Fist of Jesus is based on the poster of the 1979 Monty Python comedy The Life of Brian and received a CinEuphoria Award in 2014.
