= Zombie Hunters: City of the Dead =

- Genre: Horror
- Created by: Patrick Devaney
- Starring: Patrick Devaney
- Country of origin: United States
- Original language: English

Original release
- Release: 2007 – 2014

Zombie Hunters: City of the Dead is an independent television series produced in New York City, notable as being the first broadcast zombie-based television series. It details the lives of a group of friends banding together to survive the epidemic resurrection of dead humans. These re-animated corpses are driven by a need to feed, and only attack living humans. Conceived in 2005 by series creator Patrick Devaney, the show isn't so much about the zombies themselves and the fight against them; it's really about how the decisions characters make to survive to change them in profound ways.

The main character of Billy Cassidy (portrayed by Devaney) is an Irish Catholic whose violent actions are in direct conflict with his faith, often resulting in an inner conflict that quickly manifests itself in external ways. Paul Michael Bates and John Salazar (played by Christopher J. Murphy and Rick Martinez, respectively) are Cassidy's main partners, and they are later joined by Dr Rebecca Kaufman (Linnet Brooks) and Carrie Walker, RN (Teri Hansen). This constitutes the first main group of "hunters" in the first season.

Though their personalities are vastly different from each other, their situation forces them all to find some common ground in order to make it through the ongoing crisis. There is also an underlying Judeo-Christian religious theme running through the series, which becomes more apparent in later episodes. In addition to this is everything Zombiephiles have come to expect from the genre: many firearms being used to shoot Zombies in the head, and graphic depictions of people being eaten alive (through practical effects created by SFX artist Michael A. Scardillo), as well as all the emotional turmoil and psychological suspense that comes along with surviving a zombie apocalypse.

Later television series of a similar nature appeared and showcased far too familiar storylines, resulting in conflict and controversy. To date, the show has aired on over 80 public access and public television stations across the US. Each episode is independently produced and funded through Devarez Films, LLC, and is distributed in the US through Wild Eye Releasing.

The series is produced Devarez Films.

== Season One Episode Guide ==
"Pilot" (original airdate: 20 Dec. 2007)

The story picks up several weeks into the Zombie incident, showing the first incarnation of the Hunters, and then flashes back to the first time they actually sought-out the carnivorous bodies with the intention of exterminating them.

"Two" (original airdate: 31 Jan. 2008)

As the situation grows more deadly, the Zombie Hunters go searching for a young girl who has gone missing from a nearby park. Can they find her in time before the zombies claim her?

"Three" (original airdate: 15 Apr. 2008)

Billy Cassidy visits St. John's Hospital in the hope that his paramedic girlfriend, Judy Moskowitz, has returned. But the hospital staff has their hands full protecting both themselves and the patients when a zombie gets loose in the building.

"Four" (original airdate: 5 Jul. 2008)

Cassidy, pushed by Bates and Joey, takes all their money to buy some guns from a small group of survivalists. But something isn't right about these "survivalists" and if they aren't careful, zombies will be the least of their concerns.

"Revenge" (original airdate: 15 Jan. 2009)

Billy Cassidy and Paul Michael Bates vow to get revenge on the militia group after the weapons deal does wrong. In their haste, Bates and Cassidy leave their wounded friend Joey with nurse Carrie Walker and Dr Rebecca Kaufman.

"Things Fall Apart" (original airdate: 3 Sep. 2009)

The group realizes that the Zombie infection may not be an infection at all. Billy, conflicted by his Irish Catholic guilt, needs to confront his demons and he seeks out the advice of a childhood mentor. Meanwhile, Bates decides to leave the group and goes off on his own in order to liquidate some of the assets he acquired when they dealt with the militia. However, he soon learns that there's greater safety in numbers when he tries to make a new deal with a house full of sociopaths.

"The Warehouse: Part I" (original airdate: 15 Aug. 2010)

Billy Cassidy and his group have a meeting with Dr Rowena Lambick, a scientist who claims to have developed a cure for the zombie plague. Moreover, Cassidy and company team up with another vigilante group from the Bronx for a raid on a warehouse.

"The Warehouse: Part II" (original airdate: 15 Sept. 2010)

"Resolution: Part I" (original airdate: 30 Nov. 2010)

Following the horrific events of the previous month, the government claims to have put an end to the undead problem. But the zombie hunters are suspicious of this good news, and with good reason: a terrorist group aiming to exploit the recent resurrections are planning a horrific crime!

"Resolution: Part II" (original airdate: 31 Jan. 2011)

== Season Two Episode Guide ==
"Zombies, Terrorists, & Looters: Part I" (original airdate: 31 Oct. 2012)

The aftermath of the terrorist attack on the Koala Chemical plant is swift and violent, with hundreds of thousands of re-animated corpses spreading out in both directions from central Long Island. John and his family are trapped in Suffolk County and the Zombie Hunters decide to brave the onslaught and try to rescue them. But they are cornered behind a building that has already been claimed by a group of looters. When the National Guard arrives with orders to shoot anything that moves, these unlikely allies have to band together to survive the rest of the night.

"Zombies, Terrorists, & Looters: Part II" (original airdate: 1 Aug. 2013)

"Zombies, Terrorists, & Looters: Part II B" (original airdate: 3 Mar. 2014)
