= Mike Schank =

American musician and filmmaker (1966–2022)

- Schank in American Movie (1999)
- Born: Mikel Joseph Schank; March 1, 1966; Milwaukee, Wisconsin, U.S.
- Died: October 13, 2022 (aged 56); Milwaukee, Wisconsin, U.S.
- Occupations: Actor; musician
- Spouse: Kate Schank (Toohey)

Mikel Joseph Schank (March 1, 1966 – October 13, 2022) was an American actor and musician. He was close friends with independent filmmaker Mark Borchardt and helped Borchardt make the 1997 short horror film Coven. He appeared with Borchardt in the 1999 documentary film American Movie, for which Schank also provided music.

A resident of Milwaukee, Wisconsin, Schank later appeared in the films Storytelling (2001) and Hamlet A.D.D. (2014), and made a cameo appearance as himself alongside Borchardt in a 2006 episode of Family Guy. As a musician, Schank recorded three homemade CDs, including Dreams I Know—Yesternight (2009), which features Schank playing acoustic guitar along with drum loops, samples, and spoken recollections of his dreams.

Schank died on October 13, 2022, at the age of 56.

== Career ==
Schank began learning how to play guitar at the age of six.

Schank is best known for his appearance in American Movie, a 1999 American documentary film about the making of the short horror film Coven. In the documentary, Schank is presented as the childhood friend of independent filmmaker Mark Borchardt, Coven's director. Schank is shown acting in and assisting with the production of Coven; also showcased is his ability to play guitar, including while blindfolded. The score for American Movie was provided by Schank.

American Movie was a critical success, premiering at the 1999 Sundance Film Festival and winning the festival's Grand Jury Prize for Documentary that year. The Boston Globe's Betsy Sherman called Schank "the movie's inadvertent scene-stealer", and Drake Bentley and Piet Levy of the Milwaukee Journal Sentinel retrospectively wrote that Schank's "deadpan humor and quiet sweetness in [American] Movie made him a beloved, unforgettable figure." Schank and Borchardt would regularly attend screenings of the documentary (along with the film's director, Chris Smith, and co-producer Sarah Price) and became minor celebrities in the film festival circuit. On March 11, 2001, the Price-directed documentary Caesar's Park premiered at South by Southwest (SXSW) in Austin, Texas; that night, at a party for the film at Club Deville attended by Price and Smith, Schank performed songs by Black Sabbath and Metallica while Borchardt interacted with fans.

The DVD release of American Movie, as well as a website created to promote the film, provided Schank's home phone number, allowing fans from around the world to call him; among the notable people who reportedly called "The Mike Line" were filmmaker Edgar Wright, actors Simon Pegg and Nick Frost, and musicians Steve Vai, Jason Newsted, and Angus Young.

Schank went on to appear in the "Nonfiction" segment of the 2001 film Storytelling, as the cameraman of a hapless documentary filmmaker named Toby Oxman, played by Paul Giamatti.

Alongside Borchardt, Schank appeared on The Late Show with David Letterman, where he met one of his musical idols, Gene Simmons of the band Kiss. Schank and Borchardt also appeared on an episode of The New Tom Green Show in 2003, and, in 2006, made cameo appearances as themselves in an episode of Family Guy and an episode of Greg the Bunny. Schank also had roles in the 2009 film Modus Operandi and the 2014 film Hamlet A.D.D.. Around 2009, Schank also starred in a commercial for Golia, a brand of Italian mints.

Outside of his film and television appearances, Schank recorded three homemade CDs—Songs I Know (2000), Classical Songs I Know (2008), and Dreams I Know—Yesternight (2009). Dreams I Know features Schank recalling the details of dreams that he had noted in a diary, along with instrumentation performed on acoustic guitar, as well as drum loops and samples. In a 2002 interview, Schank stated that he would rather "freak someone out at a party at Mark's house at how well I can play guitar" than act in movies.

== Personal life ==
Schank lived on the East Side of Milwaukee, Wisconsin, with his wife Kate. In a 2012 radio interview, Schank stated that he and Borchardt continued to stay in close contact following the release of American Movie, talking to each other every day.

A former alcoholic and drug addict, Schank was a member of the Milwaukee Alano Club, a local sobriety and recovery group. In American Movie, Schank recounts that he once almost died from a PCP overdose. He is also shown buying scratch-off tickets, saying that, "When you play the lottery, sometimes you win and sometimes you lose. But it's better than using drugs or alcohol, because when you use drugs and alcohol, especially drugs, you always lose." Schank shared his sobriety milestones on social media, and celebrated his "27 years clean and sober birthday" in August 2022.

== Death ==
In June 2022, Schank revealed in a Facebook post that he was diagnosed with cancer, writing:

I've been diagnosed with a rare type of cancer recently. It started in my esophagus and spread to my liver and lungs and a bunch of other places in my body. It's stage 4 and they can't cure it but they are going to try to get it under control with radiation and chemotherapy.

Jackie Bogenberger, a fellow member of the Milwaukee Alano Club, stated that he underwent both radiation and chemotherapy, and that, "One of the last things Mike said to me was, 'Hey Jackie, I feel really bad for children who have cancer. They should never have to.'"

Schank died on October 13, at the age of 56. A friend of Schank's told the Milwaukee Record that he "passed away early this morning in his mother's arms." The news of his death was met with statements of tribute from a number of actors, filmmakers, and other admirers, including Borchardt, Mark Duplass, Patton Oswalt, Taika Waititi, Rainn Wilson, Elijah Wood, and Edgar Wright.

A Celebration of Life event was held at the Milwaukee Alano Club in November 2022 in honor of Schank. Schank was active with the organization up until his death.

== Filmography ==
=== Film ===
| Year | Title | Role | Notes | Ref(s) |
|---|---|---|---|---|
| 1997 | Coven | Group Member | | |
| 1999 | American Movie | Himself | Documentary film; also composer | |
| 2001 | Storytelling | Cameraman | | |
| 2002 | Britney, Baby, One More Time | Mike Schmitz | | |
| 2009 | Modus Operandi | Zombie | | |
| 2014 | Hamlet A.D.D. | Gravedigger's Friend | | |
| 2021 | Toys Storage. The Animation Madness | Humans | | |
| TBA | Snapshot | Cab Driver | Post-Production | |

=== Television ===
| Year | Title | Role | Notes | Ref(s) |
|---|---|---|---|---|
| 2006 | Family Guy | Himself | Episode: "Brian Sings and Swings" | |
| 2006 | Greg the Bunny | Himself | Episode: "The Passion of the Easter Bunny: A Fabricated American Movie" | |

== Discography ==
- Songs I Know (2000)
- Classical Songs I Know (2008)
- Dreams I Know—Yesternight (2009)
