= Gay By Dawn =

2004 short film directed by Jonathan London

Gay By Dawn is a 10-minute short film written and directed by Jonathan London as his non-thesis film at Columbia University. The story revolves around four redneck hunters in the woods telling ghost stories. Soon, their stories begin to get the best of them.

Gay By Dawn was filmed from February 12 to February 14, 2004, in Dripping Springs, Texas. The film went on to win a number of awards, including:

- Best Comedy, 2005 Dixie Film Festival in Atlanta, Georgia
- Best Humor/Parody Film Award, 2005 San Diego Comic-Con
- The College Narrative Award, 2005 Carolina Film and Video Festival
- Best Comedy, 2004 Cincinnati International Festival of Horror

The film's title song was recorded by Dynamite Boy.
