= Living Dead Girl (novel) =

Young adult novel written by Elizabeth Scot

- First edition
- Author: Elizabeth Scott
- Country: United States
- Language: English
- Publisher: Simon Pulse
- Published: September 2, 2008

Living Dead Girl is a young adult novel written by Elizabeth Scott. The story follows a girl called "Alice" who has been kidnapped by a pedophile named Ray.

== Synopsis ==
"Alice" is a 15-year-old girl who lives with Ray, a man everyone assumes to be her father, but who in actuality abducted her five years earlier. Ray has deprived her of food in order to maintain her petite frame, dresses her in childlike clothing, rapes her daily, and makes her sit in a chair as punishment when she "misbehaves". Alice refers to herself as a "Living Dead Girl" and anticipates the day Ray finally decides to kill her as he did the girl that he had abducted before her, the "First Alice", whom he kept until her body began maturing. Her body was discovered, but he was never suspected. Ray has completely brainwashed Alice into believing that any attempts at escape will result in him finding her and killing her family, so she "stays in line" even as she is left alone in Ray's apartment all day while he is at work, even going to get bikini waxes done by herself.

One day, Ray tells Alice he wants her to find him a "New Alice" for him. Alice hopes that if she does, he will either free or kill her, but he explains that he expects her to train the new Alice to his liking. Alice takes trips down to a local playground to monitor the young girls who play there, writing down all her observations in a notebook. On one of her visits, she meets Lucy, a young girl who likes to swing. After Lucy tells Alice that she doesn't like her, Alice decides that Lucy will be the one to replace her.

Alice meets Lucy's older brother, Jake, a troubled teenager who abuses prescription drugs. She has sex with him in an attempt to learn more about Lucy, obtaining some information about her hobbies and schedule. Before she leaves, she meets a police officer who senses that Alice is in trouble; fearing that talking to the police will only get her in trouble with Ray, she declines to say anything. When Ray accuses Alice of lying to him about Lucy's whereabouts, Alice becomes confused, as Jake told her that Lucy would be at a local swimming pool.

Alice returns to the park to find Lucy. She tries to warn her about Ray, but he appears and grabs Lucy by the arm. With what little energy she has left in her hollow body, Alice shouts for Lucy to run. An enraged Ray tries to strangle Alice. Jake fatally shoots Ray, inadvertently wounding Alice in the process. As she lies dying, Alice tells Lucy that her real name is Kyla Davis, then divulges her home address before asking Lucy to take her home. Alice's final thought before the book ends is "I am free."

== Major characters ==
- Alice — She was kidnapped by Ray, who sexually and physically abused her, and is now in her teens. She feels emotionally numb after suffering years of abuse, and wants only to die. She's charged by her abductor to find and train her own "replacement".
- Ray — The antagonist in the book. Ray was sexually abused by his mother as a child and is now taking out his pain by abusing young girls, all of whom he calls Alice.
- Lucy — The little girl Alice is planning to bring to Ray. When she tells Ray of her discovery, he renames Lucy "Annabel".
- Jake — Lucy's older brother. He promises Alice that he will save her.
- Barbara — The police officer who questions and talks to Alice at the park.

== Reception ==
In the assessment of Publishers Weekly, "Scott's prose is spare and damning, relying on suggestive details and their impact on Alice to convey the unimaginable violence she repeatedly experiences. Disturbing but fascinating, the book exerts an inescapable grip on readers—like Alice, they have virtually no choice but to continue until the conclusion sets them free." The book also received multiple reviews elsewhere. The novel was also recommended in a range of other fora:

- 2010 International Reading Association Young Adults' Choices Pick
- 2010 YALSA Popular Paperback
- 2010 YALSA Amazing Audiobook
- 2009 YALSA Best Book for Young Adults
- 2009 YALSA Quick Pick for Reluctant Readers
- 2009 Amelia Bloomer Project Young Adult Fiction Pick
- 2008 BCCB Blue Ribbon Award Winner
- Cynsations Cynsational Book of 2008
