= Mark Borchardt =

American independent filmmaker

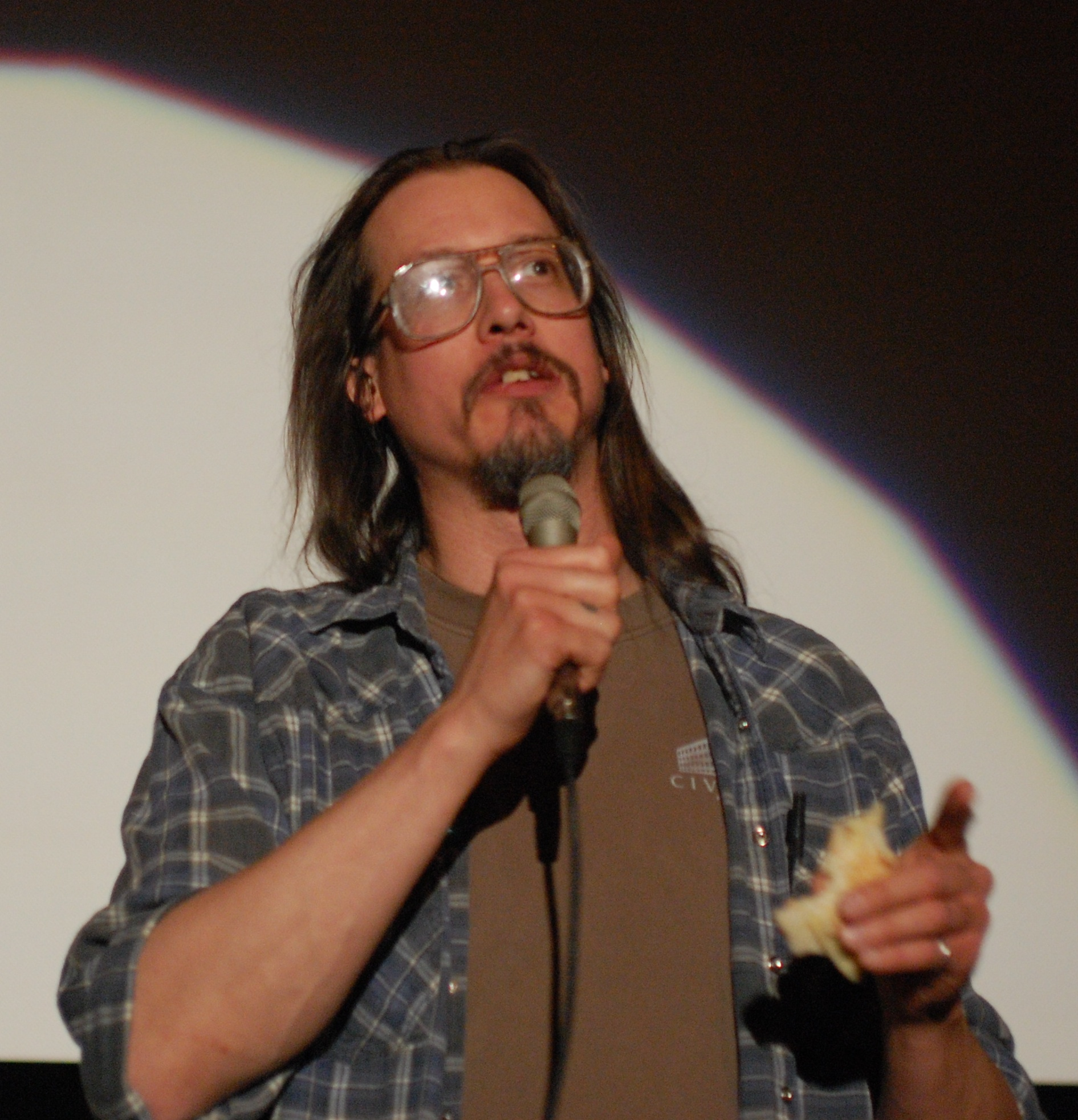
- Borchardt speaks at a preview screening of The Hagstone Demon at the Riverview Theater in Minneapolis on May 8, 2008.
- Born: August 20, 1966 (age 60); Menomonee Falls, Wisconsin
- Occupations: Filmmaker; actor
- Children: 3

Mark Borchardt (born August 20, 1966) is an American independent filmmaker. He is best known as the subject of the 1999 film American Movie, which documented three years he spent writing, shooting and editing his horror short Coven (1997).

== Early life ==
Borchardt was born and raised in Menomonee Falls, Wisconsin. His mother Monica is Swedish. He started making films at the age of fourteen with a super-8 camera that was given to him by a neighbor. After serving three years in the military, he continued his cinematic endeavors at the local university. In the mid-nineties, he wrote and produced Halloween radio dramas which were broadcast annually and won a fellowship from the Milwaukee Art Futures Board.

== Career ==
Filmmakers Chris Smith and Sarah Price began filming Borchardt while he was attempting to put together funding for his unfinished feature Northwestern. After the project collapsed, Borchardt decided instead to finish Coven, which he had started years earlier. After Coven was completed, Smith and Price compiled their footage into American Movie, which was picked up by Sony Classics and won the Grand Jury Prize at the 1999 Sundance Film Festival.

Since then Borchardt has been active appearing on television and in movies. Borchardt made five appearances on Late Show with David Letterman, including serving as Letterman's 2000 election correspondent. He made several TV appearances on The Show with No Name, a show in Austin, TX, between 2000 and 2003. In 2004, he played himself in a cameo appearance on the television cartoon series Family Guy, along with friend and American Movie co-star Mike Schank. He and Mike also had their own series on Zero TV, Mark and Mike and, in 2006, Mark and Mike hosted a national television special called Night of the Living Dead: LIVE from Wisconsin on Halloween night.

Borchardt has appeared in several movies, including The One (2001), The Tunnel (2001), Abby Singer, & The Godfather of Green Bay (2005). Borchardt also starred in Modus Operandi (2009), played a gravedigger in the partially animated comedy Hamlet A.D.D. (2014), had a leading role in the horror feature The Hagstone Demon (2011), and played Mr. Englan in the directorial debut of fellow Milwaukee filmmaker Jozef K. Richards, The Amateur Monster Movie (2011). In addition, Borchardt also made a cameo in the music video for the Leslie and the Ly's song "Zombie Killer" featuring Elvira, Mistress of the Dark on guest vocals.

He has contributed to Kevin Lindenmuth's 2001 book, The Independent Film Experience (ISBN 0786410752 ) and had his short stories published in magazines. Borchardt is one of a trio of hosts on "Cinema Fireside," a weekly film discussion show on WXRW 104.1 in Milwaukee.

In 2004, he announced he would direct Scare Me and sent out casting calls. In 2008, he announced a 2009 release date, which was originally slated for a 2005 release. As of Summer 2010 the movie was still in production and as of 2023, it still has not been released. In April 2012, Borchardt stated that about 65% of the film had been shot, and that he was happy with the first forty pages of the script. However, he maintained parts of the script needed to be revised and while he had rough-cut some of the footage, there was no completion date in place for the project. In a March 2013 update for the Scare Me IMDb page, the release date was set for April 1, 2014.

In 2018 he directed a documentary called The Dundee Project, which focused on attendees of a UFO festival in Wisconsin. The film premiered at Slamdance Film Festival (Park City), then played at Fantastic Fest (Austin), Nitehawk Cinema (Brooklyn), and the Chicago Critics Film Festival.

== Personal life ==
Borchardt has three children.

== Filmography ==
=== As director ===
Year	Film	Director	Writer	Producer	Editor
1997	Coven	Yes	Yes	Yes	Yes
2018	The Dundee Project	Yes	Yes	No	No

=== As actor/subject ===
Year	Film	Role
1997	Coven	Mike
1999	American Movie	Self
2001	The One	Cesar
2001	The Tunnel	Lincoln
2002	Britney Baby, One More Time	Dude Schmitz
2003	Living Dead Girl	Jesus
2005	The Godfather of Green Bay	Skeeter
2005	Zombie Island	Al the drunk at the bar
2006	Family Guy (TV)	Himself
2007	Confession Stand	Theatre Manager
2007	The Devil's Muse	Floyd
2008	First Bass	Principal Papalschmeck
2009	Living Arrangements	Paul
2009	Unholy Reunion	Douglas - Interviewee
2009	Tapioca	Harve
2009	Dozers	Gawker
2009	Modus Operandi	Dallas Deacon
2009	Cabin Fever 2: Spring Fever	Herman
2011	The Amateur Monster Movie	Mr. Englan
2011	The Hagstone Demon	Douglas Elmore
2012	Heavy Hands	The Mechanic
2014	Hamlet A.D.D.	Gravedigger
2014	Two Rivers	Dirke
2016	Here Comes Rusty	Oren
2016	I Am an Alien	Mark
2019	Black Licorice	Martin Milo
2020	Faith Based	Mark
2020	Small Town Wisconsin	Store Clerk
2004–present	Scare Me	Jeff Lavelle
2018–2021	Joe Pera Talks with You	Gordy/Guy at Bar
2026	Miracle Whip	Rathke's Dad

=== Music videos ===
Video	Band	
"Dead Pan"	Big D and the Kids Table	
"Garden of Secrecy"	Tenement	
"Semantics"	Tapebenders	
“Band Practice/ Uptowner Girl”	SOUP MOAT	
“Alley Tussle”	IONEYE	2026

=== Unrealized Projects ===
- Northwestern
- Scare Me
