= American Movie =

1999 documentary directed by Chris Smith

- Promotional release poster
- Directed by: Chris Smith
- Produced by: Sarah Price; Chris Smith
- Cinematography: Chris Smith
- Edited by: Barry Poltermann; Jun Diaz
- Music by: Mike Schank
- Production companies: C-Hundred Film Corporation; Civilian Pictures; Bluemark Productions; Northwestern Movie Company
- Distributed by: Sony Pictures Classics
- Release date: January 1999
- Running time: 107 minutes
- Country: United States
- Language: English
- Box office: $1.2 million

American Movie (Note: It appears as American Movie: The Making of Northwestern on the title screen, though the movie focuses on the production of Coven.) is a 1999 American documentary film directed by Chris Smith, produced by Smith and Sarah Price, and edited by Jun Diaz and Barry Poltermann.

Filmed between September 1995 and August 1997, American Movie documents the making of Coven, an independent short horror film directed by Mark Borchardt. Produced for the purpose of raising capital for Northwestern, a feature film Borchardt intends to make, Coven suffers from numerous setbacks, including poor financing, a lack of planning, Borchardt's alcoholism, and the ineptitude of the friends and family he enlists as his production team. The documentary follows Borchardt's filmmaking process, interspersed with footage from both of Borchardt's developing projects. The filmmakers shot 90 hours of footage on 16mm film.

American Movie received positive reviews and won the Grand Jury Prize for Documentary at the 1999 Sundance Film Festival. It has since become a cult film.

== Synopsis ==
Mark Borchardt of Menomonee Falls, Wisconsin, dreams of being a professional filmmaker. Currently, however, he delivers newspapers for a living, is deeply in debt, still lives with his parents, suffers from alcoholism, and is estranged from his ex-girlfriend, who is threatening to move out of state with their three children due in part to his inability to pay child support. He acknowledges his various failures, but aspires to one day make more of his life.

Hoping to jump-start his career, Mark restarts production on Northwestern, a feature film he has been planning for most of his adult life. Northwestern attracts some interest from the group of amateur actors with whom Mark has produced some radio plays, but by the fourth production meeting almost no one shows up and Mark is forced to acknowledge that he currently lacks the resources to continue the project.

In order to attract the attention and financial resources needed to produce Northwestern, Mark decides to complete Coven (which he mispronounces with a long 'o' as /ˈkoʊvən/), a horror short that he began shooting in 1994 but ultimately abandoned. He receives financing from his uncle Bill, an increasingly senile retiree who lives in a dilapidated trailer despite having $280,000 in his bank account. Bill hesitantly agrees to invest in Coven with the goal of selling three thousand VHS copies, which Mark says will raise enough capital to finance Northwestern.

Although Mark is hard-working and knowledgeable about filmmaking, he is also poor at planning ahead and is inarticulate as a director. He builds his production crew out of friends, family, and neighbors, many of whom are incompetent at their assigned tasks. Particular attention is given to his best friend Mike Schank, an amiable recovering alcoholic and drug addict who is one of the most reliable members of the crew. Mark and Mike bonded over their shared love of vodka as adolescents, but Mike is now sober and has joined Alcoholics Anonymous, though he has become a compulsive gambler; he reasons that, while you sometimes win and sometimes lose the lottery, "when you use drugs or alcohol...you always lose."

As work on Coven continues, Mark faces the skepticism of his family and his deepening alcoholism, though he does eventually wrap principal photography. At Thanksgiving dinner and later at a Super Bowl XXXI watch party, he gets drunk and becomes alternately agitated, cheery, and despondent. He wistfully watches footage he had shot for Northwestern in 1990 and contemplates whether or not he is a failure.

After an extended post-production process, during which Mark occasionally sleeps in an editing room at the University of Wisconsin–Milwaukee, Coven is finally finished minutes before its premiere at a theater in Milwaukee in the summer of 1997. The screening sells out, and Mark's family and friends are happy that the project has finally been completed.

Mark visits Uncle Bill and discusses the prospect of future fame and wealth and realizing the American Dream. The closing text reveals that Bill died on September 13, 1997, leaving Mark $50,000 towards completing Northwestern. (Note: Decades later, Northwestern remains uncompleted.)

== Reception and legacy ==
On the review aggregation website Rotten Tomatoes, the film has an approval rating of 94% based on 49 reviews, with a weighted average of 8.28/10. The site's consensus reads: "Well worth watching for film buffs and anyone who believes in following your dreams, American Movie is a warm, funny, and engrossing ode to creative passion". Metacritic, which uses a weighted average, assigned the film a score of 84 out of 100, based on 29 critics, indicating "universal acclaim".

Janet Maslin of The New York Times wrote that the film conveys Borchardt's passion "Insightfully and stirringly, not to mention hilariously", and that "for anyone wondering where the spirit of maverick independent filmmaking has its source, you need look no further". Roger Ebert gave the film four out of four possible stars, calling it "a very funny, sometimes very sad documentary".

Amy Goodman of IndieWire called the film "an inspiration for filmmakers everywhere", and Kevin Thomas of the Los Angeles Times wrote that it "is sure to draw lots of laughs". Glenn Lovell of Variety called the film an "ambitious, wildly funny chronicle" and a "madcap tribute to a beer-guzzling Midwestern filmmaker".

=== Awards ===
The film was awarded the Grand Jury Prize for Documentary at the 1999 Sundance Film Festival. The International Documentary Association named it as one of the top twenty documentaries of all time in 2002. In 2004, it was named by The New York Times as one of the "1,000 Greatest Movies Ever Made".

== Home media ==
American Movie was released on DVD by Sony Pictures Home Entertainment on May 23, 2000, as a "Special Edition" including deleted scenes, Coven itself, and a commentary track by Chris Smith, Sarah Price, Borchardt, and Schank. It was also released on VHS on January 16, 2001. After being out of print for years, it was released on Blu-ray on October 18, 2022. It was released on 4K Ultra HD Blu Ray on October 15, 2024.

== Notes ==
Awards
Preceded by The Farm tied with Frat House	Sundance Grand Jury Prize: Documentary; 1999	Succeeded by Long Night's Journey Into Day
