= Songs in the Key of Gold =

Remix album by Leslie Hall
- Released: December 14, 2013
- Recorded: 2004–2013
- Length: 56:39
- Label: Hefty Hideaway
- Producers: Leslie Hall; Titus Jones

Leslie Hall chronology
Destination Friendship (2011)	Songs in the Key of Gold (2013)

Singles from Songs in the Key of Gold
- 1. "No Pants Policy" Released: November 12, 2013

Songs in the Key of Gold is the first remix album and fifth overall by American recording artist Leslie Hall, released on December 14, 2013, via Hefty Hideaway. The album features dance remixes of Hall's songs by Titus Jones. It features songs from each of Hall's previous albums: Gold Pants, Door Man's Daughter, ceWEBrity, Back 2 Back Palz, and Destination Friendship. It also contains four new songs: "Neon Blood", "#1 Cat in America", "Happy Birthday", and "Of Course You Wear Glasses". To promote the album, Leslie Hall embarked on a nationwide tour that lasted from January to March 2014.

== Background ==
Prior to Songs in the Key of Gold, Leslie Hall created all of her music in GarageBand. Leslie Hall said in an interview that her music "always thought they lacked that oomph. I’m always trying to sound like the classics, like Britney and Rihanna, and they never had that." For the album's production, she enlisted Titus Jones, who she discovered after he mashed up one of her songs with Britney Spears and Rihanna's music.

== Critical reception ==
Lisa Dip of Web Wombat gave the album a highly positive review, calling the album "gloriously shameless, endlessly catchy and highly original- the way pop music should be." She noted "Tight Pants/Body Rolls," "Shazam I'm Glamorous," "Shake Your Hips," and "#1 Cat in America" as highlights from the album. She additionally praised producer Titus Jones for adding "seamlessness and energy in the album." Laura Fontaine Haines of Bust Magazine praised the production, writing that the songs got either a "serious kick up (“Power Cuddle”)" or "just a fabulous makeover (“Blame The Booty”)."

== Promotion ==
=== Singles and new songs ===
- "No Pants Policy" was released as the album's lead single on November 12, 2013. Its music video has reached over 1 million views, making it one of her most successful singles to date.
- "Neon Blood", "#1 Cat in America", "Happy Birthday", and "Of Course Your Wear Glasses" were all new songs recorded specifically for Songs in the Key of Gold.

=== Tour dates ===
Leslie and the LY's embarked on a tour in 2014 to promote Songs in the Key of Gold. The tour ran from January 12, 2014, to March 21, 2014.

- 1/12 San Francisco, CA – Rickshaw Stop
- 2/5 Kansas City, MO – The Riot Room
- 2/6 St Louis, MO – Plush Saint Louis
- 2/7 Chicago, IL – The Empty Bottle
- 2/8 Grand Rapids, MI – The Pyramid Scheme
- 2/9 Madison, WI – High Noon Saloon
- 2/10 Pontiac, MI – The Crofoot (The Pike Room)
- 2/11 Columbus, OH – TBA
- 2/13 Cambridge, MA – Middle East Restaurant and Nightclub
- 2/14 Providence, RI – AS220
- 2/15 Brooklyn, NY – Knitting Factory Brooklyn
- 2/16 Philadelphia, PA – Johnny Brenda's
- 2/17 Washington, DC – DC9 Nightclub
- 2/19 Chapel Hill, NC – Local 506
- 2/20 Charlotte, NC – TBA
- 2/21 Atlanta, GA – The EARL
- 2/22 Birmingham, AL – Bottletree Cafe
- 2/23 Nashville, TN – 12th & Porter
- 2/24 New Orleans, LA – TBA
- 2/25 Houston, TX – Fitzgerald's Houston
- 2/26 Dallas, TX – Club Dada
- 2/27 Austin, TX – Red 7
- 3/1 Tucson, AZ – Club Congress
- 3/2 Las Vegas, NV – TBA
- 3/3 San Diego, CA – Soda Bar
- 3/4 Los Angeles, CA – The Satellite
- 3/7 Seattle, WA – The Vera Project
- 3/8 Portland, OR – Branx Blow Pony
- 3/10 Salt Lake City, UT – Urban Lounge
- 3/12 Denver, CO – Hi-Dive Denver
- 3/13 Omaha, NE – The Waiting Room Lounge
- 3/14 Minneapolis, MN – Triple Rock Social Club
- 3/15 Des Moines, IA – Wooly's
- 3/21 Iowa City, IA – Blue Moose Tap House

== Track listing ==
All tracks are written by Leslie Hall, all remixed by Titus Jones.

No.	Title	Length
1.	"Gold Pants" (from the album Gold Pants)	2:51
2.	"Blame the Booty" (from the album ceWEBrity)	3:52
3.	"Tight Pants / Body Rolls" (from the album Back 2 Back Palz)	3:16
4.	"Neon Blood"	3:38
5.	"Shazam I'm Glamorous" (from the album Door Man's Daughter)	3:17
6.	"Craft Talk" (from the album Back 2 Back Palz)	3:32
7.	"How We Go Out" (from the album ceWEBrity)	3:26
8.	"No Pants Policy" (from the album Destination Friendship)	3:25
9.	"#1 Cat in America"	2:59
10.	"Hydrate Jirate" (from the album Destination Friendship)	3:51
11.	"Happy Birthday"	0:39
12.	"You're Not Taken?" (from the album Destination Friendship)	2:52
13.	"Power Cuddle" (from the album Destination Friendship)	2:54
14.	"Gem Sweater" (from the album Gold Pants)	3:22
15.	"Shake Your Hips" (from the album Door Man's Daughter)	2:17
16.	"Zombie Killer" (from the album Door Man's Daughter and ceWEBrity)	3:41
17.	"Of Course You Wear Glasses"	3:32
18.	"Gem Sweater Lullaby" (from the album Door Man's Daughter)	3:15
Total length:		56:39

== Release history ==
Region	Release date	Format	Label
United States	December 14, 2013	Digital Download	Hefty Hideaway
United States	December 14, 2013	CD	Hefty Hideaway
United States	December 14, 2013	Vinyl	Hefty Hideaway
