= Ding ding =

In English, ding ding is an onomatopoeia word referring to the sound of a ringing bell

Ding ding may also refer to:

== People ==
- Sa Dingding (born 1983), Chinese folk singer
- Ding Ding (tennis) (born 1977), female Chinese tennis player

== Music ==
- "Ring A Ding-Ding" (Leslie and the LY's song), a song by American group Leslie and the LY's from the 2004 album Gold Pants
- Ring-a-Ding-Ding!, 1961 album by Frank Sinatra
- "Ring-dinge-ding", 1967 Netherlands entry in the Eurovision Song Contest
- "Ring a Ding Ding", a 2005 single by Brakes
- "Ring Ding Ding", 2006 single by Pondlife (see Crazy Frog)

== Other ==
- Ding Ding Tong, traditional Hong Kong confectionery
- Ding-ding, and away, a type of railway accident
- Hong Kong Tramways, which is nicknamed "Ding Ding" because of the sound of its bell
- A character from the Hong Kong television series Forensic Heroes II

== See also ==
- Ding Dang (disambiguation)
- Ding Dong (disambiguation)
- "My Ding-a-Ling", novelty song
