= Blame the Booty =

2008 song by Leslie Hall

Song by Leslie Hall
- Recorded: 2008
- Genre: Pop
- Length: 3:30 [original] 3:07 [acoustic] 3:17 [NSL Bottom Heavy Remix] 3:52 [Titus Jones Remix]
- Label: Hefty Hideaway Inc.
- Songwriter: Leslie Hall
- Producer: Leslie Hall

"Blame the Booty" is a song recorded by American rapper Leslie Hall in 2008. It originally appeared on her second studio album, ceWEBrity, and received a music video, which was first uploaded to YouTube on August 24, 2009. "Blame the Booty" has appeared on four of Hall's five albums, and has had two remixes commissioned for the track.

== Album appearances ==
- ceWEBrity (2008) [Original version]
- Back 2 Back Palz (2010) [Acoustic version]
- Destination Friendship (2011) [Titus Jones Remix, single]
- Songs in the Key of Gold (2013) [Titus Jones Remix]

== Live performances ==
Leslie Hall has performed the song on most of her tours since the song's release in 2008. She performed the NSL Bottom Heavy Remix until 2012, when she started performing the Titus Jones Remix instead.

== NSL Bottom Heavy Remix ==
DJ Ninja Science Labartatories remixed the song in 2009. The remix was released on October 8, 2009 as a promotional single; the music video for the track was released on August 24, 2009. The video has received over 557,000 views on YouTube as of April 2017.

== Titus Jones Remix ==
"Blame the Booty (Titus Jones Remix)"

Single by Leslie Hall

from the album Destination Friendship
- B-side: "Tight Pants/Body Rolls (Utopia Park Remix)"
- Released: December 1, 2011
- Genre: Pop
- Length: 7:26
- Label: Maximus Ames Records
- Songwriter: Leslie Hall
- Producer: Titus Jones

Leslie Hall singles chronology
"Hydrate Jirate" (2011)	"Blame the Booty (Titus Jones Remix)" (2011)	"You're Not Taken?" (2012)

DJ Titus Jones remixed the track in 2011, and was ultimately released in 7" vinyl format December 1, 2011, as the second single from her fourth studio album, Destination Friendship. It would later appear on her sixth album, Songs in the Key of Gold.

=== Composition ===
The Titus Jones remix is a pop remix that contains influences of electro and house music. The song's tempo is sped up to a faster tempo of 126 beats per minute. The song is still in the key of C minor.

=== Release ===
"Blame the Booty" was released as a 7" vinyl on December 1, 2011 as the second single from her fifth studio album, Destination Friendship (2011). The B-side of the vinyl is a remix of her viral hit, "Tight Pants/Body Rolls."

=== Live performances ===
In 2008, Hall performed the song on NPR. Following the release of the single, Hall would perform the song at her live shows.

=== Track listing ===
All tracks are written by Leslie Hall

No.	Title	Length
1.	"Blame the Booty" (Titus Jones Remix)	3:53
2.	"Tight Pants/Body Rolls" (Utopia Park Remix)	3:33
Total length:		7:26

== Release history ==
Region	Release date	Format	Ref.
Various	December 1, 2011	7" Vinyl	
