= Kiss in the Dark =

Kiss in the Dark may refer to:

- A Kiss in the Dark (1925 film), a 1925 American comedy silent film
- A Kiss in the Dark (1949 film), a 1949 comedy film
- Kiss in the Dark (album), a 1979 album by Pink Lady
- Kiss in the Dark (K.I.D.), a pop duo from Zürich, Switzerland
- "Kiss in the Dark" (Pink Lady song), 1979
- Kiss in the Dark (Neon & Nude song), 2015
- Kiss in the Dark (novel), a novel series by Ken Nanbara
