= Ding Dong (disambiguation) =

Ding Dong is a chocolate snack cake marketed under the Hostess brand name.

Ding dong is an onomatopoeia for the sound that a standard doorbell makes.

Ding Dong or Dingdong may also refer to:

== Music ==
=== Groups ===
- The Ding Dongs, the group name under which "Early in the Morning" was originally released

=== Albums ===
- Ding Dong!, a 2013 album by Krista Siegfrids
- Ding Dong, a 1976 jazz album by Vic Dickenson
- Ding Dong, a 1996 album by Joe Nina
- Ding Dong, a 2000 album by Lester Young
- Ding Dong, a 2000 album by Jeans Team

=== Songs ===
- "Ding-Dong! The Witch Is Dead", a 1939 song from the film The Wizard of Oz
- "Ding Dong" (Freddie Bell And The Bellboys song) 1953 song, also "Giddy Up a Ding Dong" 1956
- "Ding Dong" (Dana International song), which represented Israel in the Eurovision Song Contest 2011 in Germany
- "Ding Dong", a 1996 song by Joe Nina from album of the same name
- "Ding Dong", a 2011 song by Robbie Rivera featuring Sue Cho
- "Ding Dong", a song by Irving Berlin
- "Ding Song", a song by Vandemataram Srinivas, Sonu Nigam and Timmy from the 2001 Indian film Ammayi Kosam
- "Ding Song", a song by Santhosh Narayanan, Arunraja Kamaraj and Mose from the 2014 Indian film Jigarthanda
- "Ding Dong!", a song by American drag queen Katya from her debut EP Vampire Fitness
- "Ding Dong, Ding Dong", a 1974 song by George Harrison
- "Ding Dong Merrily on High", a 1924 Christmas carol
- "Ding-a-dong", the winning song in the Eurovision Song Contest 1975 sung by Teach-In, representing the Netherlands
- "Ding Dong Song", a 2004 song by Swedish pop singer Günther, featuring The Sunshine Girls
- "Jaja Ding Dong", a track song in the 2020 film Eurovision Song Contest: The Story of Fire Saga

== People ==
- Ding Dong (reggae musician) (born 1980), dancehall performer from Jamaica
- Denise Drysdale (born 1948), Australian television personality affectionately known as "Ding Dong"
- Dingdong Dantes (born 1980), Filipino actor
- Dingdong Avanzado (born 1968), Filipino singer

== Places ==
- Ding Dong, Texas, an unincorporated community in the United States
- Ding Dong mines, in Cornwall

== Other uses ==
- "Ding Dong" (Brooklyn Nine-Nine), the seventh episode of the seventh season of American sitcom Brooklyn Nine-Nine
- Sir Dudley Ding Dong, a title character of Winston Steinburger and Sir Dudley Ding Dong, an Australian-Canadian animated children's television series
- The Ding Dongs, a masked professional wrestling tag team played by Greg Evans and Richard Sartain, formerly The Rock n Roll Rebels

== See also ==
- Din Dong, a fictional character
- Ding Dang (disambiguation)
- Đồng Đăng, a town in Vietnam
- Ding ding (disambiguation)
- Dong Ding tea
