= No Pants Policy =

Single by Leslie Hall

from the album Songs in the Key of Gold
- Released: November 12, 2013
- Genre: Dance; comedy
- Length: 3:25
- Label: Hefty Hideaway, Inc.
- Songwriter: Leslie Hall
- Producer: Titus Jones

Leslie Hall singles chronology
"You're Not Taken?" (2011)	"No Pants Policy" (2013)

"No Pants Policy" is a song recorded by American rapper Leslie Hall, that appears on her fourth studio album Destination Friendship (2011) and remix album Songs in the Key of Gold (2013). The song was remixed by Titus Jones as released on November 12, 2013 as the lead single from her remix album, Songs in the Key of Gold (2013). It is additionally Hall's first single to not be released as a 7" vinyl.

== Composition ==
"No Pants Policy" is a dance/comedy song with a length of three minutes and twenty five seconds. It moves at a tempo of 141 beats per minute. The song lyrically talks about not wearing pants while on the dance floor, and features EDM synthesizers, a dubstep bass, vocoders, and an electronic drum machine. The song was remixed by Titus Jones for her fifth studio album.

== Critical reception ==
Drew Bulman of Little Village Magazine called the song "far punchier than any of Hall's previous recordings."

== Music video ==
The music video was released on November 7, 2013. It has amassed over one million views as of 2017, making it one of her highest-viewed music videos to date. It depicts subjects in a test room watching a video of Hall on the screen and dancing to the song.

== Track listing ==
Digital download

No.	Title	Length
1.	"No Pants Policy"	3:25

== Release history ==
Region	Release date	Format	Ref.
Various	November 12, 2013	Digital download	
