= Ring A Ding-Ding (Leslie and the LY's song) =

Song by Leslie and the LY's

from the album Gold Pants
- Released: November 23, 2004
- Recorded: 2004
- Genre: Electroclash
- Length: 2:23
- Label: Hefty Hideaway
- Songwriter: Leslie Hall
- Producer: Leslie Hall

"Ring A Ding-Ding" is a song recorded by American pop music group Leslie and the LY's for their debut studio album, Gold Pants. Serving as the album's opening track, the track was premiered on November 23, 2004, on Unscrewed with Martin Sargent. It was also supplemented with its own music video.

== Composition ==
"Ring A Ding-Ding" is an electroclash song. It has a length of two minutes and twenty-three seconds and a tempo of 120 beats per minute. Leslie Hall provides lead vocals, rapping in the opening of the song, and sings for the rest. Hall's vocals span from C_{4} to D#_{5}.

Hall opens the track with the lyrics: "Ring A Ding-Ding, who's got that thing?" An electronic drum beat then begins, followed by an electronic rock bass. The track has minimal production.

== Music video and live performance ==
"Ring A Ding-Ding" was supplemented with a music video. It consists of the group performing in the middle of a party, as well of scenes of Hall and the other LY's in a separate room.

The group performed the track during their appearance on Unscrewed! with Martin Seargent.

== Release history ==
Release date	Released	Format
2005	United States	Digital download
