= Gold Pants (song) =

Single by Leslie and the LY's

from the album Gold Pants
- Released: May 15, 2005
- Recorded: 2004
- Genre: Hip hop; electronic; electro
- Length: 1:33
- Label: Hefty Hideaway
- Songwriter: Leslie Hall
- Producer: Leslie Hall

Leslie and the LY's singles chronology
"Gem Sweater" (2005)	"Gold Pants" (2005)

"Gold Pants" is a song recorded by Leslie and the LY's appearing their debut studio album of the same name. Serving as the album's titular track, it was released on May 15, 2005 as the album's second and final single through digital download, as well as a 7" vinyl EP. The track was written by front woman Leslie Hall, who also produced the track. A longer remix of the song appears on the album Songs in the Key of Gold.

== Composition ==
"Gold Pants" is a hip hop and electronic, and electro song with additional influences of R&B and house. Written by Leslie Hall, it is in the key of C minor, moving at a tempo of 120 beats per minute. Like the rest of the album, it was composed using Garageband.

The track begins with an R&B string segment, before breaking into a house beat with electronic and hip hop synthesizers. Leslie Hall raps during the verses, while singing during the chorus. Her vocals range from A#_{3}-G_{4}. The song's lyrics are about gold pants, as the main hook's lyrics show: "Thank you mama for making me gold pants/Ones I can dance in, and make romance in."

== Music video ==
"Gold Pants" has been supplemented with a music video. It consists of Leslie Hall and the other members of the group performing the track in a booth.

== Live performances ==
Leslie and the LY's have performed "Gold Pants" on all of their tours, typically being the show's opener.

== Release history ==
Release date	Released	Format	Ref.
2005	United States	7" vinyl	
2005	United States	Digital download	
