= Randy Constan =

American Peter Pan impersonator (b. 1953)

- Born: November 18, 1953 (age 72); Staten Island, New York, U.S.
- Known for: Peter Pan impersonator
- Website: pixyland.org/peterpan/

Randy Constan (born November 18, 1953) is a Peter Pan impersonator who first posted his cosplay pictures on a website in 2001, in what he stated was an attempt to find a girlfriend. The website became a widely circulated internet meme, and in 2001 Constan's website, "pixyland.org" (aka "Peter Pan's Home Page") won a Webby Award in the "weird" category. Constan currently resides in Tampa, Florida.

Constan has made television appearances in costume, including Late Night with Conan O'Brien, Jimmy Kimmel Live!, Unscrewed with Martin Sargent, and Because I Said So.

In 2006, Constan appeared in a music video alongside Jay Maynard, Leslie Hall, and other individuals who gained worldwide exposure via the Internet, created for the web site WeAreTheWeb.org. The video advocates for net neutrality.

== Personal life ==
Constan grew up in Staten Island, New York. He graduated from Staten Island College in 1974 with an Associate of Applied Science in Electronics and worked for Consolidated Edison in New York City from 1974 through 1994. His first marriage was in 1976, during which he lived on Long Island. He later moved to Tampa, Florida where he has worked for Tasnet Inc. since 1995.

On October 7, 2007, Constan became engaged to his girlfriend of one year (who goes by the names Tinkerbell and Princess Dorothy) at a local club called "The Castle"; the couple married March 29, 2009 at the Bay Area Renaissance Fair.
