= Remute =

German musician

Denis Karimani (born 1983 in Belgrad), using the stage name Remute, is a techno musician and DJ from Hamburg, Germany. He started his eponymous record label in 2008.

His self titled debut album Remute was released by Hamburg record label Ladomat 2000 in 2006 followed by further releases on record labels like Tresor, remixes for artists like GusGus, and live performances in clubs like Berghain. Remute is especially known for releasing his music on uncommon formats. His album Limited was released in 2017 on a 7-inch vinyl and 3 1/2 inch floppy disk. This album received a huge media response and put the floppy disk back on the map as a format for music. Remute's album Technoptimistic, released in 2019, is the first ever techno music album that got released on a Sega-Mega-Drive cartridge.

In March 2020 Remute released the first music album on a Super NES cartridge - The Cult Of Remute.

In February 2021, Remute joined the vintage magazine Scene World Magazine as a PR assistant, in order to focus on their social media presence and public awareness.

In March 2021 Remute released, Electronic Lifestyle, the first music album on a HuCard for the PC Engine and TurboGrafx16 gameconsoles shortly followed by Living Electronics in September 2021, an album for the Game Boy.

During an interview with RetroRGB on 27 December 2021 Remute announced the first music album on a Nintendo 64 cartridge called R64 and scheduled for a release in March 2022. In January 2022 Remute confirmed shipments will begin March 25, 2022. Alongside that confirmation was the announcement of a Plus Edition of R64 that will include "a 7" vinyl with hi-res versions of several songs from the album."
