= Scene World Magazine =

Commodore 64 magazine

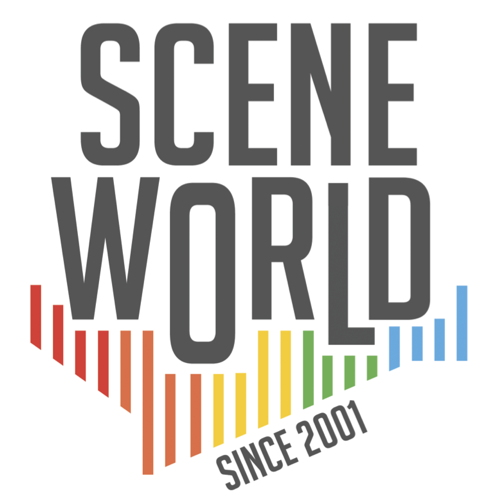
Scene World Magazine

Scene World Magazine (abbreviated SWO) is a disk magazine for the Commodore 64 home computer. The magazine has been released regularly since February 2001.

== History ==
Scene World was founded in November 2000 by several Commodore scene personalities under the organization of Joerg "Nafcom" Droege. The initial magazine presentation system was programmed by Robin Harbron, who would later find success as one of the developers of the C64 Direct-to-TV game device. Harbron stopped actively supporting the magazine in 2001; the presentation system has since been documented, modified, and updated by various editors and staff members.

Throughout Scene World's history, it has attempted to style itself as both an NTSC (North America, Japan, and South Korea) and PAL (Europe, Oceania, and the Middle East) production, allowing it to court talent and reach audiences in largely disparate computer cultures. Scene World has also been one of the few disk magazines to actively seek individuals that do not fit into the specific software cracking or demo scene subcultures that most other disk magazines focus on. As a result, it has been able to conduct interviews with numerous non-Commodore-related computer industry pioneers.

Additionally, Scene World partnered with fellow disk magazine Loadstar (ISSN 0886-4144) in 2003 for a "Wild West" cross-promotion.

Scene World currently utilizes an all-volunteer editorial staff of 20, and produces two issues of the disk magazine per year, generally in summer and winter, with video interviews scheduled to coincide with the disk magazine releases. Podcasts and video reviews are released on a semi-monthly basis, and do not follow the release schedule of the magazine.

== Magazine content ==
Issues of the magazine are delivered as downloadable disk image files for use in emulators or on actual Commodore hardware. Additionally, issues can be viewed online, via an embedded version of the VICE emulator. Text of the magazine is provided via presentation software. This software allows users to select and read articles and scroll through text, while also allowing them to change text and background color, switch between fonts, alternate between logos, and select either music or silence. Uniquely, support for the Commodore 1351 computer mouse is a feature of the presenter system; during initial planning, Droege felt that American users would be more inclined to view the magazine if it resembled Berkeley Softworks' GEOS operating environment.

The text of the magazine is divided into articles or chapters, and covers topics ranging from news and updates, interviews (text-only or transcribed from video interviews), opinion and editorial content, demo party reports, and release charts.

In addition to Commodore-specific files, a PDF floppy disk sleeve image is also included with each issue. These "diskcovers" can be printed to create protective sleeves for people using physical floppy disks.

== Further endeavors ==
In 2012, Droege expanded Scene World's non-disk magazine activities to focus on video-based interviews, initially with Michael Tomczyk and John Draper, and later with other technology pioneers such as Martin Cooper, Jeroen Tel, Bil Herd, Chuck Peddle, Yash Terakura, Walter Day, James Bach, Alexey Pajitnov, Stewart Cheifet, Chris Huelsbeck, Jeri Ellsworth, and Ralph H. Baer. Baer's interview, in particular, garnered significant attention, it being the final—and longest—interview he gave prior to his death in December 2014.

In July 2014, Scene World again expanded with an audio podcast, hosted by associate editor AJ Heller (with Droege as co-host), to focus primarily on technology personalities and newsmakers that are currently active and promoting products or services. Guests to date have included Tarnkappe.info's Lars Sobiraj; Frederik Schreiber and Mike Nielsen of 3D Realms; Matt Falcus and Sven Vößing of Cinemaware; SiREN and Esper from Ubisoft's Frag Dolls professional gaming team; game music pioneers David Lowe and Rob Hubbard; Super Mario voice actor Charles Martinet; Vanessa Arteaga; David Fox; Ron Gilbert; Dan Wood; and Jay Maynard, a cosplayer famous for his "Tron"-based costume, known as the Tron Guy.

In June 2015, Droege further expanded Scene World's online presence with a channel on the streaming platform Twitch. This channel currently hosts live interviews, conducted by the staff, and aims to create original programming, as well as stream the staff's participation in live and charity events.

Since August 2015, Scene World has been a part of the retro area at the video game trade fair Gamescom, running a booth in tandem with retro game music group "Hans Hiscore". Visitors to the booth can interact with the staff and read the magazine live on a real Commodore 64, as well as play music on Atari and C64 home computers with Hans Hiscore.

In December 2015, Scene World's YouTube channel began hosting video reviews of new Commodore 64 hardware and software, beginning with a review of a new C64 Wi-Fi adapter, designed by Leif Bloomquist, which gained some coverage in both international and German press.

In July 2018, Droege also spoke about the magazine's involvement in video game preservation in an interview - surrounding the C64 Mini and other retro gamig topics - conducted by the gaming scorekeeping institution Twin Galaxies.

In August 2018, Scene World released its first Amiga issue of Scene World #28.

In November 2018, the Internet Archive added a collection page for the Scene World Podcast to preserve its episodes.

In December 2018, Scene World decided to release all video interviews with technology pioneers also as audio versions to make it possible to listen to each interviews rather than watching it on YouTube. For this, a Scene World Tech Interviews RSS feed in podcast format has been created with each interview listed on a dedicated webpage. To help preservation, all interviews are on a dedicated collection page at the Internet Archive as well.

In February 2021, in order to focus on better social media presence and public awareness, the musician and DJ Remute has joined Scene World as PR Assistant.

== In popular culture ==
Scene World has received media attention on several occasions. In March, 2001, Droege was interviewed by the German Radio channel Bayern 3 of Bayerischer Rundfunk. In October 2005, Droege was interviewed in the German magazine Lotek64 and in 2013 in German magazine LOAD #2.

On November 11, 2016, Droege was interviewed about the topic of retro gaming as part of a news item in the ZDF news program Heute. On December, 8th 2016, the same news item - containing different quotes from participating interviewees - was aired as part of ZDF's Breakfast television program.

In 2015, Droege was recognized for his work on Scene World with a trading card (#2296) in The Walter Day Collection.

Excerpts of The Scene World Podcast featuring Heller, David Lowe, and Holly Jazz Lowe were featured in the documentary Uncle Art: The Film in late 2018.

A scientific approach of the floppy disk and what Scene World offers to the storage media, has been taken in an interview with Heller and Droege by a group of Dutch researchers for the book Floppy Disk Fever which went on pre-order in July 2022 and is due to release in September 2022.

== Charity and fundraising ==
Following the podcast with UbiSoft's Frag Dolls professional gaming team, Scene World staff members Droege and Heller committed to participating in the Extra Life (fundraiser) charity organization. The two raised money for the Illuminate team (former Frag Dolls team) in 2015 and currently participate with their own team, "Scene World," since 2016.

In August 2016, Scene World also committed to participate in fundraising for The AbleGamers Foundation as Team Scene World.

In May 2017, Scene World helped the Swiss computer museum Musée Bolo by creating awareness about their fundraising to reach beyond the French Swiss community in order to ensure the museum's future existence. .

== See also ==
- Commodore 64
- Disk magazine
- List of disk magazines
