= Jay Maynard =

American internet celebrity

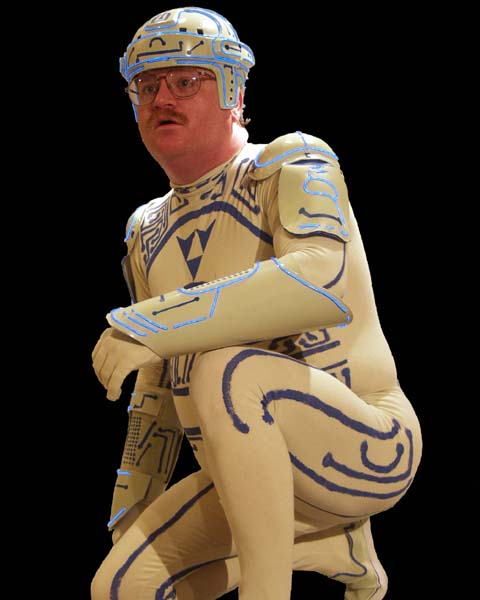
- Born: July 27, 1960 (age 66); United States
- Other name: Tron Guy
- Occupations: Computer programmer, system administrator, project maintainer
- Call sign: K5ZC

Jay Maynard (born July 27, 1960) is an American computer programmer, system administrator and the volunteer project maintainer for Hercules, a free emulator of IBM mainframe hardware. He is known for his self-made electroluminescent costume based on the film Tron, which resulted in his nickname Tron Guy.

== Internet fame ==
Maynard created a revealing electroluminescent costume, inspired by the film Tron, that he could wear at the science fiction convention Penguicon in 2004. He has said that he "hasn't missed a Penguicon, and doesn't intend to". He created a web page of photos of the costume, and of himself wearing it. His page of photos quickly gained a lot of attention on the Internet, after it was posted on Slashdot and Fark.

In 2006, Maynard appeared in a music video entitled "We Are the Web", for the website of the same name. The video advocates the concept of network neutrality. In it, Maynard appears alongside several other Internet celebrities, including Leslie Hall and Randy Constan. He was also parodied in the 2008 South Park episode "Canada on Strike". His likeness appeared alongside those of such other Internet celebrities as Gary Brolsma, Star Wars Kid, Chris Crocker, and Tay Zonday.

In 2010, Maynard was banned from seeing the film Tron: Legacy in his iconic Tron suit in his local movie theater because of the illuminating lights on his suit.

On June 8, 2011, Maynard appeared on America's Got Talent. He received a "no" vote from all of the three judges and did not make it past the audition round. Howie Mandel had him restart his introductory speech over several times, so it was left unclear what his act was going to be.

In 2011, Maynard appeared in Duck Products' "Stuck On Duck Video Project", a commercial for duct tape. The ad, made by Ryactive and produced by Tongal, recreates the light-cycle race from Tron using stop-motion animation, followed by Maynard's appearance in the Tron Guy outfit. The video was featured in Wired Magazine as a "genius idea" and like many of Maynard's previous videos went viral, becoming the tenth most viewed video of all time on Vimeo.

On August 26, 2015, Maynard was interviewed by the Scene World Podcast in a live video podcast, hosted by Olympronica for the Film & Games Interactions exhibit at the Deutsches Filminstitut in Frankfurt, Germany. The interview was presented live on Twitch, and later published as both a video interview on YouTube and audio podcast.

== See also ==
- List of Internet phenomena
