= DJKAM =

Swiss DJ

- Born: Kilian Albert Merz; Zurich, Switzerland
- Origin: Zurich, Switzerland
- Genres: EDM, house, tech house, progressive house, electro, dubstep
- Occupations: DJ, musician, record producer, songwriter, artist
- Years active: 1988–present
- Labels: KAMUSICRECORDS BIG TUNES RECORDS (Miami) LoudDJs Records (Miami) Plasmapool (Ger), Hooki-Sonic Recordings (San Francisco) and EML Recordings (UK)
- Website: djkamusic.com sternenton.com

Kilian Albert Merz, (KAM) better known as DJKAM is a Swiss electronic dance music (EDM) producer, dj and artist from Zürich, Switzerland. He had several chart successes mainly in Western Europe. KAM is also known as STERNENTON (chillout / downtempo / techno / techhouse), KAM-TON (ambient / meditation / soundscapes) and under his art project name KAMART (digital graphic art, crypto art, nft art) exposing his visual work in São Paulo, Brazil and Zug, Switzerland. He is founder and owner of the music label KAMUSICRECORDS.

== Career ==
Currently he is releasing his music on his own label KAMUSICRECORDS. Before he was signed to Big Tunes Records (Miami). formerly LoudDJs Records (Miami). and Hooki-Sonic Recordings (San Francisco). He earlier released several tracks on Plasmapool (Ger) and EML Recordings (UK). After living and working for over two years in São Paulo, Brazil, DJKAM returned to Zurich, Switzerland in 2015. His latest collaborations with other artists include Hip Hop / RnB tracks with U.S. rapper BLVACK DAVINCI released 2018 and 2019, "Better Without You" House, RnB in 2015 with U.S. artist and singer IESHIA. Two tracks "Drift Away" and "Everything" house released in 2014 with former Coco Star.

In the late 1980s and early 1990s he had chart successes with tracks like "The Phonecall" and "Backfield in Motion" mainly in Western Europe. He signed 1988 worldwide with Phonogram Records GmbH (Mercury Records) in Germany as co-founder, member and co-producer of the Pop band "Kiss in the Dark (K.I.D.)". Most of K.I.D.'s music was recorded and produced at Sigma Sound Studios in New York, working with engineer/producer and Grammy Awards winner Tony Maserati.
