= Jim Herd =

American television and professional wrestling executive (1932–2026)

1st Executive Vice President of World Championship Wrestling
- In office 1988–1992
- Preceded by: Office established
- Succeeded by: Kip Frey

15th President of National Wrestling Alliance
- In office 1991–1992
- Preceded by: Jim Crockett, Jr.
- Succeeded by: Seiji Sakaguchi

Personal details
- Born: James Herd; August 13, 1932
- Died: October 2026 (aged 94)

James Herd (August 13, 1932 – October 2026) was an American television production executive and professional wrestling executive. He served as the Executive Vice President of World Championship Wrestling (WCW) from 1988 to 1992, following Turner Broadcasting's acquisition of Jim Crockett Promotions.

== Business career ==
Herd held positions in the broadcasting and food service sectors. He served as a station manager for KPLR-TV in St. Louis, Missouri, a channel that aired the then-popular wrestling program Wrestling at the Chase. Herd worked as a producer for the program. Subsequently, he worked as a regional manager for Pizza Hut, where he was credited with notably increasing sales after conducting phone surveys and responding to customer feedback.

=== World Championship Wrestling (1988–1992) ===
==== Inauguration and initiatives ====
Herd would later state in an interview that he and Ted Turner had a relationship that went back long before 1988, and after the acquisition of Jim Crockett Promotions by Turner Broadcasting, the media mogul wanted him to run the new wrestling division. In late 1988, Herd was appointed the inaugural Executive Vice President of WCW, with his official tenure commencing on January 3, 1989. TBS Vice President of Programming Jeff Carr evaluated the successful programming of the World Wrestling Federation (WWF) and determined that the NWA needed to have more interviews, less violence, and to move their programming into arenas.

He set about enacting these points, and one of his first initiatives was to model the success of the World Wrestling Federation (WWF), which embraced a positive, family-friendly image. This was achieved by introducing various gimmicks and characters with the intention of broadening WCW's appeal, especially to the younger demographic. One such initiative was the creation of "The Ding Dongs," a tag team portrayed by The Rock 'n' Roll Rebels, donning an all-red outfit with a visual representation of a bell. This gimmick did not resonate with many fans and critics and was quickly scrapped. Another was The Dynamic Dudes, which saw Shane Douglas and Johnny Ace paired together in an attempt to appeal to youth surfing and roller skating audiences. Another reported concept was "The Hunchbacks," a tag team idea where the wrestlers' physical characteristics (the hump) would ostensibly prevent them from being pinned. Herd later stated that the idea was suggested as a joke.

Herd also set about modernising the look of NWA programming, particularly the promotion's flagship Saturday TBS show World Championship Wrestling. The program was moved out of the studios of WPCQ-TV (Charlotte, NC) and into the larger, better-lit Centre Stage in Atlanta, Georgia. The NWA's PPV events were also improved with ramps and pyro introduced. In the fall of 1989, the promotion also began using popular songs as entrance themes, including "Welcome to the Jungle" (Steiner Brothers), "Rocket" (Brian Pillman), "Wipeout" (the Dynamic Dudes), as well as Danny Elfman's theme for Batman (Tom Zenk). Herd also sought to aggressively counterprogram the World Wrestling Federation, a move that the rival company had previously done in 1987 with the inaugural Survivor Series and again in January 1988 with the Royal Rumble. The NWA WrestleWar '89 PPV was originally scheduled to run opposite of WrestleMania V, but Herd (and not Turner as was widely believed) ultimately moved the event back a month and instead placed the free Clash of Champions VI event in its place.

He was also known for his promotional partnerships, and signed The Oak Ridge Boys to perform the United States national anthem at the WrestleWar 89 PPV. He would later sign commercial agreements with Roos and Budweiser. In May 1990, under an edict from Turner Broadcasting, the promotion would have a tie in with the movie RoboCop 2. As part of this collaboration, Herd organised a dedicated Pay-Per-View event called Capital Combat, where RoboCop appeared alongside professional wrestler Sting. Later that year Herd signed Elvira to appear in commercials promoting the upcoming Halloween Havoc '90 PPV, and in the following year he brought The Wonder Years actor Jason Hervey to make several appearances with the company. Within the Turner organization there was interest in cross-promoting Turner-owned properties with WCW, and in the spring of 1991 he proposed taking the character of Oz from The Wizard of Oz film and turning him into a wrestler. The Oz character would later debut at SuperBrawl I in May, portrayed by Kevin Nash. Wrestler Brad Armstrong was given the gimmick of "The Candyman" in an attempt to lure Hershey into a partnership.

Much like Eric Bischoff would do years later, Herd also attempted to lure WWF talent away from the company. In March 1989 he negotiated with and almost signed Rowdy Roddy Piper, going so far as to get him to appear at an NWA event for a Sting vs Ric Flair match. The deal fell through, and Herd would later negotiate with Randy Savage who he stated was his biggest free agent interest. However, Herd had budgetary limits imposed upon him by WCW President Jack Petrick, and was not able to make as lucrative an offer as he could. Herd later said that he really regretted being unable to sign Savage, as he felt that this really would have helped with WCW's youth audience.

==== Conflicts and subsequent departure ====
Herd's tenure saw several internal conflicts, particularly with prominent wrestler Ric Flair. Disputes arose over proposed changes to Flair's wrestling persona and contractual disagreements. Herd reportedly suggested that Flair adopt a gladiator-inspired gimmick named Spartacus, which Flair and some within the company reportedly opposed. In a later interview, Herd would deny wanting Flair to cut his hair or change his name. Herd also wanted Flair to lose the WCW World Heavyweight Championship and reportedly take a pay cut. Flair balked at Herd's proposition. Herd would terminate Flair's contract and invalidate his status as the recognized holder of the WCW World Heavyweight Championship on July 1, 1991, however, Flair still retained possession of the physical championship belt, which he took with him upon exiting the company.

Herd resigned from his position as Executive Vice President on January 8, 1992.

== Death ==
Herd died in October 2026, at the age of 94. His death was announced on November 10.
