= Door Man's Daughter =

Studio album by Leslie Hall
- Released: October 5, 2006
- Recorded: 2005–06
- Genre: Electronic; pop; rock
- Length: 26:26
- Label: Hefty Hideaway
- Producer: Leslie Hall; Arecee

Leslie Hall chronology
Door Man's Daughter (2006)	Cewebrity (2008)

Singles from Door Man's Daughter
- 1. "Mother Gem Lullaby" Released: May 11, 2006; 2. "Willow Don't Cry" Released: March 22, 2007

Door Man's Daughter is the debut solo studio album by American recording artist Leslie Hall. It was released on October 5, 2006 through Hefty Hideaway. Door Man's Daughter serves as the follow-up to her previous album, Gold Pants (2005). The record had two official singles and was promoted by the release of several music videos, all of which can be found online. Hall made an appearance on MTV to promote the album.

== Composition ==
Musically, Door Man's Daughter is an electronic, pop, and rock album that explores musical styles such as dance music, electro music, house music, hip hop music, and electronica. Each of the 13 tracks are electronic-based, while exploring these other types of music.

== Promotion ==
=== Singles ===
- "Mother Gem Lullaby", which features Hall's brother Arecee, was released as the first music video on May 11, 2006. It has received over 800,000 views, and is currently the only official video from Door Man's Daughter on Hall's channel.
- "Willow Don't Cry" was released as the second music video on March 22, 2007. It had a music video released the same day, in which she collaborated with Dungeon Majesty.

=== Music videos ===
- "Zombie Killer" had a music video released on August 16, 2007. It would later reappear on Hall's third studio album ceWEBrity, where it was remixed with vocals from Cassandra Peterson. It was released as the album's lead single.
- "Beat Dazzler" was supplemented with a music video in summer 2006.
- Hall uploaded a fan video of "Shake Your Hips" on November 5, 2006.

== Track listing ==
All tracks are written by Leslie Hall, except for "Mother Gem Lullaby", which features additional writing from Arecee.

No.	Title	Length
1.	"Meet the Keeper" (Intro)	0:54
2.	"Strike Gold"	1:48
3.	"Zombie Killer"	2:45
4.	"Shazam I'm Glamorous"	2:22
5.	"Gem Sweater" (Revisited)	2:42
6.	"Can't Stop the Gems (Jams)"	2:21
7.	"Take Yo Picture"	3:05
8.	"Shake Your Hips"	1:30
9.	"Hard & Funky"	1:07
10.	"Beat-Dazzler"	1:44
11.	"Holla Back Ames"	0:39
12.	"Mother Gem Lullaby" (featuring Arecee)	2:14
13.	"Willow Don't Cry" (Secret Song)	3:15
Total length:		26:26

== Release history ==
Region	Release date	Format	Label
United States	October 5, 2006	Digital download	Hefty Hideaway, Inc.
United States	October 5, 2006	CD	Hefty Hideaway, Inc.
