= Ding Dang =

Ding Dang may refer to:

- Ding Dang (singer) (born 1982), Chinese singer
- "Ding Dang" (song), 1977 song by The Beach Boys
- Ding Dang (fictional character), character in Ode to Gallantry

== See also ==
- Ding Dong (disambiguation)
- Đồng Đăng, a border town in Vietnam
