= Neon & Nude =

American pop music duo

- Origin: Ames, Iowa, U.S.
- Genres: Comedy; pop
- Years active: 2012–present
- Label: Yarn House
- Members: Leslie Hall; Kate Kennedy

Neon & Nude is an American independent pop music duo that consists of satirical rapper Leslie Hall and singer Kate Kennedy. The group formed in 2012, after being members of American pop music group Leslie and the LY's. They released their debut studio album, Neon & Nude: Featuring the Feminine Gazes on May 4, 2017.

== Artistry ==
Neon & Nude represents a sonic departure from Hall's previous hip hop and dance-influenced music, and takes musical influence in comedy-pop. Their songs are lesbian love songs. Hall confirmed that she learned to play the piano for the project. The group is backed by a horn ensemble.

== Career ==
=== 2012-2017: Neon & Nude: Featuring the Feminine Gazes ===
Neon & Nude formed in 2012, and immediately began work on new music. In June 2012, they released demos for three of their songs: "Look in Love," "Kiss in the Dark," and "Never Trust Men." Hall and Kennedy then followed this up on July 27, 2013 with the music video for "Look in Love." The group briefly went on hiatus as Hall toured for her sixth studio album, Songs in the Key of Gold. After touring finished, the group released the single "Kiss in the Dark," which was accompanied with a music video. In January 2017, after two years, the duo released the music video for "I'll Try To Improve." After five years of recording, their debut studio album, Neon & Nude: Featuring the Feminine Gazes, was released on May 4, 2017. The band performed at the Maximum Ames Music Festival on September 24, 2017.

== Discography ==
=== Albums ===
- Neon & Nude: Featuring the Feminine Gazes (2017)

=== Singles ===
- "Kiss in the Dark" (2015)

=== Music videos ===
- "Look in Love" (2013)
- "Kiss in the Dark" (2015)
- "I'll Try To Improve" (2017)

=== Demos ===
- "Look in Love" (2012)
- "Kiss in the Dark" (2012)
- "Never Trust Men" (2012)
