= Rock 'n' Roll Rebels =

Professional wrestling tag team

Rock 'n Roll Rebels

Tag team
- Members: Greg Evans; Richard Sartain
- Name(s): The Rock 'n Roll Rebels; The Ding Dongs
- Billed from: Belleville, USA
- Debut: 1987
- Disbanded: August 26, 1989
- Years active: 1987–1989

The Rock 'n' Roll Rebels were a professional wrestling tag team consisting of Greg Evans and Richard Sartain. The duo began teaming in 1987, and after jumping to World Championship Wrestling in 1989 were recast as The Ding Dongs. Under this guise they would become far better known and achieve lasting notoriety, and are considered as having one of the worst wrestling gimmicks in history.

== History ==
=== Deep South Wrestling (1987–1988) ===
After working as an enhancement talent for the World Wrestling Federation, Greg Evans joined Jody Hamilton's Deep South Wrestling (DSW) promotion. It was there that he first teamed with Richard Sartain, forming the young duo of "The Rock 'n Roll Rebels". The name was derivative of several other "Rock n Roll" themed teams of the time, such as the Rock 'n' Roll Express, The Midnight Rockers, The Southern Rockers, and The Rock 'n' Roll RPMs. On May 1, 1987 they would face Bad Company (The Nightmare and Steve "The Brawler" Lawler) at Ware County Junior High in Waycross, Georgia. Evans and Surtain would go on to face multiple teams within the promotion over the next two years, and were described by Greg Oliver in the 2005 book "The Pro Wrestling Hall of Fame: The Tag-Teams" as having "clicked very well. They could have been in any territory." Deep South Wrestling would close in October 1988, leaving the Rebels in search for a new promotion.

=== World Championship Wrestling (1989) ===
"You know, it's funny. That was Jim Herd's idea. To show you how much this guy was in touch with the wrestling business, his idea was "Let's have a tag team with bells on their neck, bells on their ankle, and bells everywhere. And we'll have them come out with a big bell, and whenever one of them's getting beat up, the other will ring the bell and he'll get fired up. The kids will love it." Of course, when the Ding Dongs came out, this is how the kids felt about them [flips the bird]."

— Jim Cornette during a Q&A session at the 1998 Eddie Gilbert Tribute Dinner

In early 1989, new WCW Executive Vice President Jim Herd launched a creative initiative to compete with the more child friendly World Wrestling Federation. Perhaps inspired by the success that the Sheepherders had experienced in the WWF a few months earlier when they became the fun-loving Bushwhackers, Herd decided to create his own colorful team that would be geared towards children. To that effort he brought The Rock 'n Roll Rebels to World Championship Wrestling. However Sartain and Evans would not be recognizable, but would be clad in orange morph suits and covered with tiny bells.

Re-designated The Ding Dongs, Evans and Sartain made their debut on June 14, 1989 at the Clash of the Champions VII televised card which was held in Fort Bragg, NC. Although Herd was expecting a strong reaction for the duo, the fan response that night was not as planned as the crowd turned virulently against them. While each took turns ringing a giant bell at ringside while the other wrestled, the crowd booed and commentator Jim Ross was noticeably embarrassed. The Ding Dongs defeated the enhancement team of Cougar Jay and George South, leaving the ring scattered with small bells and Jim Ross relieved that the match was over.

Taken aback by the harsh reaction, the team's push was immediately cancelled by Jim Herd and booker Ric Flair. The gimmick had only served to alienate the company's blue collar fanbase. They immediately began a losing streak in house show matches with The New Zealand Militia (Rip Morgan and Jack Victory). Per an article in the New York Times, the team was rejected by the company's older fanbase. By the end of August the end had come for the tandem, for on the August 26th episode of WCW Worldwide they were squashed in 47 seconds by The Skyscrapers. Following the match Evans and Sartain were unmasked, and Norman the Lunatic (who was at ringside) put on one of the discarded masks. Both wrestlers would continue on briefly under their own names but would depart the promotion that fall.

=== Legacy ===
Although their prime run in WCW was short-lived, the Rock n Roll Rebels achieved lasting fame as participating in one of the worst gimmicks in wrestling history. In 1989, the Pro Wrestling Observer awarded them the title of "Worst Gimmick". The Ding Dongs are now consistently ranked among the most worst gimmicks of all time. Bill Apter's 1wrestling.com, however, has defended The Ding Dongs pointing out the team's appeal to younger wrestling fans. In 2011, The Bleacher Report ranked The Ding Dongs as the most horrible gimmick of all time. A year later Bleacher Report again listed The Ding Dongs number one, this time with the stupidest name in wrestling history. In 2016, The Sportster rated them the second worst tag-team of all-time.

Both men retired from wrestling in 1989.

== Championships and accomplishments ==
- Deep South Wrestling
  - DSW Tag Team Championship (2 times)
- Wrestling Observer Newsletter
  - Worst Gimmick (1989) as The Ding Dongs
