= Cewebrity =

ceWEBrity

Studio album by Leslie Hall
- Released: February 26, 2008
- Recorded: 2007
- Genres: Electronic dance; hip hop
- Length: 30:45
- Label: Hefty Hideaway
- Producer: Leslie Hall

Leslie Hall chronology
Door Man's Daughter (2006)	ceWEBrity (2008)	Back 2 Back Palz (2010)

Singles from ceWEBrity
- 1. "How We Go Out" Released: November 8, 2007; 2. "Zombie Killer (Remix)" Released: February 16, 2008

Cewebrity (stylized as ceWEBrity) is the second studio album by American recording artist Leslie Hall. It was released on February 26, 2008 via Hefty Hideaway. It serves as the follow-up to her second studio album, Door Man's Daughter. It was recorded in 2007, and was promoted from 2007 to 2009. Leslie embarked on a tour with her band Leslie and the LY's in 2009. During that time, it was supplemented by the single "Zombie Killer." CeWEBrity is known for its more pop-inspired sound compared to Hall's other music.

== Composition ==
CeWEBrity is a pop-inspired electronic dance and hip hop-inspired album that incorporates elements of electronic music, dance music, and electronica. It opens with the album's lead single "How We Go Out", a dance and hip hop song that incorporates elements of country. Many other songs on the album explore this dance-oriented musical style, including: "Drop a Gem", "Spider Eyes", "Spider Eyes" and "Real Gold and Glamorous". Aside from this dance theme, other songs on the album such as "Blame the Booty", "Test 10 Guys", and "Party Dip" are comedic rap songs with minimalistic electronica production. The second single from the album, "Zombie Killer" is a comedy song about fighting off a zombie apocalypse. "Keep It Real" explores comedic soft rock music.

== Promotion ==
=== Touring ===
Hall toured in the US to promote ceWEBrity, with the tour wrapping in summer of 2009. In addition to this, she performed at the Forward Music Fest 2008.

=== Singles ===
- "How We Go Out" was released as the lead single on November 8, 2007. The music video has reached over 2 million views, making it one of Hall's most successful songs to date.
- "Zombie Killer" was remixed and released as the lead single on February 16, 2008. This new version features Elvira, mistress of the dark.

=== Other songs ===
- "Blame the Booty" had a music video released on August 24, 2009.
- "Real Gold and Glamorous" was performed during Hall's set at the Forward Music Fest 2008. It was also performed on her setlist for the ceWEBrity tour.
- "Midwest Diva" has been performed on Leslie Hall's Back 2 Back Palz tour.
- A music video for "Drop a Gem" was filmed, but has not been released.

== Track listing ==
All tracks are written by Leslie Hall, except for "Zombie Killer", which features additional writing from Cassandra Peterson.

No.	Title	Length
1.	"How We Go Out"	3:42
2.	"Drop a Gem"	3:00
3.	"Blame the Booty"	3:31
4.	"Test 10 Guys"	2:33
5.	"Spider Eyes"	2:56
6.	"Keep It Real"	3:08
7.	"Zombie Killer" (featuring Elvira)	2:49
8.	"Midwest Diva"	3:18
9.	"Party Dip"	2:08
10.	"Real Gold and Glamorous"	3:40
11.	"The Beastmaster" (Discogs bonus track)	3:15
Total length:		30:45

== Release history ==
Region	Release date	Format	Ref.	Label
United States	February 26, 2008	Digital download		Hefty Hideaway, Inc.
United States	February 26, 2008	CD		Hefty Hideaway, Inc.
