= Kiss in the Dark (K.I.D.) =

Background information
- Also known as: K.I.D.
- Origin: Zürich, Switzerland
- Genres: Pop
- Years active: 1986-1990
- Labels: Phonogram GmbH, Mercury
- Past members: Kilian Merz; Thomas Krucker

Kiss in the Dark (K.I.D.) was a Swiss pop duo from Zürich, Switzerland, formed in 1986 by Kilian Albert Merz (DJKAM) and Thomas Krucker. They signed in 1988 worldwide with Phonogram Records GmbH (Mercury Records) in Germany. In the late 1980s and early 1990s, K.I.D. had several chart successes with tracks such as "The Phonecall", and "Backfield in Motion" in Western Europe, in particular Germany and Switzerland. Most of K.I.D.'s music was recorded and produced at Sigma Sound Studios in New York City, working with the audio engineer and record producer Tony Maserati.

== Discography ==
=== LPs, EPs and singles ===
- 1988: Phonecall (EP), Mercury, Germany
- 1988: "The Phonecall" (Single), Mercury, Germany
- 1988: The Phonecall (EP), Mercury, Germany
- 1989: Backfield in Motion (EP), Mercury, Phonogram, Germany
- 1989: Backfield in Motion (EP), Phonogram, Germany
- 1989: "Backfield in Motion" (Single), Mercury, Phonogram, Germany
- 1989: Something Special (EP), Mercury, Europe
- 1989: Something Special (EP), Mercury, Germany
- 1989: The First Kiss (LP), Mercury, Europe
- 1989: The First Kiss (LP), Phonogram, Switzerland
