= List of Ode to Gallantry characters =

List of characters in the novel Ode to Gallantry by Jin Yong

The following is a list of characters from the wuxia novel Ode to Gallantry by Jin Yong.

== Main character ==
- Shi Potian (石破天) is the protagonist who is often mistaken for Shi Zhongyu due to the similarity in appearance between them. Other names he has been called include Gouzazhong (狗雜種; literally "mongrel", a colloquialism for "bastard"), "Great Dumpling" (大粽子) and "Shi Yidao" (史憶刀).

== Xuansu Manor ==
- Shi Zhongyu (石中玉)
- Shi Qing (石清)
- Min Rou (閔柔)

== Snowy Mountain Sect ==
=== Second generation members ===
- Bai Zizai (白自在) is the leader of the Snowy Mountain Sect. He has depression after his wife left him. He becomes extremely proud and arrogant, and constantly believes that he is the most powerful martial artist in the wulin until he is defeated by Shi Potian. He attends the Laba Feast on Heroes' Island with the intention of upholding the reputation of his sect.
- Cheng Zixue (成自學)
- Qi Zimian (齊自勉)
- Liao Zili (廖自勵)
- Liang Zijin (梁子進)

=== Third generation members ===
- Feng Wanli (封萬里) is the eldest apprentice of Bai Zizai and the master of Shi Zhongyu.
- Bai Wanjian (白萬劍) is Bai Zizai and Shi Xiaocui's son. He is Bai Axiu's father.
- Geng Wanzhong (耿萬鍾)
- Wang Wanren (王萬仞)
- Ke Wanjun (柯萬鈞)
- Huyan Wanshan (呼延萬善)
- Bao Wanye (包萬葉)
- Wang Wanyi (汪萬翼)
- Hua Wanzi (花萬紫) is the youngest apprentice of Bai Zizai.

== Golden Crow Sect ==
- Shi Xiaocui (史小翠), also called Granny Shi (史婆婆), is Bai Zizai's wife and Bai Wanjian's mother. She becomes Shi Potian's martial arts master. Earlier on, she left the Snowy Mountain Sect after a disagreement with her husband and founded the Golden Crow Sect.
- Bai Axiu (白阿繡) is Bai Wanjian's daughter. She attempts suicide by jumping down a cliff after being allegedly raped by Shi Zhongyu, but is later saved by Shi Xiaocui. She meets Shi Potian by chance and falls in love with him.

== Changle Clan ==
- Situ Heng (司徒橫) is the former leader of the clan and Shi Zhongyu's predecessor. He leaves the clan after refusing to accept the expected invitation from Heroes' Island and engaging in an argument with Shi Zhongyu.
- Bei Haishi (貝海石) is the deputy leader of the clan. He makes Shi Zhongyu join the clan and become its puppet leader. He is the mastermind behind the mix-up between Shi Potian and Shi Zhongyu; he made marks on Shi Potian to make him replace Shi Zhongyu as the leader of the Changle Clan in an attempt to escape from being its leader and receive the invitation from Heroes' Island.
- Chen Chongzhi (陳沖之)
- Mi Hengye (米橫野)
- Zhan Fei (展飛)
- Shijian (侍劍) is Shi Zhongyu's servant.

== Ding family and associates ==
- Ding Dang (丁璫) is Shi Zhongyu's lover.
- Ding Busan (丁不三) is Ding Dang's grandfather.
- Ding Busi (丁不四) is Ding Busan's younger brother.
- Mei Wenxin (梅文馨)
- Mei Fanggu (梅芳姑) is the illegitimate daughter of Ding Busi and Mei Wenxin. She is the stepmother of Shi Potian and treats him badly, but her true identity is not revealed until the end of the novel.

== Heroes' Island ==
- Zhang San (張三) and Li Si (李四) are the sworn brothers of Shi Potian. They are the apprentices of the lords of Heroes' Island. They are feared for their ruthlessness throughout the wulin. They meet Shi Potian by chance and forge a friendship with him.
- Island Lord Long (龍島主) and Island Lord Mu (木島主) are the lords of Heroes' Island and masters of Zhang San and Li Si. They die soon upon finding out the truth behind the carvings on the caves on the island from Shi Potian.

== Four major sect leaders of Guandong ==
- Fan Yifei (范一飛)
- Gao Sanniangzi (高三娘子)
- Lü Zhengping (呂正平)
- Feng Liang (風良)

== Shangqing Temple ==
- Tianxu (天虛)
- Chongxu (沖虛) is the ill-tempered junior of Tianxu. He engages Shi Potian in a duel after Shi unintentionally insulted him.
- Lingxu (靈虛)
- Zhaoxu (照虛)
- Tongxu (通虛)

== Others ==
- Xie Yanke (謝煙客) is a martial artist living on Sky-scraping Cliff. He is the owner of the Black Iron Tablets. He holds Gouzazhong captive, takes him to the cliff and deliberately teaches him neigong cultivation techniques in the wrong order in the hope that Gouzazhong would end up in a zouhuorumo state and eventually die.
- Wu Daotong (吳道通)
- Elder Dabei (大悲老人) is the lord of White Whale Island. He is killed by members of the Changle Clan, but manages to pass 18 wooden dolls to Shi Potian before his death.
- Cheng Dayang (成大洋) is the leader of the Flying Fish Clan. He is killed by Zhang San and Li Si after refusing to join the Laba Feast on Heroes' Island.
- An Fengtian (安奉田), Feng Zhenwu (馮振武) and Taoist Yuancheng (元澄道人) are the chiefs of the Golden Saber Stronghold.
- Zhou Mu (周牧) is a subordinate of An Fengtian who is responsible for the murder of Wu Daotong.
