= Zombie Killer =

Song by Leslie Hall

Song by Leslie Hall

from the album Door Man's Daughter
- Genre: Pop rock
- Length: 2:46
- Label: Hefty Hideaway
- Songwriter: Leslie Hall
- Producer: Leslie Hall

"Zombie Killer" is a song performed by American recording artist Leslie Hall, recorded for her debut studio album, Door Man's Daughter (2006). Hall solely wrote and produced the track, and it serves as the third song in the album.

== Composition ==
"Zombie Killer" is a contemporary pop/rock song that moves at a tempo of 120 beats per minute, and has a length of two minutes and forty six seconds. The track opens with somber pianos that are followed by Hall singing the first lyrics of the song. The chorus takes on a lighter tone, featuring the same pianos, now married with pop rock drums and Hall's harmonies. Leslie's vocals span from G3 to A#5.

== Music video #1 ==
Leslie Hall released a music video for the original version of "Zombie Killer" on August 16, 2007. It uses a black-and-white setting inspired by old horror movies of the 1950s. The music video details Leslie and the other LY's surviving through a zombie apocalypse.

== CeWEBrity version ==
"Zombie Killer"

Single by Leslie Hall featuring Elvira

from the album ceWEBrity
- Released: February 16, 2008
- Genre: Comedy
- Length: 2:49
- Label: Hefty Hideaway
- Songwriter: Leslie Hall
- Producers: Leslie Hall, Arecee

Leslie Hall singles chronology
"How We Go Out" (2007)	"Zombie Killer" (2008)	"Craft Talk" (2009)

Leslie Hall re-recorded "Zombie Killer" for her second studio album, CeWEBrity (2008). This new re-recorded version features vocals from Cassandra Peterson, the actress who played the titular character of Elvira, Mistress of the Dark. The new version was released on February 16, 2008 was released with a 7" vinyl as the second single from ceWEBrity.

=== Music video #2 ===
The second music video for "Zombie Killer" was released the same day as its single released. It was directed by Bobby Ciraldo and Andrew Swant. It consists of Leslie and the LY's performing in a stadium filled with zombies. Elvira makes appearances throughout the video. Throughout the music video, Hall becomes a zombie killer, fulfilling the title of the song.

=== Composition ===
The composition remains similar, though it is now remixed with vocals from Cassandra Peterson.

Hall spoke about the collaboration, saying:

Elvira has been one of my heroes ever since I first watched Elvira, Mistress of the Dark on the TBS Superstation interrupted by commercials. I fell in love immediately with her comedy and diva-like presence. I find a lot of myself in her, with the hair, the attitude. I think I am her unborn child. I knew “Zombie Killer” was right up her alley, and I begged and pleaded and promised her the Internet would respect her for this collaboration.

— Leslie Hall, Brightest Young Things

=== Single track listing ===
All tracks are written by Leslie Hall.

No.	Title	Length
1.	"Zombie Killer"	2:49
2.	"Z.K. Chastity Pariah Mix"

=== Release history ===
Region	Release date	Format
Various	February 16, 2008	7" Vinyl
