= Din Dong =

Cartoon cat of Hong Kong

Din Dong (Chinese: 癲噹) is a Hong Kong–based cartoon cat created by comic authors John Chan and Pam Hung. He is a positive cat with big dreams; his motto is “Impossible is possible”. He often posts illustrations to his Facebook page. He is a multimedia creation covering animation, comics, books, DVDs, apps, and household items, with his show airing on Nippon BS Broadcasting. His animation collections were nominated for the "Famous Animation Section" at the 34th Hong Kong International Film Festival. A Din Dong statue is on the Comic Avenue of Stars in Tsim Sha Tsui.

== Biography ==
Din Dong is its author's pet cat. He was a stray cat living in Hong Kong. One day, the author found this strangely welcoming cat, Din Dong then immediately became their household pet. He is one of the happiest cats in the world, every action of him is unpredictable and hilarious, thus inspired the author to start the comic “Din Dong”. The author hope that Din Dong can let people rethink that happiness is not all related with money and materialism.

== Comic books ==
- Din Dong Book 1 (癲噹-神奇玫瑰花)
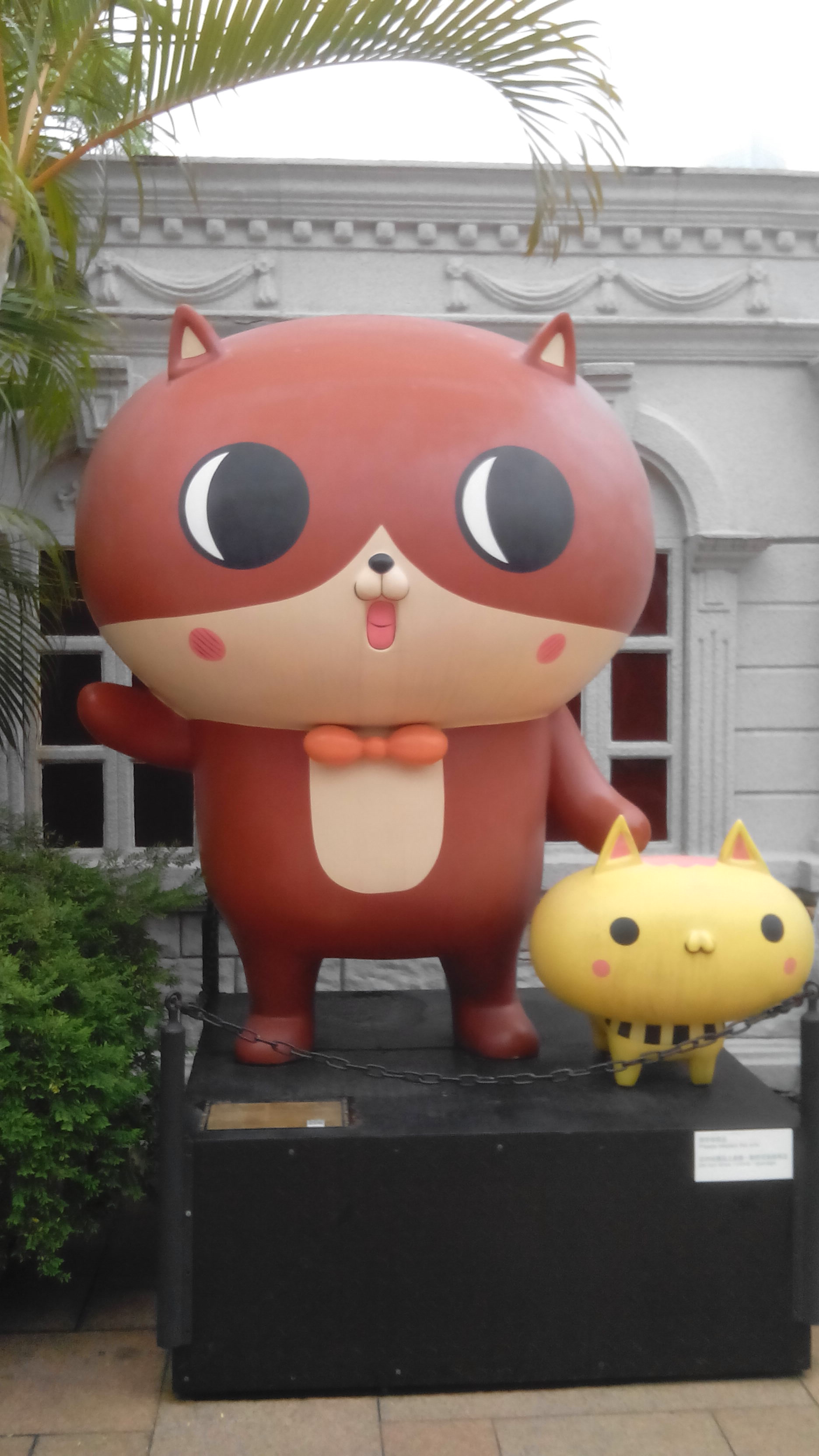
  Din Dong of Hong Kong Comic Avenue of Comic Star
- Din Dong Book 2 (癲噹2-免費去旅行)

== Cartoon ==
Animation was produced based on original comics, every episode is around 1 minute in length, all productions are done by Postgal Workshop, with the music composed by The Pancakes. Animation works are released in "Postgal Animation Collection" DVD, and featured in 34th Hong Kong international Film Festival.

== Game ==
The character's first iOS game application Din dong adventure was released in October 2013, which is based on the comics characters inside the Dindong comics.

== Award ==
The 4th Asiagraph (Japan, Tokyo) – Special Jury Award
