= Destination Friendship =

Studio album by Leslie Hall
- Released: December 1, 2011
- Recorded: Spring–summer 2011
- Length: 30:52
- Label: Hefty Hideaway
- Producers: Leslie Hall; Kate Kennedy

Leslie Hall chronology
Back 2 Back Palz (2010)	Destination Friendship (2011)	Songs in the Key of Gold (2013)

Singles from Destination Friendship
- 1. "Hydrate Jirate" Released: May 8, 2011; 2. "Blame the Booty" Released: December 1, 2011; 3. "Your Not Taken?" Released: May 8, 2012

Destination Friendship is the fourth studio album by American recording artist Leslie Hall, released on December 1, 2011, via Hefty Hideaway. It was supplemented by the singles "Hydrate Jirate", "Blame the Booty", which was released as a 7" vinyl the day of the album's release, and "Your Not Taken?".

== Composition ==
Musically, Destination Friendship is a pop album that incorporates elements of dubstep, trance, and electronic music. It musically resembles the works of pop artists at the time, namely Britney Spears, Kesha, and Katy Perry. The album opens with "Hydrate Jirate," an electropop, techno, and dance track that talks about needing to be hydrated during a party. Its composition was compared to that of Kesha for its use of auto-tune, electro-twinged synthesizers, and techno chorus. This is followed up by the europop and J-pop song "Power Cuddle." "Crazy Now" is an electro pop rock song about the protagonist discovering their partner is "crazy." The second single, "Your Not Taken?" is described as an 80's inspired synthpop song describing the protagonist's infatuation with a lover, wondering why they are not taken. "Here to Win" is an R&B-licked electropop and dance song that incorporate dance beats, electro-twinged synthesizers, and fast speed rapping.

"Lonely Waltz" is a hip hop and EDM song that emphasizes on Hall's rapping and minimalistic, futuristic EDM drum machines and beats. "What We're Eating," the most different song on the track, is a comedic country song that uses Hall's vocals from the dance tracks. "No Pants Policy" is an electro song that talks about not wearing pants while dancing at a party. "Purchase One" is a hi-NRG inspired electro house song that incorporates Hall's rapping. The album closes with electro-dance remixes of two of Hall's previous songs "Tight Pants/Body Rolls" and "Blame the Booty."

== Promotion ==
=== Tour ===
Leslie and the LY's toured to promote Destination Friendship in 2012. The tour kicked off with a 7" vinyl release show. She uploaded a preview of the tour to her YouTube channel on February 8, 2012. The group also made an appearance on MTN's Freaky Deeky where they performed "Power Cuddle" and "She's Got Pants."

=== Singles ===
- "Hydrate Jirate" was uploaded to Hall's main channel as the lead single on May 8, 2011.
- The remix of "Blame the Booty" was released on December 1, 2011, as the second single from the album.
- "Your Not Taken?" was released on May 8, 2012, as the third and final single promoting Destination Friendship.

=== Other songs ===
- The album's second song, "Power Cuddle" was used as a promotional tool to promote the album in early 2011.
- "Hydrate Jirate" was uploaded to Hall's main channel on May 8, 2011.
- Another song entitled "She's Got Pants" was used as a promotional tool. Unlike "Power Cuddle," it did not make the final album.
- The song "No Pants Policy" was remixed by Titus Jones and released as a single of the remix album Songs in the Key of Gold. Making the remixed version of the song become one of Leslie's most successful singles.

== Critical reception ==
Lan Truong of Bust Magazine gave the album a positive review, writing that "Hall’s distinctive style adds humor to her sexual lyrics," and wrote that the album "clings to irony rather than heartfelt contemplations throughout." Truong finished the review by writing "if you’re looking for laughs and a dance-floor jam, Hall is your girl."

== Track listing ==
All tracks are written by Leslie Hall and Ramona Muse. All music by Leslie Hall and Kate Kennedy.

No.	Title	Length
1.	"Hydrate Jirate"	3:17
2.	"Power Cuddle"	2:54
3.	"Crazy Now"	2:31
4.	"Your Not Taken?"	2:32
5.	"Here to Win"	3:00
6.	"Lonely Waltz"	2:21
7.	"What We're Eating"	1:51
8.	"No Pants Policy"	3:34
9.	"Purchase One"	2:58
10.	"Tight Pants/Body Rolls" (Utopia Park Remix)	3:33
11.	"Blame the Booty" (Titus Jones Remix)	3:53
Total length:		30:52

== Personnel ==
Taken from Leslie Hall's website.

- Leslie Hall - lead vocals, songwriting, producer
- Ramona Muse - songwriting
- Kate Kennedy - producer
- Cassidy Hall - backing vocals

== Release history ==
Region	Release date	Format	Label	Ref.
United States	December 1, 2011	Digital Download	Hefty Hideaway	
United States	December 1, 2011	CD	Hefty Hideaway	
