= Leslie Hall =

American singer (b. 1981)

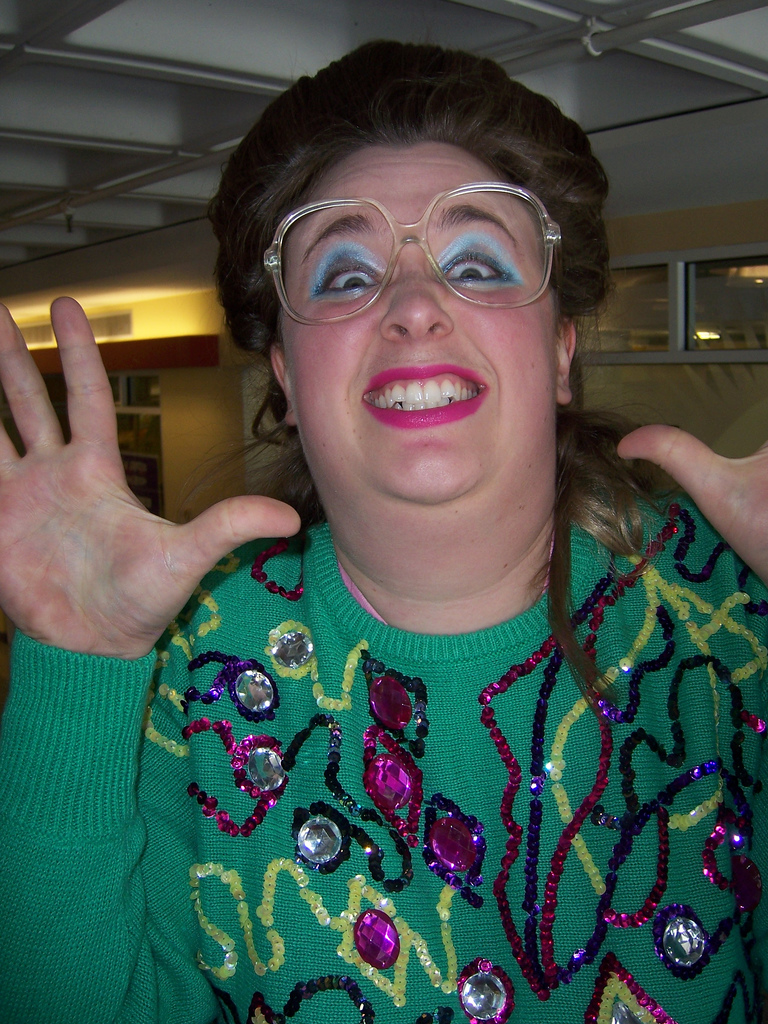
- Hall in 2008

Background information
- Born: Leslie Merritt Hall; November 15, 1981 (age 44); Ames, Iowa, U.S.
- Genres: Hip hop; dance-pop; comedy
- Occupations: Singer, songwriter, producer, director, actress
- Instruments: Vocals; piano
- Years active: 2004–present
- Label: Hefty Hideaway
- Website: www.lesliehall.com

Leslie Merritt Hall (born November 15, 1981) is an American satirical rap artist and front-woman for the band Leslie and the LY's. She also operates a "gem sweater museum". She is best known for the YouTube hits like "How We Go Out" and "Tight Pants/Body Rolls". She is also currently a member of pop duo Neon & Nude.

== Musical career ==
=== 2000–05: Career beginnings, Leslie and the LY's, and Gold Pants ===
Hall began collecting gem sweaters in 2000 and, with the help of her fans, has since amassed over 400 different sweaters. Hall modeled these sweaters on the website gemsweater.com, garnering significant Internet traffic such that she was asked to appear on one of the final episodes of Unscrewed with Martin Sargent. In her 2004 TechTV interview, she stated that "about 65% of the comments" from the gemsweater.com message boards were related to a particular outfit of hers that included gold pants. In the summer of 2005, Hall received a $1,200 grant from the School of the Museum of Fine Arts to turn an RV into a mobile gemsweater museum. She decided to form a band, Leslie and the LY's, with former classmates, capitalizing on the popularity of her gem-laden sweaters and gold pants. In 2005, her band released their first album, Gold Pants.

=== 2006–08: Door Man's Daughter and ceWEBrity ===
In 2006, Hall followed up with a self-released solo record, Door Man's Daughter, and toured the globe in support of it. She was named one of the "40 Greatest Internet Superstars" by VH1. Later in 2006, she appeared with fellow Internet personalities Jay Maynard, also known as "Tron Guy", and Randy Constan, a Peter Pan impersonator, to take a stand in the "battle over Internet freedom" in favor of network neutrality.

In 2007, she teamed up with Dungeon Majesty to create the video "Willow Don't Cry".

In 2008, she appeared with Tay Zonday in a commercial for Firefox web browser, singing a song titled "Firefox Users Against Boredom", a parody of "We Are the World". Leslie toured in support of her 2008 album, ceWEBrity. She released a music video (and single) called "Zombie Killer" featuring Elvira, Mistress of the Dark on guest vocals, with cameos by Mark Borchardt and Mike Schank of American Movie fame.

=== 2009–10: Back2Back Palz ===
Leslie's newest songs, as of 2009 were "Craft Talk" and "Tight Pants/Body Rolls", the latter of which has amassed over 24 million views on YouTube as of April 2022, making it Hall's most popular single on that service. The music video for "Tight Pants/Body Rolls" premiered January 17, 2009 at her show in Ames but has since been released alongside "Gravel In My Shoe". Her 2010 album, Back2Back Palz, features these two singles, as well as 11 country music inspired songs. She embarked on a US tour for the record in early 2010, with Christopher the Conquered serving as the opening act.

=== 2011–14: Destination Friendship and Songs in the Key of Gold ===
In March 2011, Leslie and the LY's made appearances on MTN's Freaky Deeky where they performed "Power Cuddle" and "She's Got Pants", which were used to promote her then-upcoming fifth studio album. On May 8, 2011, Hall released the single "Hydrate Jirate", as the first single from her fifth studio album Destination Friendship, then released the album itself on December 1, 2011. Hall joined her band Leslie and the LY's to promote Destination Friendship in 2012. She uploaded a preview of the tour to her YouTube channel on February 8, 2012. On May 8, 2012, she released a music video for Destination Friendship's second single, "Your Not Taken?".

In 2013, Hall released the track "No Pants Policy", the first and only single from her sixth studio album, Songs in the Key of Gold. The album featured remixes from Titus Jones. She then released the album on December 14, 2013. She toured from January 2014 to March 2014 in the United States to promote the record.

=== 2015–present: Neon & Nude ===
Hall is now a member of pop duo Neon & Nude with former Leslie and the LY's member Kate Kennedy. They released three videos in 2013, 2015, and 2017: "Look in Love," "Kiss in the Dark," and "I'll Try to Improve." They released their debut studio album, Neon & Nude: Featuring the Feminine Gazes, on May 4, 2017. In 2018 Hall began a live web show Yarn House Live being streamed via Facebook Live, and later YouTube Live.

== Acting career ==
In April 2007, Hall appeared on MTV's Total Request Live.

On September 27, 2007, Hall appeared on the children's show Yo Gabba Gabba!, to perform in the "Dancey Dance" segment of an episode titled "Scary". She appeared again on October 21, 2008 in the season two episode titled "Differences". In October 2010, she began making guest appearances with the show's live touring act. She later returned for one episode in the 2024 revival Yo Gabba Gabbaland! where she played a hairstylist to one of the main characters.

In 2013, Hall appeared in the episode "Summer Camp!" of The Hub series The Aquabats! Super Show!, a superhero-themed comedy from the creators of Yo Gabba Gabba!, where she played a gem sweater-wearing camp counselor named Jewel, who happens to be a shapeshifting were-ape. Hall appears in the feature film Hamlet A.D.D..

In 2018, Hall co-created and starred in "Yarn House Live," a series of live stream shows on the Yarn House Live YouTube channel. Hall would act alongside her puppet pal Ribbons the hen in front of a live studio audience, broadcasting from a barn in Ames, Iowa. The show covered various topics such as "Kids," "Food," and "Art," as well as a simulated telethon. The live show concluded with a holiday special on December 8, 2018, filmed at the Des Moines Art Center in front of a sold out crowd. Hall performed several of her songs for the audience after the scripted show.

In 2018, Hall also voiced "Big Dook" in Pickle and Peanut.

In 2023, Hall released two episodes of "Yarn House" on her personal YouTube channel. This version, while similar to "Yarn House Live," includes more heavily-edited elements, visual effects, and claymation as well as a higher-quality image and an overall better production quality due to being prerecorded rather than filmed live. These episodes were partially funded by Hall's patreon supporters.

== Personal life ==
Hall first began displaying herself in "strangely glamorous and unflattering ways" while attending Ames High School in Iowa. During her senior year, she entered the homecoming parade, as part of a prom queen campaign, donning a sparkling pink Goodwill gown, neck brace, and a tiara (worn by her mother, who was crowned Miss Auburn, Nebraska in 1970). The next day, her effort made the front page of the local newspaper. Her campaign was a success as she was later crowned queen. After graduating from high school, Hall moved to Boston, Massachusetts to attend the School of the Museum of Fine Arts for four years and graduated in May 2005. Hall has an older brother who goes by the pseudonym "Arecee" who helps produce some of Leslie's records and does his own hip hop music.

== Discography ==
=== Albums ===
Title	Album details
Door Man's Daughter	Released: October 5, 2006; Label: Hefty Hideaway; Format: Digital download, CD
Gold Pants/Door Man's Daughter - Double Album	Released: 2008; Label: Hefty Hideaway; Format: CD
ceWEBrity	Released: February 26, 2008; Label: Hefty Hideaway; Format: Digital download, CD
Back 2 Back Palz	Released: January 12, 2010; Label: Hefty Hideaway; Format: Digital download, CD
Destination Friendship	Released: December 1, 2011; Label: Hefty Hideaway; Format: Digital download, CD
Songs in the Key of Gold	Released: December 14, 2013; Label: Hefty Hideaway, Yarn House; Format: Digital download, CD, Vinyl

=== Singles ===
Single	Year	Album
"Mother Gem Lullaby"	2006	Door Man's Daughter
"Willow Don't Cry"	2007	Door Man's Daughter
"How We Go Out"	2007	ceWEBrity
"Zombie Killer" (Remix)	2008	ceWEBrity
"Craft Talk"	2009	Back 2 Back Palz
"Tight Pants/Body Rolls"	2010	Back 2 Back Palz
"Gravel in My Shoe"	2010	Back 2 Back Palz
"Hydrate Jirate"	2011	Destination Friendship
"Blame the Booty" (Titus Jones Remix)	2011	Destination Friendship
"Your Not Taken?"	2012	Destination Friendship
"No Pants Policy" (Titus Jones Remix)	2013	Songs in the Key of Gold

== Filmography ==
=== Film ===
Year	Title	Role
2008	Zombie Killer	Zombie Killer
2014	Hamlet A.D.D.	Zombie Killer

=== Television ===
Year	Title	Role	Notes
2004	Unscrewed with Martin Sargent	Herself	Episode: Internet Phenomenon Leslie Hall Shares Her Gem Sweaters/Music and Beat Greets
2006	Web Junk 20	Herself	Episode: 40 greatest internet superstars
2007	Total Request Live	Herself	Episode: April 2007
2007-2013	Yo Gabba Gabba!	Herself	5 episodes
2013	The Aquabats! Super Show!	Camp Counselor Jewel	Episode: Summer Camp!
2017	Pickle and Peanut	Big Dook	1 episode
2024	Yo Gabba GabbaLand!	Herself	1 episode
