= Back 2 Back Palz =

Studio album by Leslie Hall
- Released: January 12, 2010
- Recorded: 2008–09
- Genre: Novelty, dance-pop, electropop, musical comedy
- Length: 40:04
- Label: Hefty Hideaway
- Producer: Leslie Hall

Leslie Hall chronology
Cewebrity (2008)	Back 2 Back Palz (2010)	Destination Friendship (2011)

Singles from Back 2 Back Palz
- 1. "Craft Talk" Released: March 3, 2009; 2. "Tight Pants/Body Rolls" Released: January 12, 2010; 3. "Gravel in My Shoe" Released: February 1, 2010

Back 2 Back Palz is the third studio album by Leslie Hall, released on January 12, 2010 by Hefty Hideaway. The group toured the US in 2010 to promote the album, with Christopher the Conquered serving as the opening act.

The album includes the single “Tight Pants/Body Rolls,” which has become a viral hit with over 23.4 million views on YouTube. Other singles “Craft Talk” and “Gravel In My Shoe” were also released to promote the album, though they generated less success. The three videos have generated a combined total of 23.4 million views. The album also contains an acoustic version of “Blame the Booty,” from their previous album, “ceWEBrity.”

== Composition ==
When writing Back2Back Palz, Hall stated that she aimed for an album that “goes down a different path.” The result was an album that has a diverse musical composition, consisting of pop, country, folk, dance, hip hop, rock, dance-pop, and electronic. The opening track, “Craft Talk” is an electro song about craft people. The music video was released on March 3, 2009. The second song is “Tight Pants/Body Rolls,” a technopop song about forest people wearing tight pants. The song became a viral hit, generating over 11 million views. Songs such as “Sew What,” “Braid My Hair,” “Churn The Butter,” “Dust Lover,” “Chop Chop Chop,” are heavily influenced by country and bluegrass. “Gravel In My Shoe” is a dry country rock song about a broken relationship and the protagonist breaking up with them. “Cat Dancer” is a worldbeat song, taking inspiration using sitars mainly in its composition. The closing track, “Water Water Water-World” is a technopop and electronic song that heavily uses vocal processing effects during the song. All of the songs were composed using the Apple program GarageBand.

== Promotion ==
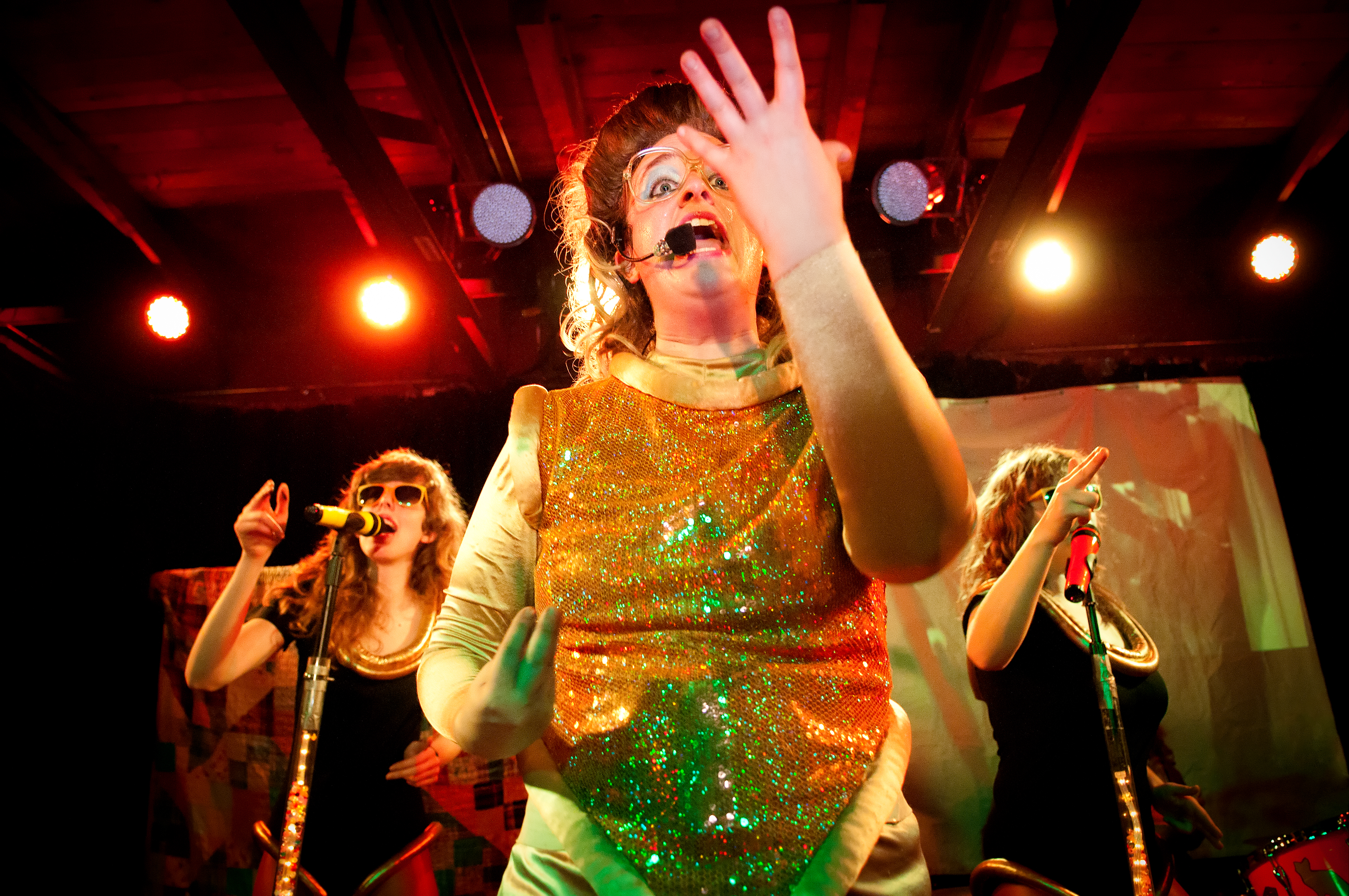
Leslie and the LY's performing in 2010.

=== Singles and music videos ===
- “Craft Talk” was released as the lead single from Back 2 Back Palz on March 3, 2009. The music video for "Craft Talk" reaching 619,000 views as of 2016.
- “Tight Pants/Body Rolls” premiered on January 17, 2009 at a show in Ames, and was released on January 12, 2010 as the second single on the album. Its reception was polarized, it was described as “terrifying, but catchy” and “second to none.” The song has become a viral hit and since accumulated 23.4 million views.
- “Gravel In My Shoe” was released as the third and final single on February 1, 2010, the same day "Tight Pants/Body Rolls" was uploaded to YouTube. It has attained nearly 183,000 views as of October 2016. Outside of this YouTube success, the songs have failed to chart in any territory. An additional music video for "Blame the Booty" was released on August 24, 2009. It has accumulated 539,300 views as of 2016.

=== Tour ===
Starting in February 2010, Leslie & The LY’s embarked on a US tour to promote the album. Christopher the Conquered served as the opening act.

== Critical reception ==
Cdbaby.com gave the album a brief review, stating, "Well. Leslie has now written a country craft album. The CD starts with the dance hits but moves to a lonely-folk child. Who's Iowa isolation has lead [sic] to lots of yearning and zero burning. Mostly about loves lost and loves desired." They finished their review by describing the CD as "bizarre."

== Track listing ==
All tracks are written by Leslie Hall.

No.	Title	Length
1.	"Craft Talk"	3:20
2.	"Tight Pants/Body Rolls"	3:00
3.	"Crystal Diamond Women Flow"	3:15
4.	"Gravel In My Shoe"	2:34
5.	"Sew What"	2:15
6.	"Cat Dancer"	2:17
7.	"Braid My Hair"	1:59
8.	"Churn the Butter"	2:10
9.	"Rebuilt My House"	2:29
10.	"Dust Lover"	2:07
11.	"Chop Chop Chop"	2:42
12.	"Man-ila Envelope"	3:45
13.	"Moving Out of Iowa"	2:39
14.	"Blame the Booty" (Acoustic version)	3:06
15.	"Water Water Water World"	2:26
Total length:		40:04

== Release history ==
Region	Released	Format	Ref
United States	January 2010	CD	
United States	January 2010	Digital Download	
