= Gold Pants =

Studio album by Leslie and the LY's
- Released: March 11, 2005
- Recorded: 2004
- Genre: Electronic
- Length: 29:00
- Label: Hefty Hideaway
- Producer: Leslie Hall

Singles from Gold Pants
- 1. "Gem Sweater" Released: March 11, 2005; 2. "Gold Pants" Released: May 15, 2005

Gold Pants is the debut and only studio album by American pop music group Leslie and the LY's, released to iTunes on March 11, 2005. and released in CD format on March 15, 2005. The record serves as front-woman Leslie Hall's first musical project after she became known on the internet for her gem sweater website. Hall then enlisted school friends to form the band. After performing several of the songs at open mic events, the group recorded and released the record.

Despite not entering any international record charts, the album did receive much internet attention and viral success. Hall promoted the record with a TV appearance on Unscrewed with Martin Sargent, accompanied with a live performance. The album was supported by the release of two singles. "Gem Sweater" was released as the lead single from the record, and experienced viral success on YouTube. "Gold Pants" was released as the second single and was supported by a five-track EP with American hip hop recording artist Arecee. Gold Pants serves as the only release by the group, as Hall released all of her other musical projects as a musical artist.

== Composition ==
Gold Pants is a primarily electronic album, with influences of pop, hip hop, and house music. The album was produced using GarageBand. Jason Sellards of Paper Magazine described the album as "chock-full of catchy jams and horrifying piano ballads."

== Promotion ==
=== Single ===
- "Gem Sweater" had a music video released in 2005 and was released as the lead single. The song experienced viral success. The music video reached 20,000 views as of 2018.
- "Gold Pants" served as the album's second official single, which was released with a 7" vinyl EP on May 15, 2005. The music video was released in 2005, and has reached 26,000 views as of 2018.

=== Other songs ===
- "Ring A Ding-Ding" was premiered on Unscrewed with Martin Sargent on November 23, 2004. A music video was released, which has garnered 118,000 views as of 2018.

== Track listing ==
All tracks are written by Leslie Hall, except for "Sweater Girl", which is written by Beef Humper

No.	Title	Length
1.	"Ring A Ding-Ding"	2:23
2.	"Gold Pants"	1:33
3.	"Tune In Tokyo"	2:13
4.	"Danger Puss"	1:38
5.	"Only In My Dreams"	1:38
6.	"Danga Stranga"	2:46
7.	"Master of the Mic"	1:15
8.	"Rollin' with the Homies"	1:18
9.	"Beware of the Beats"	1:27
10.	"UFO Jams"	1:53
11.	"Gem Sweater"	2:51
12.	"Rapper's Destiny"	2:01
13.	"Beat Box Radio"	2:24
14.	"Sweater Girl"	2:20
15.	"Dinosaur Respect" (Secret Song)	2:09
Total length:		29:00

== Release history ==
Release date	Released	Format	Ref.
2005	United States	CD	
2005	United States	Digital download	
