= Leslie and the LY's =

US musical group

Leslie & the LY's
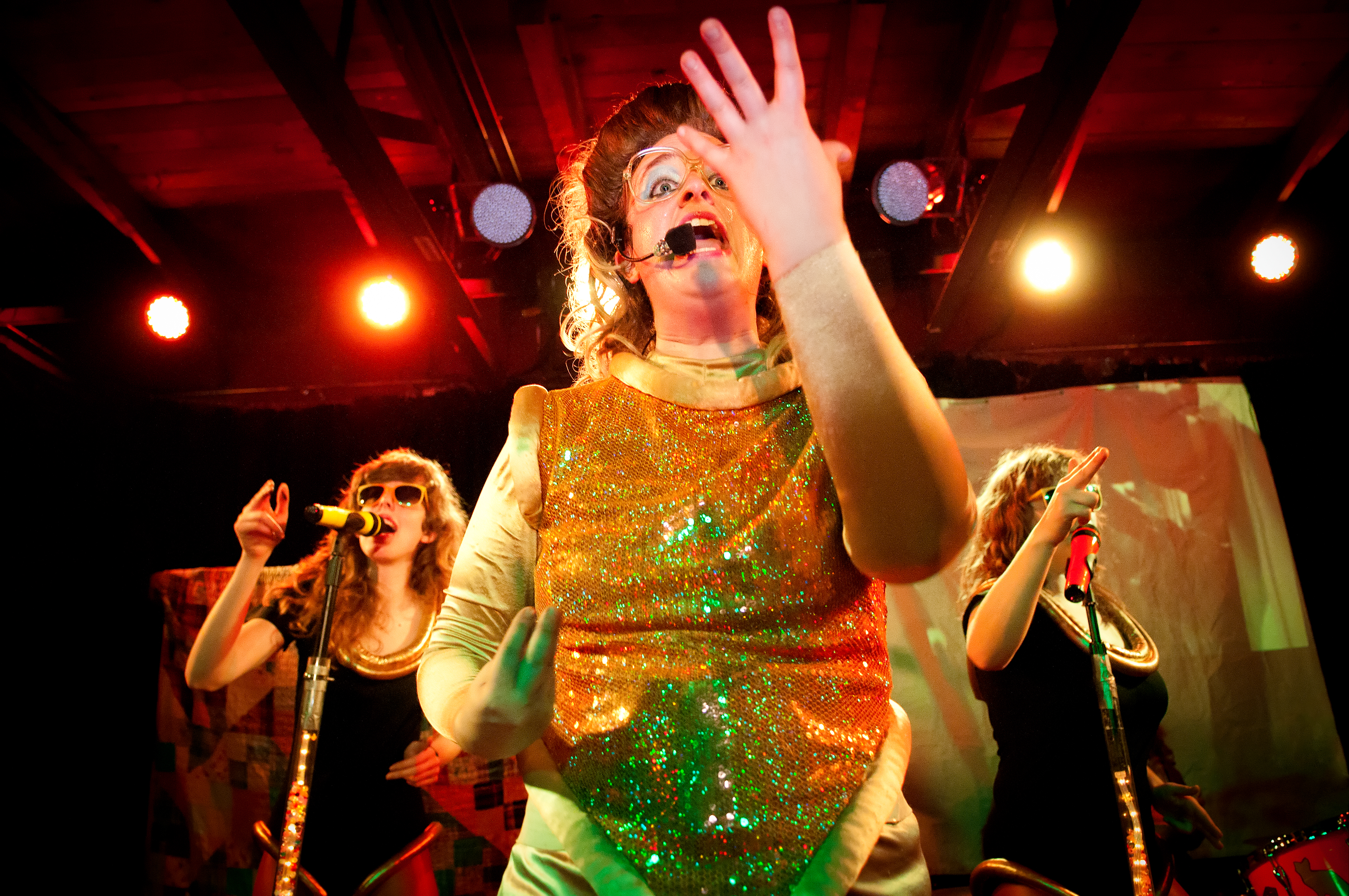
- Leslie and the LY's performing in Salt Lake City in 2010

Background information
- Origin: Ames, Iowa, United States
- Genres: Hip hop, comedy
- Years active: 2004–2014
- Labels: Hefty Hideaway
- Past members: Leslie Hall; Ramona "Mona Bonez" Muse; Karen "Scraps" Kvitek; Grace "Grazie" Locke-Ward; Kristilyn "Klassy K" Stevenson; Sassy Cassie; Emily "Obese E" Hyde "DJ Dr." Laura De Waal
- Website: leslieandthelys.com

Leslie & the LY's was a pop music band from Ames, Iowa that began as an open mike trio in 2004.

Leslie & the LY's is made up of front-woman Leslie Hall, also known as Mother Gem, who composes all of the music herself generally using the Apple Computer program GarageBand. Other past and present members include, DJ Dr. Laura on the turn-tables, and Klassy K on the keytar and dance, OBESE E on turn-tables, Sassy Cassie, & K To the Double L on backing vocals.

Hall has since established The Mobile Museum of Gem Sweaters, which doubles both as the band's official tour vehicle and gift shop/museum, which sometimes appears at her shows. She has been featured in Vice magazine, on television with VH1 and G4, and has had music videos featured on AtomFilms and Yahoo!'s main page. In 2006, Leslie was filmed as part of space150's viral campaign for We Are the Web, a site that advocates net neutrality. Fans of the band are known as Junior Gems.

The group has been inactive since Hall started to focus more on her other musical project, Neon & Nude.

== Tours ==
Leslie & The LY's toured the US in 2010 in support of Hall's album, Back2Back Palz; the tour began in Chicago, Illinois on February 12, 2010 with supporting act Christopher the Conquered. They have also toured for Hall's 2013 album, Songs in the Key of Gold.

== Discography ==
=== Albums ===
- Gold Pants (2005)

=== Singles ===
- "Gem Sweater" (2005)
- "Gold Pants" – Split 45 (2005)

== TV appearances ==
- Leslie Hall, DJ Dr. Laura, and the Junior Gems on Nick Jr's "Yo Gabba Gabba" doing a Dancey Dance: The Razzle Dazzle
- Leslie Hall solo on "Yo Gabba Gabba" performing "All My Friends are Different"
- Featured as the number 20 Greatest Internet Superstar on VH1
- Featured on G4/TechTV's "Unscrewed with Martin Sargent"
