= Participatory art =

Art which has public co-authoring or editing

Participatory art is an approach to making art which engages public participation in the creative process, letting them become co-authors, editors, and observers of the work. This type of art is incomplete without viewers' physical interaction. It intends to challenge the dominant form of making art in the West, in which a small class of professional artists make the art while the public takes on the role of passive observer or consumer, i.e., buying the work of the professionals in the marketplace. Commended works by advocates who popularized participatory art include Augusto Boal in his Theater of the Oppressed, as well as Allan Kaprow in happenings.

One of the earliest usages of the term appears in photographer Richard Ross's review for the Los Angeles Institute of Contemporary Art journal of the exhibition "Downtown Los Angeles Artists", organized by the Santa Barbara Contemporary Arts Forum in 1980. Describing in situ works by Jon Peterson, Maura Sheehan and Judith Simonian anonymously placed around Santa Barbara, Ross wrote, "These artists bear the responsibility to the community. Their art is participatory."

== Definition ==
Participatory art requires of the artist that they either not be present, or that they somehow are able to recede far enough to become equal with the participants. This is the only way that participants might be offered the agency of creation; without this detail, participants will always respond within the domain of authority of the artist; they will be subjugated in this way, and the work will fail to be participatory. This detail is centrally important in asserting participation as a form in itself, and effectively differentiates participation from interactive, community based art and socially engaged art. Any of these techniques can include the presence of the artist, as it will not impinge upon the outcome of the work in the same way.

There are various degrees of participation from nominal manipulation of an object like the wearable sculptures of Lygia Clark to the relinquishing of the artist's body to the whims of the audience in the 1974 performance Rhythm 0 by Marina Abramović. New media theorist Beryl Graham has compared the varying degrees of participation in the arts to the eight rungs of power described in Sherry Arnstein's "Ladder of Citizen Participation"—ranging from manipulation to token consulting, to complete citizen control.

In the Fall/Winter issue of Oregon Humanities magazine, writer Eric Gold describes "an artistic tradition called 'social practice,' which refers to works of art in which the artist, audience, and their interactions with one another are the medium. While a painter uses pigment and canvas, and a sculptor wood or metal, the social practice artist often creates a scenario in which the audience is invited to participate. Although the results may be documented with photography, video, or otherwise, the artwork is really the interactions that emerge from the audience's engagement with the artist and the situation."

Participatory or interactive art creates a dynamic collaboration between the artist, the audience and their environment. Participatory art invites the audience to participate in the co-creation of art, rather than observing it quietly from a distance. The forms this can take are widely varied. Viewers may potentially touch, smell, write on, talk to, dance with, or play with the artwork in question.

== Distinctions between other forms of artistic participation ==
The term 'participation' is sometimes used as an umbrella term for general public or community engagement with art, but this is distinct from participatory art. Participatory art is a distinct approach with its own nuances. It is distinguishable by the absence of the author, and the complete agency granted to all participants.

Artworks which engage with the public are not 'participatory art' by default, but have sometimes been treated as such. 'Community-based art', 'interactive art', and 'socially-engaged art' are all related to participatory art, but are generally considered to be distinct approaches, as they do not abide by the absence of the author or the full participation of the audience as seen in participatory art.

Community engagement (for example, selecting the site of an art project to best engage an impoverished community) is not the same as a community participating in the co-creation of art. Some art labelled as 'interactive' may also be exclusive, only offering the opportunity for a select few members of the public to collaborate on the project (e.g. 100 community members working to make art directly with an artist to present in a museum). In this case, there remains a distinction between the artist and the community members, and the eventual audience is still separated from the co-creation process. As the artist continues to have a physical presence in these participatory approaches, this compromises the autonomy of the participants and prevents them from truly acting as artistic co-creators.

The conflation between community-based art and participatory art may be related to the development of the term relational aesthetics by Nicolas Bourriaud in the late 1990s.

Popular culture and media beyond visual art have become increasingly participatory with the rise of the Internet and social media, which allow users to "participate" at a distance. This is generally considered to be a distinct phenomenon from participatory art.

== Examples ==
In 1974 Bonnie Ora Sherk created "The farm" (San Francisco) - a seven acre participatory work of art in a disused section of freeway as a living work of art.

In 1978 Barry Thomas planted 150-180 cabbage seedlings in the form of the word CABBAGE then, using the media, he deliberately challenged the public by walking away so the city had to own and participate in the work of art. He called this challenge "Jeter le gant" and the six month Wellington occupation Vacant Lot of Cabbages.

Janet Cardiff has created various audio tours that users experience by walking site-specific routes and listening to soundscapes composed by the artist.

Figment is an annual showcase of participatory art in New York City.

Antony Gormley has involved the public in the creation of several works, most notably One & Other which invited hundreds of participants to occupy the vacant plinth in Trafalgar Square and perform or otherwise contribute to the work.

Carsten Höller has created interactive installations like Test Site (2006), which invites participants to play on giant slides installed in the Tate Modern.

Allan Kaprow pioneered the field of participatory art with his Happening events staged in 1960's New York City, which used physical installations and prompts to facilitate aesthetic experiences for participants.

Learning to Love you More (2002–2009) was a work of Internet art by Miranda July and Harrell Fletcher that invited participants to submit responses to written prompts, and displayed an archive of the resulting works of conceptual art.

Adrian Piper led a series of events titled Funk Lessons (1982–1984) that combined participatory dance-parties with conversations and lectures about African-American culture.

The project Sculpture Mobs (2008–), initiated by monochrom, invites participants to collaboratively construct temporary sculptures in public space.

== Influences ==
Folk and tribal art can be considered to be a predecessor or model for contemporary "participatory art" in that many or all of the members of the society participate in the making of "art". However, the ideological issue of use arises at this point because art made in the institutions of art is by default, already part of the art world, and therefore its perceived use is entirely different from any ritualistic or traditional practices expressed by folk or tribal groups. As the ethnomusicologist Bruno Nettl wrote, the tribal group "has no specialization or professionalization; its division of labor depends almost exclusively on sex and occasionally on age, and only rarely are certain individuals proficient in any technique to a distinctive degree ... the same songs are known by all the members of the group, and there is little specialization in composition, performance or instrument making."

== See also ==
- Community art
- Public participation
- Relational art
- Social practice art
- Social choreography
- Specialization
- Systems art

=== Subtypes of participatory art ===
- Comic Book Project
- Create a Comic Project
- Photovoice

== Bibliography ==
- Grant Kester. Conversation Pieces: Community and Communication in Modern Art, University of California Press, 2004.
- Claire Bishop (ed.), Participation: Documents of Contemporary Art, Whitechapel Gallery/The MIT Press, 2006.
- Robert Atkins, Rudolf Frieling, Boris Groys, Lev Manovich, The Art of Participation: 1950 to Now, Thames & Hudson, 2008.
- Anna Dezeuze (ed.), The 'Do-it-yourself' Artwork: Participation from Fluxus to New Media, Manchester University Press, 2010.
- Grant Kester, The One and the Many: Contemporary Collaborative Art in a Global Context, Duke University Press, 2011.
- Shannon Jackson, Social Works: Performing Art, Supporting Publics, Routledge, 2011.
- Claire Bishop, Artificial Hells: Participatory Art and the Politics of Spectatorship, Verso Books, 2012.
- Kathryn Brown (ed.), Interactive Contemporary Art: Participation in Practice, I.B. Tauris, 2014.
- Falk Heinrich. Performing Beauty in Participatory Art and Culture, Routledge, 2014.
- Sruti Bala. The Gestures of Participatory Art, Manchester University Press, 2018.
- Vadim Keylin. Participatory Sound Art: Technologies, Aesthetics, Politics, Palgrave Macmillan, 2023.
