= Maura Sheehan =

American installation artist and sculptor

Maura Sheehan is an American installation artist and sculptor who works with unconventional materials. She is on the faculty of the BFA Fine Arts Department, School of Visual Arts New York., and the founder and director of the Manhattan Art Program, a non-profit educational organisation providing innovative art programs to disadvantaged communities in USA Ireland and North Africa.

== Career ==
In 1980 Sheehan's work was in an exhibition of "Downtown Los Angeles Artists," organized by the Santa Barbara Contemporary Arts Forum, anonymously placed in situ around the town Santa Barbara. Richard Ross described her art and that of Jon Peterson and Judith Simonian as 'participatory', one of the first uses of the term in relation to art. Ross wrote, "These artists bear the responsibility to the community. "

Maura Sheehan is a community artist who encourages viewers to interact with her art and to help shape it. For example, Sheehan calls her Humanities Gallery of 2013 a 'non-site' like Andre Malraux's 'Museum without Walls' where she has displayed a glass spiral splintered to symbolise broken promises. As visitors walk on the glass path they inevitably break it and contribute to what Sheehan describes as a 'protracted entropic metaphysical disintegration that reveals a regenerating geometry and an architectural allegory underfoot'. Sheehan has said the influence for her work called Glass Garden was the Russian architect, Vladimir Tatlin's experiments with extending spaces from a solid base. This work is seen as a celebration of shared ideals where space 'unspools from a cracking constructivist composition and the spiral is reminiscent of capitalism in crisis.'

Broken glass is an ongoing feature in her work, from early installations at the Orchard Gallery, Derry (1989) to Ocean Floor (1990) which both use automated windshields. in 1998 Maura Sheehan did an installation at the Neuberger museum of art, part of the exhibition Glass Houses, again using windshields.

== Exhibitions ==
Exhibitions include: Centro Anduluz de Arte Contemporaneo Museum of Modern Art New York The Station Museum of Contemporary Art FiveMyles Gallery

Awards include: CAPS, Pollock-Krasner Foundation, National Endowment for the Arts, New York Foundation for the Arts.
