= Developing Lives =

Program in New York City

Developing Lives is a photography program run for residents of the New York City Housing Authority or NYCHA, a government agency that provides public housing for low and moderate residents throughout the five boroughs of New York City.

The program provides workshops by NYCHA using privately donated film cameras and laptops along with discounted film development. Private support of NYCHA programs is welcome given the agency experiencing huge shortfalls in operating and capital funding. The participants create a visual and oral history of daily life that differs from a common media portrayal of NYC housing projects. It may be that NYCHA hopes that Developing Lives can help change the image of those living in the projects.

== History ==
Developing Lives began in the Housing Authority’s Manhattanville Development in fall 2010 with a handful of participants. The program has by now included residents of 15 of the agency’s 334 developments. Meanwhile, over 10,000 viewers have seen the photographs online.

Developing Lives was brought to NYCHA by former MTA executive George Carrano of the non-profit Seeing For Ourselves, which also arranged the private partnerships behind the program. Carrano had served as curator of photography exhibits of war photojournalism and participatory photography that were lauded in the media as poignant and not to be missed. Chelsea Davis, founder of two participatory arts programs and with family roots in NYC public housing, directs the program. Lily Randall, former art instructor in St. Louis public housing, also helped run Developing Lives.

== Developing Lives as photography ==
Developing Lives belongs to the school of participatory photography. This school turns the traditional photography paradigm on its head. Those whose normal role is limited to their function as objects of photography receive training to document their own lives. The movement originated in American efforts two decades ago to aid rural Chinese women, who had never used a camera, but now encompasses all efforts to take charge of one's own narrative using photography. Milestones include the NYC exhibit Unbroken by PhotoVoice, a group dedicated to this school of photography. George Carrano served as the show’s curator.

== Program ==
Developing Lives includes weekly sessions in which instructors present a new photography technique (light, shadow, camera language, etc.) and introduce a well-known photographer whose work exemplifies that technical style. The program distributes single-use Kodak cameras at the start of every class which are returned the following week. The film is then processed and photographs reviewed and returned. Participants are asked to bear in mind the new photography technique when documenting their lives throughout the week.

In addition to teaching technical skills, Developing Lives also helps participants become documentary photographers. The classes discuss the art of storytelling through a photograph. All photographs are paired with handwritten captions from the photographer.

The Developing Lives photographs were combined with a narrative explaining the challenges faced by residents, and published as Project Lives in April 2015.
