= Bitz (disambiguation) =

Bitz is a municipality of Baden-Württemberg, Germany.

Bitz may also refer to:

== People ==
- Hermann Bitz, a retired footballer from Germany.
- Bertrand Bitz, a singer from Switzerland.
- Byron Bitz, a former Canadian hockey player who acts a winger.
- Cecilia Bitz, American climatologist.
- Carl Bitz, Swiss diplomat and inventor.
- Konrad Bitz, bishop of Turku in Finland.
- Michael Bitz, German economist.
- Hein Bitz, German folk and street dancer.

== Other use ==
- A character in Bitz & Bob
