= Jon Peterson (artist) =

American artist (born 1945)

- Jon and Tanarat Peterson, Venice, 2015
- Born: 1945; Stillwater, Minnesota, US
- Died: March 4, 2020 (aged 74–75)
- Education: Otis Art Institute, University of Minnesota
- Known for: Participatory Art, sculpture, painting
- Awards: National Endowment for the Arts
- Website: Jon Peterson

Jon Peterson (1945 – March 4, 2020) was an American artist, most known for his "guerrilla sculpture" in the 1980s and his stylistically eclectic paintings in the 2000s. He was active in the emergence of Los Angeles's downtown art scene—partly captured in the 1982 documentary, Young Turks—as both an artist and real estate developer. His work has been commissioned by or exhibited at Los Angeles Contemporary Exhibitions (LACE), the San Diego Museum of Art, Washington Project for the Arts, Madison Museum of Contemporary Art, Houston Art Festival, Foundation for Art Resources, and the International Sculpture Conference. It has been discussed in Artforum, Art in America, ARTnews, Los Angeles Times, The Washington Post and The Village Voice, and recognized by the National Endowment of the Arts. Museum director and one-time Artforum critic Richard Armstrong wrote that his outdoor, urban "Bum Shelters" "neatly grafted function and relevance onto the sadly barren tree of public sculpture"; critic Peter Plagens called them "hand-made, subtly irregular riff[s] on Minimalism" that injected social consciousness into "erstwhile formalist work." Reviewers liken his painting practice in the 2000s to the "polymath"-model of Gerhard Richter, interchanging diverse styles and genres as a means to understanding the nature of painting itself. Peterson died March 4, 2020, at the age of 74, and is survived by his wife, Tanarat, and son, Raymond.

== Life and career ==
Peterson was born in 1945 in Stillwater, Minnesota. After graduating from the University of Minnesota with a degree in aeronautical engineering in 1968, he worked at General Dynamics, Lockheed and Rockwell, at one point designing helicopters. In 1972, in Los Angeles, he turned to art, eventually studying at Otis Art Institute (MFA, Painting, 1976), with Michael Asher, Miles Forst, Matsumi Kanemitsu and Charles White. In 1976, he rented a cheap ($75 per month for 2,500 square feet) downtown Los Angeles loft in a former garment factory between Skid Row and Little Tokyo, and helped to jumpstart what Peter Plagens called a "scruffily energetic artists’ milieu," documented in Steven Seemayer’s film, "Young Turks." Some Los Angeles writers credit Peterson, Michael Tansey and Seemayer with pioneering the development of the downtown arts district—including the emergence of LACE—after they began renting and subdividing warehouse buildings and subleasing them as live-in studios to artists. In subsequent years, Peterson and Tansey developed several loft projects in the area, including the construction of a 74-unit complex and the 160-unit Little Tokyo complex.

Peterson exhibited actively after leaving Otis, in solo shows at the Newspace (Los Angeles, 1976–1979) and Protetch-McIntosh (Washington DC, 1980) galleries, and group shows at the Laguna Art Museum (1976), San Diego Museum of Art (1980), Houston Art Festival (1983), and LACE (1981, 1985), among others. In 1980, he attracted widespread attention and received a National Endowment of the Arts grant and commissions for a body of outdoor installations that came to be known as “Bum Shelters,” which he installed in New York City's Bowery, Santa Barbara, Washington DC, Madison, Los Angeles, and Houston between 1979 and 1983. In the 2000s, Peterson returned to painting, with exhibits at the LA Artcore and Andlab galleries in Los Angeles, Long Beach City College and SoPas Gallery in South Pasadena. He was represented by Rosamund Felsen Gallery.

In addition to his work as an artist, Peterson served on the boards of several Los Angeles art organizations, including Inner City Arts, LACE and LARABA (Los Angeles River Arts and Business Association) and was the President and founding member of Downtown Arts Development Association (DADA).

== Work ==
Peterson's early influences included Michael Asher's practice of Institutional Critique—which interrogated conventional art practices, often through temporary works, architectural interventions and performative gestures—and the guerrilla work of artists Maura Sheehan and Judith Simonian. Richard Armstrong described his early work, which included painting, sculpture and installation, as exploring field-situation and body-object relationships and "marked by a consistently cool temperament" toward the effect its non-conventional approaches produced. His later painting is characterized by a more personal exploration that liberally appropriates diverse historical styles and media imagery.

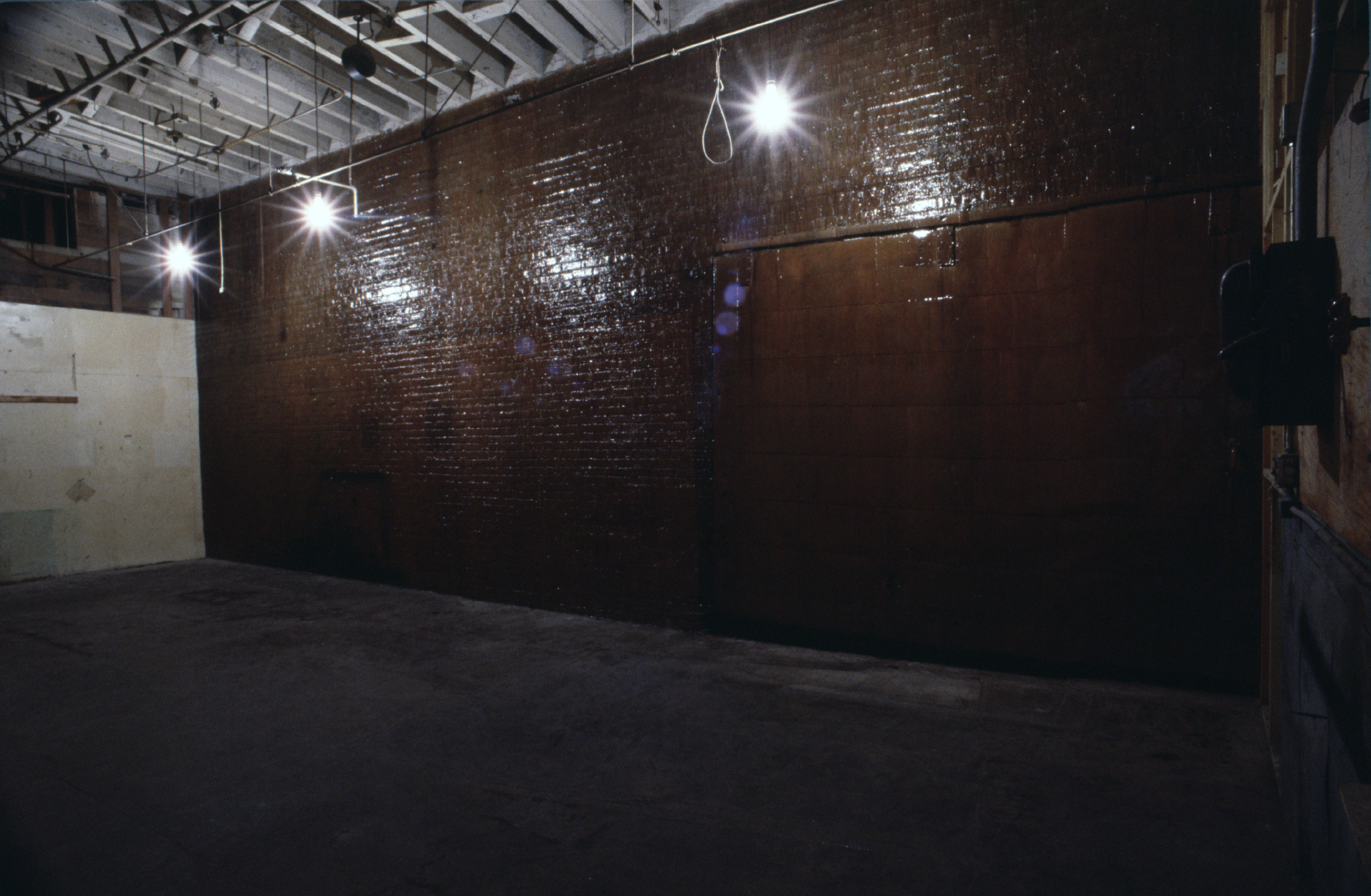
Jon Peterson, Off The Street, (Installation view), Los Angeles, 1985.

=== Early paintings and sculpture ===
Peterson began as a painter, creating translucent, abstract, grid-based works on large sheets of vellum, as well as site-specific work spray-painted directly on gallery walls. His "Negentropic Spaces" series (1976) used layered vellum sheets with strings and paint sandwiched between; they alternated between flatness and illusionism and recalled the graphs and structural plans of his engineering background. His "Wall Paintings" (1978–82) were dark, atmospheric and mysterious, like backgrounds of Old Masters paintings with affinities to the art of Barnett Newman and Mark Rothko. This work subverted notions of the art object by eschewing foregrounds and embracing a fluid relationship dependent on chance and improvisation, in which what happened in front of the piece became its subject. Concurrent to his painting, Peterson created lattice- or airframe-like, brightly colored wood-and-wax sculptures that were architecturally inspired and echoed the grid paintings. Critics suggest that as their scale increased to human proportions, the geometric, cage-like structures suggested absent bodies and enclosure, presaging his "Bum Shelters", as did the wall paintings' blurring of subject and object.

Peterson's "Symbol Paintings" (1983) explored representation and perception and the play of object versus content. Critic Hunter Drohojowska described them as "startling canvasses [of] lovely encaustic, carefully rendered, highly charged symbols: cross, red cross, Star of David and swastika"; they were shown only once, at LACE's "Emblem" show in 1984, where they were removed from the wall and turned around by an offended viewer at the opening. From 1989 to 1994, Peterson created a series of monumental, monochromatic abstract paintings inspired by the landscapes of J .M. W. Turner. Painted in stark, black and white-pigmented beeswax, the works have been described as transmitting a hazy, dreamlike quality situated between figuration and abstraction and the imaginary and real, reminiscent of Clyfford Still's biomorphic work.

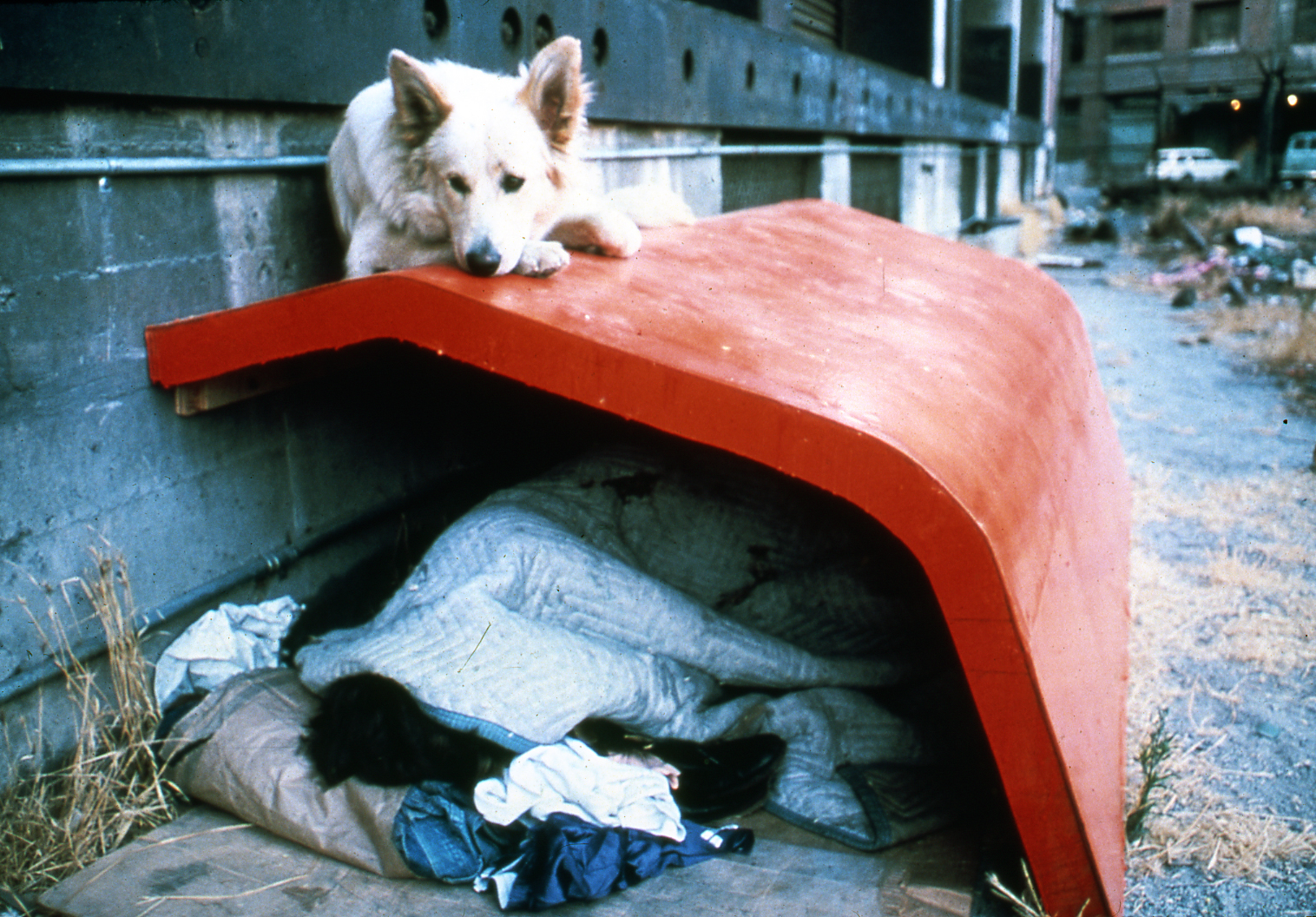
Jon Peterson, Los Angeles Shelter #4, Downtown Los Angeles, 1980

=== "Bum Shelters" (1979–1983) ===
Inspired by the guerrilla interventions of other artists, frequent interactions with the homeless population outside his studio, and the idea of "accidental discovery of an artwork," Peterson began constructing plywood, masonite and fiberglass sculptures that might also be used as single-body shelters (e.g., Los Angeles Shelter #4, 1980). He placed the works—which other artists dubbed "Bum Shelters"—in vacant lots and alleys and under bridges of urban areas frequented by the homeless and street populations, anticipating later artist interventions by Krzysztof Wodiczko and Michael Rakowitz. Portable and playfully painted in bright primary colors, they took diverse forms: flattened tubes, a triangular plane with two splayed legs, a small igloo, a curved lean-to, a long wedge supported by converging chain link fences, and tents designed be inflated by subway and underground exhaust grates. In formal terms, critics called them minimal, graceful and interesting; Thomas McEvilley described a Houston Arts Festival-commissioned installation as "an elegant and inviting little structure covered with mirrored rectangles to echo the mirrored style of the emerging skyline."

Reviewers made equal note of the work's conceptual and social implications. Richard Ross, in one of the earliest uses of the term, described in situ works by Peterson, Sheehan and Simonian as "participatory art" that bore "responsibility to the community." Village Voice critic Carrie Rickey observed that the work's blending of architecture and landscape—like that era's “site constructions”—expanded sculpture into the realm of the practical and gave something back, rather than merely appropriating urban suffering. Peter Clothier noted the shelters' transcendence of social barriers, existing as art objects in an (abstract) art tradition and as an "'offering' to a public that would otherwise have spurned the work as irrelevant to their world." Peterson explained, "The site alters the art. Put it in a gallery, and it looks expensive—like a work of art. Put it on skid row, and it becomes a throwaway—yet it is only there that the work is truly useful."

Artforum called Peterson's approach to exhibition, ownership and financing iconoclastic; he exhibited unused structures that were not for sale, models for proposed shelters, and clinically shot, for-sale photographic editions documenting the installation, occupation and use of prior shelters in order to finance the work. However, as Constance Mallinson wrote, ultimate ownership was, “dictated entirely by the ecology of the street—with no attempts at upkeep or replacement—their impermanence underscoring the fragility of life and dystopian dimensions of modern cities." When politicians began considering the shelters as potential solutions to the homeless issue rather than provocations questioning the social order, Peterson decided the work had run its course.

=== Later painting series ===
After focusing largely on family and a health crisis for several years, Peterson returned to painting in 2006 with a new approach. This later work spurns the modernist fixation on a signature style or brand in favor of personal exploration, spontaneity and stylistic heterogeneity. Peterson initially produced direct, naturalistic domestic images and portraits, whose centrally located figures were often based on appropriated images (including mug shots and street fashion images) and influenced by the paintings of Marlene Dumas and Luc Tuymans. However, with the Africa series (2008–16), his paintings became more semi-abstract, multi-hued and hallucinatory, with Vuillard- and Bonnard-like landscapes and politically inspired canvasses drawn from newspaper photos (e.g., the Arab Spring- and movie-inspired The Battle of Algiers works) depicting featureless, phantasmagorical figures in disorienting patterned and expressionist environments, as in Springtime (2011).

In 2011, Peterson began the "Via Phyllis" series, based on a portfolio of naïve drawings dated from the 1940s to the 1980s by a woman named "Phyllis T." that he purchased at a flea market. He translates her drawings (of celebrities, friends, dolls) into expressionist images that range from humorous to haunting, freakish or surreal, freely mixing a modernist repertoire of geometric shapes, color field bands, and gestural brushwork. Constance Mallinson describes these enigmatic works as "assisted readymades" that "provoke a tension between Modernism’s grand narratives and the personal idealism and quirky visions of the 'other' as denoted by this young woman."

Peterson's "Ellsworth Kelly Series" (2012–8)—inspired by a photograph of artist Ellsworth Kelly standing next to a messy, paint-daubed wall in his studio—features works that emulate the markings on Kelly's wall as a stand-in for painters and painting itself and sometimes resemble Calder’s hanging mobiles or Miró’s abstractions. These markings evolved into the more abstract "Map Paintings" (2017– ), which return to the grids of Peterson's early work; in these, he imposed what appear as mesh-like architectural structures or street plans juxtaposed with faint human figures through washes, gestural marks, wax lines and vivid thick paint overlaid on concrete-colored grounds.
