= Judith Simonian =

American painter

- Born: Los Angeles, California, United States
- Education: California State University, Northridge
- Known for: Painting, public art
- Awards: John S. Guggenheim Fellowship, Adolph and Esther Gottlieb Foundation, National Endowment for the Arts, BRIC Colene Brown Art Prize
- Website: Judith Simonian

Judith Simonian is an American artist known for her montage-like paintings and early urban public art. She began her career as a significant participant in an emergent 1980s downtown Los Angeles art scene that spawned street art and performances, galleries and institutions such as Los Angeles Contemporary Exhibitions (LACE) and Los Angeles Institute of Contemporary Art (LAICA), before moving to New York City in 1985.

Judith Simonian, Ferry Boat, acrylic on canvas, 58" x 72", 2018.

In her first decade of work, Simonian created site-specific installations and public projects for MoMA PS1, Washington Project for the Arts (WPA) and Creative Time, among others, that intervened in or transformed deteriorating urban sites. Through that work's emphasis on strategies of juxtaposition and disjuncture, she developed a language that has informed her work for three decades after a shift to painting. Artcritical's Deborah Garwood describes Simonian’s paintings as intuitive works which "knit luscious pictorial fields that tease cognition and the senses" and suggest the mind's "contradictory resilience and fallibility" in grasping contemporary existence.

Simonian has exhibited paintings and mixed-media works internationally, in numerous gallery shows, and at The New Museum, San Francisco Museum of Art, and Newport Harbor Art Museum (now Orange County Museum of Art/OCMA). She has received a Guggenheim Fellowship, Gottlieb Foundation grants, and National Endowment for the Arts awards; her art belongs to institutions such as the Hammer Museum, Museum of Contemporary Art, San Diego, OCMA, Broad Art Foundation, and Fresno Art Museum. She lives and works in the East Village in Manhattan and teaches at The Cooper Union.

== Early life and career ==
Simonian was born and raised in Los Angeles. She studied art at California State University, Northridge, earning BA (1967) and MA (1974) degrees. Soon after graduating, she was invited to join Grandview Galleries, which became the early feminist art collective Double X; based in the Woman's Building in downtown Los Angeles, its members included Nancy Buchanan, Judy Chicago, Merion Estes, Barbara Smith and Faith Wilding.

Simonian divided her early work between site-specific, largely temporary (and sometimes guerilla) works and painting. She gained critical recognition for projects and commissions from the California Confederation of the Arts, Santa Barbara Museum of Art, Madison Art Center, WPA and MoMA PS1, and painting exhibitions at the Ovsey (Los Angeles), Rena Bransten (San Francisco), Leila Taghinia Milani and Jayne Baum (New York), and Peter Miller (Chicago) galleries. She was also featured in shows at the San Francisco Museum of Art and Fresno Art Museum, as well as the inaugural Newport Biennial (OCMA).

Since relocating to New York, Simonian has exhibited at The New Museum, the London Biennale (2000), Weatherspoon Art Museum, and in solo exhibitions at the Edward Thorp, John Davis and Janet Kurnatowski galleries (New York) and Kai Hilgerman Gallery (Berlin), among others. She has taught at The Cooper Union since 1995, in addition to several other institutions.

== Work and reception ==
Judith Simonian, Villa San Itta, site-specific installation, Hunters Point, Long Island City, NY, 1988 (back and front images).

Simonian has produced two seemingly divergent bodies of work—montage-like paintings that mix diverse imagery and styles and temporary street/public art projects. Both bodies are rooted in assemblage strategies and an intuitive working process that begins with recognizable elements, which she alters through addition, effacement or abstraction; they juxtapose disparate contexts to create formal and cognitive tension and enigmatic, almost archaeological narratives. The paintings depict shifting, dream-like spaces and objects that intrude on and dissolve into one another, while her outdoor works have places minimalist-art vocabularies in dialogue with street art.

=== Site-specific projects (1978–96) ===
Much of Simonian's early work (like her Los Angeles contemporaries, Maura Sheehan and Jon Peterson) centered on unpermitted, temporary works at graffitied, decaying urban spaces or public commissions. She transformed several sites by sandblasting, excavating or painting out selected areas in order to create unexpected juxtapositions and to provoke dialogue and alterations, often made in distinctly different visual vocabularies. She documented their evolution in photographs over time, discovering in the process a collage-like language that continues to inform her painting. For Modern Excavation (PS1, 1984), she sandblasted a grid-like checkerboard pattern through thick peeling layers of paint, excavating the history of the site's building. Her wall work for the WPA "Streetworks" show (1983) was painted on the ruin of a market torched during the 1968 riots; the Washington Post described it as a thoughtful, "beautiful and modest" piece of urban archaeology.

In other cases, Simonian added elements to sites. Her installation for Creative Time's "Art on The Beach" program, Villa San Itta (1988), featured a cast concrete Palladian façade suggesting an architectural ruin that surprised visitors by disguising and giving entry to portable toilets attached at the backside. Talkin' Trash (SculptureCenter commission, 1996, Long Island University) linked two trash cans at opposite sides of a main plaza with hidden, buried speaking tubes; New York Times critic Holland Cotter wrote that the "low-tech, radically anti-monumental" work rewarded visitors with an intimacy rare for public art.

=== Early painting ===
Simonian's early gallery work came full circle from outdoor wall paintings to paintings constructed like walls that share the archaeological, process-oriented concerns of her street work. Her "Reconstructions" were formed by piecing together retrieved chunks of drywall from previous, now-vandalized urban interventions, tile and other building materials; writers compare their reclaimed, painted surfaces to topographic relief maps. These works borrow from exotic and classical traditions, often depicting landscape and water subjects, including whirling vessels, fountains, waterfalls, whirlpools and streams (e.g., Pots at the Falls, 1982 or Fire of the Falls, 1983). Art in America's David Rubin and others highlight the imagery's abstraction and ambiguity, which encourages multiple symbolic readings suggesting female, orgasmic, life-giving, or uncontrollable forces in the self and universe.

Judith Simonian, Snow Cone, acrylic on canvas, 46" x 64", 2014.

After moving to New York in 1985, Simonian shifted toward more reflective, urban meditations that express feelings and observations—romance, decadence and shabbiness, modernist claustrophobia—about her environment rather than illustrate it. The paintings offer tactile, often aerial, views through what Suzanne Muchnic calls "a veil of mysticism," composed of hazy curtains of color, shafts of light, louvered blinds and ornate grillwork. They maintain Simonian's mixed-media approach, often using mosaic tiles to further dualities between interior and exterior (e.g., El Capitan), decorative and pictorial, and abstract and illusionistic; critics compare the effect to Mondrian’s transformation of natural imagery into patterns of squares and Bonnard's collapse of indoor and outdoor.

For a 1994 conceptual show at Ovsey Gallery, Simonian turned to the human figure. She recreated Balthus's controversial paintings of young girls on the flip sides of white panels with peepholes that she suspended several feet in front of mirrored walls; visitors peering through found the girls' faces replaced with their own, implicating them as voyeur and viewed object, fantasist and victim. Los Angeles Times critic Susan Kandel called it a deft reversal of gendered positions that upended critical commonplaces about the male gaze. In later series, Simonian drew on advertising, newspaper and snapshot images to piece together large-scale, fragmented portraits textured by washes and aggressive mark-making, that play individuality against a composite or fractured sense of selfhood.

=== Painting – 2000s ===
In the 2000s, Simonian returned to architectural sources, ranging from medieval dungeons and ancient arenas to cavernous nightclub and office spaces. Critics note this work for its mix of incongruous subjects and disparate styles, sense of light and space, and palpable atmosphere, captured efficiently in loose, shorthand-like brushwork, saturated watercolor washes and built up surfaces. Reviewing Simonian's suite of watercolor collages, "Chronic Civilization" (Janet Kurnatowski, 2006), Shane McAdams highlighted Red Coliseum for its foregrounded, gauzy paper strips opening like windows into vague space and its vertical swaths of wet scarlet and lavender, which he compared to Morris Louis "Veil" paintings. Deborah Garwood singled out the claustrophobic ambiance of Deep Purple Space for its dense play of gesture, stenciling, texture and shadow.

Judith Simonian, The Sky is Falling, acrylic on canvas, 48" x 64", 2018.

Writers contend that Simonian's later work ventures into more ambitious territory, broadly mixing imagery, styles and approaches in spatial conundrums that push pictorial space and cognition to near-collapse. In these paintings, she delves further into montage (literal and painted), knitting together abstract passages, still lifes, domestic interiors, structures and travel scenes with dissolving, shifting boundaries. For example, Mountain with Flags (2012), Ski Lift (2013) and Ferry Boat (2018) feature curtains of color slathered over idyllic landscapes punctured by breaks, holes, ruptures or collaged shards; Huffington Post suggests that the disjunctures of natural and man-made, sublime and banal invite uneasy thoughts about hubris and romantic idealism, spiritual tourism and ecological degradation.

In her 2015 show, '"Foreign Bodies," the painting Lounge Chairs (2014) demonstrates Simonian's simultaneously embodiment of abstraction and illusion; it evokes a humid environment of plant life and water through an economy of marks and swaths of color. The larger Snow Cone (2014) blends coherent space and spatial disruption, juxtaposing a central frosted cake wedge, a bright, rough-textured yellow background casting an optical-illusion shadow, and punning allusions to collage strategies ("slice," "layers"). Critics compare the contrasts of context and content of these image shards and pictures-within-a-picture to jump-cuts in film or dream imagery; Larry List writes that Simonian's "tough compositional and color decisions result in works with a rugged, feral beauty [that] escape the trap of any sort of conventional resolution."

== Awards and collections ==
Simonian has been recognized with a Guggenheim Foundation Fellowship (2014), BRIC Colene Brown Art Prize (2019), and grants from Tree of Life (2017), the Adolph and Esther Gottlieb Foundation (2006, 2000), National Endowment for the Arts (1990), and California Confederation of the Arts (CETA grant, 1978). She has been awarded residencies by the BAU Institute (Cassis, France), Museum of Fine Arts, Houston/Dora Maar House (Ménerbes, France), Yaddo, and MacDowell Colony, among others. Her work belongs to the public collections of the Hammer Museum, Broad Art Foundation, Fresno Art Museum, Laguna Art Museum, Madison Museum of Contemporary Art (MMoCA), Museum of Contemporary Art San Diego, OCMA, and several universities and corporations.
