= Hammerspace =

Instantly accessible storage area of unknown dimension

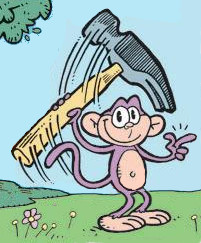
A cartoon character producing an object from nowhere – from "hammerspace"

Hammerspace (also known as malletspace) is an imaginary extradimensional and instantly accessible storage area, which is used to explain how characters from animation, comics, and video games can produce objects out of thin air. Typically, when multiple items are available, the desired item is available on the first try or within a handful of tries.

This phenomenon dates back to early Warner Bros.' Looney Tunes/Merrie Melodies and MGM cartoons produced during the Golden age of American animation. For example, in the 1943 Tex Avery short What's Buzzin' Buzzard?, a starving vulture prepares to cook his friend by pulling an entire kitchen's worth of appliances out of thin air.

== Origins ==
The phenomenon of a character producing plot-dependent items seemingly out of thin air dates back to the beginning of animated shorts during the golden age of American animation. Warner Bros. cartoon characters are particularly well known for often pulling all sorts of things—hammers, guns, disguises, matches, bombs, anvils, mallets—from behind their backs or just off-screen, but this phenomenon was mostly just left to suspension of disbelief. Only decades later was the term hammerspace jokingly coined to describe the phenomenon.

The term itself originates from a gag common in some anime and manga. A typical example would be when a male character would anger or otherwise offend a female character, who would proceed to produce, out of thin air, an over-sized wooden rice mallet (kine) and hit him on the head with it in an exaggerated manner. The strike would be purely for comic effect, and it would not have any long-lasting effects. The term was largely popularized first by fans of the 1978 series Urusei Yatsura and later by fans of Ranma ½ in the 1980s. It is believed by some that the term "hammerspace" itself was coined based on the Ranma ½ character Akane Tendo due to the fan perception that she has a tendency to produce large hammers from nowhere. In the original manga she more frequently uses her fists or objects that were pictured in the nearby scenery. The anime makes more use of hammers as a comedic tool than the manga.

Another series that may have contributed to the term is City Hunter. One of the lead characters in City Hunter, Kaori, makes extensive use of the "transdimensional hammers" as they are sometimes called, as they are one of the two main running gags in the series; the other is the extreme lecherousness of the other main character, Ryo, which almost invariably leads to the use of said hammers. The City Hunter hammers also require more explaining in terms of storage, as they are often considerably larger than the characters themselves, and thus more likely to provoke surprise. Starting in 1985, City Hunter predates Ranma ½ by two years, and already had an extensive fanbase.

Another series that made extensive use of hammerspace was Kodocha, where the mother of the main character would pull toy hammers of varying sizes to tap her daughter on the head to forge breaks in her ranting and offer a chance to glean understanding and wisdom. Trope-laden webcomic Okashina Okashi – Strange Candy also features hammerspace, this time named directly as such, accessible by the weapons nut Petra.

== See also ==
- Bag of holding
- Hat-trick (magic trick)
