= Photovoice =

Qualitative research method

Photovoice is a qualitative research method where photographs and narratives are gathered by community members to guide community actions. It is used in community-based participatory research such as community development, international development, public health, and education.

Participants are asked to express their point of view, or represent their community, by photographing anything significant related to the project's research themes. Common research themes include: community concerns, assets, social issues, and health barriers. The photographer then writes a narrative about how the picture relates to the project theme. Communities can then use this gathered research to guide the development of solutions and programs.

== Background ==
Photovoice was developed in 1992 by Caroline C. Wang of the University of Michigan and Mary Ann Burris, a program officer for women’s health at the Ford Foundation in Beijing, China. The method is based on the premise that images, combined with participant narratives, can be used to express community and individual needs, concerns, and priorities.

The approach draws on several intellectual traditions, including documentary photography, theories of empowerment, and feminist theory. It is also informed by participatory health education practices and the work of Paulo Freire, particularly his concept of critical consciousness as described in Pedagogy of the Oppressed. Wang and Burris noted that Freire emphasized the use of visual images as a means of encouraging critical reflection on social and political forces shaping everyday life, and that Photovoice extends this idea by enabling community members to create the images themselves.

Photovoice was first implemented with rural women in Yunnan Province, China, where it was used to inform government policies and programs affecting their lives. Since its initial application, the method has been adapted for use in a range of contexts and populations. Documented applications include work with refugees in San Diego seeking access to in-person medical interpretation services, homeless adults in Ann Arbor, Michigan, community health workers and teachers in rural South Africa, and individuals living with brain injury.

== Modern implementation ==
Photovoice has been adopted across disciplines, including public health, education, social work, and community development, and is frequently combined with other community-based and participatory action research methods. It is a qualitative approach used to address sensitive and complex issues, allowing individuals to share their perspectives. It is used to elicit and analyze data for knowledge dissemination and mobilization. The aim is to inform and support the creation of appropriate interventions and actions regarding complex problems, including health and well-being, social inequality, and socioeconomic disparity. The photovoice model has also been used in higher education to teach social work students. Photovoice has also been used to engage children and youth, providing them with an environment and opportunity to communicate concerns and coping strategies to policymakers and service providers. Overall, photovoice is used to investigate participants' lived experiences concerning systemic structures and social power relations and to communicate these experiences through a non-verbal medium.

A photovoice project should aim to:

1. Empower individuals to document and reflect on community assets and concerns;
2. Invite critical dialogue and create knowledge about community issues using photographs as a medium for group discussion;
3. Reach policymakers and stakeholders. Photos taken by participants serve as discussion tools and reference points, guiding conversations with researchers and other participants.

== Variants ==
Also known as "participatory photography" or "photo novella", photovoice is considered a subtype of "participatory visual methods" or picturevoice, including techniques such as photo-elicitation and digital storytelling. These techniques allow research participants to create visuals that capture their individual perspectives as part of the research process. An example is Project Lives, a participatory photography project used to create a new image of project housing dwellers, published in April 2015. Other related forms include paintvoice, stemming from the work of Michael Yonas, and comicvoice, which has been pioneered by John Baird's Create a Comic Project since 2008, as well as Michael Bitz's Comic Book Project (to a lesser extent).

== International development ==
In international research, photovoice is used to allow participants from the developing world to define how they want to be represented to the worldwide community. Participants are given control to tell their stories and perspectives and maintain a sense of authorship over their representations. This aims to convey what it means to live in a developing country to external audiences (e.g., funders and voters of the developed country) and those involved in international development (e.g., NGO and government agencies). Additionally, photovoice can be used by the community to monitor the impact of development programs. For example, photovoice has been used in Bangladesh to understand residents' traditional ecological knowledge of water in their urban environment and to document changes in attitude toward water and natural ecosystems over time. Subsequently, this can help inform external agencies about the process, impacts, and complex realities, complementing wider research and analysis to support development progress.

== Criticisms ==
Photovoice journalism faces criticisms related to ethics and researcher bias. Ethical concerns include maintaining participant privacy and confidentiality, obtaining truly informed consent, and avoiding misrepresentation or stigmatization of individuals and communities through published images.

Another challenge in photovoice journalism is the potential for researcher bias to influence objectivity. For example, facilitators might inadvertently guide discussions toward subjects they consider "research-worthy," or their unconscious biases could sway which photographs they highlight during public presentations. This can lead participants, especially if they lack confidence in formal settings, to self-censor or choose images they believe the researchers want, instead of those that hold greater personal meaning or present challenges to them.

== See also ==
- Participatory art
