= Double X (feminist art collective) =

Artist Collective

Double X was an American women's artist collective, active from 1975 to 1985 in Los Angeles, California, U.S.. Their aim was to expand the visibility of art made by women. Exhibitions held by Double X displayed work by their members and other established/emerging women artists. One can find many perspectives which are now considered to be the foundation of the feminist art movement within Double X's founding statement.

“We are committed to expanding the notion of what is considered art . . . .We recognize a pluralistic art that is both stylistically diverse and expressive of a variety of points of view in a framework such that although different modes may conflict with one another, they do not negate one another.”

== History ==
Double X has been left out of many history books, but many consider their legacy is 'incontournable'. Double X comprised members such as: Faith Wilding, Audrey Chan, Barbara McCullough, Micol Hebron, Nancy Youdelman, Merion Estes, Connie Jenkins, Carol Kaufman, Rachel Rosenthal, Nancy Buchanan, Jan Lester Martin, Nancy Webber, Marsia Alexander-Clarke, Vanalyne Green, Diane Calder, Mayde Herberg, Judith Simonian, Rachel Youdelman, and Vaughan Rachel.

In 2015, Chapman University's Guggenheim Gallery hosted "XX Redux: revisiting a feminist art collective," highlighted the work of many of the collective's members, and the exhibition itself reflected the continued absence of many women's voices from contemporary art galleries.
