= Double X =

Double X may refer to:

- Double X (album), a 2006 album by Bonfire
- Double X (feminist art collective)
- Double X: The Name of the Game, a 1992 British thriller film
- Doctor Double X, a DC Comics villain
- Double X, a musical group consisting of Alexander Kowalski and Torsten Litschko
- Double X, a nickname for baseball player Jimmie Foxx
- Slate magazine's women's-issues podcast The Waves, formerly titled The XX Factor then Double X (with its own website at DoubleX.com from 2009 to 2013)

== See also ==
- Dos Equis
- X (disambiguation)
- XX (disambiguation)
- Double X Posse, a 1990s rap group
- Jigarthanda DoubleX, a 2023 Indian action-drama film, sequel to the 2014 Jigarthanda
