= Barbara T. Smith =

American performance artist (born 1931)

- Born: 1931 (age 94–95); Pasadena, California, U.S.
- Education: Pomona College
- Occupation: artist
- Children: 3

Barbara Turner Smith (born 1931) is an American artist known for her performance art in the late 1960s, exploring themes of food, nurturing, the body, spirituality, and sexuality. Smith was part of the Feminist Movement in Southern California in the 1970s and has collaborated in her work with scientists and other artists. Her work has been widely exhibited and collected by major museums including the J. Paul Getty Museum, the Hammer Museum, MOCA, LACMA, and the Art Institute of Chicago.

== Early life and education ==
Barbara Turner Smith was born in Pasadena, California in 1931. She studied painting, art history and religion as an undergraduate at Pomona College, graduating in 1953. In 1965, after raising three children, she returned to study at Chouinard Art Institute, making The Black Glass Paintings, a series of primarily black surfaces under glass. She received her MFA from University of California, Irvine in 1971. During her time at UC Irvine, Smith and other artists such as Nancy Buchanan and Chris Burden founded F-Space, the experimental art gallery where she launched her career as a performance artist (this is also where Burden’s notorious Shoot (1971) was staged).

== Artworks and exhibitions ==
Tracking her transition from housewife to artist, Smith's early work focused on collaged photographs of herself and her three children, impressions of portions of her body, and articles of clothing into her self-published photocopied artist books, made on a Xerox 914 that she leased and kept in her dining room.

Titles like Broken Heart, Bond, and Do Not Tuch suggest the personal nature of her subject matter. As her marriage disintegrated in the late 1960s, autobiography and the creation of a community using interaction with her audience became central to Smith’s art. She began to explore themes of “the body, food, nurturing, female desire, heterosexual relationships, sexuality, religion, spiritual transformation, love, and death."

Smith is best known for her performance work in the late 1960s that was at the forefront of feminist, body, and performance art. Significant performances by Smith include: Ritual Meal (1969), a dinner party during which guests dressed in surgical scrubs ate with surgical instruments; Celebration of the Holy Squash (1971), a performance and exhibition centered on a devout belief in a miraculous giant squash; Feed Me (1973), a performance in which Smith invited solo audience members to spend time with her in a room accompanied by "food, wine, marijuana, and massage oil", while a looped recording played "feed me"; Birthdaze (1981), performed on Smith's 50th birthday, wherein she enacted her life story in relation to significant males in her life; and The 21st Century Odyssey (1991–1993), a collaboration between herself and UCLA professor and scientist Roy Walford, a Biospherian and (at the time) Smith's partner. During the performance, she traveled the world and transmitted her performances back to the Biosphere 2, where Walford lived at the time, and the Biospherians responded.

A retrospective exhibition of her work, "The 21st Century Odyssey Part II: The Performances of Barbara T. Smith" was shown at the Pomona College Museum of Art in 2005, and later traveled to the Kennedy Museum of Art at Ohio University. Smith's Trunk Piece, along with video footage from past performances, were a part of the Orange County Museum of Art's permanent collection exhibition "Art Since the 1960s: California Experiments" (July 15, 2007 – September 14, 2008). Her Field Piece (1968–1972) was the central work of a show at The Box gallery in Los Angeles (November 17, 2007 – January 5, 2008). Smith was the focus of an exhibition at the Getty Research Institute in 2024, title "Barbara T. Smith: The Way to Be." The GRI holds Smith's extensive archives, and published her memoir. The ICA LA mounted a major survey of her work, also in 2024, titled "Barbara T. Smith: Proof" (curated by Jenelle Porter), and published a catalogue.

== Teaching experience ==
In addition to her art practice, Smith has taught courses in performance, art history, sculpture, painting, and drawing at many institutions, including USC, Otis College of Art and Design, UCSD, UC Irvine, UCLA, San Francisco Art Institute, Illinois State University, Ohio State University, and Johnston College at the University of Redlands.

== Selected collections ==
- The J. Paul Getty Museum and the Getty Research Institute
- MOCA Los Angeles
- The Hammer Museum
- LACMA
- Pomona College Museum of Art
- The Art Institute of Chicago
- Frac des Pays de la Loire, Carquefou, France

== Awards ==
- Civitella Ranieri Visual Arts Fellowship in Umbria, Italy: 2014
- Durfee Foundation: 2005, 2009
- Women's Caucus for Art, Lifetime Achievement Award: 1999
- National Endowment for the Arts: 1973, 1974, 1979, 1985
- Women's Building Award, Vesta Award for Performance Art: 1983
