= Social practice =

Social practice is a theory within psychology that seeks to determine the link between practice and context within social situations. Emphasized as a commitment to change, social practice occurs in two forms: activity and inquiry. Most often applied within the context of human development, social practice involves knowledge production and the theorization and analysis of both institutional and intervention practices.

== Background in psychology ==
Through research, Sylvia Scribner sought to understand and create a decent life for all people regardless of geographical position, race, gender, and social class. Using anthropological field research and psychological experimentation, Scribner aimed to investigate human mental functioning and its formation through social practice in various societal and cultural settings. She therefore aimed to enact social reform and community development through an ethical orientation that accounts for the interaction of historical and societal conditions of different institutional settings with human social and mental functioning and development.

== As activity ==
Social practice involves engagement with communities of interest by creating a practitioner-community relationship with a focus on the skills, knowledge, and understanding of people in their private, family, community, and working lives. In this approach to social practice, activity is used for social change without the agenda of research. Activity theory suggests the use of a system of participants who work toward an object or goal that brings about some form of change or transformation in the community.

== As inquiry ==
Within research, social practice aims to integrate the individual with his or her surrounding environment while assessing how context and culture relate to common actions and practices of the individual. Just as social practice is an activity itself, inquiry focuses on how social activity occurs and identifies its main causes and outcomes. It has been argued that research be developed as a specific theory of social practice through which research purposes are defined not by philosophical paradigms but by researchers' commitments to specific forms of social action.

== Areas of interest ==
=== Education ===
In education, social practice refers to the use of adult-child interaction for observation in order to propose intentions and gauge the reactions of others. Under social practice, literacy is seen as a key dimension of community regeneration and a part of the wider lifelong learning agenda. In particular, literacy is considered to be an area of instruction for the introduction of social practice through social language and social identity. According to social practice in education, literacy and numeracy are complex capabilities rather than just a simple set of basic skills. Furthermore, adult learners are more likely to develop and retain knowledge, skills, and understanding if they see them as relevant to their own problems and challenges. Social practice perspectives focus on local literacies and how literacy practices are affected by settings and groups interacting around print.

=== Literature ===
As literature is repeatedly studied in education and critiqued in discourse, many believe that it should be regarded as a field of social practice because it evokes emotion and prompts discussion of social interactions and social conditions. Those who believe literature may be construed as a form of social practice argue that literature and society are essentially related to each other. As such, they attempt to define specific sociological practices of literature and share expressions of literature as works comprising text, institutions, and individuals. Overall, literature becomes a realm of social exchange through fiction, poetry, politics, and history.

=== Art ===
Social practice is also considered a medium for making art. Social practice art came about in response to increasing pressure within art education to work collaboratively through social and participatory formats from artists' desires and art viewers' increasing media sophistication. "Social practice art" is a term for artwork that uses social engagement as a primary medium, and is also referred to by a range of different names: socially engaged art, community art, new-genre public art, participatory art, interventionist art, and collaborative art.

Artists working in the medium of social practice develop projects by inviting collaboration with individuals, communities, institutions, or a combination of these, creating participatory art that exists both within and outside of the traditional gallery and museum system. Artists working in social practice art co-create their work with a specific audience or propose critical interventions within existing social systems that inspire debate or catalyze social exchange. Social practice art work focuses on the interaction between the audience, social systems, and the artist through topics such as aesthetics, ethics, collaboration, persona, media strategies, and social activism. The social interaction component inspires, drives, or, in some instances, completes the project. Although projects may incorporate traditional studio media, they are realized in a variety of visual or social forms (depending on variable contexts and participant demographics) such as performance, social activism, or mobilizing communities towards a common goal.
