= Red String (webcomic) =

Webcomic by Gina Biggs

- Red String Volume 1
- Author: Gina Biggs
- Website: http://redstring.strawberrycomics.com/
- Current status/schedule: Complete
- Launch date: 2002
- End date: 2013
- Genre(s): Romance, Manga

Red String is a webcomic series created by Gina Biggs. Starting in 2002, this story chronicles the daily life of a Japanese high school student, Miharu Ogawa who discovers one day that she is the victim of an arranged marriage. The series premise is based on the red string of fate of Japanese and Chinese mythology. It has a definite shōjo manga influence and is primarily a romance story. The first three volumes were published by Dark Horse Comics. As of August 2013, the series has been completed.

== Publication history ==
Red String was first printed in 2005 as a self-published work under Gina Biggs's all-female comic group, Strawberry Comics. On May 1, 2006, the author announced that Dark Horse Comics had licensed the title for publication. The first seven chapters of the series, mostly edited and touched up for print with Dark Horse Comics, were collected into Volume 1 and released on January 28, 2007. Volume 2 was released January 30, 2008, and collected chapters eight through fourteen. The third volume comprised chapters fifteen through twenty one and was released on May 8, 2008. No further volumes will be published by Dark Horse.

The series continues to be released online despite its completion. In addition, a full-color art book titled Threads was released by the author in 2006. Threads II, a follow-up artbook was released in early 2009 and is also self-published by the author.

There is also a radio play in production based on the comic. Crystal Miller of the Voice Acting Alliance initiated the project in September 2005, later passing the reins to Biggs. On November 7, 2006, the first chapter was released, and as of April 2008, three chapters and one supplement have been released.

The comic is a member of the Create a Comic Project.

As of the time of writing (October 2023) it is officially available at Strawberry Comics.

== Characters ==
=== Main teenage characters ===
Most of the comic focuses on the life of Miharu and her teenage friends.

- Miharu Ogawa (小川美晴, Ogawa Miharu) is the main character of Red String. She is a sixteen-year-old Japanese High School student with bleached-blond hair, is rather out-spoken and trendy, and is close friends with Reika and Fuuko. She is also betrothed to a stranger against her will, however she soon discovers that she and her fiancé have actually already met.
- Kazuo Fujiwara (藤原和男, Fujiwara Kazuo) is the male lead of Red String, he is Miharu's 19-year-old fiancé. His family has firm plans for his future which he feels trapped by. He does, however, have genuine affection for Miharu, as she does for him.
- Reika Matsuo (松暢鈴華, Matsuo Reika) is one of Miharu's two best friends, and Miharu and Reika have known each other since childhood. Miharu helped Reika through some tough times in middle school that left a mark on Reika's reputation (despite Reika's innocence in the matter). She had a crush on Hiroshi Aizaku and begins a relationship with him but she later finds out the playboy side of him and thus, their relationship ended. She later on realises her feelings for Eiji and they become a couple.
- Fuuko Akimoto (淳元風子, Akimoto Fūko) is Miharu's other best friend. She is also 16 years old, and though she only met Miharu and Reika when she began attending high school she was quickly accepted as part of the group. Her family moves often, usually due to her father's company reassigning him. She was a big fan of her school's volleyball team and was in love with Maya Chiaki, the team captain. She moves to Tokyo in Chapter 15. Side Story 2, which takes place between Chapters 16 and 27, reveals that she has joined her Tokyo school's film club and started dating Hanae Niijima, who returns her feelings.
- Eiji Hayashihara (林原栄二, Hayashihara Eiji) is a friend of Hiroshi's who is known as a "lone wolf" to most students. Initially, he does not seem to like Reika or Miharu very much, and demonstrates this with snide and piercing remarks and a rough attitude. However, he has been known to offer Miharu advice and he is a very responsible older brother. More recently he has begun to think of Miharu and Reika as friends, and a growing affection for Reika has undoubtedly been unfolding in Eiji. When Reika starts dating Aizaku, Eiji tries to talk her out of it because he knew Aizaku was cheating on her. This eventually led to a fight between him and Aizaku. Reika later on discovers Aizaku's playboy side, resulting their relationship to come to an end. Eiji and Reika get closer after the accident and they eventually become a couple when Reika returns her feelings for Eiji.

=== Secondary teenage characters ===
- Sayuri Morita (森田小百合, Morita Sayuri) is a girl in the same year as Miharu, Reika, and Fuuko. She is "the envy of all the girls in school and the desire of all the guys", and a top student to boot. However, she has a superiority complex and especially likes to pick on Miharu and her friends. Her popularity has waned somewhat lately as Maya Chiaki's has increased.
- Hiroshi Aizaku (藍作豊, Aizaku Hiroshi) is an attractive student in the same year as the girls. Reika has a crush on him, but he is oblivious to her feelings. He seems to be a generally nice guy, but has a bit of a womanizing streak. He is a member of the Astronomy Club, which Reika also joined to get closer to him. If he's not hanging out with one or more girls, he may be found chatting with Eiji Hayashihara. He eventually dates Reika, not because he likes her, but to steal the person that Eiji likes as he becomes more popular than himself. Although he was dating Reika, he was playing with other girls. Thus, leading to a fight between him and Eiji, following a breakup with Reika. Aizaku then finds out that he had hurt many people and apologizes to Reika and Eiji.
- Makoto Yosue (代居命, Yosue Makoto) is a year older than Miharu and her friends. Makoto claims that he is Miharu's fiancé, however his appearance was actually due to a mix-up between Miharu's parents and his own. However, he was still determined to court Miharu and take over her father's restaurant - Ogawa-ya - one day, even transferring schools to get closer to Miharu (to her dismay). However, after meeting Miharu on the roof after school one day to apologize for his actions during the summer, he tells her that he will start giving 'Miss Karen' his fullest attention.
- Karen Ogawa (小川可憐, Ogawa Karen) is Miharu's older cousin. She works in Ogawa-ya as a waitress and she seems rather cold. She has been manipulative where Miharu and Kazuo were concerned, and nearly caused lasting damage to their relationship. She had been affected by painful memories.
- Maya Chiaki (千穐魔夜, Chiaki Maya) is the 17-year-old captain of the school volleyball team and the team's ace. She is friends with Fuuko and Karen, and also enjoys karaoke. She's also confused about her sexuality. Her father is American, so she's only half-Japanese.
- Seiko Hoshikawa (星河星子, Hoshikawa Seiko) is the president of the Astronomy Club, of which Reika and Hiroshi are also members. 16-year-old Seiko loves the night sky, and aspires to be an astronomer. She (correctly) guesses that Reika is a member only because Hiroshi is and offers her some pearls of wisdom, telling her that her pictures of stars are actually quite good.
- Jun Mataichi (又一巡, Mataichi Jun) is a classmate of Karen. He and Karen love each other, but Karen's engagement with Makoto Yosue prevents them from being together.
- Yuuki Kiyoe (清衛雄貴, Kiyoe Yūki) is the captain of the school's baseball team. He likes Maya, and tried to support her when almost everyone else gave her the cold shoulder because of some rumors about a relation between her and Fuuko.
- Kikuko Miyauchi (宮内菊子, Miyauchi Kikuko) attends Harusono High School and becomes Miharu's friend. She is a high class and somewhat snobby girl who grew up with Kazuo. She dislikes Tomi.
- Genki Nagahara (永原ゲンキ, Nagahara Genki) attends Harusono University with Kazuo and works at Café Charm.
- Tomi Hisamori (Hisamori Tomi) attends Harusono High School and becomes Miharu's friend. She attends Harusono to try to get a rich husband because her family is poor. She dislikes Kikuko.

=== Parents ===
The teenagers' parents are seen and mentioned in Red String on occasion, but they are most often relegated to background characters and comic relief.

- Miharu's Parents: Miharu's parents run the family business Ogawa-ya, a restaurant and sushi bar. Her aunt, uncle, and cousin Karen work there too. Her father Ryou (小川遼, Ogawa Ryō) runs the business and cooks and her mother Kazuko (小川和子, Ogawa Kazuko) is the head hostess.
- Karen's Parents: Karen's parents are Miharu's Uncle Jiro (小川二郎, Ogawa Jirō), and Aunt Akina (小川明菜, Ogawa Akina). They work at Ogawa-ya as a chef and waitress, Jiro is the younger brother of Miharu's father and even though they aren't twins they look incredibly alike. You can tell them apart because Jiro has an ear-piercing and Miharu's father does not. Also, Miharu's dad wears glasses and Jiro does not.
- Kazuo's Parents: Kazuo's parents are Emi (藤原栄美, Fujiwara Emi) and Kenta (藤原堅多, Fujiwara Kenta). Kenta works in the Fujiwara family's pharmaceutical company, and is in fact in line to inherit leadership. Kenta and Emi married quickly after finding that Emi was pregnant with Kazuo, after a whirlwind romance between his parents.

=== Siblings ===
Some of the characters have siblings who also make an appearance.

- Kazuo's Sisters: Kazuo has two younger sisters, the elder of two is called Mika (藤原美香, Fujiwara Mika), and the younger is called Yumi (藤原友美, Fujiwara Yumi). When they first meet Miharu they get confused and mistake Karen for her. They are slightly disappointed when they see Miharu, but they do warm up to her.
- Eiji's Brothers: Eiji has a younger brother called Saburou (林原三郎, Hayashihara Saburō), and an elder brother called Ken'ichi (林原堅一, Hayashihara Ken'ichi). All three Hayashihara brothers are rather alike.
- Maya's Brother: Maya has an older brother called Minao (千穐皆雄, Chiaki Minao) who is a fashion designer. Like Maya he is half Japanese, half American.

== Chapters ==
No.	English release date	English ISBN
01	January 17, 2007	978-1-59307-624-5
Prologue; Supplement 1; Winter uniforms cannot mask a wounded heart!; The battle to find the perfect gift for my sweetheart.; The entangling of red strings.; Spring Vacation is a lot of work!; Cherry blossoms hail the new school year.; Beyond the surface.
When first-year high school student Miharu Ogawa gets a call from her parents, telling her to come straight home from school, she prepares herself for the worst. After all, the last time her quirky restaurateur parents told her to come straight home she ended up as a contestant on a kiddy game show! But nothing she could ever have imagined could have prepared her for their "great news"... Miharu is getting married! How's a spirited and independent teenager who has never even kissed a boy supposed to deal with suddenly having a fiancé she's never even met? And how will her feelings change when she finds out that there are other boys out there vying for her affection, and other girls ready and willing to take away the man she's not even sure she's ready for? With her family, friends, (and enemies!) to cope with, will Miharu even have the time to find out if the handsome, devoted Kazuo Fujiwara is really the man she is meant to be with, the man connected to her by the red string of destiny?
02	January 30, 2008	978-1-59307-884-3
The stars shine a little brighter.; The whims of fate, the wearing down of the red string.; Emotions are high. Adventure at Ueno Zoo!; Held together by a thread.; Supplement 2; Truth blowing in the summer wind.; Supplement 3; A feeling worth a thousand text messages.; Open wounds, tearing hearts.
Romantic high school student Miharu Ogawa believes that red strings of destiny tie lovers together forever, but a few hardened hearts around her feel that such bonds can be easily broken. Still struggling with the news of the arranged marriage that her parents lined up for her, Miharu begins to doubt her first instincts about Kazuo Fujiwara. After a rainy afternoon brings them together, Miharu finds that she has more in common with the salacious Makoto Yosue than she thought. Karen begins to vie for the heart of a boy who's promised to another, as memories of a past love torture her.
03	May 8, 2008	978-1-59307-958-1
I cannot go where my heart leads.; Bit by Bit.; Supplement 4; Lost without you...; Supplement 5; Breaking through to the inner you.; Resentment and resolutions.; Believing in lies.; Alone without you.
With a dear friend moving to Tokyo, an arranged marriage pending, and a difficult teacher holding a grudge against her, Miharu Ogawa is having one of her worst semesters in school ever! Her friends aren't having an easy time, either. After breaking down and finally expressing her feelings to Fuuko, Maya seeks solace and advice from Karen - who is not really an expert in love and is having her own relationship problems. "Lone Wolf" Hayashihara struggles with the fact that he's actually making friends, a new character – Jun Mataichi – arrives to stir up a little more confusion, and a snowy accident brings two bickering souls closer together.
04	May 15, 2009	978-0-615-28984-7
New paths lie before me.; Words resounding on my heart.; Side Story 1: Letting go of melancholy days.; The pain of a kiss.; Missed Chances.; Breaking Points.; Side Story 2: Starting over in Tokyo.
Miharu starts at her new school and makes two friends who are at odds with each other, Tomi and Kikuko. She struggles to start fitting into Kazuo's "world." Meanwhile, Reika tries to cope with losing Miharu at school. Aizaku finally notices her romantically, but it causes tension between him and Eiji. Fuuko and Maya move on from their old feelings for each other, and Fuuko begins to allow herself to open up to one of her new classmates, Hanae. Morita is beginning to feel the consequences of her behavior toward Maya.
05	December 21, 2009	978-0-615-33601-5
Holding on and letting go.; Supplement 6; Coming to Terms.; Can we change who we are?; Damaged Fate.; Removing Our Masks.; Harsh realities.; New Beginnings
Kazuo and Miharu celebrate Miharu's birthday. Kazuo's father argues with Kazuo's mother about the engagement, and Kazuo's mother reminisces about how she arranged Kazuo's engagement. Makoto returns home for his grandmother's funeral. Kazuo thinks about how he's going to tell Miharu about his father's wishes, but instead consummates his relationship with Miharu. Kazuo's father tells him that he cannot continue his engagement, and the next day, Kazuo breaks up with Miharu. Karen comforts Miharu. Eiji returns to school and is bullied by Mr Arata, who had previously taught Eiji's older brother. Miharu goes to Kazuo's school to try to talk to him, but he brushes her off. Makoto comforts Miharu, and then visits Kazuo for an explanation. To relax, Miharu, Reika and Tomi pamper themselves. Hanae and Fuuko are caught kissing by Hanae's mother, who tells Hanae that she should grow out of loving girls. Kikuko is approached by her parents about the possibility of marrying Kazuo, but she decides not to, and tells off Kazuo for dumping Miharu. Tomi is approached by a boy who offers her money to hang out with him, she is appalled. Makoto and Karen tell their parents that their engagement isn't working out. Mr Igarashi is concerned about Morita. Miharu and Makoto meet Kazuo in the park, and Kazuo explains why he can't marry Miharu. Makoto's parents buy the Ogawa-ya restaurant.
06	—	—
Anticipation; Friends no more.; Building new paths.; Closer.; The losing end.; Home is where the heart is.; Falling Hard
