= Okashina Okashi – Strange Candy =

Webcomic

Okashina Okashi - Strange Candy
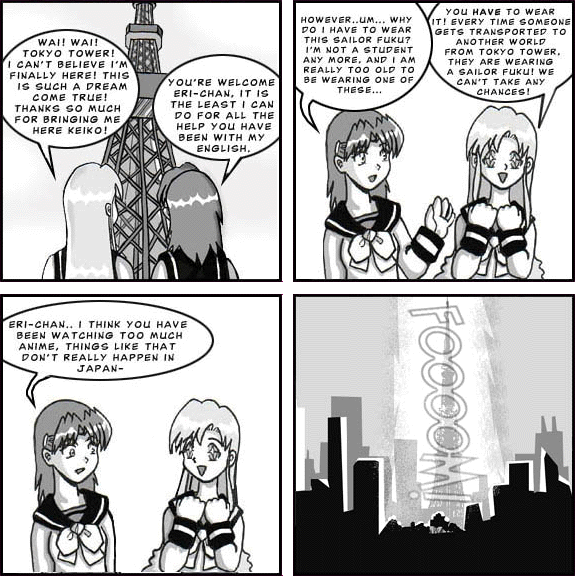
- The first comic.
- Author(s): Emily Snodgrass, J. Baird
- Website: http://www.strangecandy.net/
- Current status/schedule: Thursday
- Launch date: January 16, 2001
- End date: July 26, 2018
- Genre: Comedy / Romance / Fantasy / Sports / Science fiction / Magical girl / Ecchi
- Rating: PG13

Okashina Okashi – Strange Candy is a webcomic hosted on Comic Genesis, a free hosting provider for webcomics. It is drawn by Emily Snodgrass (Emi-chan) and written by Allison Brownlow (Tanzy), Karen Olympia (Kourin), and J. Baird (Xuanwu). It was started in 2001, with Brownlow as its first writer and Olympia added to the team in October 2001. Baird became the primary author in 2004. The comic celebrated its 1000th strip on April 11, 2013. The comic concluded on July 26, 2018, with a final pin-up on August 2.

Okashina Okashi is considered one of the three most important comics in the fields of education and public health — alongside Penny Arcade and Dinosaur Comics — for facilitating the development of art-based research methods and a variety of educational projects. Baird frequently uses the comics in his volunteer teaching exercises. This involvement began when Baird used the comic as part of his classroom exercises while teaching for Hess Educational Organization, an English education provider in the Republic of China and Singapore. Similarly, he used the comic again when he volunteered to teach the Create a Comic Project, a free after-school youth literacy library activity in New Haven, Connecticut. This work has garnered praise from Secretary of Education Arne Duncan and Pearson CEO Marjorie Scardino.

Both Snodgrass and Baird have appeared at conventions speaking at amateur artist panels and manga in education panels. Snodgrass is an amateur artist who does not make a living from her online strip.

In August 2007, Snodgrass branched out with a spin-off comic set in the Beauty Man Garden, a fictional chain of restaurants in Okashina Okashi. The comic was called Mini BMG. This attempt at another comic "fizzled pretty quickly" but Snodgrass hopes to relaunch it someday, hoping "to plan better and have more comics done."

== Plot ==
A group of strangers are sucked into the alternate universe of UberTokyo. They must try to find a way home by using plotholes to teleport between dimensional realms. Each realm is stated by characters to be a parody of a given genre of anime/manga or video games, such as sports, sentai, fantasy, and horror.

The comic archives are split into several distinct story arcs, called "Lands," each representing the world being visited in that arc. Known lands include:

- Amazon Land
- Shōjo Land
- Pr0n Land
- Space Drama Land
- Sports Land
- RPG Land
- Monster Bear Land
- Dream Land
- Mahou Shōjo Land

The lands are generally unrelated to each other, though some characters do appear in different lands (ex. a group of winged men from Space Drama Land playing as a Killer Croquet team in the Sports Land). Also, alternate universe versions of main characters, such as Yamichi and Minami, have appeared.

Recurring plot points in the series involve the Beauty Man Garden, a restaurant chain where all the waiters are bishounen and wear only extremely short aprons; a pair of cat boys, Spike and V, who monitor the group's progress from afar; and the schemes of Evil Overload Kerisu, the series' main antagonist, who wants the female main characters to serve as his groupies.

== See also ==
- Megatokyo
- Create a Comic Project
