= Michael Brewster (artist) =

American artist (1946-2016)

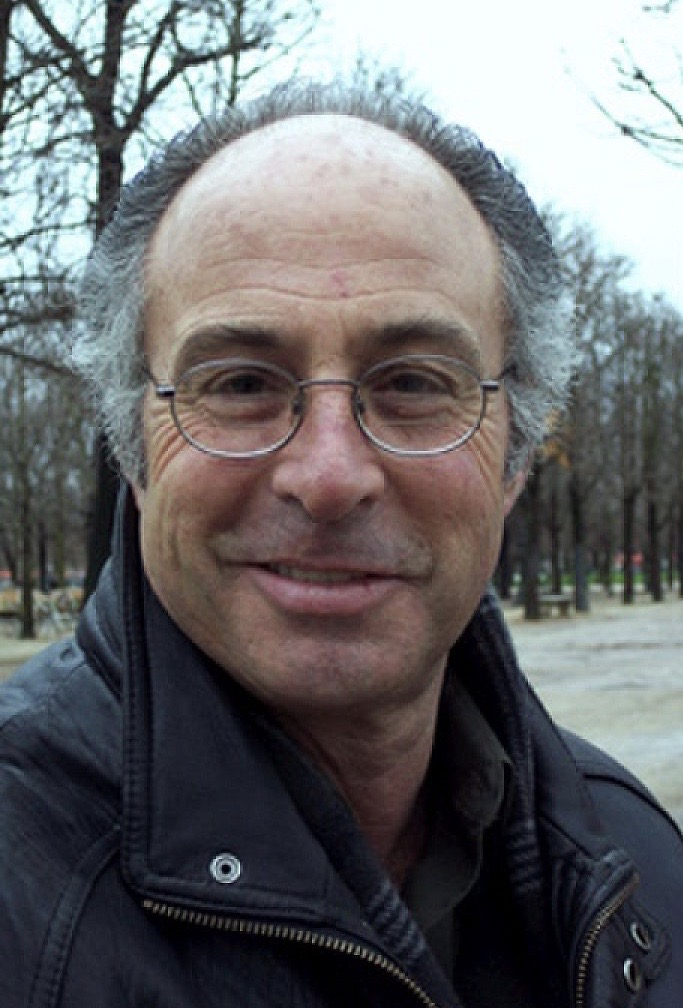
- Born: August 15, 1946; Eugene, Oregon, US
- Died: June 19, 2016 (aged 69); Los Angeles, California, US
- Education: Pomona College; Claremont Graduate University
- Known for: Acoustic Sculpture, Sonic Drawing
- Awards: J. S. Guggenheim Memorial Foundation, National Endowment for the Arts, Los Angeles Cultural Affairs Dept

Michael Leslie Brewster (August 15, 1946 – June 19, 2016) was an American artist, recognized for coining the term “acoustic sculpture.” He worked with sound to create sonic environments beginning in the 1970s until 2016. His works were shown across the United States and Europe, and are in permanent collections, notably the Solomon Guggenheim Museum, the Fondo per Arte Italiano, Museum of Contemporary Art Los Angeles, and the Giuseppe Panza Collection.

== Life ==
Brewster was born in Eugene, Oregon in 1946. He spent a majority of his youth in São Paulo, Brazil as an expatriate between 1950 and 1964. In high school, he became fluent in Portuguese and developed an interest in theater and set design. Brewster returned to the United States in 1964 to attend Pomona College, in Claremont, California. After graduating in 1968 with a B.A in Sculpture, he continued on to Claremont Graduate School (now Claremont Graduate University) to receive his M.F.A in 1970.

Brewster taught nontraditional sculpture at Bradley University in Peoria, Illinois. He moved back to the West Coast to instruct in sculpture and painting at La Verne and Pomona Colleges. In 1973, Brewster began teaching at Claremont Graduate University, where he remained for forty-one years, building the studio art program, chairing the department, and expanding the school's reputation nationally. He was awarded the first Roland Reiss Endowed Chair in Art.

Brewster died on June 19, 2016, at the age of 69.

== Artistic work ==
=== Lights ===
In the late 1960s, Brewster built a set of 25 light units he named “Flashers.” These were used in various outdoor installations in the Mojave Desert. Starting in the mid-1970s, he redesigned them to float in water, produced them in a larger quantity, and called them “Floating Flashers.” They were shown in the Grand Canal in Venice, Italy, Groningen, Holland, and Gumsluk Bay, Turkey.

=== Sound ===
Brewster explained his sonic sculptures: “My means is sound, especially its effects; but my issues are sculptural, not musical. Sculpture, in its most expanded sense, is the mode of experience that I find truest. I like to think about what an expanded sculptural experience could be: a full bodied bunch of sensation around being here, in the realm of the actual, the physical, in this multi-dimensional world. I’m trying to expand the sculptural experience by addressing, if not celebrating, our own existence as spatial, physical entities inhabiting all our dimensions. Sculpture should be a category of experience, not just a category of physical objects for us to stand back and behold.” Brewster's two major bodies of works are his Acoustic Sculptures and his Sonic Drawings. Brewster describes these works as follows:

"A typical Acoustic Sculpture is a mix of electronic tones emitted into a bare room by a single loudspeaker. The sounds echoing through each other produce a field of sound populated by places of differing loudness and tonal content. To see an Acoustic Sculpture, we must shift our sculpture viewing habits from the "stand and look" behavior to an exploratory "move and listen" approach; slowly walking our ears, instead of moving our eyes, through the elaborate spaces of "the room.”

“A Sonic Drawing uses devices that emit sounds at intervals. This work relies on the coincidence of intervals to draw ‘holes’ in the activity, producing moments when, through a union of all elements, nothing happens."

Brewster conceived of Sonic Drawings in the late 1960s while attending Pomona College in Claremont. He debuted them for his Master of Fine Arts Exhibition in 1969. This body of work has two forms: “Clickers” and “Whistlers.” Clickers are hidden in the gallery walls while Whistlers are visible, and require the gallery visitor to activate them. The Clickers were exhibited in New York, Dallas, and were collected by Helene Winer, Pomona College, and Merry Norris, among others.

The Acoustic Sculptures came from Brewster's study of sound waves. Learning about the phenomenon of standing waves in the early 1970s, Brewster constructed his first Acoustic Sculpture Fixed Frequency at F Space (an artist-run space in Santa Ana) in 1971. Originally, these pieces used one single tone. However, during the 1980s and 1990s, they became more complex. They began using multiple sounds and activation switches that give someone the ability to activate the piece thus making them participatory. These pieces generated scholarship by the sound theorist Brandon LaBelle and are in the permanent collection of the MOCA LA and The Guggenheim in New York.

== Selected exhibitions ==
Throughout his career, his work was exhibited at Artists Space, New York; Galleria del Cavallino, Venice, Italy; the Marum Overpass- Kw IX A, Groningen, the Netherlands; MoMA PS1, New York; San Francisco Art Institute and the Southern California Institute of Architecture (SCI-Arc).

Michael Brewster participated in the 1981 Biennial at the Whitney Museum of American Art in New York. That same year, he was a part of Art in Los Angeles: The Museum as Site, Sixteen Projects at the Los Angeles County Museum of Art. The following year, he collaborated with Mowry Baden at the outdoor exhibition, Artpark, in Lewiston, New York. In 1985, he was a part of New Music America, at The Museum of Contemporary Art, Los Angeles; and COLA, at Barnsdall Municipal Gallery, Los Angeles in 1998. In 2002, “‘See Hear Now:’ a sonic drawing and five acoustic sculptures,” a retrospective exhibition of Brewster’s work was shown at Los Angeles Contemporary Exhibitions, and in 2012, he participated in “It Happened at Pomona Part 3: Pacific Standard Time”, sponsored by the Getty Foundation at Pomona College Museum of Art, Claremont, CA.

== Public collections ==
Brewster's work is held in permanent public and private collections worldwide, including the Solomon R. Guggenheim Museum, New York; Fondo per l' Ambiente Italiano, Varese, Italy; Museum of Contemporary Art, Los Angeles, California; Orange County Art Museum, Newport Beach, California; San Diego Museum of Contemporary Art, La Jolla, California; University Gallery, Amherst, Massachusetts.

== Recognition ==
In April 1988, Brewster was awarded the J. S. Guggenheim Memorial Foundation Fellowship. He was the recipient of the National Endowment for the Arts, Artist's Fellowship Grant in the years 1976, 1978, 1984, and 1990. In 1996, Brewster received an Individual Artists Grant from the Los Angeles Cultural Affairs Department.
