= Bertrand Bitz =

- Born: Bertrand Bitz; 2 March 1978 (age 48); Nax, Switzerland
- Genres: Pop
- Occupation: Musician
- Instruments: Vocals, guitar
- Years active: 2003–present
- Label: Le chant laboureur

Bertrand Bitz is a Swiss singer and songwriter, born on 2 March 1978 in Nax (Valais).

== Biography ==
Bertrand Bitz's early musical education is quite eclectic. In his childhood, he studied solfege and played a brass instrument in the music school of his village band, l'Écho du Mont-Noble. Then he began to practice the organ and the guitar and gradually developed a specific taste for songwriting and interpretation of his self-written songs.
The songs of Bertrand Bitz address a lot of themes, from social subjects (consumerism, unemployment) to philosophical interrogations (friendship, passion-love, death, separation). For example, the song Pour combien appears as an uncompromising condemnation of capitalist consumerism which tends to change love into a simple economic good. Bertrand Bitz also possesses a distinctive style. In his songs, lyrics are always in the foreground and are subtly underlined by a musical accompaniment made of uncluttered lines.

In 2003, at this time singer of Hillside, a Swiss pop-rock group based in Sierre, Bitz released the album entitled Instants volés (Stolen instants). The same year his artistic life was transformed by the meeting of Ludovic Pannatier, a lyrics writer.

In 2005, Bitz, under his own name, released a second album, Tout ça nous poursuit (All that is pursuing us), with the collaboration of Ludovic Pannatier and Alexandra Bitz. Included in this album, the song Lorsque nos yeux (When our eyes) won 4th prize at MyCokeMusic.ch contest in Zürich.

In 2007, he won second prize at the famous Swiss singing contest "La médaille d'or de la chanson" in Saignelégier. There he sang En Thalasso. Among previous winners of this prestigious competition are Le bel Hubert (1981) or L'Homme Hareng Nu (2007), also known as Laurent Steulet.

On 1 February 2008 Bertrand Bitz was one of Manuel Maury's guests in the prime time TV show "Têtes en l'air" broadcast on Swiss French TV network (TSR). In April 2008, Bertrand Bitz released his first album aimed at a national diffusion : Multifaces. He also began to work with the manager Jacques S. who is the agent, in particular, of Sarclo. On 1 April 2008 he was received by Gérard Suter in the program "Radio Paradiso" broadcast on Swiss French radio network Radio suisse romande (RSR). On that occasion, Bitz revealed the backgrounds behind the conception of Multifaces. He said he had intended not to create songs too similar but songs reflecting different moments of life. Good moments, he says, inspire more popular, more joyful, songs. Bad moments such as death, sorrow, heartbreak or something else which may affect you, are translated into more tormented songs. Included in Multifaces, L'attente (The wait) is representative of the dinstinctive personal process of reflection which leads Bertrand Bitz to songwriting. In this case, L'attente develops Bertrand Bitz's reflection on the painful consequences of passion-love. "Seul face au silence, face à l'indifférence, l'attente est si longue et la souffrance si douce..." are the words Bertrand Bitz sings. From 4 to 6 April 2008 Bertrand Bitz gave the premiere of Multifaces at Interface theater in Sion.

== Discography ==
- Instants volés (2003)
1. Instants volés
2. N'écoute que toi
3. Mom
4. Silver
5. I can't stop

Editor: XYZ Records, Saint-Maurice

- Tout ça nous poursuit (2005)
1. Tout ça nous poursuit
2. Lorsque nos yeux
3. T'avouer vaincu

Also featuring in the album: Philippe Demont (guitar), Raphaël Gunti (guitar), Florian Alter (violin), Steve Margelisch (drum kit), Ludovic Pannatier (lyrics), Alexandra Bitz (lyrics), Florian Zermatten (music)
Editor: Gunt Productions, Sierre

- Multifaces (2008)
1. Multiface 1
2. Clara
3. Baisers volés
4. En Thalasso
5. Et pour combien
6. Lorsque nos yeux
7. Multiface 2
8. Au chômage
9. Indélébile
10. Laura
11. Mine de rien
12. En bruissements d'elle
13. L'attente
14. Multiface 3
15. Baisers volés final

Also featuring in the album: Sébastien Bessard (guitar), Benoît Schmid (piano), Gunt (guitar), Sam Amos and Gunt (drum kit), Céline Bugnon (choir)
Editor: Lugeon, Froideville
Website: http://www.bertrandbitz.ch/
