= Project Lives =

Collection of photographs of life in the New York public housing projects

- Author: George Carrano, Chelsea Davis, Jonathan Fisher
- Language: English
- Genre: Photo-book, Urban Studies
- Publisher: powerHouse Books
- Publication date: 2015
- Publication place: United States
- Pages: 136
- ISBN: 978-1-57687-737-1

Project Lives is a 2015 book whose theme lies at the intersection of photography and urban studies. Edited by George Carrano, Chelsea Davis, and Jonathan Fisher, the book is a collection of photographs depicting life in New York City public housing projects. The editorial team equipped and trained residents to take photos of their community.

The book's overarching purpose is to counter a negative media focus on crime, disrepair, and despair within the housing projects, with the goal of inspiring renewed government support for homes that house half a million New Yorkers. The book explores reasons for the decline in public housing projects and suggests the stakes involved in restoring what was once a proud civic achievement.

Reviewers praised Project Lives for its insights into life in public housing projects, for the striking dignity of the photographers and their subjects, and for the shattering of decades-old stereotypes.

All editor royalties are donated to NYCHA (New York City Housing Authority) resident programs.

== Background ==
According to the book, Project Lives grew out of one of the largest participatory photography programs ever undertaken. The editors brought the program to the New York City Housing Authority in 2010 on behalf of the nonprofit Seeing for Ourselves. Participants were recruited from the projects, given single-use film cameras, and trained in a 12-week photography course. Davis said to CUNY-TV, "We talked a little bit about photography technique, such as light and shadow, or camera language, or composition. And we talked a little bit about the history of photography, and offered some inspirational photographers. And then the latter half was the photographers sharing their own work."

Cameras were donated by Kodak and computers by Dell Computers. Film was processed at cost by Duggal Visual Solutions.

The program began in West Harlem in fall 2010 with 15 participants and grew to 16 projects and hundreds of residents by its conclusion in spring 2013.

== Photographers ==
The work of 42 different photographers are featured in the Project Lives book, mostly children, preteens, and seniors who have lived in the housing projects for a long time. Marcia Morales, Jared Wellington, Gertrude Livingston, and Aaliyah Colon are four resident photographers who provide their first-person accounts in the book.

Znya Mourning was interviewed by WPIX11 on April 10, 2015, and both Mourning and Margaret Wells were interviewed on National Public Radio on July 23. On NPR, the photographers spoke about what it's like to live in the projects and be viewed through a distorted lens. "There's still a normalcy about what's going on," said Wells. Added Mourning: "Everybody sees the word 'project' in a different way. I see it as a place where I live. I don't see it in a negative aspect."

== Photographs ==
The book includes 84 full-color photographs: inside and exterior views, resident portraits, still lifes, and landscapes. There are no photographs of crime, disrepair, or other negative aspects. The editors said they advised participants to photograph what was important to them. The total absence of photos of stopped-up toilets, bullet casings, and their like was a delight to the editors. Said Carrano, "They place a higher value on their sense of community, their sense of sharing with their neighbors than complaining about disrepair. It's humbling." Fisher noted, "If I lived in the projects I might be focusing on something else."

== Editors and book origins ==
Carrano, Davis, and Fisher describe themselves as native New Yorkers. Carrano brought the Project Lives program to the housing authority on behalf of his Seeing for Ourselves nonprofit. Courses for the residents were taught by Davis and the book's text was written by Carrano and Fisher.

Carrano and Davis had extensive experience in participatory photography prior to Project Lives. Carrano had curated exhibits of war photojournalism and participatory photography that The New York Times termed "poignant" and "required viewing." Davis took part in art enrichment programs at New York's Association for Metro Area Autistic Children and started a participatory photography program in the oncology ward at St. Louis Children's Hospital, a program that is ongoing. Video work created by Fisher and Davis for NYCHA won an award from the National Association of Government Communicators in 2014.

Carrano and Fisher's previous employment at New York's Metropolitan Transportation Authority helped inspire Project Lives. Said Carrano: "I started working for the New York City Transit Authority back in the ‘70s and the garage where I was working in is directly across from the street from the Manhattanville Houses, which is a very large housing project in Harlem built in the late ‘60s. So I used to walk through there on the way to work and I never felt threatened, never felt uncomfortable. It was just another New York community."

== Composition and publication ==
The book begins by describing the Project Lives program and then widens to situate housing projects within the larger context of today's affordable housing crisis. The next section focuses on the stakes involved in refunding the housing projects. The destruction of the Pruitt-Igoe public housing complex in St. Louis is brought up many times as a dire example of the potential consequences for New York City's housing projects.

The narrative touches on specific photographs only briefly, leaving it to the photographers to have their say about what they have depicted. On the book jacket is a tribute by John T. Hill, a former director of graduate studies in photography at Yale University and the author of Walker Evans: The Hungry Eye, who likens Project Lives to the seminal work of Jacob Riis.

The book was published by powerHouse Books on April 7, 2015.

== Website ==
The book website contains background information, sample photographs, links to social media, a blog, and more.

== Reception ==
By July 2015, Project Lives had been featured or reviewed by approximately 24 local, national, and international media outlets. Because media coverage included extensive selections from the photography collection, the photos ended up being viewed many orders of magnitude more times than the number who read the book alone. All media coverage was positive, with most featuring interviews with the editors and questions about how the program began, what the workshops were like, and what the editors hoped to achieve.

The New York Times noted that "Most New Yorkers know what public housing looks like from the outside, but a bracingly simple compilation of pictures takes us into the interiors of the buildings and thus into the residents' startlingly ordinary lives." Noting the book's focus on Pruitt-Igoe, Politico Magazine advised that NYCHA's ability to make a comeback will have a crucial bearing on the shape of the country's future safety net.

BuzzFeed enthused: "Beautiful…an unprecedented and intimate look into the lives of New York City public housing residents." The New York Daily News and Time described Project Lives straightforwardly. Slate's Behold blog summed up: "By presenting this look at life in the projects, people in New York and beyond will see why they are worth funding and call for action."

The New York Review of Books featured a photograph from Project Lives to illustrate an essay on poverty. New York Magazine called Project Lives "A startlingly simple and optimistic portrait" of project life. The Long Island Press noted the large impact of the physically small volume.

National Public Radio's Leonard Lopate of WNYC interviewed Davis and photographers Wells and Mourning, calling the book fascinating. Refinery29 concluded, "An incredibly moving book." Apogee Photo Magazine, aCurator Magazine, and American Photo praised the book from the angle of photography. Dazed and We Heart, both of the UK, and Annabelle of Switzerland reviewed the book warmly.

On local TV, NY1 described Project Lives as a wonderful book. WPIX 11 commented: "Hundreds of participants…embraced the role of storyteller and took back the power from decades of stereotypes" and concluded, "A great story!" CUNY-TV praised the photographs as stunning.

Only Brooklyn Magazine raised a hint of criticism within an otherwise exhaustive and positive piece by asking about the appropriateness of disposable single-use film cameras and by suggesting issues with advocacy art in general.

The book website indicates a fan base that includes New York City First Lady Chirlane McCray, former US President Jimmy Carter, New York State Governor Andrew Cuomo, and US Supreme Court Justice Sonia Sotomayor.

In 2015, the book won the photography award at the New York Book Festival. The following year, Project Lives was a finalist in both the current events/social change and multicultural non-fiction categories at the Next Generation Indie Book Awards. Also in 2016, the book won the Montaigne Medal from the Eric Hoffer Awards as the year's most thought-provoking book.

== Portrayal of the housing authority ==
Although NYCHA's reaction to Project Lives is unknown, the program description remains on the NYCHA website. The book calls out agency missteps that have contributed to the negative media image surrounding the housing projects. Even so, the book defends the agency repeatedly, noting that it was all but guaranteed the agency would be unable to keep up once government funding was cut even as the infrastructure was aging.

The book indicates that while the agency's centralized command and control practice was outdated, plans were afoot in 2014 by a new administration to devolve more power to local building management. Project Lives also argues that, contrary to public outcry, the agency's delay in placing closed-circuit television cameras at Boulevard Houses did not set the stage for the notorious killing of a six-year-old resident in June 2014. Finally, the book's outlook on Bill de Blasio is clearly favorable, crediting the mayor with proposing safety enhancement measures, relieving NYCHA from the burden of paying for its own police protection, and raising the issue of economic inequality.

== Funding progress since publication ==
Shortly before Project Lives was published there were reports of moves by New York City and New York State to restart support of the housing projects Apparently the funding effort has not gone smoothly, with the state reportedly attempting to keep NYCHA from controlling its contribution and the city pushing back. The city comptroller, whose harshly critical views of NYCHA are recorded in Project Lives, continued issuing negative audits of the agency.

What impact this controversy has on the higher stakes of restoring federal funding is not known. Carrano said to the Long Island Press, "I would like to see the resident photographers who participated in this book have an opportunity to testify in Congress on hearings that focus on affordable housing. Sympathetic Congressmen could hold ad hoc hearings in the Rayburn building and bring together like-minded Congress-people to hear testimony of people living in public housing. That would be a valuable way to shine light on this issue."

== Exhibitions ==
Exhibitions of photographs featured in the book have taken place in the New York metropolitan area. Photographs were exhibited at the powerHouse Arena in DUMBO April 6 - 20, 2015 and Artspace Patchogue May 23 - June 10, 2015. An exhibit at the fotofoto Gallery in Huntington ran July 31 - August 29, 2015, and at the Art League of Long Island June 21 - August 22, 2016. Project Lives was also included in exhibitions about affordable New York City housing at the Museum of the City of New York, September 18, 2015 – February 7, 2016, and at the Hunter East Harlem Gallery, February 10 - May 15, 2016.
