= Hess Educational Organization =

- Named after: Karen Hess
- Formation: 1983
- Founder: Joseph Chu, Karen Hess
- Founded at: Taipei, Taiwan
- Purpose: English as a foreign language instruction
- Region served: Taiwan, Singapore, China, South Korea, Japan
- Members: 60,000 (students)
- Official language: English, Chinese

HESS International Educational Group (Traditional Chinese: 何嘉仁國際文教團隊; Pinyin: Héjiārén Wénjiào Jīgòu) is the single largest private provider of English education in Taiwan. Hess has an estimated 60,000 students enrolled. Founded in 1983 by Joseph Chu and Karen Hess, it has become a large business, with schools across the island. Hess also provides books and resources to other English schools across Asia to teach English as a foreign language, and has a chain of bookstores, which was founded in 1990. In addition to the ROC, Hess also has branches in Singapore, China, and South Korea as well as connections to Japan.

Hess hires native-speaking English teachers from countries where English is the primary language. As per Taiwan government law, these include the US, Canada, UK, Ireland, Australia, New Zealand, and South Africa. After one year of employment and completion of the full training program, Hess employees earn a TEFL certificate, but it is not affiliated with any outside official educational body.

All foreign teachers working for Hess are legally employed to work as Native-Speaking Teachers (NSTs) in the ROC, and Hess offers document-processing assistance to all its staff. Like most employers in Taiwan, Hess aids new teachers to join the national healthcare program and contributes part of the costs on a monthly basis.

== Core curriculum ==
The primary curriculum of Hess instruction is their ESL series, aimed at elementary school children. The ESL curriculum consists of 12 levels lasting six months each and is aimed at students from first grade to junior high school level.

For children in grades 1-2, there is the Kids World series (or "K series" for short), which has eight levels. At the junior high level, Hess has developed several curricula for further study. Hess has several adult learning courses through its International Studies Institute.

In addition to their EFL and Kids World series, Hess offers two English-environment series; Tree House and ESL. The Tree House series uses books written and published in-house. There are 12 levels, each six months long. Lower levels are divided into 9 themes and a Holiday Unit while the mid-levels have 6 themes and a Holiday Unit. The Tree House series uses 8 primary characters that interact, grow and change along with the children in the classes. The ESL series using a combination of in-house materials, such as the Tree House series, and materials written and published for Elementary schools in the US, such as the Macmillan-McGraw Hill Treasures series. These reading components comprise the core of the ESL program but modules such as Science, Art and Mathematics have also been incorporated. The schedule and focus of Hess' ESL program varies widely between areas and branches throughout the island.

Hess has several key books that comprise their EFL curriculum for students:

- Phonics – The first thing students learn. The KK method of noting phonetic sounds is used however emphasis is placed on learning spelling and deducing the pronunciation of letter combinations.
- Reading – Each of the 8 levels has 1-2 different reading books to introduce vocabulary and grammar, last 2 levels consist of 4 books each.
- Patterns – The book focuses on grammar, such as verb tenses, the making of questions (who, what, when, where, why, how), comparative and superlative adjectives, the passive voice, etc.
- Student Book/Modern English – contains activities and conversations that students use to review and practice their English.
- Homework - Two pre-printed homework books are provided for the lower and middle levels. Students fill in the homework and turn these books in to the teacher. Higher levels use standard notebooks and copy the homework out of their books.

The Tree House series comprises the following:

- Storybooks - There is a story for each theme. In the mid-levels each there are 2 books with three chapters each. Each chapter corresponds to a theme.
- Textbook - The textbook generally includes pages for the theme (a picture page), vocabulary and grammar, conversation comic, phonics, a phonics activity, phonics reading and the song. Stickers are provided in the back for grammar practice activities either using a dedicated picture-page for the stickers to be put on or using the theme page.
- Flashcards - students are issued a set of standard playing-card sized vocabulary flashcards for both individual review and for grammar practice written into the curriculum.
- Workbook - Pre-printed listening, grammar and vocabulary skills pages are provided for each lesson. The workbook follows the same structure the students will see in their homework books. The workbook also includes spelling pages, creative writing pages and reading practice and comprehension pages.
- Homework - Two pre-printed homework books are provided for the lower and middle levels. Students fill in the homework and turn these books in to the teacher. Higher levels use standard notebooks and copy the homework out of a provided Homework book.

Hess writes and produces its own curriculum, from books to audio CDs to props and artwork. Authors for Hess curriculum include teaching specialists, design specialists and current and former Hess teachers. Hess has published supplements to their primary curriculum, including storybooks for children, English learning CDs and DVDs, and activity books containing classroom games and projects.

Hess publishes secondary curriculum materials for use at other schools. However, the core books are exclusive to Hess schools. According to Hess, it has published more than 1,000 different titles, with 800,000 books used by students each year.

== Teacher recruitment, training, and organization ==
There are two primary types of teachers in Hess: Native-Speaking Teachers (NSTs) and Chinese Co-Teachers (CTs). There are also French and Japanese speaking teachers for Hess's other language programs. CTs are drawn primarily from Taiwan, with NSTs hailing from the foreign countries listed above. CTs and NSTs have separate training schedules and requirements.

Within each branch of a Hess school, NSTs are directly managed by the Head NST (HNST). HNSTs have to have six months of experience at teaching and undergo special management training. CTs are directly managed by a Head CT (HCT). Both the HNST and HCT answer to the school's branch manager. If a Hess Language School has an associated preschool, it may keep the positions of HNST and HCT for the two schools separate, though at some branches, the same person could work in both positions.

NSTs experience five training sessions: an introduction to Hess, 1-month training, 3-month training, 6-month training, and 9-month training. Each training session past the first focuses on an aspect of teaching, designed to help build on the NST's growing experience. After one year, if the NST has completed all the required training sessions, they earn a Hess TEFL. Each training session has a manual.

In addition to the required sessions, Hess conducts mandatory extra training for new material, such as when levels 13–16 were added to the Step Ahead curriculum.

=== Recruitment of native speaking teachers ===
Most of the native speaking teachers (NSTs) at Hess are recruited from abroad rather than from within Taiwan. This is often accomplished through the internet, an initiative primarily conducted by the Hess English Human Resources Department. While Americans and Canadians make up more than 50% of Hess teachers, a significant number of the NSTs are native speakers from South Africa. South African teachers are encouraged to teach using a North American accent. Teachers from the UK, Ireland, Australia, and New Zealand are encouraged to modify their accents as well.

NSTs who travel to Taiwan for Hess do so at their own expense and are responsible for all of their own start up costs. These costs vary but are usually in the range of three thousand US dollars. Costs new teachers should plan for include an apartment deposit, the first months rent, a scooter, and household appliances, among others.

Once past initial training, NSTs meet the branch manager where they will be working, the Alien Residence Certificate (ARC) is processed. The Taiwan immigration office holds the NSTs passport during this time and changes the visitor visa to an ARC. Taiwan residence visa requirements state that the holder of a canceled ARC has 14 days to leave the country upon termination of employment.

The Hess branch assists the NST with finding an apartment. It is possible for the NST to take a loan of 30,000 Taiwan dollars (about 900 US) from the school if they are willing to allow the school to hold their passport until this is paid back. Teachers are paid monthly by their branches.

For NSTs, there are an amount of unpaid hours spent with class preparation, documentation and grading in addition to the teaching hours, because teachers are reimbursed for contact (teaching) hours only. Three types of documentation must be filled in order for pay to be received: a class book that must be signed, a homework folder, and a sheet which must be filled in with the specific number of hours taught per class level. In addition, there is a timecard which validates that the instructor has shown up at least twenty minutes before the beginning of every class (for the purposes of class preparation).

The minimum hourly salary for North American native speakers is 680 Taiwan dollars an hour (or about US$21 per teaching hour), HESS also pays more for people with relevant experience or a teaching certificate and/or a TEFL certificate. NSTs are guaranteed a minimum of 20 hours per week. Due to changes in Taiwanese tax law regarding foreign workers, foreigners must pay 18% tax for the first 183 consecutive days of every tax year and 5% thereafter. Some of this is refunded by the government one year later.

=== Initial training ===
The offer of employment is dependent on successfully completing training.

Initial training is held in Taipei at Hess's corporate office. Initial training is held four times a year to coincide with the three-month terms that Hess schools cycle through: one in March, one in July, one in August, and the last in November. It is at these times that the largest groups of new hirings are brought together into a single "class" of trainees. Sometimes the groups are split in two if there are many new employees (for example, one group starting training in early August while another begins in mid-August). This is not a constant rule, however: in between the three-month cycles, there can be smaller groups of hired NSTs are given initial trainings that are much briefer, sometimes being as short as 4 days.

Training will introduce individuals to the materials that Hess teaches and to the teaching style that NSTs are expected to use. These styles include the four and five step methods, student-centered learning, and the use of activities and games to heighten student energy. All attendees are trained in both the language school curriculum as well as Hess Preschool (see below).

Every NST (and all other Hess Taiwanese staff) receives a "Personal Development Journal" at their initial training. The journal is used to keep a record of the training they received as well as any activities they may have participated in.

Hess will also try to impose a fee for breaking a one-year contract to recoup its training fees.

== Speech and writing competition ==
Every year, Hess conducts a Speech and Writing Competition for interested students across the ROC. Around 2,000 students enroll in this competition each year.

== International program ==
Hess sponsors trips around the world for students to visit English-speaking countries and become immersed in an English-speaking environment. These trips are in addition to the normal Hess curriculum.

The most common of these is the "Camp Confidence" summer camp that is held at the Hess school in Singapore. Each year, around 360 students (and several NSTs and CTs, acting as camp leaders) take part in these week-long camps, usually held in the summer and winter.

Hess has study abroad programs in the US, Canada, the UK, Australia and New Zealand, and these can last up to four weeks. Hess hosts trips to France and Japan for students engaged in learning French and Japanese.

== See also ==
- Create a Comic Project
