= Los Angeles Contemporary Exhibitions =

Arts exhibition space in California, US

Coordinates: 34.101370°N 118.331871°W

Located in Hollywood, Los Angeles Contemporary Exhibitions (LACE) is a nonprofit exhibition space and archive of the visual arts for the city of Los Angeles, California, United States, currently under the leadership of Sarah Russin.

== History ==
In the mid-1970s, artists began living in large, inexpensive lofts built into the empty warehouses of downtown Los Angeles. LACE was initially located in the same area on Broadway, later moving to an industrial neighborhood near the Los Angeles River, and finally to Hollywood.

Founded in 1978 by a group of thirteen artists and based upon principles of grassroots community organizing and social change, LACE committed from the start to presenting experimental works of art in all media, including the then-experimental media of performance art and video. In 1982, Joy Silverman was appointed the first executive director. LACE provided an early venue for artists like Laurie Anderson, Nancy Buchanan, Chris Burden, Gronk, Ishmael Houston-Jones, Mike Kelley, Martin Kersels, Linda Nishio, Paper Tiger TV, Adrian Piper, Judith Simonian, Johanna Went, David Wojnarowicz, Bruce and Norman Yonemoto, Margaret Tedesco, and Liz Young. The presence of performance art and video in major museums suggest that these experimental media are now part of the artistic canon and testifies to the success of LACE to promote these media to a wider audience.

Originally located in Downtown Los Angeles, LACE moved to Hollywood in 1994. LACE has partnered with various organizations like YMCA, the Los Angeles LGBT Center, My Friend's Place, and Woodbury University. LACE also partners with other organizations including the Getty Museum, the Fellows of Contemporary Art, the California Institute of the Arts, the California College of the Arts in Oakland, Washington University in St. Louis, Kent State University, Atlanta College of Art, and Contemporary Art Gallery in Vancouver, British Columbia.

In 1998, LACE inaugurated Contemporary Editions LA, a fine-art publishing venture featuring Los Angeles-based artists, with editions in its first year by Paul McCarthy, Martin Kersels, and Sharon Lockhart. The following year, space published three new editions by artists Kevin Appel, Evan Holloway, and James Welling. In 2002, LACE published Contemporary Editions by John Baldessari, Laura Owens, and Raymond Pettibon.

In 2005, LACE published new editions with artists Amy Adler, Jeff Burton, and the 2006 Whitney Biennial artist Monica Majoli.

== Selected exhibitions ==
- 1978: CETA Artists, group exhibition of work by Bill Fisher, Harry Gamboa, Jr., Robert Gil de Montes, Gronk, Richard Hyland, Joe Janusz, Marilyn Kemppanien, Ron Reeder, Alexandra Sauer, Barry Scharf and Nancy Youdelman
- 1999: Amy Adler Curates Joni Mitchell.
- 2000: Matt Mullican
- 2001: Michael Brewster
- 2002: "Democracy When? Activist Strategizing in Los Angeles"
- 2002: Marilyn Manson, The Golden Age of Grotesque
- 2003: Chris Burden
- 2004: Yvonne Rainer
- 2005: LACE partners with Nike to present the US premiere of "White Dunk," a touring exhibition featuring 26 Japanese artists.
- 2011: Cassils, Cuts: A Traditional Sculpture
- 2012: Steve Roden, Shells, Bells, Steps and Silences
- 2015: Rafa Esparza, i have never been here before
