= Merion Estes =

American painter (born 1938)

- Born: September 5, 1938 (age 87); Salt Lake City, Utah, US
- Awards: California Arts Commission Grant, 1980; CETA Grant, Art in Public Spaces, 1980; J. Paul Getty Trust Fund for the Visual Arts, Artist Fellowship, 1996; Joan Mitchell Foundation Grant, Residency: Santa Fe Art Institute, Santa Fe, New Mexico, 2007
- Website: merionestes.com

Merion Estes (born Salt Lake City, Utah on September 5, 1938) is a Los Angeles-based painter. She earned a B.F.A. at the University of New Mexico, in Albuquerque, and an M.F.A. at the University of Colorado, in Boulder. Estes was raised in San Diego from the age of four. She moved to Los Angeles in 1972 and first showed her work at the Woman's Building in Los Angeles. As a founding member of Grandview 1 & 2, she was involved in the beginnings of Los Angeles feminist art organizations including Womanspace, and the feminist arts group "Double X," along with artists Judy Chicago, Nancy Buchanan, Faith Wilding, and Nancy Youdelman. In 2014, Un-Natural, which was shown at the Los Angeles Municipal Art Gallery in Los Angeles and included Estes' work, was named one of the best shows in a non-profit institution in the United States by the International Association of Art Critics.

== Early career ==
From the 1970s through the 1980s, Estes was a pioneer in the Pattern and Decoration movement. Suzanne Muchnic wrote in the Los Angeles Times, "What's interesting about this art is that Estes pulls warm textures from slick materials and builds soft forms from hard-edge patterns…her real concerns are light, space and color transformation achieved by repetition and a rigid system."

Estes was featured in a five-year solo survey of her work at the Los Angeles Municipal Art Gallery, Barnsdall Park, in 1979, curated by Josine Ianco-Starrels. A group exhibition of the Double X group was presented the next year at Los Angeles Contemporary Exhibitions (L.A.C.E). Estes was also included in several exhibits of work by artists with studios in Downtown L.A., including the first exhibition at the ARCO Center Gallery in 1976.

== Later work ==
In 2005, Fisher Galleries at the University of Southern California (U. S. C.) organized Contemporary Soliloquies on the Natural World: Karen Carson, Merion Estes, Constance Mallinson, Margaret Nielsen, Takako Yamaguchi. The exhibition was curated by Max Schultz. Los Angeles Times art critic David Pagel wrote that Estes' paintings were a "dizzying collision of extravagantly patterned fabrics onto which the artist has splashed, sprayed and stained various mixtures of oil and acrylic." He cited the "funky verve of her collaged paintings, which are the show's high point." In the exhibition catalogue, curator Schultz writes that Estes' art has "rooted in the nether, subsoil, and cloudborn worlds of sea, earth and sky intensely for enough years to produce a complex artful weave of realistic and abstract cellular, animal, vegetable and mineral forms."

In September 2006, the Pomona College Museum of Art in Claremont, California, mounted a major 35-year retrospective of Estes' work. Michael Duncan wrote in Art in America, "Estes is one of L.A.'s most underrated, yet most inventive artists who has deeply explored the intersection of nature and decoration in brash, vigorously constructed, brightly colored oil and acrylic paintings."

Critic Betty Brown wrote a catalogue essay for Lost Horizons at Galerie Anais, Santa Monica, California, describing Estes' paintings at the exhibition in 2009 as both beautiful and difficult: "They maintain this apparent contradictory state precisely because the joy we feel through sight--the sheer visual delight derived from her unabashedly exuberant shapes and colors and textures--is tempered by the sorrow we also feel as we recognize the environmental devastation undermining the luxurious abundance of her scintillating surfaces."

Estes' work is included in an online exhibition of work by artists working with the theme of nature. Curator and writer Constance Mallinson writes, "Through her multiple references to natural life from the sea to the air, Estes evokes a sublime sense of endangered and fragile beauty that extends globally."

About Un-Natural, an exhibition sponsored by the Los Angeles Municipal Art Gallery, installed at Barnsdall Park, Fabrik magazine art critic Peter Frank writes that the "expansive and complex formulations of Merion Estes, brimming with stylized references and visual montages…seem to be coding and recording how humanity interacts with nature." The exhibition earned honors from the International Association of Art Critics.

== Selected recent exhibitions ==
- LAPD (Los Angeles Pattern and Decoration), Rosamund Felsen Gallery, Bergamot Station, Santa Monica, California, 2003 (curated by Michael Duncan)
- Post Cool, San Jose Museum of Art, San Jose, California, 2004 (traveled to Otis College of Art Gallery, 2004)
- Contemporary Soliloquies on the Natural World: Karen Carson, Merion Estes, Constance Mallinson, Margaret Nielsen, Takako Yamaguchi, USC Fisher Galleries, Los Angeles, 2005 (cat.)
- A Sea of Possibilities: Works by Merion Estes 1971-2006, Pomona College Museum of Art, Claremont, California, 2006 (Catalogue/Rebecca McGrew)
- Women Artists in So Cal: Then & Now, Track 16 Gallery, Bergamot Station, Santa Monica, California, 2007
- Merion Estes: Recent Paintings, Cardwell-Jimmerson Gallery, Culver City, California, 2007
- Merion Estes: Lost Horizons, Galerie Anais, Bergamot Station, Santa Monica, California, 2009 (note; Catalogue essay by Betty Brown)
- Urbanature, An online exhibition of artists working with the theme of nature, Times Quotidian, Constance Mallison, curator, 2010
- Painting Per Se: Los Angeles Paintings from the Seventies, David Richard Contemporary Gallery, Santa Fe, New Mexico, 2011 (curated by Peter Frank)
- Un-Natural, Municipal Art Gallery at Barnsdall Park, Los Angeles, 2012
- Dystopia, CB1 Gallery, Los Angeles, 2015

== Awards and honors ==
- California Arts Commission Grant, 1980
- CETA Grant, Art in Public Spaces, 1980
- J. Paul Getty Trust Fund for the Visual Arts, Artist Fellowship, 1996
- Joan Mitchell Foundation Grant, Residency: Santa Fe Art Institute, Santa Fe, New Mexico, 2007
