= Amy Adler =

American artist

- Born: 1966 (age 59–60)
- Education: The High School of Music & Art; Cooper Union; University of California, Los Angeles; University of Southern California

Amy Adler (born 1966) is an American visual artist. She works in multiple mediums, using photography, film and drawing. She is currently a professor of Visual Arts at the University of California, San Diego.

She has had one-person shows at the Museum of Contemporary Art, Los Angeles, the Museum of Contemporary Art San Diego, and the Aspen Art Museum as well as galleries worldwide.

== Early life ==
Adler was born in 1966 and raised in New York City. She attended The High School of Music & Art (now known as the Fiorello H. LaGuardia High School) in Manhattan, and graduated in 1984. Adler graduated from Cooper Union and received an MFA in Visual Arts from UCLA and an MFA in Cinematic Arts from USC.

== Career ==
Adler's photographs are shot from her own drawings. In the 1990s, she developed a translation process, from photography to drawing back to photography. The final product, a unique photographic print of the drawing, became the original. The original drawings for the photographs, were destroyed. This is to be understood as a production process that puts the notions of authenticity and original in question and expanded.

In 2006, Adler inverted this process and now displays the original drawings, but always in relation to the intervention of media. For example, in her oil pastel drawings entitled, Location, from 2014, she uses location shots as source material for her drawings. In her drawings and photographs, Adler has always worked intensively with the medium of film. During her study of Cinematic Arts at USC from 2009 to 2012 she began making her own films. In 2012 she directed the 26-minute documentary Mein Schloss, and in 2016 she directed the 15 minute fiction film, Tear Jerker.

== Exhibitions ==
Adler's first one-person museum show was at the Museum of Contemporary Art Los Angeles in 1998 as part of their "Focus Series." Other solo shows include a "Hammer Project" at the UCLA Hammer Museum, where her project, Amy Adler Photographs Leonardo DiCaprio, was on display in 2002, solo shows at the Museum of Contemporary Art San Diego, the ACME Los Angeles, the Aspen Art Museum in 2006, and a solo project at the Drammens Art Museum in Norway in 2012.

In the spring of 2005 Twin Palms Press released a monograph of her work entitled, "Amy Adler Young Photographer."

=== Public collections ===
Adler's work is in the permanent collections of The Broad, The UCLA Hammer Museum, and The Museum of Contemporary Art Los Angeles, the Deste Foundation, LA County Museum of Art, the Museum of Contemporary Art San Diego, Pérez Art Museum, and the Santa Barbara Museum of Art.

== Bibliography ==
- Adler, Amy (2002). Different Girls (Exhibition catalog). Tokyo: Taka Ishii Gallery. OCLC 62702708.
- Adler, Amy (2005). Young Photographer. Santa Fe, NM: Twin Palms Press. ISBN 978-1-931885-37-9. OCLC 61106302.
- Zuckerman Jacobson, Heidi (2006). The Rainbow Hour. Illustrated by Amy Adler. Aspen, CO: Aspen Art Press. ISBN 0934324360. OCLC 191703092.
