= Comic Book Project =

United States afterschool program

The Comic Book Project is a United States comic-based afterschool program, in which elementary school children are given the opportunity to create comic books. The project was founded by Michael Bitz while part of the Teachers College at Columbia University, and is currently maintained by the Center for Educational Pathways.

== History ==
As a senior research assistant at the Center for Arts Education Research at Columbia University's Teacher's College, Michael Blitz founded the Comic Book Project in 2001. His goal was to apply his research findings into a creative approach to get children to "combine skills such as reading, writing, brainstorming and conceptualizing ideas." Blitz launched the project in a single elementary school in Queens, New York, and later expanded it to afterschool programs in other parts of the city. Blitz partnered with the non-profit organization After-School Corp in order to expand his project in 2003. The project had also received a push from adolescents comic book and manga clubs. By 2008, the Comic Book Project had spread to more than 850 urban and rural schools throughout the United States. The Comic Book Project is currently maintained by the Center for Educational Pathways.

== Outline ==
In Comic Book Project workshops, groups of children are given the opportunity to collaborate on creating comic books with complex characters and storylines.

== Publications ==
- Bitz, Michael (April 2010). When Commas Meet Kryptonite: Classroom Lessons from the Comic Book Project. Teachers College Press.
- Bitz, Michael (May 2009). Manga High: Literacy, Identity, and Coming of Age in an Urban High School. Harvard Education Press.
- Bitz, Michael (2004). "The Comic Book Project: Forging Alternative Pathways to Literacy". Journal of Adolescent & Adult Literacy, 47 (7), 574–588.
- Bitz, Michael (2004). "The Comic Book Project: The Lives of Urban Youth". Art Education, 57 (2), 33–39.

== See also ==
- Create a Comic Project
- Participatory art
- Apostolos Doxiadis
- Nick Sousanis
