= Nancy Buchanan =

American artist (born 1946)

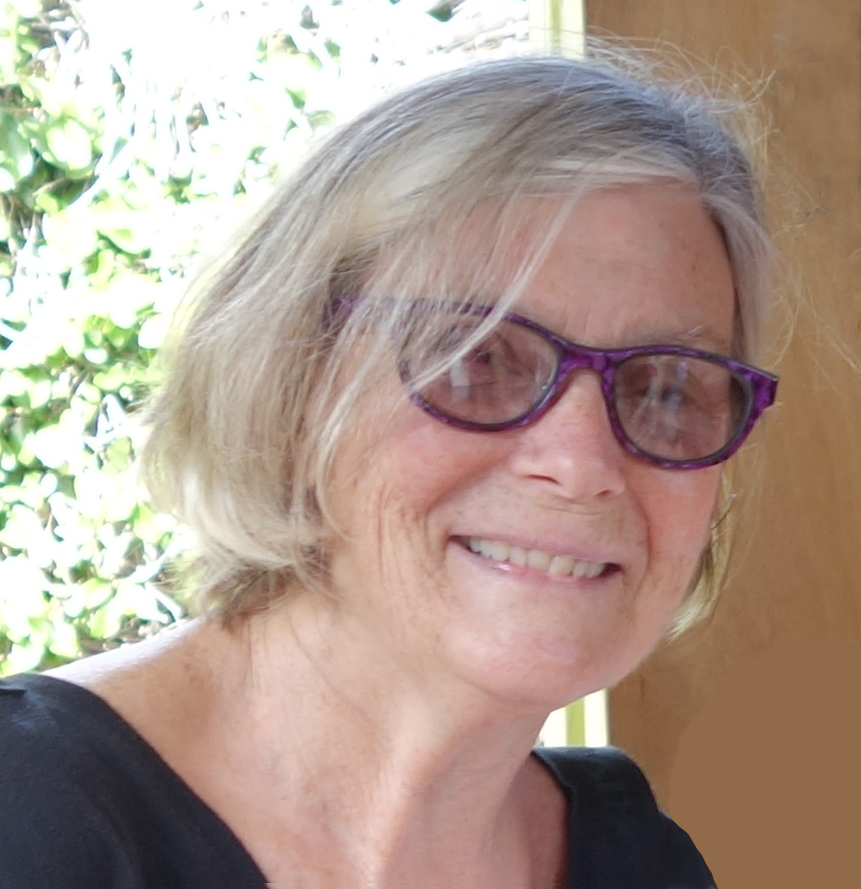
- Born: Nancy Page Ridenour; August 30, 1946 (age 80); Boston, Massachusetts, U.S.
- Known for: Installation, performance, and video art
- Website: nancybuchanan.net

Nancy Buchanan (born August 30, 1946) is an American visual artist, known for her work in installation, performance, and video art. She played a central role in the feminist art movement in Los Angeles in the 1970s. Her work has been exhibited widely and is collected by major museums including the Museum of Modern Art and the Centre Pompidou. She is Los Angeles-based.

== Early life and education ==
Buchanan was born Nancy Page Ridenour in Boston, Massachusetts. Her family moved to California when she was a child, and she was raised in Los Angeles, and briefly in Palo Alto.

She earned her B.A. and M.F.A. degrees at the University of California, Irvine, where she studied with Larry Bell, Vija Celmins, David Hockney, and Robert Irwin. Her classmate in the MFA program was Chris Burden.

== Work ==
Since the 1970s, Buchanan has made videos and performances that combine the personal and the political. Buchanan, like other feminist artists of the period (including Eleanor Antin, Martha Rosler, and Barbara T. Smith) "began incorporating fictional, political, or autobiographical narrative into their work, drawing on genres of mass media that could not successfully have been referenced by 'serious' art even a few years earlier."

Buchanan's early videos disrupt representational stereotypes through a feminist critique of formulaic narrative genres. Many of her later works document and critique insidious operations of political and corporate power, often with a wry sense of humor. Her video polemics of the 1980s and 1990s address such issues as government-sponsored fear tactics underpinning nuclear proliferation, American interventionist foreign policy in Latin America, and the role of exploitative real-estate speculation in the failure of the American dream.

Buchanan was a producer of Close Radio along with Paul McCarthy and John Duncan.

Andra Darlington writes in From California Video: Artists and Histories:

Nancy Buchanan began using video as a natural extension of performance and installation in the late 1970s and has continued experimenting with new media throughout her career. Her work explores the spaces between political essay, poetry, and performance. Video's reproducibility and its capacity for broad distribution have enabled Buchanan to disseminate her message outside the mainstream art establishment to a wider audience.

Buchanan was a founding member of several art organizations, including F Space Gallery in Santa Ana, CA; Grandview Galleries at the Woman's Building in Los Angeles; Double X, a feminist art collective (with artists including Merion Estes and Nancy Youdelman); Close Radio; and Los Angeles Contemporary Exhibitions (LACE). Currently, she is a member of The LA Art Girls and The Artists Formerly Known As Women. She also currently participates in group exhibitions with the SWANS collective (Slow War Against the Nuclear State).

== Teaching experience ==
In addition to her art practice, Buchanan taught courses in drawing, performance, video art (production, history and installation) and various courses examining connections between art and politics at many institutions, including the University of Wisconsin, Madison, where she established a Program in Non-Static Art; University of California Los Angeles, University of California San Diego, and the University of Arizona, Tucson. She was on the faculty at California Institute of the Arts (CalArts) in the School of Film/Video from 1988-2012. For many years, Buchanan led workshops with CalArts students at community centers and schools, making videos with middle- and high school students. She has lectured widely, and taught workshops in Video Art in Pusan, Korea, in the summer of 2000.

== Social activism ==
Active in anti-war organizations since her student days at UCI, Buchanan served as a close collaborator of Michael Zinzun, a Pasadena, California community activist, helping produce his cable-access television show, "Message to the Grassroots." In conjunction with this work, Buchanan traveled to Namibia to document that country's passage from South African Protectorate to independence in 1990; she produced One Namibia, One New Nation, an educational documentary for Zinzun's LA 435 Committee.

Her work "has pointedly examined social and political issues such as the status of women, the Cold War, U. S. policies toward the Third World, and the war in Nicaragua."

== Artworks and exhibitions ==
According to writer Jacki Apple, "Buchanan uncovered the darker side of the 1950s, not only in the deep schisms between her father's ideals as a scientist and the political realities that corrupted him, but in the underside of the idealized 'nuclear family.' "Fallout from the Nuclear Family (1980), is a portrait of Buchanan's prominent physicist-father, Louis Ridenour, comprising ten unique books assembled from his personal and professional papers.

Wolfwoman(1977) was created for the artists' magazine Criss Cross Double Cross, published by artist Paul McCarthy. "In Buchanan’s work, a conventional self-portrait appears alongside one of her as a jagged-teethed, hairy faced, mouth-agape WOLFWOMAN, with a text describing her reign of terror on LA’s male artists."

Buchanan's video Tech-Knowledge, incorporating image-processing techniques produced during a residency at the Experimental Television Centre (E.T.C.) in Owego, NY, was included in the California Video exhibition at the Getty Research Institute in 2007:

Tech-Knowledge (1984) examines how technology permeates society and shapes our consciousness. Electronically manipulated images of industrial technologies, with an emphasis on automated food production, point to our literal consumption and internalization of technological ideology.

Andra Darlington writes in the exhibition catalogue: "Buchanan produced two interactive computer pieces about pressing social issues: Peace Stack (named with reference to the authoring platform, Hypercard, exhibited 1991 in World News, Beyond Baroque Gallery, Venice, CA and at the Muckenthaler Cultural Center, Fullerton, CA), and S&L (S&L: Transactions in the Post-Industrial Era, Walter/McBean Gallery, San Francisco Art Institute, 1991)."

In 1993, Buchanan began work on a more elaborate interactive project, Developing: The Idea of Home. Incorporating images, video, audio and text recognition, it is a meditation on the significance of what home means in the contemporary era of rapacious land speculation and environmental degradation. Incorporating materials from many of her travels, including Namibia and Banff, Alberta, where she had a residency.

Lucy R. Lippard writes about the artwork in The Lure of the Local:

Home, is an interactive journal on the subject of development, with emphasis on the cyclical nature of Southern California real estate "booms," or "bubbles." Buchanan has been on the forefront of integrating progressive, concerned art with computer technology. In this complex visual/verbal survey, which is growing at subdivision rate, she asks how we view our landscape; how nostalgic and/or "marketing" images shape our conception of land and history; what contradictions are hidden when one perspective on development is privileged? Thoughts are associatively connected; images, texts and videoclips are grouped into categories that correspond to the process of developing a photograph.

re.act.feminism was a continually expanding archive and exhibition project on feminism and performance art traveling through Europe 2011 – 2013. It presented works by over 120 artists and artist collectives from the 1960s to the beginning of the 1980s, as well as contemporary positions. The re.act.feminism catalogue, edited by Bettina Knaup and Beatrice E. Stammer, will be published in March 2014, and is co-published by the Live Art Development Agency.

Through travel with ArtRole, a UK organization networking with artists in Kurdistan, Iraq, in 2008 she produced an experimental videotape exploring contemporary women's lives in that region.

Other notable video works include the American Dream series of miniature sculptures, completed with craftswoman Carolyn Potter. These feature scale-model dwellings incorporating working video.

== Selected curatorial projects ==
Buchanan has occasionally curated exhibitions, including:

- Social Works at Los Angeles Institute of Contemporary Art (LAICA) (1979);
- Show: The Flag, (2002, at The Armory Center for the Arts, Pasadena, CA) a collaborative project with Carol Wells, executive director of the Center for the Study of Political Graphics, in which posters and unique artworks utilizing the US flag as an expression of criticality were exhibited in response to the uncritical "patriotism," and xenophobia following the attacks of 9/11;
- American Dreams (2000), Umetnostna Galerija, Maribor, Slovenia.

In 2011, she was co-curator, with Kathy Rae Huffman, of Exchange and Evolution: Worldwide Video Long Beach 1974-1999, Long Beach Museum of Art, Long Beach, CA, which was part of Pacific Standard Time.

== Selected collections ==
- The Museum of Modern Art, New York
- Centre Pompidou, Paris
- Getty Research Center, Los Angeles
- Allen Memorial Art Museum, Oberlin, Ohio
- La Jolla Museum of Contemporary Art, La Jolla, California

== Awards ==
- COLA (City of Los Angeles Individual Artist's Grant): 1999
- Rockefeller Foundation Fellowship in New Media: 1997
- National Endowment for the Arts: 1978, 1980, 1983, 1987
- California Arts Council, Artists-in-Communities: 1985, 1986, 1987

== See also ==
- List of electronic literature authors, critics, and works
- Digital poetry
- Electronic literature
