= Create a Comic Project =

Youth literacy program and webcomic

The Create a Comic Project (CCP) is a youth literacy program and webcomic created by John Baird. The program uses comics, many taken from the Internet, to encourage children to write their own narratives. The program began in November 2006 at the main branch of the New Haven Free Public Library as an after-school program. The project has since worked with several other groups, including the Children's Museum of Pittsburgh, Braddock Carnegie Library, and the Pittsburgh YMCA. Baird has presented the results of his work on the project at several conventions and conferences, including South by Southwest Interactive and SXSWedu. The project has been praised for its work in engaging children in learning by Marjorie Scardino, CEO of Pearson, Professor Mirta Ojito of Columbia University, and Arne Duncan, then-US Secretary of Education.

The webcomic side of the project posts comics made by the children. The website was launched 4 January 2007. Archives of the Taiwan comics, labeled "Create a Comic Project ROC" or "CCP Version 1.0", go from 9 July 2005 through 28 November 2006. Comics generated in America, labeled "CCP Version 2.0", were first posted 29 November 2006.

== Project background ==
The Create a Comic Project was first conceived in the Republic of China while Baird was teaching English at Hess Educational Organization. He used it as an ESL activity in class. A version of the project was eventually published as part of Hess's official curriculum materials in their Student Activities Booklet, which as of 2007 is used in both the ROC and Singapore. One of Baird's inspirations was the Penny Arcade Remix Project.

After going to New Haven for graduate school at Yale University, Baird remade the project as a stand-alone activity for the New Haven Public Library. Library staffers called the program "wonderful" and said that it had "encouraged children to willingly express their creativity." In Pittsburgh, Baird hosted a number of workshops in the city before entering into a year-long collaboration with the Greater Pittsburgh YMCA's summer camp and after-school programs. While attending Teachers College, Columbia University, Baird brought the project into several area schools in the city, including LaGuardia High School and The School at Columbia University. From 2010 to 2012, the project was based in Houston, Texas, where Baird has given workshops to employees at the University of Texas Charter School and was invited to give workshops at the Conference for the Advancement of Math Teaching in 2011. The project is currently on hiatus with the website's last update on November 2011.

The program hosted regular comic tournaments at the New Haven Library from 2007 to 2011. They were funded by grant awards from the Community Foundation for Greater New Haven. The CCP is the single largest multi-webcomic collaborative project of its kind. It was the only comic-based children's program of its type in New Haven and Pittsburgh.

In 2009, Baird and other webcomic creators held a panel and two project-based workshops at Otakon. The project has also hosted panels and workshops at Tekkoshocon in 2009 and 2010. John was named a Featured Panelist for Otakon 2012 for his series of workshops. A Wheaton University student has created art for the project's official materials.

== Contributing comics ==
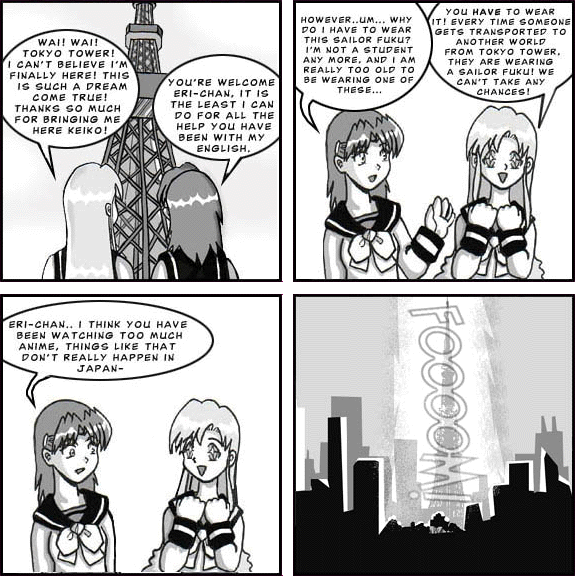
Okashina Okashi – Strange Candy

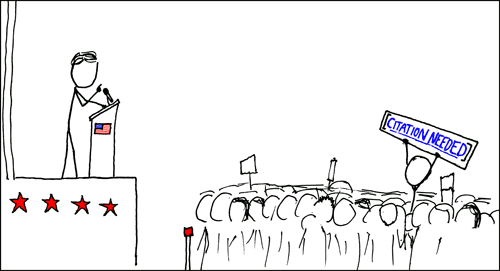
xkcd

Various comic creators allow Baird to use their work for the Create a Comic Project. The first webcomic ever used was Okashina Okashi - Strange Candy, with others following later. They include (in alphabetical order):

- Pete Abrams – Sluggy Freelance
- Gene Ambaum – Unshelved
- Christopher Baldwin – Little Dee
- Gina Biggs – Red String
- Jennie Breeden – The Devil's Panties, Geebas on Parade
- Maritza Campos – College Roomies from Hell!!!, Doomies
- Jorge Cham – Piled Higher and Deeper
- Brian Clevinger – 8-Bit Theater
- D. J. Coffman – Hero By Night, Flo Bots
- Karen Ellis – Planet Karen
- Phil Foglio – Girl Genius
- Shaenon Garrity – Narbonic, Skin Horse, Smithson, Lil' Mell and Sergio
- Meredith Gran – Octopus Pie
- Chris Hastings – The Adventures of Dr. McNinja
- Faith Erin Hicks – Demonology 101, Ice
- Bill Holbrook – Kevin and Kell
- Jeph Jacques – Questionable Content
- Kazu Kibuishi – Copper, Flight
- Kittyhawk – Sparkling Generation Valkyrie Yuuki
- Jenn Manley Lee – Dicebox
- Nina Matsumoto – Saturnalia
- Ian McConville – Mac Hall, Three Panel Soul
- Randall Munroe – xkcd
- Vinson "Bleedman" Ngo – Sugar Bits, Powerpuff Girls Doujinshi, Grim Tales From Down Below
- Michael Poe – Errant Story, Exploitation Now
- Scott Christian Sava – The Dreamland Chronicles
- Emily Snodgrass – Okashina Okashi - Strange Candy
- Kean Soo – Jellaby
- David Stanworth – Snafu Comics, Tin
- Richard Stevens – Diesel Sweeties
- Tycho and Gabe – Penny Arcade
- Zach Weiner – Saturday Morning Breakfast Cereal

== Awards ==
- In 2007, 2008, 2009, and 2010 the project won grants from the Community Foundation for Greater New Haven to support its tournament activity at the New Haven Public Library.
- In 2008, the project won a "This is Public Health" campaign award from the Association of Schools of Public Health (ASPH).
- In 2009, the project won a "Star of Distinction" from the University of Pittsburgh for its work in improving literacy among urban youths in Pittsburgh. It is the first and only youth literacy program in the city to have received this award.

== Publications ==
- Baird, John. Evaluating Math Concept Learning Using Comics. International Journal of Comic Art 15(1), 2013.
- Baird, John & Dana Newborn. The Effect of Age on Comic Narrative Creation. International Journal of Comic Art 13(2), 2011.
- Baird, John. Create a Comic: Inspiration. New York, NY: Lulu.com, 2010.
- Baird, John. Create a Comic Project #1 (2nd Edition). New York, NY: Lulu.com, 2010.
- Baird, John & Erin Ptah. Create a Comic Project #2. Pittsburgh, PA: Lulu.com, 2008.
- Baird, John & Ryan Estrada. Create a Comic Project Presents: Climate Change. Pittsburgh, PA: Lulu.com, 2008.
- Baird, John. Create a Comic Project #1. Pittsburgh, PA: Lulu.com, 2008.
- Baird, John. "Create a Comic." In Language Learning Games and Activities Volume 3 pg 14–15, edited by Gary Bosomworth and Sheryn Williams. Taipei, Taiwan ROC: Hess Educational Organization, 2005.

== See also ==
- Comic Book Project
