= Richard Ross (photographer) =

American photographer

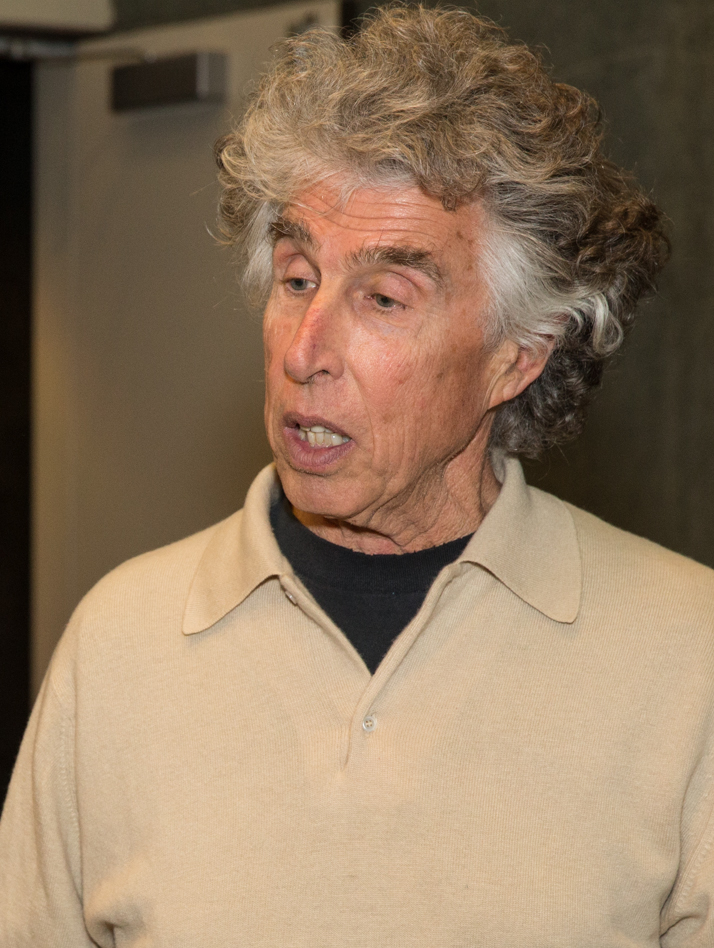
Ross in 2014

Richard Ross is an American photographer. He is best known for his body of work Juvenile in Justice, which has documented the U.S. juvenile justice system for the last 8 years. The project has been produced with the support of the Annie E. Casey Foundation and the John D. and Catherine T. MacArthur Foundation. In 2007 Ross was the recipient of a Guggenheim Fellowship to finish Architecture of Authority.

His latest project, Girls in Justice, focuses on girls in juvenile detention and treatment in the U.S. and will be shown at the Figge Art Museum in Davenport, Iowa in January 2015.

== Published works ==
Ross's first book, Museology, a photographic examination of museums and the display of art and historical objects, was published by Aperture Foundation in 1989 and features an introduction by Marcia Tucker, founder of the New Museum and former curator at the Whitney Museum of American Art, and an essay by David Mellor, art historian and curator.

His second book, Gathering Light explores natural and artificial light and its intrinsic relationship to photography itself through photographs of objects and places from all over the world. The book featured an introduction by Dave Hickey, a prominent art and culture critic, and an essay by Eduardo Cadava, faculty in the Department of English at Princeton University.

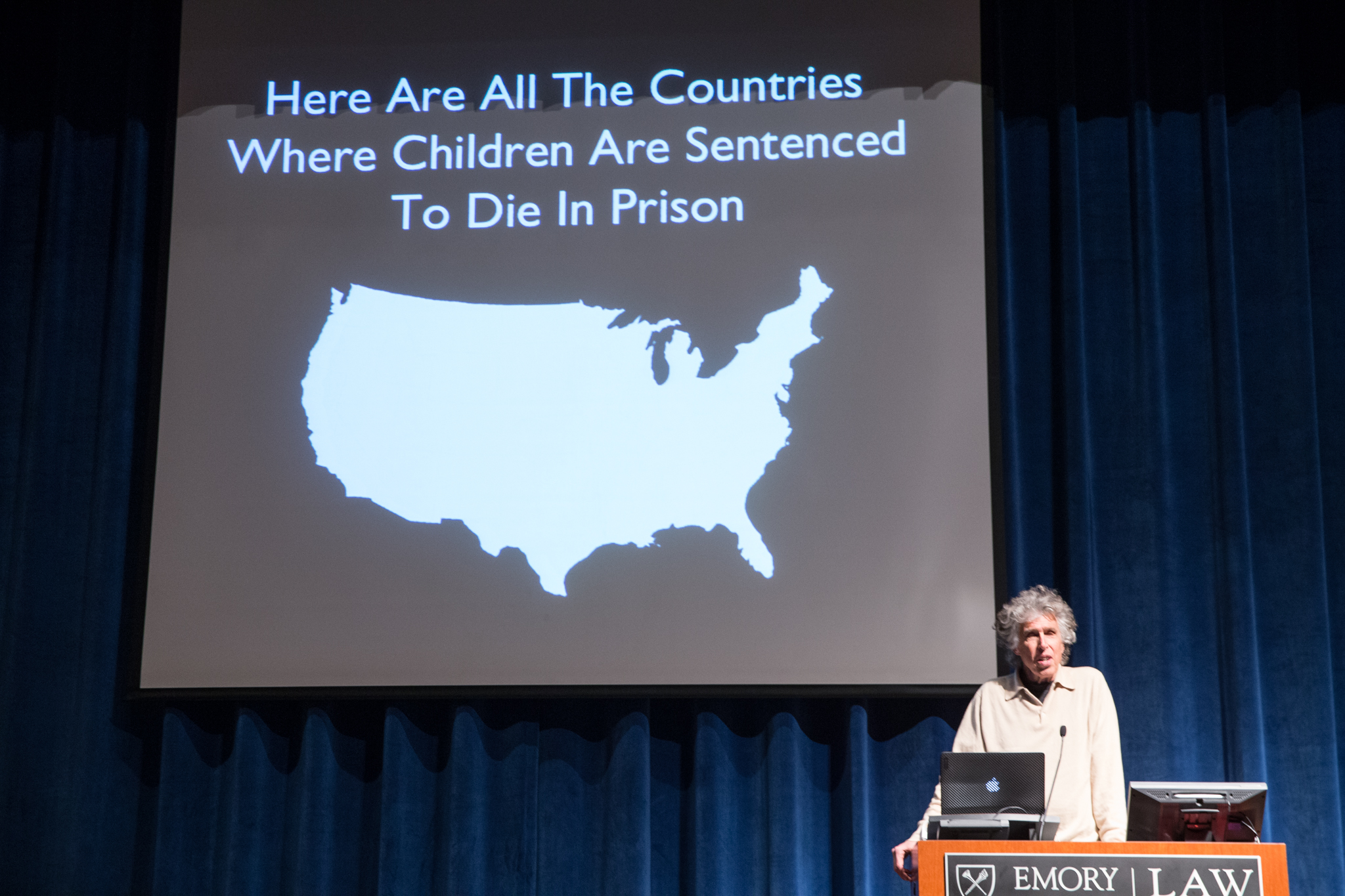
Ross focused on juvenile incarceration for Juvenile in Justice (2012)

Published in 2004, Ross's third book, Waiting for the End of the World is compiled of photographs of bomb and other underground shelters the world over, including an underground city in Beijing, China. Michael Darling, chief curator at the Museum of Contemporary Art, Chicago, wrote about Waiting for the End of the World that "Ross's images of bomb shelters represent a crushing indictment of the current state of world affairs as well as a clarion call to action." The book features an interview with Richard Ross by Sarah Vowell, a New York Times best selling author.

After Waiting for the End of the World Ross published three books compiling successful U.S. patent applications from the last century; Patently Ridiculous, Patently Erotic and Patently Christmas. The books were published by Plume.

In 2007, with Aperture Foundation, Ross published Architecture of Authority. The book was included in Photo District News best books of 2007 and the accompanying exhibition was number 10 on the Artforum list of best shows of 2007. The book features an essay by John R. MacArthur, publisher of Harper's Magazine.

Ross's first book covering the U.S. juvenile justice system, Juvenile in Justice, was published in 2012 with a foreword by Ira Glass and an essay by Bart Lubow. The nearly 150 images in the book were made over 5 years of visiting more than 1,000 youth confined in more than 200 juvenile institutions in 31 states.

== Exhibitions ==
=== Solo exhibitions ===
- ACME, Los Angeles (Architecture of Authority)
- Aperture Gallery, New York (Architecture of Authority)
- National Building Museum, Washington D.C (Architecture of Authority)
- Orange County Museum of Art (Gathering Light)
- Santa Barbara Museum of Art (Gathering Light)
- Sonnenberg, Lucerne, Switzerland (Waiting for the End of the World)

=== Group exhibitions ===
- Tate Modern, London; San Francisco Museum of Modern Art (Exposed: Voyeurism, Surveillance and the Camera)
- Ansel Adams Center for Photography (Beyond Boundaries)
- Catharine Clark Gallery, San Francisco, California (Teen age: You Just Don't Understand)
- Ronald Feldman Gallery, New York (Face Off)
- Guggenheim Gallery at Chapman University (New, Used, Borrowed)

== Teaching ==
Since 1977 Ross has taught at the University of California, Santa Barbara. He teaches photography and photojournalism.
