= Arts District, Los Angeles =

Arts District
- Neighborhood
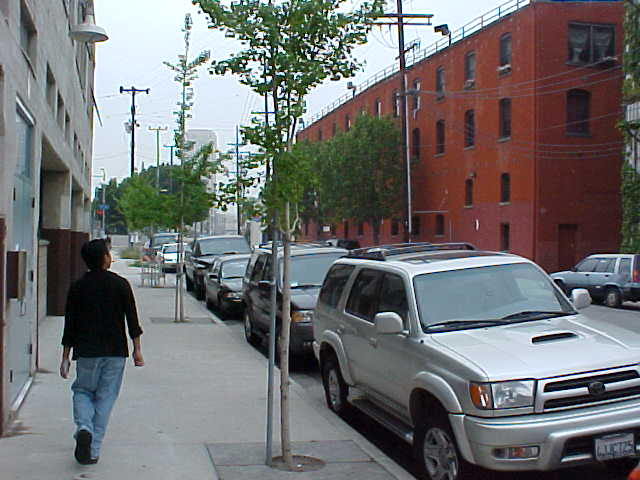
- The Arts District

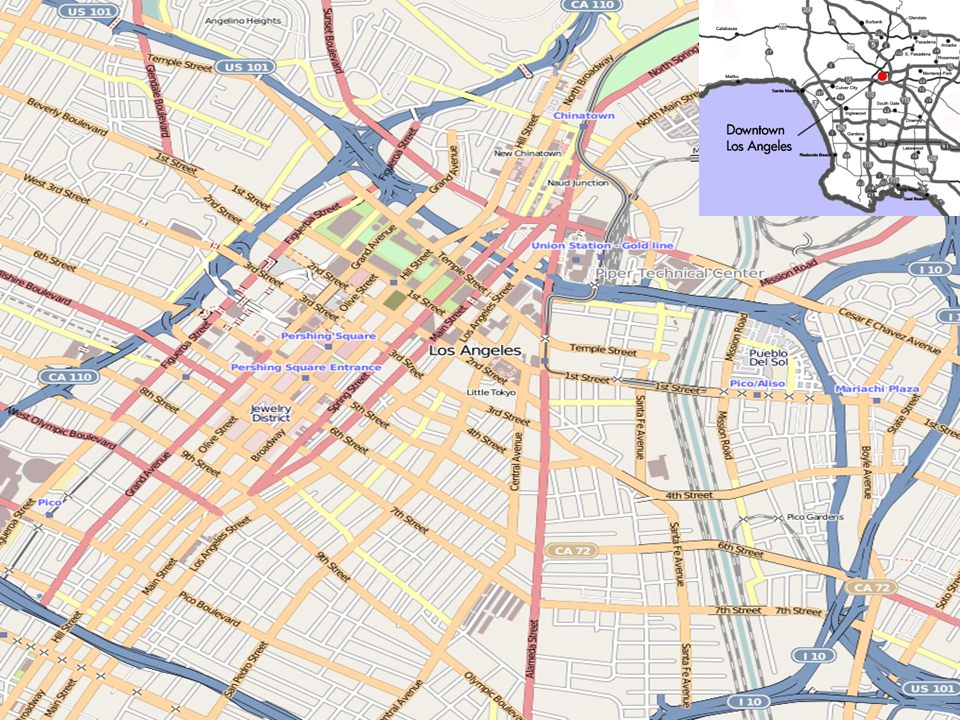
- Location within Downtown Los Angeles
- Coordinates: 34.04117°N 118.23298°W
- Country: United States
- State: California
- County: Los Angeles
- City: Los Angeles

Government
  - City Council: Ysabel Jurado
  - Board of Supervisors: Hilda Solis
  - U.S. House: Jimmy Gomez
- Area code: 213

The Arts District is a neighborhood on the eastern edge of Downtown Los Angeles, California in the United States. The city community planning boundaries are Alameda Street on the west which blends into Little Tokyo, First Street on the north, the Los Angeles River to the east, and Violet Street on the south. Largely composed of industrial buildings dating from the early 20th century, the area has recently been revitalized, and its street scene slowly developed in the early 21st century. New art galleries have increased recognition of the area amidst the downtown, which is known for its art museums.

== Early history ==
Spanish priest Juan Crespi founded what is now known as the Arts District in 1796 during an expedition to Alta California. During his journey, he discovered a body of water that was surrounded by rich soil. This inspired a passage in his journal that states: "Should a town be needed in this location, this site shall be called Our Lady Queen of the Angels." The small pueblo was declared a new territory for the Spanish and was officially founded on September 4, 1781.

Vignes Street is named for Jean-Louis Vignes, an aging adventurer and vintner who arrived in Los Angeles in 1831 by way of the Sandwich Islands (now Hawaii) and Bordeaux. He planted grapes on an area span of 104 acres (42 ha) where Cabernet and Sauvignon Blanc vines imported from the southern France thrived. By 1849, El Aliso, Vignes's vineyard named for the sacred local sycamore tree, was the largest producer of wine in California. The grapes are gone, but the San Antonio Winery just north of the community is a reminder of the area's past.

By the late 19th century, oranges and grapefruits had replaced grapes as the principal agricultural products of the area; as such, the property west of the riverbank was thick with citrus groves. The groves provided a location for filmmaker D. W. Griffith, who filmed parts of In Old California there in 1909. A print shop became the area's first commercial arts enterprise, employing artists from around the region designing labels for the boxes of citrus fruits shipped across the country.

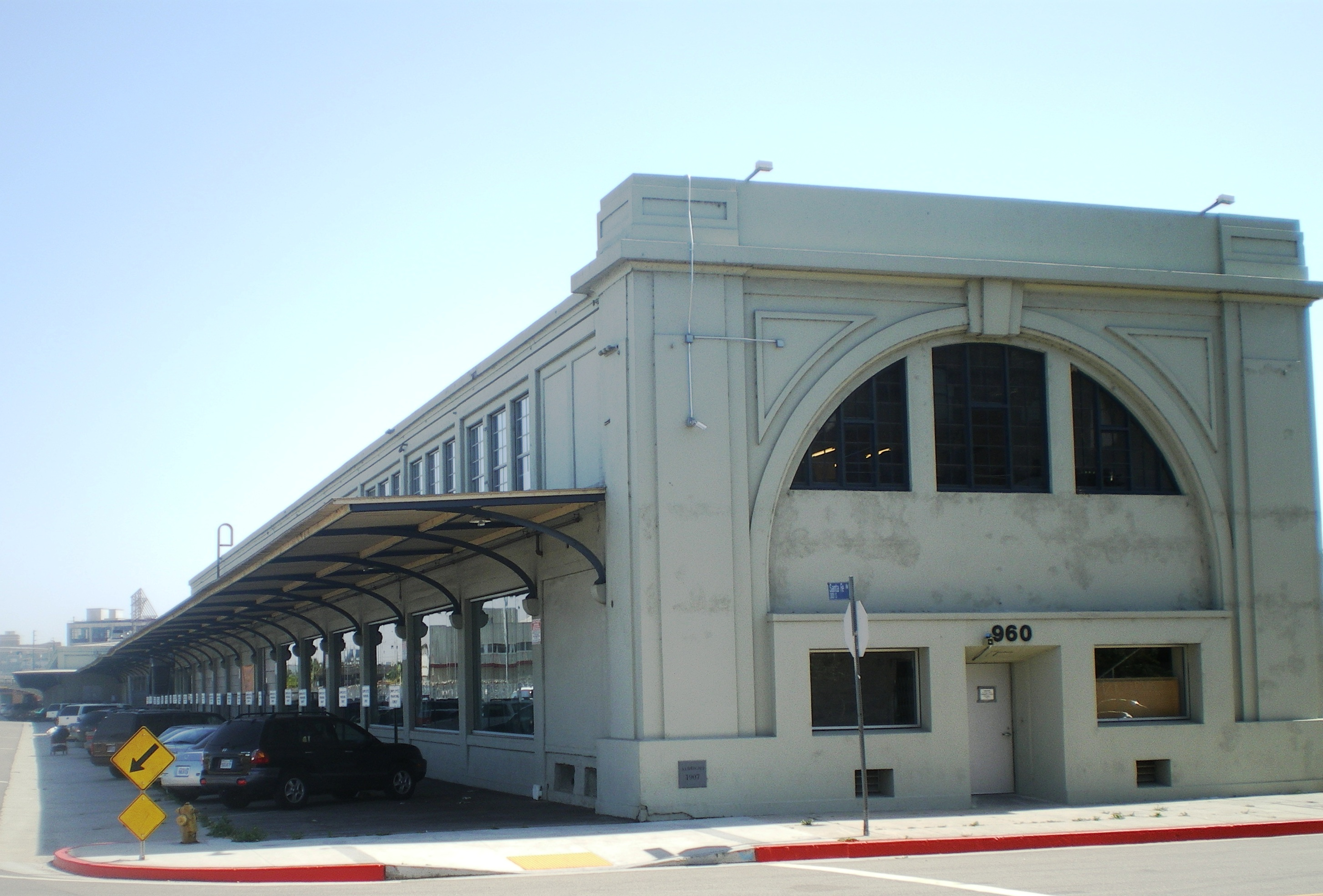
Santa Fe Freight Depot Building

The growing Santa Fe Freight Depot and warehouses created to serve the citrus industry's shipping needs determined the area's economic character for most of the next century and were responsible for the architectural flavor of the district's structures that have survived earthquakes, floods, and fires. The freight depot would later, in 2001, became the home for an architecture school and a building in the National Register of Historic Places, after the school relocated there. Please see Art & Art Related Colleges in this article.

The single-room hotels for rail workers to the northwest, and the growth of Little Tokyo to the west and Chinatown to the north, created a mix of working-class and cosmopolitan.

By World War II, the citrus groves had been replaced by factories and the rail freight business was giving way to the trucking industry. The area had taken on an industrial character that was growing seedy around the edges. Over the next twenty years, many of the small independent manufacturers had either been absorbed by larger competitors, grown too big for their quarters–or simply failed—and an increasing number of vacant warehouse and former factory spaces contributed to a dingy, decaying urban environment typical of many aging big American cities of the era.

In the 1950s, many manufacturing companies moved overseas or were overtaken by larger manufacturing companies, resulting in vacant buildings and the lowering of property values. Artists struggling to pay rent in the city started moving to the Arts District in the late 1960s and early 1970s. Before 1979, the Arts District buildings had been zoned for industrial use only. It was not until 1979 that the State of California passed a live/work legislation and in 1981 the city passed the Artist-In-Residence (AIR) bill. This allowed artists to live legally in the areas that could no longer be used for industrial use as long as they obtained a business license. To make living standards more comfortable the building code was lifted. New regulations had been created and the AIR legislation required the lofts to have room to sleep, a fire alarm, and other requirements.

== Art scene ==
=== 1960s ===
In 1969, Allen Ruppersberg presented Al's Cafe at 1913 West Sixth Street. In the mid-'70s, a handful of artists, including Joel Bass, Dan Citron, Woods Davy, Marc Kreisel, Jon Peterson, Stephen Seemayer, Maura Sheehan, Coleen Sterritt, Sydney Littenberg, Peter Zecher, and others saw opportunity in the empty buildings and began colonizing the area, converting former industrial and commercial spaces into working studios and living quarters, sometimes renting space for as little as a three cents a square foot. This resulted in a surge of artistic activity, culminating in the highly controversial "Downtown L.A. in Santa Barbara" exhibition, organized by Betty Klausner for the Santa Barbara Contemporary Arts Forum, which is now known as the Museum of Contemporary Art Santa Barbara. By the mid-1980s, the following artists were also living downtown: Linda Frye Burman, James Croak, Merion Estes, Joe Fay, George Herms, Mary Jones, Constance Mallinson, Paul McCarthy, Margaret Nielson, Richard Newton, Margit Omar, Lari Pittman, John Schroeder, Judith Simonian, Andy Wilf, and Takako Yamaguchi.

=== 1970s ===
LA Artcore, founded in 1976 by Lydia Takeshita with the purpose of exhibiting local artists, exists today in locations at the Brewery Art Colony and in Little Tokyo. Lydia Takeshita and LA Artcore are considered the founding forces for the origins of the Arts District. The foundation used to publish the magazine Visions Art Quarterly, which had covered the contemporary art scene at that time.

In 1979, Marc Kreisel opened Al's Bar in the American Hotel on Hewitt just off Traction. This legendary punk rock venue was the training ground for Sonic Youth, Red Hot Chili Peppers, Beck, the Fall, the Residents, introducing generations of Angelenos to dozens of emerging groups. The popular sound band Party Boys played the bars and art events. Also known as the downtown artists' central meeting place, Al's Bar occasionally hosted art exhibitions. Al's Bar, the West Coast's oldest punk club, finally closed in 2001, and the American Hotel received a facelift in 2012 and was renamed the American Apartments. Stephen Seemayer's film The Young Turks (2012) documents the 1979–1981 years.

=== 1970s-1980s ===
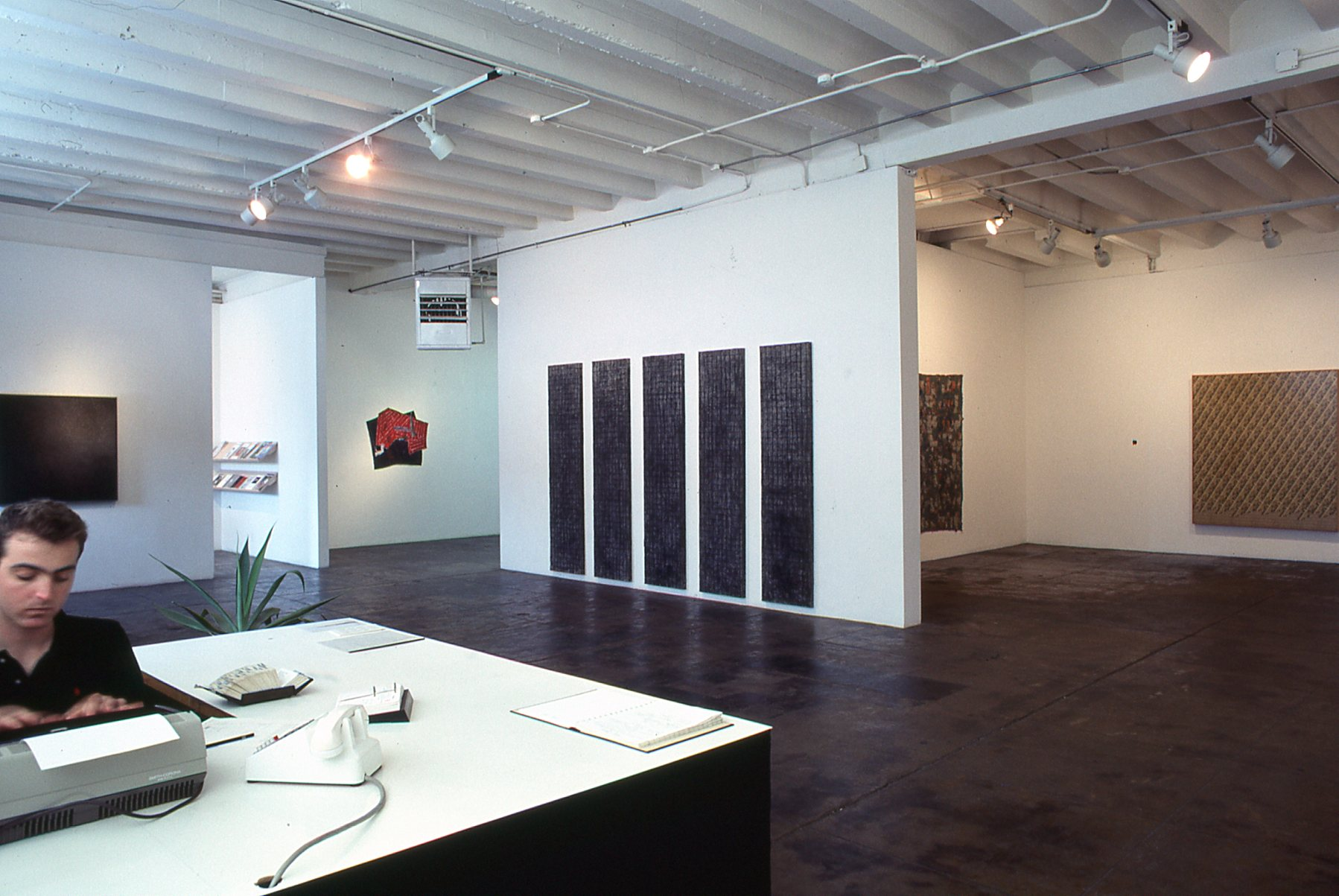
Cirrus Gallery

The Atomic Cafe on 1st Street at Alameda was an artist and musician haunt in the late 1970s and early 1980s. Los Angeles Contemporary Exhibitions (LACE) created exhibitions at its gallery space, located in the late 70s on Broadway St before moving to Industrial Street in the 1980s. Several commercial art galleries, including Oranges and Sardines, Kirk DeGoyer Gallery, the Downtown Gallery, Vanguard Gallery, Exile, and Galleria by the Water opened in the late seventies, only to close in the early eighties. The Rico Gallery opened in 1988 closed in 1991, Julie Rico Gallery lived on in Santa Monica, CA. Cirrus Editions, the first gallery to open downtown, remains open.

Around 1980, Jon Peterson and Stephen Seemayer opened "DTLA," a club that had exactly one show before it closed, adjacent the Atomic Cafe. High Performance magazine used DTLA as its performance space until its one-year lease was up. In that year, Paul McCarthy performed Monkey Man during the Public Spirit Performance Festival, Part 1. The name DTLA was later adopted by the neighboring coffee house where Beck got his start.

In 1981, the City of Los Angeles passed its "Artist in Residence" or "AIR" ordinance, which allowed residential use of formerly industrial and commercially zoned buildings; artists had long used such spaces as living quarters illegally, and the AIR law sought to bring this practice into legality and regulation. Art galleries, cafes, and performance venues opened as the live/work population grew.

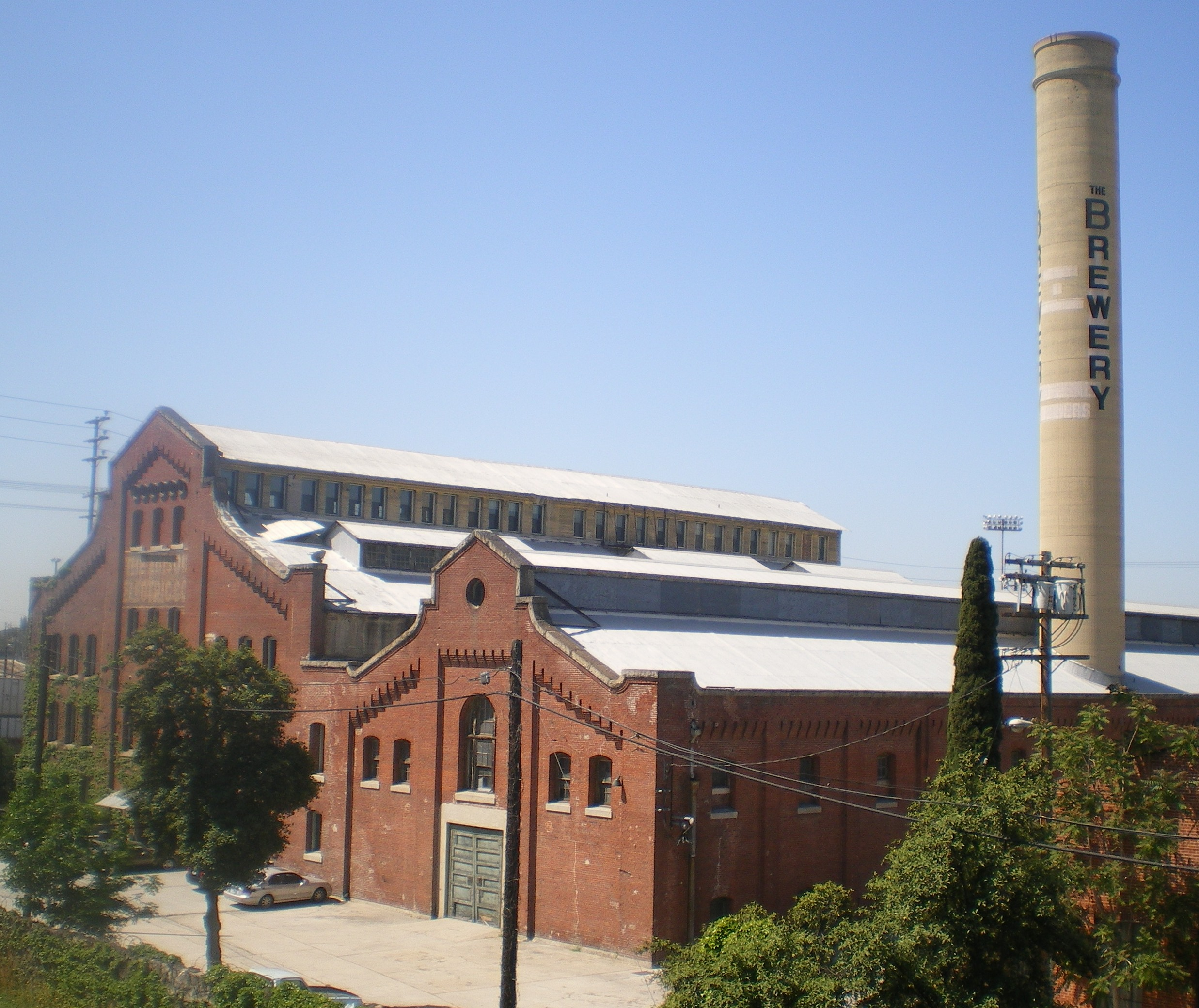
The Brewery Art Complex

In 1982, the Brewery Art Colony opened in the Arts District in what was a former brewery building. It was described by the Los Angeles Times in 1999 as “world’s largest art complex."

During the '80s, Bedlam, created by artist Jim Fittipaldi, on 6th Street (and later, briefly, in the former premises of Al's bar) was a salon with drawing workshops, art installations, theater, live music, and a speakeasy. Dangerous Curve, on an unsafe curve of 4th Place between Mateo and Molino, put on exhibitions of artists whose work was often difficult to categorize. The Spanish Kitchen, a warehouse space on Third near Traction, was home to series of happenings, events, raves, installations, and blowout parties. It now houses the 3rd Steakhouse and Lounge, an eatery that hosts community events and exhibitions of works by local artists. Cocola (later known as the 410 Boyd St. Bar and Grill), the legendary artists' bar just west of the Arts District, lives on as Escondite.

In 1985, Fritz Frauchiger curated "Off the Street," a "one-time art exhibition" sponsored by the Cultural Affairs Department in the Old City Print Shop, which featured paintings, sculptures, photographs, and installations by 48 Los Angeles artists, most of whom lived downtown.

=== 1990s ===
In 1994, the nonprofit group Downtown Arts Development Association (DADA) was formed as a spinoff of LARABA by several artist members of the LARABA board of directors in order to provide a platform for the burgeoning downtown art scene; DADA hosted exhibits of more than 400 downtown artists in 1994–1998. After 1994, the heart of the Arts District was Bloom's General Store, presided over by Joel Bloom, a veteran of Chicago's Second City, who became an advocate for the community and who is remembered as The Arts District's once and only unofficial mayor. (Bloom died in 2007, but his memory is honored with a plaque from the city declaring the triangle around Third, Traction, and Rose to be Joel Bloom Square.) Cornerstone Theater, an enterprise that brings community theater to locations all around the country, resided on Traction Avenue for 20 years. Around the corner, on Hewitt at 4th Place, the nonprofit ArtShare offers lessons in art, dance, theater, and music to urban youth and features a small theater once used by Padua Playwrights. Padua stages plays around the city, often in non-traditional environments, and hosts playwriting workshops.

=== 2000s ===
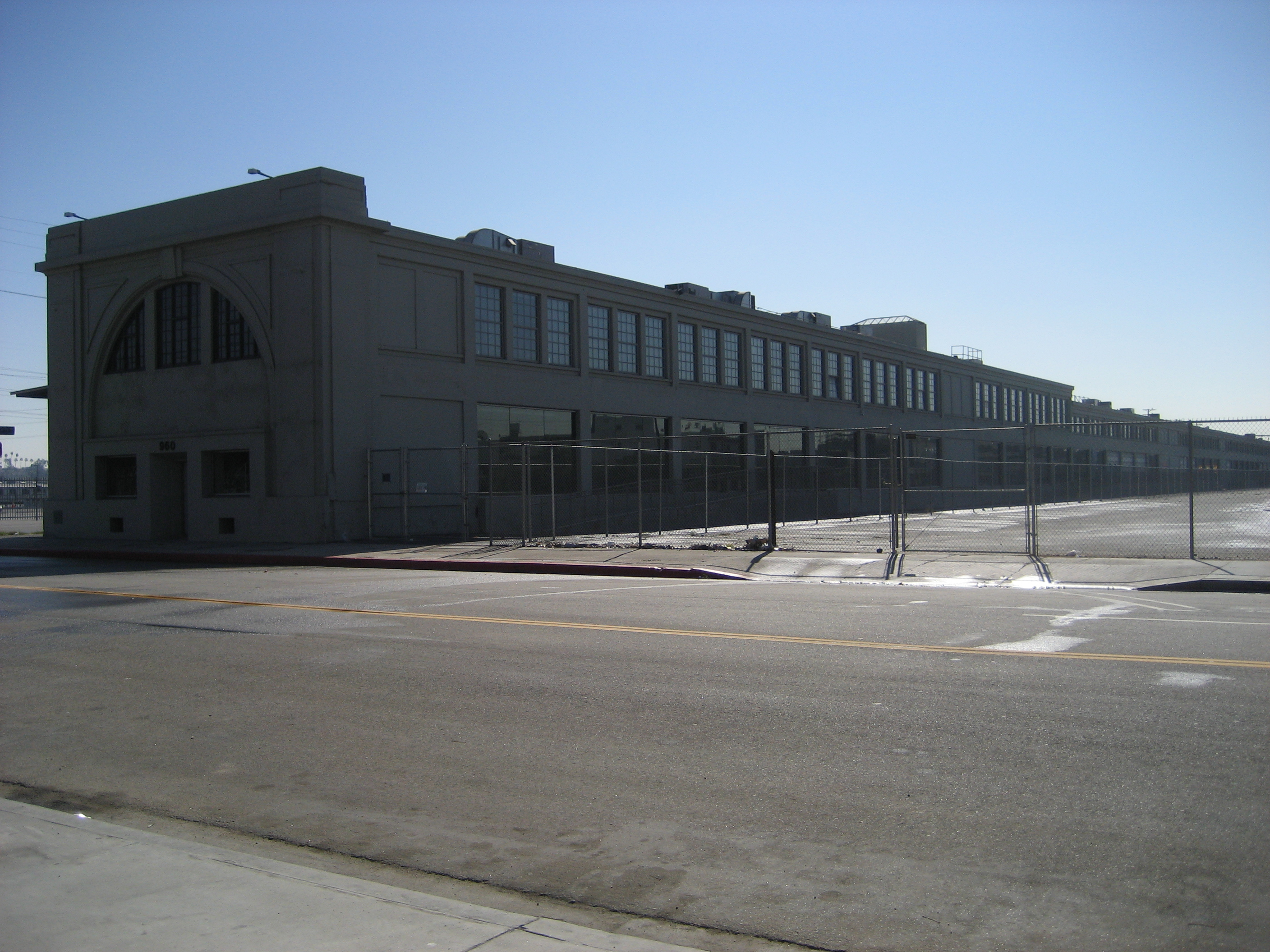
The former Santa Fe Freight Depot building is now the Southern California Institute of Architecture (SCI-Arc). View facing the institute library.

In 2001, the Southern California Institute of Architecture (SCI-Arc) relocated from Marina Del Rey, California to Downtown Los Angeles, to the former Santa Fe Freight Depot building and has been an anchor for the Arts District.

In 2005, Julie Rico - owner of the Rico Gallery at the edge of Little Tokyo and the Arts District and the Julie Rico Gallery in Santa Monica - hosted an art event. Titled the "LA ART FEST," this gathering would occur in an empty lot in the center of the Arts District next to Sci-Arc. Doug Rimerman curated the electronic stage with an array of artists who performed on stage during the evening hours of the festival. LAAF Electronic Stage Line-up

A+D Museum of architecture and design, which was founded by Stephen Kanner and Bernard Zimmerman in 2001, is located in the Arts District. Natasha Sandmeier was named executive director of the museum in 2022.

== Landmarks ==
According to the Los Angeles Conservancy the area's registered landmarks are:

1. Pickle Works/Citizen Warehouse: 1001 East 1st Street
2. Challenge Dairy Building: 929 East 2nd Street
3. Southern California Supply Co.: 810 East 3rd Street
4. Southern California Institute of Architecture: 960 East 3rd Street
5. American Hotel: 303 South Hewitt Street
6. Toy Factory Lofts: 1855 Industrial Street
7. Biscuit Company Lofts: 1850 Industrial Street

== Current status ==
The city community planning boundaries today are Alameda Street on the west, First Street on the north, the Los Angeles River to the east, and Violet Street on the south. Challenges facing the district today include the loss of affordable live/work lofts, artists, and historically significant buildings. Community leaders are struggling to create balance amidst the economic issues brought about by gentrification and the need to preserve the character of the Arts District as a creative community that has made contributions to the cultural and economic well-being of the city for decades. In 2014, the average annual income for neighborhood residents was $120,000. While the initial decades saw the conversion to residential and commercial uses of low-slung warehouses and industrial spaces, downtown zoning laws could be rewritten to permit the heights of buildings to double, allowing up to 1,500 new residential units to be built in eight-story, one hundred feet (30 m) edifices.

The Southern California Institute of Architecture (SCI-Arc) resides in a quarter-mile-long (0.40 km) former Santa Fe Freight Depot built in 1907 that has been placed on the National Register of Historic Places. Across the street is a 438-unit apartment complex, One Santa Fe, which opened in 2014 and was designed by Michael Maltzan Architecture (MMA).

The century-old Coca-Cola manufacturing plant at 4th and Merrick Streets, around the corner from the oversize Santa Fe railroad dock that houses SCI-Arc, is the latest in adaptive reuse into creative spaces. The three-story brick-clad building was described as the "headquarters for the company's Pacific Coast business and for its export trade in the Hawaiian Islands and Old Mexico" when it was built in 1915. The complex has been renamed Fourth & Traction after Traction Avenue. The Hauser Wirth & Schimmel complex opened in 2016 in buildings that date from the 1890s to the 1940s that occupy an entire city block on East 3rd Street.

The district continues to be a popular location for filming due to its historic vibe. In 2016, the head of the neighborhood's business improvement district stated that "There's not one day where there's not shooting." The popular TV sitcom New Girl takes place largely in an apartment loft located in the Arts District. Filming has become complicated due to the development of the retail sector and residents who will be disturbed by filming at night. Also, many formerly empty lots and streets are now under development where crews used the space to park trucks and trailers.

In 2017 developer Suncal proposed a $2 billion, 1.95 million square feet (0.181 million square metres) mixed-use project which includes two 58-story buildings designed by Herzog and de Meuron. The project, called "6 am," will be located along 6th Street between Mills and Alameda. The live/work space will include 1,700 apartments and condos, shops, offices, hotels, charter schools, and an underground garage. Condos average price will be $1,000 per square foot. New developments have displaced artists since they can no longer afford to be in the Arts District. In 2016 the median price for the property was $714,500, a huge increase from 2013 when open lofts were priced at 370 per square foot.

In 2017, the district received a $15 million award from the Active Transportation Program which will enhance the Arts District with new bike lanes, enhancement of sidewalks, and street lighting. The program will bring two signalized intersections, pedestrian lighting, four pedestrian crosswalks, and one mile of bike lanes. Little Tokyo and Arts District Regional Connector Station have pedestrian and bicycle access with the Sixth Street Viaduct. The bridge, a $588-million span rebuilt in 2022, connects the Arts District to the Eastside and Whittier Boulevard.

Warner Music Group moved into a building in 2019 that formerly housed a Ford Motor Company assembly plant.

== Transportation ==
The Arts District is located near the center of Downtown Los Angeles making it more accessible to alternate forms of transportation. The Los Angeles County Metropolitan Transportation Authority (Metro) L Line station was located along Alameda Street, though this is currently closed and was replaced by an underground light rail station between Alameda Street & Central Avenue on the A and E lines in 2023 as part of the Regional Connector project. The cross streets are along East First and East Temple Streets. The small neighborhood is also serviced by the Los Angeles Department of Transportation (LADOT) DASH bus making several stops on Hewitt Street.

Additionally, Metro offers a bike share program in many neighborhoods around the area. The following five stations currently available to pick up or leave a bike are listed below.

1. 740 East 3rd Street
2. 999 East 3rd Street
3. 1245 Factory Place
4. 1301 Willow Street
5. 720 East Temple Street

There are a total of sixteen parking lots scattered around the Arts District. As the area became a social hub for city folk, parking became an issue to local residents. Public and private lots/structures including on-street parking offer a variety of parking options for visitors.

In addition, there is a proposal to extend the terminus of the Los Angeles Metro Rail's B Line and D Line, both heavy rail subway lines, to a station in order to give more efficient public transit to the members of the fast-growing community. It is currently in the environmental review stage, with a report expected to come out in 2022.

Furthermore, Phase 2 of the planned Southeast Gateway Line light rail line plans to have two stations in the Arts District: one in the Industrial District on 7th and Alameda (which could be either aerial or underground) and another in Little Tokyo (would be underground; planned to have an out-of-system transfer to the Little Tokyo station on the A & E lines).

== Art and art-related colleges ==
The Southern California Institute of Architecture (SCI-Arc) relocated to the Santa Fe Freight Depot, a building originally constructed in 1907. The school has become an anchor for the arts district.

Otis College of Art and Design was originally in the downtown Los Angeles area in Westlake, across the street from MacArthur Park. For qualified artists, the college was able to offer faculty positions. In 1997, the college moved its main campus to the Westchester area, near the Los Angeles airport.

An art-related school that is presently in the downtown Los Angeles area is presently the Fashion Institute of Design and Merchandising (FIDM). As of 2023, FIDM is part of Arizona State University (ASU) and is now ASU FIDM. Not far from the Arts District as well is the Los Angeles Fashion District, which was historically a source of jobs for artists working with textile patterns and design.

== See also ==
- The Brewery Art Colony
