= Wholesale District =

Wholesale District may refer to some city districts in the United States

- Wholesale District, Los Angeles, California
- Wholesale District, Indianapolis, Indiana
- Wholesale District (Kansas City, Missouri), listed on the NRHP in Missouri
