= Alexis Smith (artist) =

American artist (1949–2024)

- Born: Patricia Anne Smith; August 24, 1949; Los Angeles, California, U.S.
- Died: January 2, 2024 (aged 74); Los Angeles, California, U.S.
- Education: University of California, Irvine
- Known for: Collage and installation
- Spouse: Scott Grieger (m. 1990)
- Awards: Otis College of Art and Design, Honorary Doctorate (2001)

Hell on Wheels by Alexis Smith, 1985, mixed-media, Honolulu Museum of Arts

Patricia Anne Smith (August 24, 1949 – January 2, 2024), known professionally as Alexis Smith, was an American visual artist. She worked in collage and installation.

== Biography ==
Smith was born in Los Angeles on August 24, 1949. Her father was a psychiatrist and she spent her childhood years living first on a citrus grove in Covina, California, and then on the grounds of a mental hospital. "It was just off enough to be affecting," she later stated, "it had that edge of nonreality, of literal craziness".

As a girl Smith created collages by cutting up and combining words and images. It was only later that friends encouraged her to take art classes. She studied with Vija Celmins and Robert Irwin at UC Irvine, receiving her B.A. in 1970. In college, she impulsively changed her name to Alexis Smith, the name of the Hollywood actress of the 1940s and 1950s, and who won a Tony award in the 1970s.

Smith was married to artist Scott Grieger in 1990. Initially diagnosed in 2015, she died from complications of Alzheimer's disease at her home in Los Angeles on January 2, 2024, at the age of 74.

== Artistic style ==
From the 1970s on, Smith produced collages, artist's books, and gallery installations that combine found objects, images, and texts. Her collages from the early and mid-1980s focus on entertainment and leisure, while those made from the mid-90s to the early 2000s focus on fashion and commerce.

Smith combined text and imagery from a variety of sources to explore the psychology of the American identity. She drew elements for her collages from pop culture, movies, romance novels, magazines, and advertising, as well as the fiction and nonfiction works of a wide range of writers including Walt Whitman, Gertrude Stein, Thomas Mann, and Raymond Chandler. Hollywood stories, the celebrity culture, advertisements, and Hollywood memorabilia figure frequently in her work, in part due to her upbringing in Los Angeles. To Smith Hollywood is a place fraught with symbols and redolent with possibility, which engenders a different concept of art than that on the East Coast.

The objects used in Smith's works were commonly found on the street, at garage sales, thrift stores, and swap meets, and via gifts and chance encounters. On her approach to collage, Smith stated, "there’s a kind of symbiosis to it—the things, the words, the background, and the objects. It's fused into a whole where they seem like they’ve always been together, or were meant to be together. The people that look at them put them together in their heads". Her approach to collage utilizes a mixture of literacy with a conceptual point of view.

In addition to collages, Smith also created gallery installations, which have been described as addressing the glut of imagery that characterizes contemporary life. Large-scale public works include Snake Path (1992), a 560-foot-long inlaid slate path for the Stuart Collection at UC San Diego, terrazzo floors for the Los Angeles Convention Center and the Schottenstein Sports Arena at Ohio State University, and a multimedia collage installation "Taste" in the Restaurant at the Getty Center. Snake Path makes several references to biblical conflict between innocence and knowledge as the installation is a footpath in the form of a serpent surrounding a "garden of Eden". Additionally, there are quotes from Thomas Gray and Milton's Paradise Lost. Through works like Snake Path, Smith attempts to reevaluate the ideological formation of mass culture and the use of so-called classical knowledge.

Smith's art can be seen as part of the tradition of California assemblage. Her work has also been compared to that of Barbara Kruger for its use of language, and to Joseph Cornell and Betye Saar for its combinatory aesthetic. Smith's work is characterized by humor, irony, poignancy, and a deliberately open-ended message. Her Hell on Wheels from 1985, in the collection of the Honolulu Museum of Art, demonstrates her approach to assemblage as well as her humorous and ironic titles.

== Exhibitions ==
Smith's work had been exhibited at major museums including the Museum of Contemporary Art, Los Angeles, the Museum of Modern Art, the Whitney Museum, the Brooklyn Museum, the Walker Art Center, and the Institute of Contemporary Art, Boston.

Smith collaborated with Poet Amy Gerstler on several installations, including "Past Lives" at the Santa Monica Museum of Art.

"Second Nature" was an exhibition of Smith's work at the Craig Krull Gallery in Santa Monica, California in 2013. In the exhibition, Smith explored how the concepts of wisdom and innocence are not in opposition as they are presented as in the biblical story of the Garden of Eden. The majority of Smith's work in this exhibit consists of a landscape portrait painted by an amateur with romantic subjects in the scenes of sailing ships, forests, tropical islands, desert sunsets, bridges, barns, and city streets. Smith also included one or two small items such as a ruler, straw hat, crushed beer can, or key chain in most of these works in order to contradict the setting of the painting. There are also quotes by Walt Whitman and Henry David Thoreau printed on the gallery walls which further speak to the subject matter of Smith's paintings.

In a 2015 exhibition at Garth Greenan Gallery located in lower Manhattan, Smith's works were presented for the first time in a New York gallery in over a decade. The exhibition was an overview of Smith's work from 1994 to 2015. Smith examined American culture of the 1940s and 1950s by combining images and texts from the time period such as postcards, road maps, movie stills, and advertising art into witty statements. A common theme in her works is the city of Los Angeles. Smith acknowledged the fascination surrounding Hollywood as a place where people believe dreams come true in order to comment on the illusion of the quintessential American transformation myth which is also known as the American Dream. Since this exhibit, the Garth Greenan Gallery has held three more exhibitions of Alexis Smith's works in 2018 and 2019.

== Collections ==
Smith's works are in the permanent collections of numerous arts institutions, including the Museum of Modern Art, Whitney Museum of American Art, National Gallery of Art, Getty Research Institute, and Los Angeles County Museum of Art.
