= Al's Bar (American Hotel) =

Hotel in Los Angeles, California, United States (1979–2001)

Coordinates: 34.045300°N 118.236257°W

American Hotel
- Interactive map of the American Hotel area

General information
- Location: Hewitt Street and Traction Avenue, Los Angeles
- Opened: 1979
- Closed: 2001
- Owner: Marc Kreisel and partners

Al's Bar (1979-2001) was a Los Angeles bar in the American Hotel, known as the West Coast's oldest punk club. It served as a gathering spot for downtown LA’s arts and music scenes, hosting original theater productions, alternative art exhibitions, and the experimental "No Talent Nights".

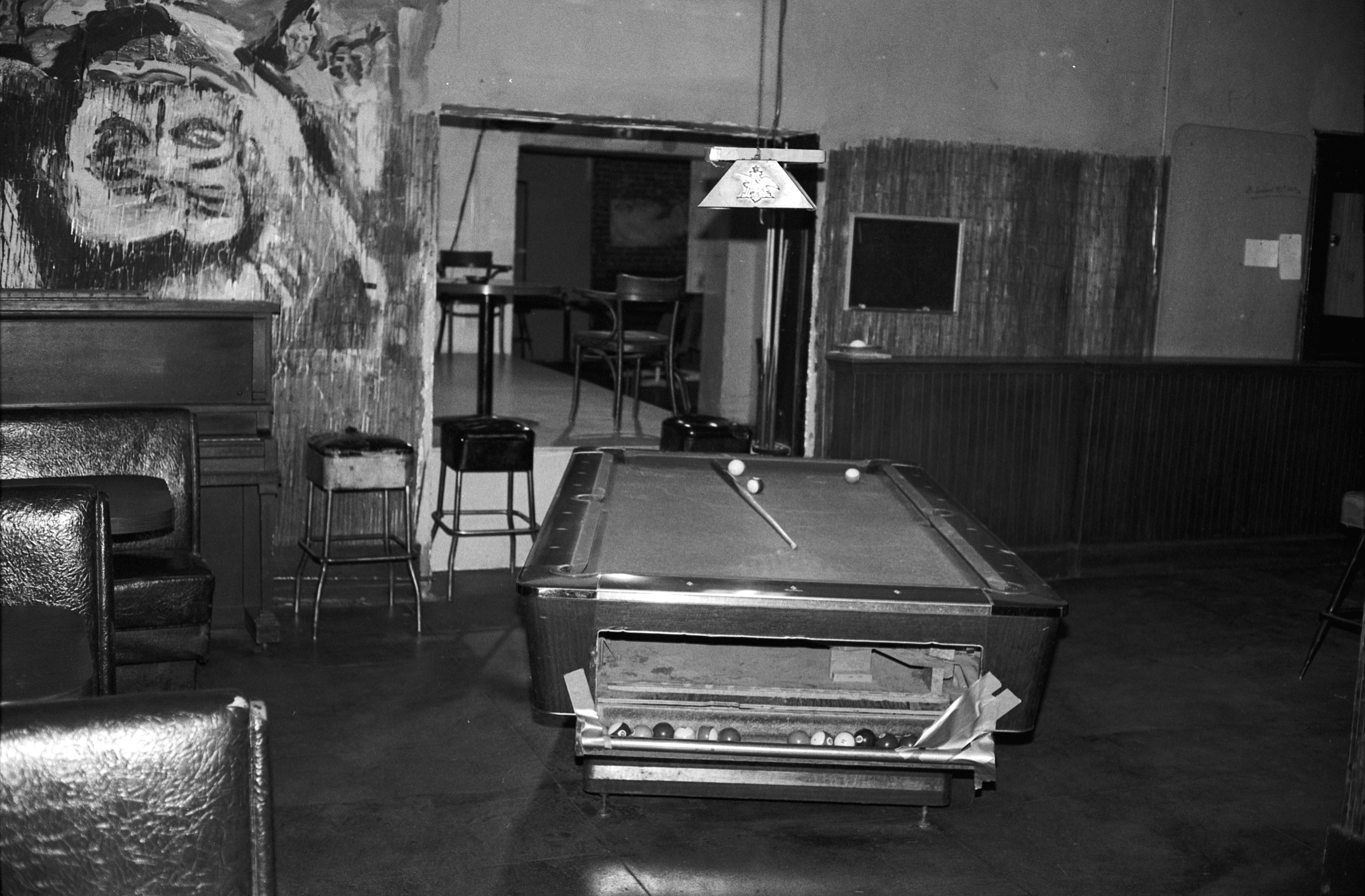
Al's Bar

== Al's Bar (1979-2001) ==
=== History ===
In 1979, Marc Kreisel and his partners purchased the dilapidated American Hotel on Hewitt Street, with a view to creating a cultural hub for the burgeoning art scene forming in downtown Los Angeles. In addition to converting the hotel into galleries, studios, and a home for artists, Kreisel, who viewed the whole building as "one big art show," purchased the ground floor bar from Alfonso Vasquez, the bar's namesake. Al's Bar was created to give artists a place to discuss art over beer.

=== The "Money Pump" ===
Inspired by Joseph Beuys's Honey Pump (1977), Marc Kreisel envisioned Al's Bar as a "money pump" for circulating money around its community of artists. He imagined this surplus supporting a gallery, where artists could show their work. As Kreisel himself noted, "It was a capitalistic endeavor to support the arts by itself- an alternative to the feds and the state and getting grants." As such, the bar attracted a broad clientele, whose purchases actually covered salaries and band fees. The neon sign outside the bar forewarned customers to "Tip or Die." Al's Bar eventually acquired works by dozens of artists, including Katy Crowe, Scott Grieger, James Griffith, Steve Hurd, Bruce Nauman, Allen Ruppersberg, Coleen Sterritt, and John Valadez, among others.

=== Atmosphere ===
A cross between CBGB's and Cheers, considered this friendly underground bar Los Angeles' "last real rock 'n roll club", since it was one of the rare spots where bands "let loose and got wild". In 1982, the Downtown Breakfast Club awarded Al's Bar a Rose for being a great hangout.

=== Celebrity sightings ===
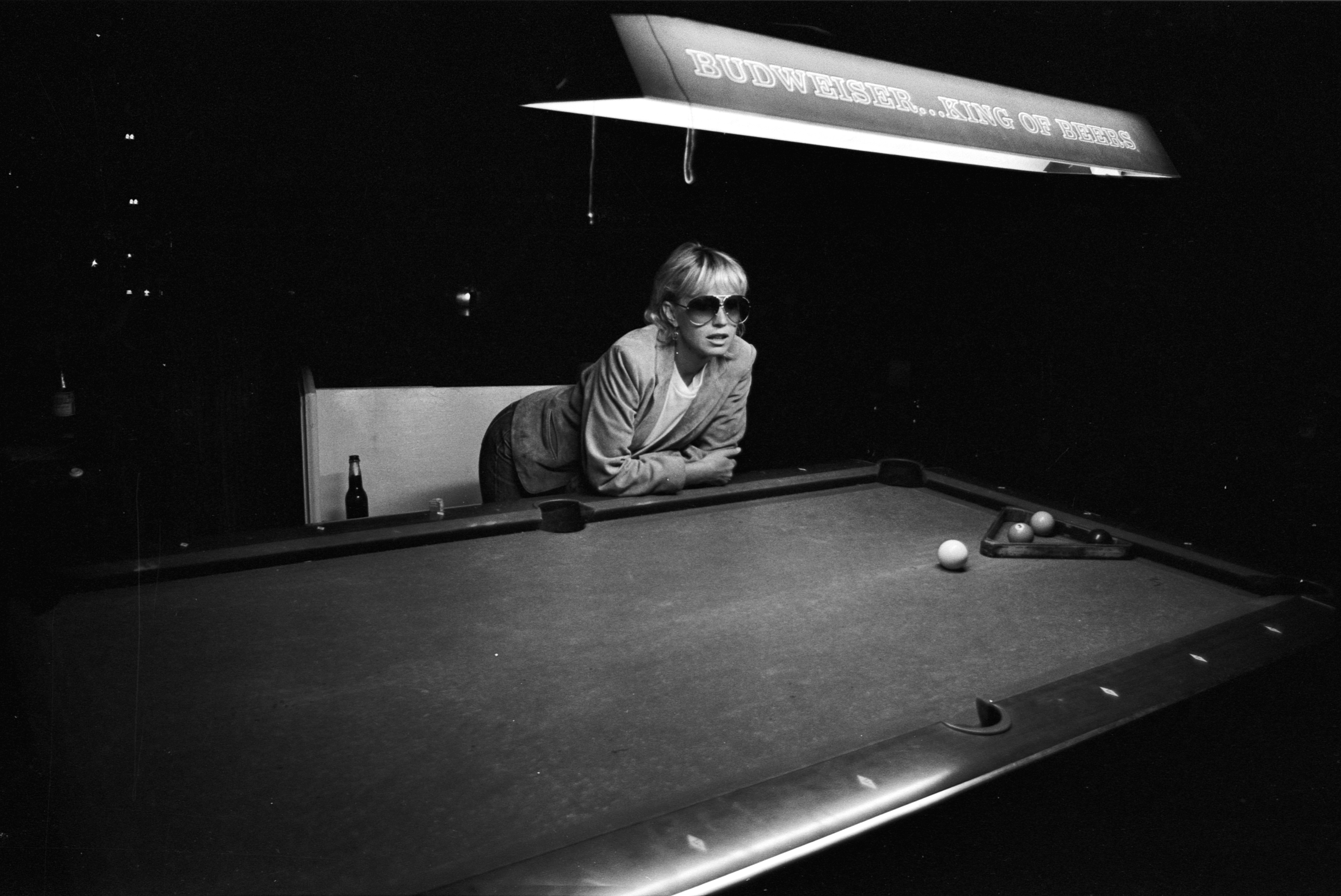
Bulle Ogier at Al's Bar

Within the first two years, Linda Ronstadt and Governor Jerry Brown dropped by to shoot pool. Writers like Bret Easton Ellis and actors Pierce Brosnan, Steve Buscemi, Stacy Keach, Pee-Wee Herman, Tommy Lee, Bill Murray, Judd Nelson, Al Pacino, Sean Penn, Chloë Sevigny stopped by.

== Underground music ==
For two decades, Al's Bar "survived" changes in musical fashion. Kreisel recalls "We had a policy back when I first opened where I would let people go to their emotional limits.""

Bands and singers that played there over the years included: L7, Beck, DNA/Arto Lindsay, Ry Cooder, The Fall, Fear, Hole, Hüsker Dü, Imperial Butt Wizards, Los Lobos, Social Distortion, Mighty Joe Young, Nirvana, Dayglo Abortions, NOFX, The Party Boys, The Residents, Sonic Youth, Urge Overkill, Screaming Bloody Marys, Wall of Voodoo, and Dwight Yoakam. According to Jim Freek, "It's nearly impossible to overestimate the importance of the club to unsigned and risk-taking bands."

While serving as a proving ground for out-of-town bands like Sonic Youth, the Residents, the Misfits, and Jesus Lizard, Al's Bar kept it current by booking local acts such as 400 Blows, Tadpole, Blues Experiment and Die Fast. Julie Ann Bachman of the hardcore trio Ballgagger recalls Al's Bar's having a female sound person, which helped a lot.

== Alternative Art Shows ==
In 1990, Marc Kreisel opened American Gallery adjacent the bar, where scores of artists exhibited their works. Sculptor Robert Gero had an exhibition at the American Gallery in 1990, while Raymond Pettibon, of Black-Flag cover art fame, exhibited drawings in Al's Bar in 1996, accompanied by seven punk-era bands. "Functionists High" (1990) featured works by nine mainstays of the Los Angeles scene, including Hans Burkhardt, Claire Falkenstein, Ynez Johnston, Helen Lundeberg, June Wayne, and Emerson Woelffer, was accompanied by a catalog essay written by Peter Plagens

== Al's Bar Records ==
The compilation album "Live at Al's Bar" was released in 1997. The same year saw "Al's Bar, What a Dive" Bands featured on the "Al's Bar, What a Dive" CD: Spent Idols, POPDeFECT, TVTV$, TouchCandy, Snair, Flourescein, Bottom 12, Texas Terri, The Humpers, Lutefisk, Extra Fancy, 1000 Mona Lisas, Mother Tongue. c1996 Recorded live at Al's Bar Oct / Nov 1995. Live mix by John Falzarano / Studio On Wheels. Post-Mix by John Bird at Parking Lot Studios.

== Al's National Theater Company ==
In addition to hosting original theater, Al's Bar's hosted a weekly "No Talent Night" that enabled poets, actors, musicians, and magicians to try out new material.
