= Wholesale District, Los Angeles =

Neighborhood in Downtown Los Angeles

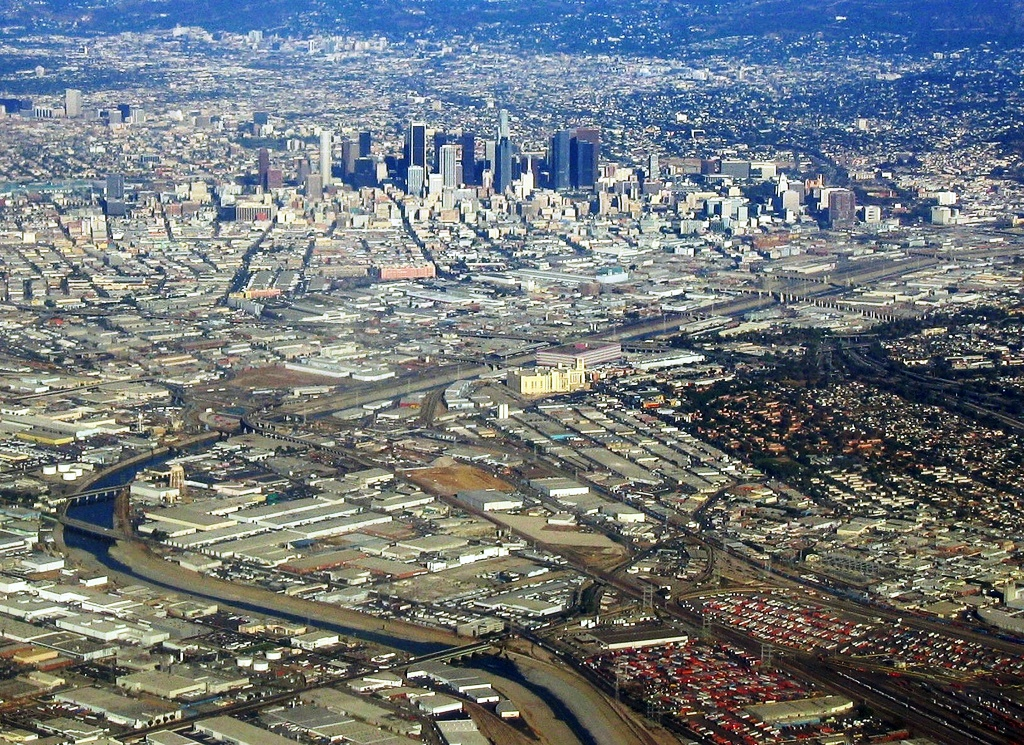
The Wholesale District lies across the middle of this 2009 photograph, above the Los Angeles River and below Downtown Los Angeles

The Wholesale District or Warehouse District in Downtown Los Angeles, California, has no exact boundaries, but at present it lies along the BNSF and Union Pacific Railroad lines, which run parallel with Alameda Street and the Los Angeles River. Except for some ancillary commercial uses, its cityscape is mostly occupied by warehouses and refrigerated storage facilities. This area is known as Central City North in the Los Angeles city zoning map.

In early days, Los Angeles Street, to the west, was considered the "heart" of the Wholesale District, which over the years expanded southerly along the same thoroughfare, and, to a lesser extent, northward. Warehouse buildings were also constructed on Alameda Street, and plans were made for a new center at First and Alameda, but it was never brought to fruition. Warehouses were built on San Pedro Street and on Central Avenue. Eventually the district spread farther on the east side of Downtown, and by 1990 it was described as being bounded by San Pedro Street, the Los Angeles River, First Street and the Santa Monica Freeway .

== The traditional center ==
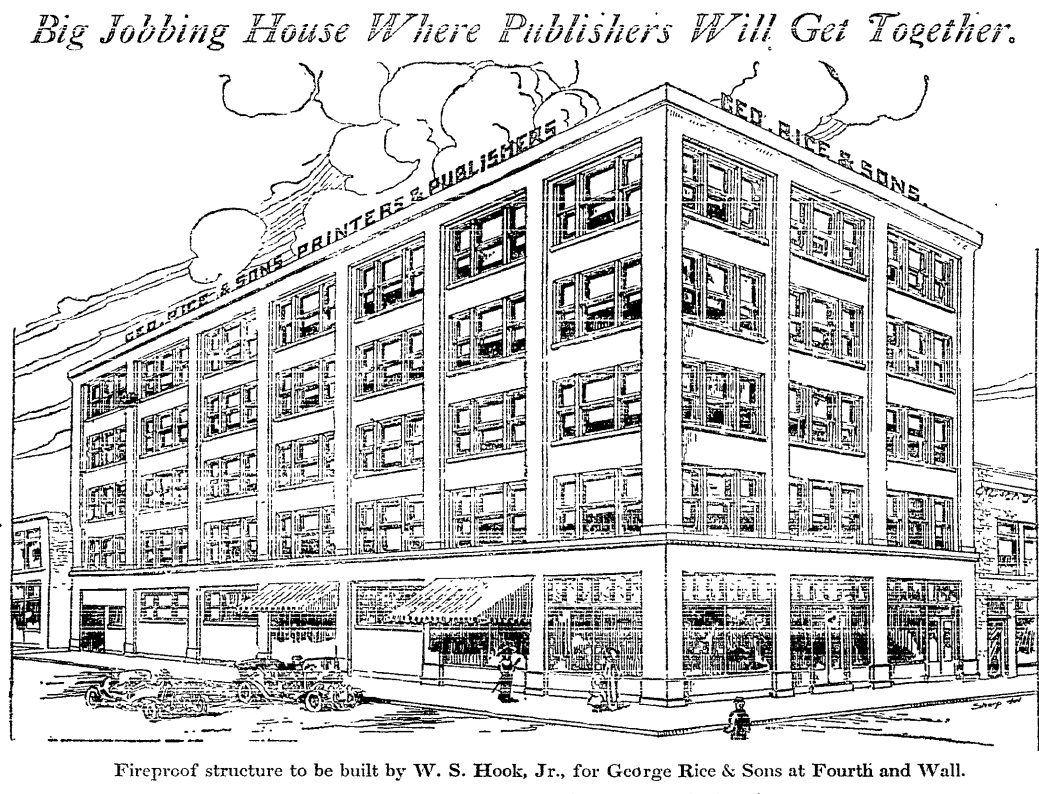
This six-story building for the publishing industry was planned for the heart of the District at East Fourth and Wall streets in 1911

1898–1902. The "wholesale business quarter" of Los Angeles was centered on Los Angeles Street around First and Second streets, New buildings were constructed in the existing Wholesale District over the next years, including one at 147-149 North Los Angeles Street for the Davenport Company, dealer in agricultural implements and heavy hardware; the American Notion building at 131–133; the E.P. Bosbyshell building at 125–129, occupied by S.J. Smith and his pumps and pumping machinery; and a building on the west side of the street for two wholesale houses, one of which was to be the Zellerbach & Son paper company. A three-story building was constructed between Second and Third streets for the Standard Woodenware Company and John Wigmore and Sons Company — said to be "one of the best equipped wholesale buildings in Southern California."

1910-11. Construction included the six-story W.H. Perry Building on the southeast corner of Second and Los Angeles street and the H.W Hellman building on Second Street in 1910. It was said then that the District would naturally be extended to the east, and indeed in 1911 plans were announced to build a $100,000 building on the northeast corner of East Fourth and Wall streets, strictly for the printing and publishing businesses. In 1911 notice was made of new buildings for the P.H. Mathews Paint Company, the Pioneer Roll Paper Company, the Klein-Norton Company, the Golden State Shoe Company, the Stewart-Dawes Shoe Company, all moving into new buildings of their own, and all on Los Angeles Street.

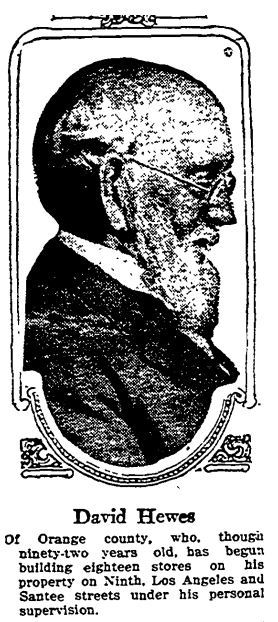
Hewes, 1913

Plans were announced in September 1911 for the construction of a five-story building on the northwest corner of Second and Alameda streets, to be occupied by Haas-Baruch and Company in "one of the largest and most modern wholesale grocery companies in the West. Architects were Morgan, Walls & Morgan.

1912. Warehouse District structures had spread farther south on Los Angeles Street. One of the largest leases ever concluded in the District, up to then, was for a fireproof seven-story-plus-basement building on the east side of Los Angeles between Seventh and Eighth streets. The Los Angeles Times opined: "The project marks another link in the chain of modern fireproof buildings erected on Los Angeles Street in the past two years."

1913. Landowner David Hewes of Orange, California, announced plans to expand the District to the entire block from Los Angeles Street, where he contracted with the Willard-Slater Company to build twelve stores, to Santee Street between Eighth Street and Ninth Street, where he was planning six more. He said that increased traffic to Los Angeles through the newly opened Panama Canal was one of the reasons he predicted success for his venture. Hr had already placed Hewes Market at Ninth and Los Angeles, where it became one of the busiest corners in the city.

It was noted that dozens of auto repair garages and machine shops lined Los Angeles Street between First and Tenth.

1917. Los Angeles Street between Seventh and Eighth streets was regarded as "the center of the wholesale dry goods and apparel business in this city, as well as for light manufacturing of those and kindred lines." At that time it was announced that "The biggest structural enterprise yet launched in the wholesale and jobbing district" would go ahead with two ten-floor fireproof loft buildings to be erected by M.J. Connell at the corner of Seventh and Santee.

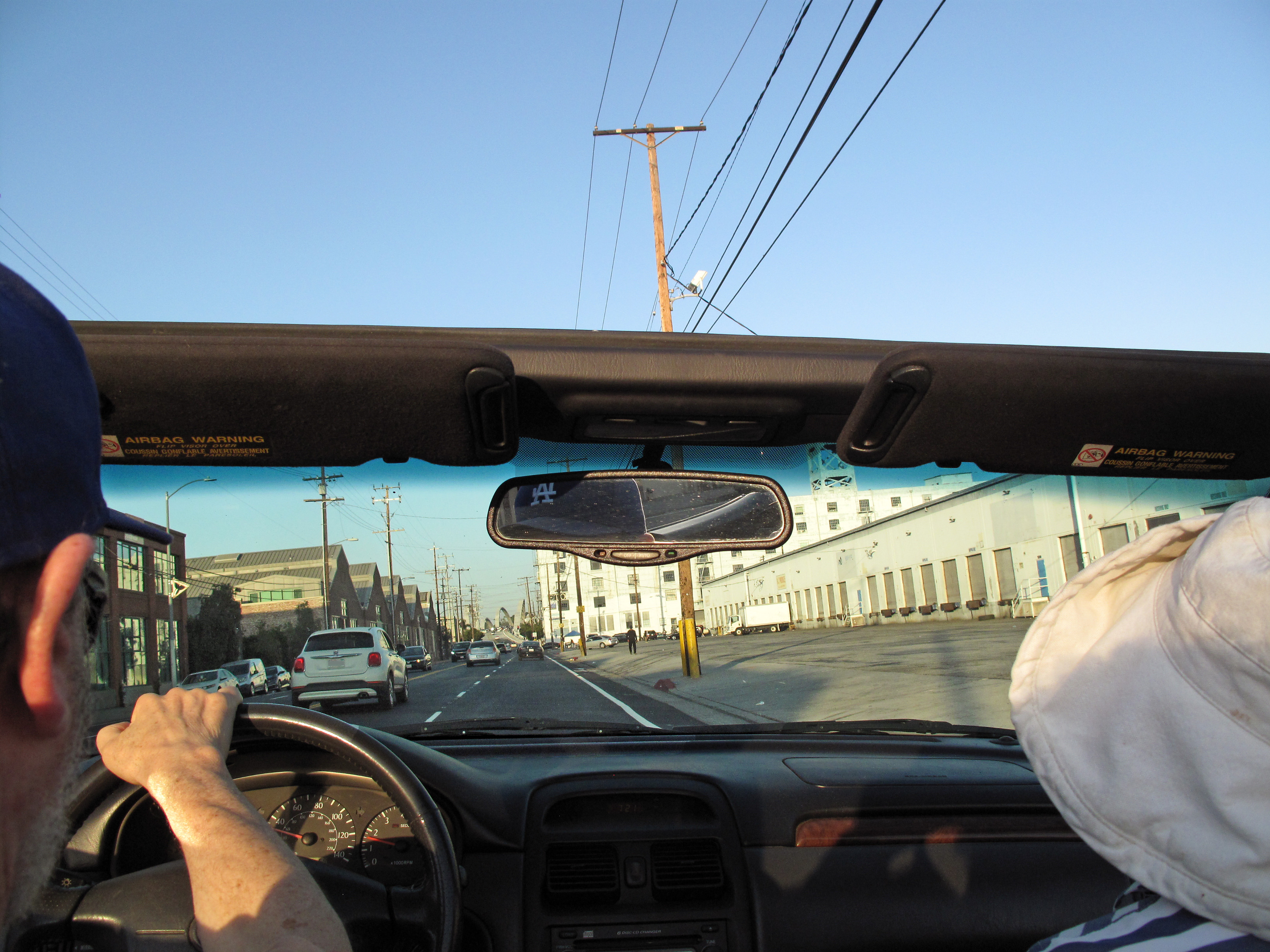
View of wholesale buildings on both sides of 6th Street as automobile heads toward the new 6th Street bridge, July 2022.

1992. The Warehouse District was described as "a realm of cinder block and sheet metal, a bleak landscape" that lay from San Pedro Street on the west to the Los Angeles River on the east and from First Street on the north to the Santa Monica Freeway on the south.

== Expansion ==
=== First and Alameda ===
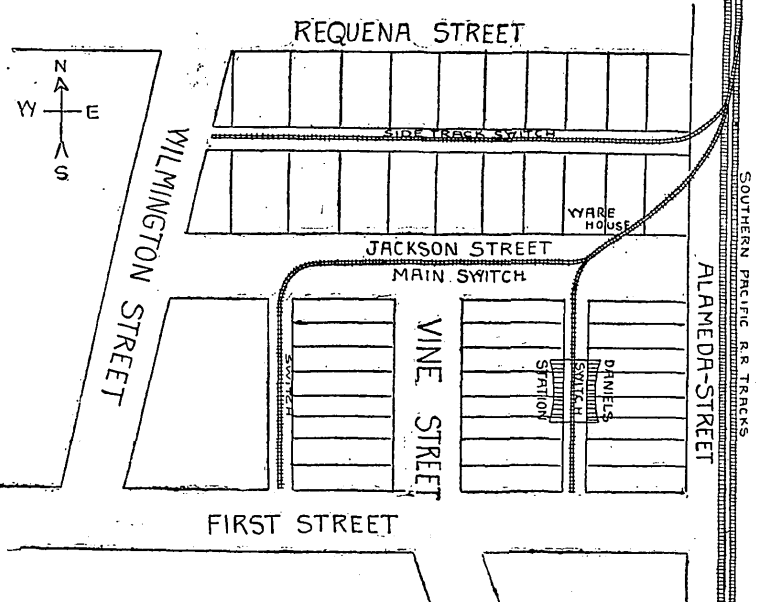
Plan for an extension of the Warehouse District to a new area, 1899

1898–99. In 1898 an entrepreneur named A.E. Weeks had gathered enough properties from some thirty to forty owners to announce his plans to build a new wholesale center of four blocks on the west side of Alameda Street and the west side of Vine Street between First and Jackson streets and on the north and south sides of Jackson between Alameda and Wilmington streets. The purchase price was "well up toward a million dollars," and the sale was made to P.M. Daniel of the Pacific Crockery and Tinware Company, president of the Los Angeles Board of Trade, who was presumed to be representing other investors as well as himself. Buildings on the site were to be leveled, and "fine business blocks adapted to the need of wholesale houses" would be constructed in such a way that the Southern Pacific Railroad would have access to the Alameda frontage for easy loading and unloading of goods. The idea for such a district was taken from a similar project in St. Louis, Missouri, and its backers stressed the advantage for Los Angeles merchants in competing with San Francisco in Northern California. It was said also that the new center would "enable the Southern Pacific Railroad to place its cars at the very doors of the various wholesale houses, and the saving to the trade of this city will run into hundreds of thousands of dollars per year as a result of dispensing with drayage." The destruction of some sixty cottages and tenement houses was envisioned. A lumber yard had to be removed from First and Alameda to a new location near the La Grande depot

A Los Angeles Times opinion article on January 6, 1899, however, argued against completion of the project, which would redound to the advantage of the Southern Pacific as opposed to its rival Santa Fe Railroad. The Times stated that the "proper place" for a new wholesale district would be between the Southern Pacific's Arcade Depot and the Santa Fe depot in the Palmetto Street-Santa Fe Avenue area because "The tracks of the two companies are only about 1700 feet apart there, so that switches could easily be made into warehouses."

The plan envisioned freight cars being brought from the Southern Pacific line on Alameda Street into the new center, where "a force of clerks" would work in a station office named Daniel, in honor of P.M. Daniel, the author of the enterprise. This center was to be shared by both the Southern Pacific and the Santa Fe railroads. Nevertheless, the plan unraveled, and by July 1899 the scheme had apparently been abandoned because Daniel "found it impossible to capitalize the project."

1905. An increase in the cost of Los Angeles Street property was said to be the impetus for the expansion of the Wholesale District in 1905 along East First and Alameda streets, helped by a decision of the Santa Fe Company to build a switch track on Banning Street.

=== San Pedro Street ===
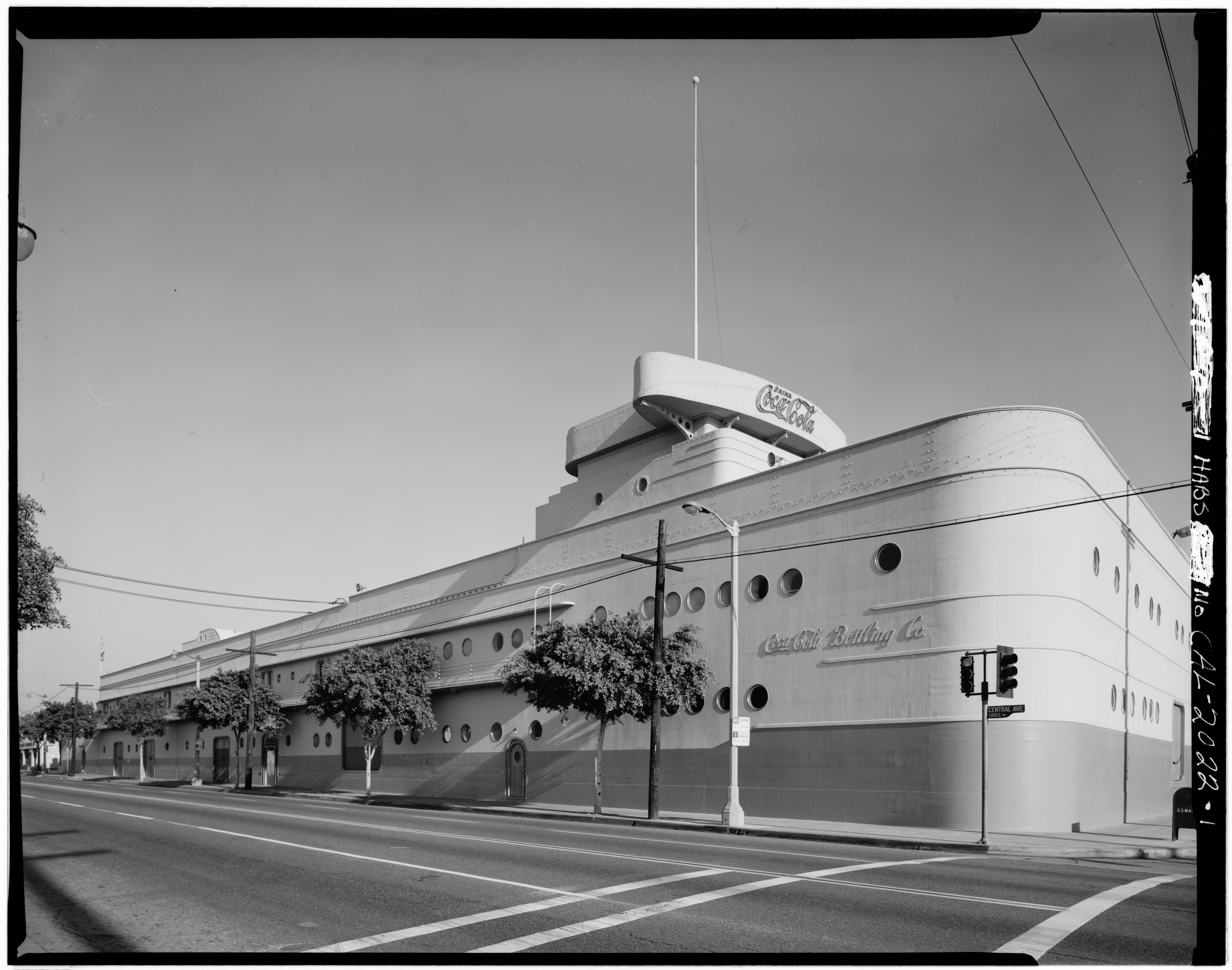
Coca-Cola bottling plant on Central Avenue, as seen in the 1970s

1904. The "congested condition of traffic on Los Angeles street, in the wholesale districts, and the fact that this class of business cannot well move westward on Main street" impelled the City Council in December 1904, by a vote of 4 to 3, to order the reconstruction, straightening and widening of San Pedro Street (a portion of which had historically been known as Wilmington Street) to eighty feet across in order to provide new opportunities for business growth. The job also provided for an entirely new "highway" from Fifth Street to Aliso Street.

They would have to take out my dead body before getting possession of this place . ... Have a street run through [it]? Never! Why they'd have to chop my head off before I would cease to protest.

The plan was opposed by some longtime property owners, in part because two landmarks were marked for destruction — a two-story residence owned by Mrs. M.A. Woodworth on San Pedro "where for more than a quarter century the hospitality of old Spanish families has been dispensed, and which for many years was the center of much of the social activity of the city." A contemporary account noted that "Around the Woodworth home there are beautiful grounds, and a really refreshing oasis in the desert of brick walls, dingy store fronts and shabby buildings in the neighborhood. One of the most prized features of the grounds is a noble magnolia tree, notable for the profusion of its waxy flowers, and flanked to the eastward with a row of stately fan palms. These all must go down before the march of commercial supremacy." Also to be sacrificed was a 100-year-old adobe house that had been occupied by the Spanish and Mexican pioneer Lugo family, which for three generations had been maintained as a "typical Spanish-American home." It had been built by Mrs. Woodworth's grandfather, Don Antonio Manuel Lugo.

1925. San Pedro Street was noted as the "principal north and south artery" of the wholesale district when a six-story building was completed at East Sixth Street for the City Towel Supply Corporation, with a portion to be leased to wholesale and manufacturing companies.

=== Central Avenue ===
1905. "The greatest wholesale and jobbing plant ever undertaken in the Southwest — a whole city block devoted to one firm's building and trackage" was promised in May 1905 for the Los Angeles Wholesale District in an area bounded by East First Street, Jackson Street, North Central Avenue and Alameda Street. The property had a frontage of 700 feet on Alameda Street, where the Southern Pacific tracks lay. Architects Morgan & Walls promised two four-story brick buildings with plate glass for the first story and a main entrance of polished marble and oak. Ancillary buildings were also planned for the Union Hardware and Metal Company.

1905. In August 1905, the Los Angeles Herald reported that the Wholesale District had expanded beyond the confines of Los Angeles Street, particularly with the completion of a two-story building on the west side of Central Avenue between Second and Third streets, which was to be occupied by Simon Levi, produce and grocery dealer, and the California Door and Sash Company. The structure indicated the "high class of permanent structures" being raised near the Central Market, the newspaper said.

1936. A Coca-Cola bottling plant, shaped like an ocean liner, was built at 1334 South Central Avenue in 1936.

=== Third Street area ===
1912. In April 1912 the definition of the Wholesale District spread farther east when plans were announced for the construction of a fireproof warehouse, the largest in the city, by F.W. Braun on Avery Street between Third Street and Stephenson Avenue.

== Police and crime ==
=== Police ===
The District is patrolled by the Central Division of the Los Angeles Police Department.

=== Crime ===
Criminal activity has been the topic of public interest.

1889–1902. The area was categorized as a "sink of iniquity" because of asserted prostitution as well as the existence of "dives which are allowed to flourish in the center of the wholesale district on Los Angeles Street."

The Manhattan Club, just across the way from the Republican Club, is the same sort of dive, with the exception that it is given to the cultivation of pugilism rather than politics . ... Both places are provided with bars, for which they pay no taxes to the city. Both are sinks of iniquity, where the dregs of society of both sexes and all colors congregate nightly to indulge in unbridled vice. Occasionally the police arrest some of the women who frequent these dives, but no serious effort has ever been made to prevent the orgies, which are of nightly occurrence.

The Manhattan Club was described as a place where "negroes, tough whites, white and colored prostitutes assembled, caroused, drank, gambled and worse until even the merchants on that street, who are never there at night, demanded that it be closed, and it was closed. . . . A uniformed officer was stationed at the door, and no matter who entered, his or her name was taken. Tough as were the patrons of the place they did not like the idea of the police keeping tab on them and the result was that" the business was ruined and the club was closed.

1992. In November 1992 the Los Angeles Times published a lengthy article whose headline described the Warehouse District as "the underbelly" of Los Angeles, a "concrete jungle" that was "rife with transients who pillage businesses on eerie nighttime raids." Reporter David Farrell wrote that "burglars clamber from one building to the next in search of air vents, attic doors, any place they can break in. There are petty bonanzas to reap: stereos, shoes, tomatoes and oranges by the crate--anything they can sell for crack cocaine." He called the District a "realm of cinder block and sheet metal, a landscape hard by the concrete shore of the Los Angeles River." Prostitution was rampant, both male and female, and residents lived through theft and by doing odd jobs for little pay. Business owners reported spending thousands of dollars for protection like security guards, video cameras, iron fences and concertina wire, only to have them soon circumvented by thieves, who quickly offered stolen goods for sale on the sidewalks or elsewhere in the District.

== Fires ==
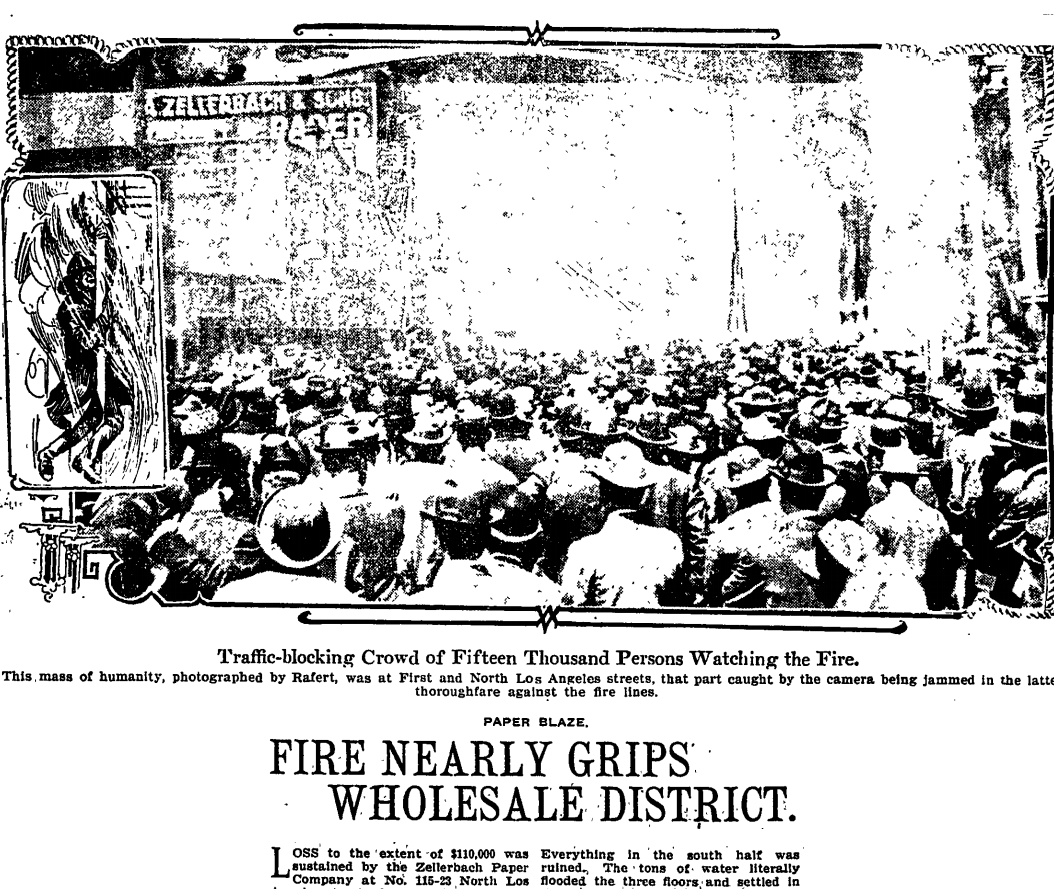
Los Angeles Times coverage of Zellerbach fire, 1909. Drawing at the left shows fireman Oscar Jones escaping from the flames by way of a fire hose

The history of the Wholesale District was marked by a number of notable fires, particularly in the late 19th and early 20th centuries.

1898. The Germain Building, which housed the wholesale department store of Crandall, Aylsworth & Haskell at 218-224 North Los Angeles Street, was gutted and the store of the Pacific Crockery and Tinware Co. at No. 228 was "almost totally ruined" in a fierce blaze on May 28, 1898, when the fire department had to sound a general alarm, "calling every company in the department to the scene" for the first time in more than a year. The fire began in a pile of excelsior used in packing goods. Workers attempted to quench the blaze with a hose, but in vain, so an alarm was sent from a fire alarm call box on Requena Street. A contemporary account reported:

... the heat was so great that it was not possible for the firemen to enter the building [so] ... lines of hose were stretched to the tops of adjacent buildings, and wherever there was an opening through which water could be directed, a stream was poured into the burning structure. ... The large Babcock truck was placed directly in front of the building, and the aerial ladder was raised. On this two streams were placed, and they poured water into the two upper floors of the building, ... [and yet] the fire spread through the building until the whole interior was like a furnace ... Half an hour after the fire started[,] the part of the south wall which extended over the top of the building ... fell. Among the thousands of persons who blocked the streets in front of the building, the cry went up that there was a fire company caught under that wall. Instantly there was a rush made of other firemen and scores of citizens in the place eager to render any assistance possible. The alarm was groundless, however, for the men who were working under the wall had seen it swaying and had stepped back just in time to escape being crushed under the falling mass of bricks.

The owner of the Pacific Crockery and Tinware Company next to the burning building refused to allow firemen to fight the blaze from the interior of his store, so the men had to retire. Then the north wall of the building collapsed and smashed through the roof of the Crockery and Tinware Company's store, "setting it on fire in fifty places." The wholesale wool house of S. Phillips caught ablaze, but the flames were extinguished. The stock of the crockery store was destroyed as the fire fighters were forced to combat the flames leaping up in huge piles of packing cases filled with straw. The financial losses to the merchants were heavy.

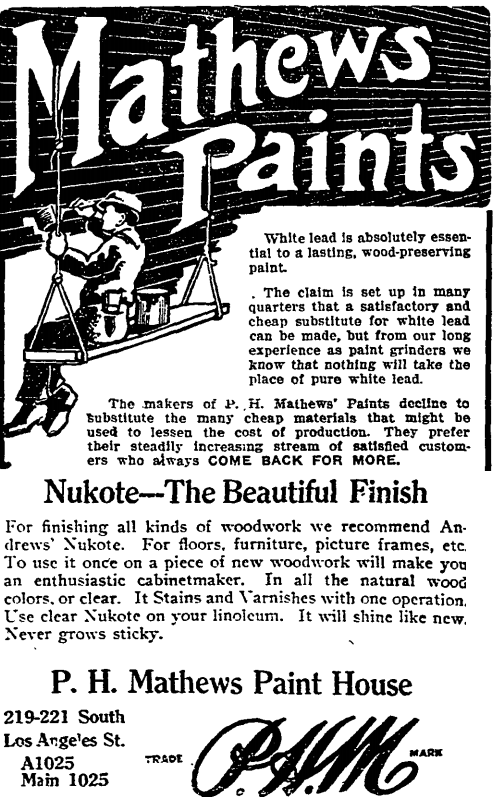
A massive fire destroyed the P.H. Mathews building in May 1907

1904. George Stoll & Company, a large wholesale business dealing in coffee, tea and spices at 447-449 Los Angeles Street, escaped destruction on February 2, 1904, when either sparks from a roaster or a "lighted cigar stump" ignited a pile of packing cases but the flames were extinguished by firefighters, "some of them crawling along the floor with a line of hose" to the rear of the building. At the same time, another fire broke out in the coffee departrment of the R.L. Craig Co. on Los Angeles Street near First Street, also in the Wholesale District. That one was caused by an overheated coffee roaster, and it was quickly extinguished.

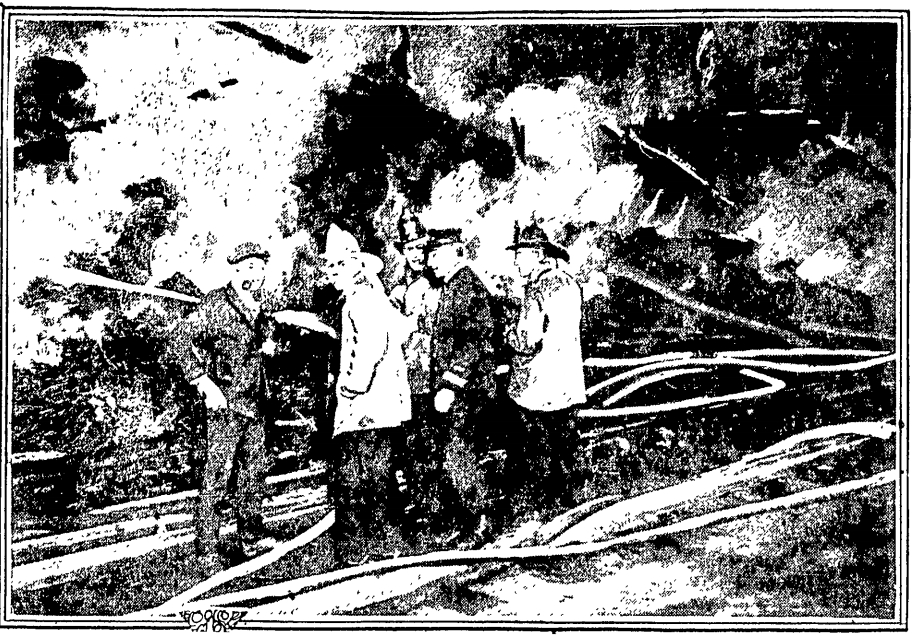
Firemen amid a tangle of hoses at a 1921 fire that gutted the Pacific Wood and Coal Company on Seventh Street

1906. Arsonists were suspected in a blaze that broke out in a new two-story addition at the rear of Standard Woodenware at 230-234 Los Angeles Street on February 18, 1906. The firebox alarm was pulled by a passing police officer, but help was slow to arrive because most of the nearby engine companies were fighting another fire at Fifth and Main streets. Two men, reportedly night watchmen, were sleeping inside. and were discovered only after firemen began tearing off a grating at the rear of the building. Nearby businesses that were briefly endangered were the Club Stables, with 50 horses, Hawley & King farm-implement house, the Cohn-Goldwater machine house and the S.J. Smith manufactory. Police officers were brought in from other areas, and a dragnet was made of "suspects and all characters" who could not "explain their movements." and they were brought in "for explanation."

1906. A two-story brick building occupied by the Holbrook, Merrill and Stetson Hardware Company, which took up nearly half the south side of the 200 block of Los Angeles Street, was severely damaged in a three-alarm fire in the early-morning hours of June 20, 1906. A newspaper account reported that "The female inmates of places nearby had a big scare. They took to the streets in their light attire and refused to re-enter their rooms for a long time. . . . Five companies responded . . . and two more as soon as they could make the run to the wholesale district."

1906. Ladderman Adolph Hermanson was killed on December 29, 1906, while he was fighting a massive fire in the Cohn, Goldsmith & Co. building at 210-222 South Los Angeles Street. He was hurled from a fifth-floor window when a jet of water struck him. "Wooden goods and haberdashery comprised the building's stock," the Los Angeles Times reported. "The structure itself was far from fireproof. The [fire] department was faced with the same proposition a man would have who must extinguish a bolt of burning wool with a tin dipper." The building was gutted. Damaged businesses in nearby buildings were S. J. Smith Machinery Manufacturing Company, B.F. Kieruiff Company electric switchboard manufacturer, Pacific Wire and Steel Company and Fullerton Iron Works.

1907. A fire almost gutted a building at 256-260 South Los Angeles Street, occupied by the P.H. Mathews Paint Company and the Wholesale Drug Company, but a water tower on the block saved the other buildings on the block from damage. The flames started on a lower floor but shot up an elevator shaft to the upper floors. The fire was first reported by a patrolman of the Merchants' Fire Dispatch, who sent an alarm over a private telephone line connected directly to Fire Department headquarters, from whence Chief [Walter] Lips led a team toward the incident. Seeing the extent of the flames before even arriving on scene, he stopped the horses and sent in a second and third alarm from a fire-alarm box; this precaution brought more men to the site to battle the blaze and saved the other buildings on the block. It was noted that during the preceding five years the block, "in the very heart of the wholesale district," had been struck by four very serious fires.

1908. On June 4, 1908, flames began on the top floor of the three-story Phillips Printing Company at 354 South Los Angeles Street, on the corner of Boyd Street, apparently from crossed electrical wires, and by the time firemen arrived, the conflagration was so hot the men had to work in relays. All the contents of the building seemed to be lost, including, it was feared, the manuscript of the forthcoming Los Angeles City Directory. The quarters and stock of the Pacific Garment Company, in the same building, were ravaged.

1909. Driven by high winds from the mountains, a blaze in the headquarters of the Zellerbach Paper Company at 115-23 North Los Angeles Street threatened to spread to adjoining buildings on April 6, 1909, and "the heart of the great wholesale district was in danger." The damage to the Zellerbach building was lessened by the presence of a large fire wall running between the east and west walls of the building, but "everything on the south half was ruined," a contemporary account read. "Within twenty minutes . . . A crowd of 15,000 had collected. East First Street was packed with humanity. Los Angeles street toward the north was a swaying, jostling mass. Ropes were brought and a squad of police detailed to keep back the spectators. The race-track [street]cars were stalled and the hundreds of passengers watched the fire until notified that cars had been stationed at Los Angeles and Commercial streets."

Five firemen had a narrow escape ... Chief Lips and four assistants were playing a hose through the broken window when the flames took a new tack and swept over them. The Chief and three men escaped down the ladder. Oscar Jones of Company No. 6 wa driven to a corner of the platform, and cut off from the ladder by a sheet of flame. He jumped to a near-by line of hose which had been carried to the roof and escaped by sliding to the ground. He was singed about the head and face. The immense crowd cheered him as he lowered himself by means of the hose.

1921. A spectacular fire on the evening of March 17 sent "a mighty shaft of flame" into the sky and destroyed a warehouse belonging to the Pacific Wood and Coal Company on Seventh Street at the Santa Fe Railroad tracks. Carloads of coal, coke, wood, hay, grain, poultry supplies and distillate went up in smoke, as did six "automobile trucks." Firefighters escaped serious injuries in the general-alarm fire when a burning wall collapsed upon them, but they "quickly extricated themselves uninjured from the mass of debris and continued with their work." The company, which had offices in Los Angeles and San Diego, was one of the largest firms of its kind in Southern California.

1967. Three fires within four nights broke out in December 1966 and January 1967 in an 11-block area in the Mission Road district. Losses were suffered by Charles Weinreich Ltd, packer and exporter of rags and used clothing at 310 Souith Mission Road, by the Empire Bag and Carton Company at 1491 East Fourth Street and by the Wilbur-Ellis chemical fertilizer company building at 453 North Mission Road, which was destroyed. Arson was suspected.

== Explosion ==
1997. Four workers were killed and at least 25 others injured when a machine exploded with a powerful blast at the Imperial Toy Corporation factory at East 7th Street and Santa Fe Avenue and blew a hole through the roof of a building that had been built in 1913 by Henry Ford to be his first California auto plant.

2020. On May 16, a fire at a smoke shop warehouse on so-called "bong row" (300 block of Boyd St.) turned into an explosion when "excessive quantities" of improperly stored butane and nitrous oxide ignited. The explosion injured 12 firefighters, several of them "severely." Criminal charges were brought against the two business owners, but were dropped after they pled guilty. Their company was found guilty of four municipal code violations. LAFD revealed they had never inspected the building. If inspected, the inflammable materials would likely have been removed according to Fire Chief Ralph M. Terrazas.

== See also ==
- Central Business District, Los Angeles (1880–1899)
