= Charles Kanner =

American architect (c. 1920–1988)

Charles G. Kanner
- Born: 1930 or 1931; St. Louis, Missouri, U.S.
- Died: 1998 (aged 67); Santa Monica, California
- Occupation: Architect
- Practice: Kanner Associates

Charles G. Kanner was an architect in Los Angeles. He was the second generation owner of Kanner Associates, founded by his father Herman Kanner in 1946. His son Stephen Kanner later took over the firm. Kanner was born in St. Louis, Missouri, and studied architecture at the University of Southern California. He served in the United States Air Force.

The company completed many commercial projects from bowling centers to shoe stores during the 1950s and 60s, often in the googie style . They restored historic buildings in Los Angeles including Holmby Hall near University of California Los Angeles in Westwood Village, Los Angeles, California. and also advised mayors Tom Bradley and Richard Riordan on redevelopment projects. Kanner served as president of the Southern California Chapter of the American Institute of Architects. Los Angeles Times architecture critic described Kanner's firm as a “highly personal practice” creating scrupulously crafted projects.” Comparing the firm to more famous “starchitects,” Whiteson described them as part of a “ ” creating everyday buildings that “set the style for much of what is being built around us”

Kanner also advised Los Angeles mayors Tom Bradley and Richard Riordan on redevelopment projects. Kanner served as president of the Southern California Chapter of the American Institute of Architects. He was elected a fellow of the AIA in 1979.

Kanner was inspired by architects of the Bauhaus school and Los Angeles modernists Richard Neutra and Rudolph Schindler. His work is included in the book Pop Architecture edited by Frances Anderton.

Kanner died of pancreatic cancer in Santa Monica, California in 1998 at the age of 67
