= A+D Museum =

Architecture and design museum in Los Angeles

Coordinates: 34.06266°N 118.3605°W

The A+D Museum is a museum of architecture and design located in the Downtown Los Angeles Arts District at 900 E 4th Street. Designer and educator Natasha Sandmeier serves as the museum's executive director and Camille Elston is the managing director.

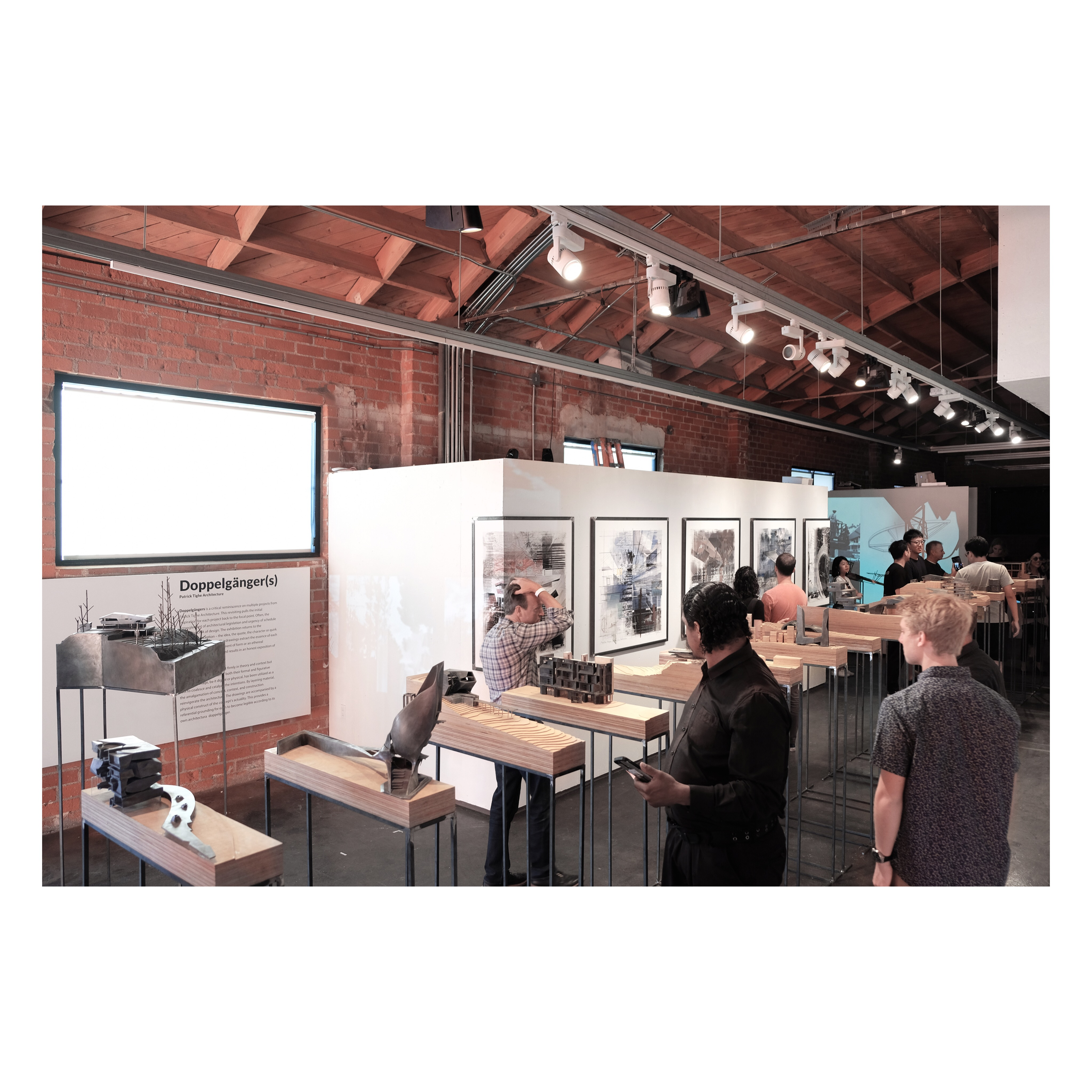
Opening the museum in 2018

== History ==
A+D Museum was founded by Stephen Kanner and Bernard Zimmerman in 2001. Kanner was inspired by a similar museum he had visited in Helsinki, Finland.

The museum first opened its doors in January 2001 in the Bradbury Building, located at 304 South Broadway (3rd Street and Broadway) in downtown Los Angeles; a space donated by Ira Yellin. When the Bradbury building was sold in 2003 the museum moved to a temporary location on the Sunset Strip in West Hollywood. In 2006 it moved to 5900 Wilshire Boulevard; across the street from the Los Angeles County Museum of Art. In April 2010, the museum moved down the street to 6032 Wilshire Boulevard. Displaced by the extension of the Metro Purple Line, A+D Museum returned to downtown Los Angeles to a former warehouse in the Arts District in the summer of 2015.
