= Andy Wilf =

American painter (1949–1982)

- Born: August 25, 1949; Los Angeles, California, US
- Died: January 17, 1982 (aged 32); Malibu, California, US
- Education: Long Beach City College; Otis College of Art and Design extension program
- Known for: Painting, murals, drawing
- Movement: Photorealism
- Awards: Modern and Contemporary Arts Council’s Young Talent Purchase Award

Andy Wilf (August 25, 1949 – January 17, 1982) was a Los-Angeles based painter whose artistic practice consisted of drawing, painting and murals.

== Early life and career ==
In 1960, he painted murals of California history on the walls of Wilson Elementary School in Lynwood. Between 1968 and 1972, he took courses at Compton College, Long Beach City College, and Otis Art Institute, but he never earned a degree. In 1975, the Comsky Gallery in Beverly Hills gave him his first solo exhibition. In early 1977, he spent six weeks helping D. J. Hall paint a 16-by-50-foot billboard at the corner of Santa Monica and La Cienega boulevards. In 1978, he moved into the building on South Broadway where High Performance magazine had its headquarters, which inspired him to paint images of performance artists like Hermann Nitsch, Rudolf Schwarzkogler, Stephen Seemayer, and Barbara T. Smith, whose actions the magazine featured. By 1980, he was painting still lifes using slaughtered animals retrieved from a Grand Central Market butcher. For his 1981 solo exhibition at the newly opened Ulrike Kantor Gallery, he showed neo-expressionist "meat paintings" alongside earlier works, which led to his becoming the 49th recipient of the Modern and Contemporary Arts Council's Young Talent Purchase Award, which carried a purse of $3000 and an exhibition at the Los Angeles County Museum of Art.

== Exhibition highlights ==
Before his death at age 32, Wilf had already had four solo exhibitions in commercial galleries, as well as solo exhibitions at LACE and Los Angeles Institute for Contemporary Art (LAICA). His work had been included in dozens of group shows such as the 1975 Whitney Biennial, Newport Harbor Art Museum, Los Angeles Municipal Art Gallery, Long Beach Museum of Art, Mandeville Art Gallery, Oakland Museum, as well as commercial galleries: Allan Frumkin Gallery, Ulrike Kantor, and L.A. Louver.

Former LACMA curator Maurice Tuchman wrote "[Wilf's] late paintings –the meat still lifes, raw and emotional exclamations which brought him renown— were the result of years of patient work in another, much more subdued manner…. This modest show should not preclude a large retrospective at some future date". His 1980 painting Judged is in the Los Angeles County Museum of Art Collection.
