= Coleen Sterritt =

American sculptor

- Born: 1953 (age 72–73); Morris, Illinois, US
- Education: University of Illinois at Urbana-Champaign; Otis College of Art & Design
- Known for: Sculpture, assemblage art
- Awards: John Simon Guggenheim Fellowship, City of Los Angeles Sculpture Award, J. Paul Getty Trust Fund for the Visual Arts
- Website: Coleen Sterritt

Coleen Sterritt (born 1953) is an American sculptor known for abstracted, hybrid works made from a myriad of everyday objects and materials, combined in unexpected ways. Writers root her work in the tradition of post-minimalists Jackie Winsor, Eva Hesse and Nancy Graves, and assemblage artists such as Louise Nevelson, Robert Rauschenberg and Marisa Merz; she is sometimes associated with contemporaries Jessica Stockholder, Nancy Rubins, and Tony Cragg. Sculpture critic Kay Whitney suggests Sterritt's work "expands and reinterprets three of the most important artistic inventions of the 20th Century—collage, abstraction and the readymade"— in play with the traditions of Arte Povera bricolage and Surrealist psychological displacement. Curator Andi Campognone considers Sterritt one of the most influential post-1970s artists in establishing "the Los Angeles aesthetic" in contemporary sculpture, while others identify her as an inspiration for later West Coast artists creating hand-made, free-standing sculpture counter to trends toward interventions, public art and environmental works. Constance Mallinson writes that Sterritt's work "walks a line between charm and threat, the natural, the industrial and the hand fabricated, rejecting easy associations for complex reads." Los Angeles Times critic David Pagel calls it smart, funky and "subtly rebellious" in its refashioning of discarded material, dumpster finds, and art-historical lineages.

Coleen Sterritt, Endear, Fixall, shellac, steel, tar, straw, 126" x 129" x 54", 1987.

Sterritt has exhibited throughout the United States, in Japan, Spain, Kenya and South Africa, and in major shows at the Museum of Contemporary Art, Los Angeles, Los Angeles Contemporary Exhibitions (LACE), Los Angeles Institute of Contemporary Art (LAICA), and Los Angeles Municipal Art Gallery, among many venues. In 2016, she was named a John Simon Guggenheim Fine Arts Fellowship recipient. Sterritt's work is featured in several public art collections and the books American Women Sculptors: A History of Women Working in Three Dimensions and L.A. Rising: SoCal Artists Before 1980. In 2018, Griffith Moon published the retrospective catalogue, Coleen Sterritt: 1977–2017, in collaboration with the Lancaster Museum of Art and History (MOAH). Sterritt is based in the Los Angeles area.

== Life and career ==
Sterritt was born in Morris, Illinois in 1953 and grew up in Chicago. Her early influences were her grandmother, Dorothy Button, a well-known local gardener and her uncle, James A. Sterritt, a sculptor and educator, who co-founded the 1960s casting conferences at the University of Kansas that later became the International Sculpture Center. Sterritt studied at the University of Illinois, Urbana-Champaign (BFA, 1976), where she created sculpture influenced by Jackie Winsor, Eva Hesse, and feminist theory. In 1977, she moved to Los Angeles to attend Otis Art Institute (MFA, 1979), where she studied with Betye Saar and Germano Celant, and was introduced to the work of Arte Povera and the California assemblage artists.

In 1979, Sterritt rented a large studio in a deserted Los Angeles industrial building, helping to pioneer a burgeoning downtown art scene. She also worked at the newly opened Al's Bar, a key cultural hub of the time. As a woman sculptor whose work ran counter to the era's dominant, almost exclusively male, Minimalist aesthetic, Sterritt embraced the openness of the Los Angeles scene, which was less burdened by male-dominated history and mainstream orthodoxies, exhibiting at museums, non-profit spaces, and the prominent Ulrike Kantor Gallery. She was featured in several notable exhibits, including "Six Downtown Sculptors" (LACE, 1979), "Downtown L.A. in Santa Barbara" (1980), "Southern California Artists" (LAICA, 1981, curated by Barbara Haskell), and "Natural Forces in Los Angeles Art" (1990).

After losing her studio space in late 1991, Sterritt lived in Ireland for six months and focused solely on drawing through 1993. She spent six months in New Mexico after receiving a Roswell Artist-in-Residence award in 1994; the two experiences significantly influenced the direction of her work. She has since had solo exhibitions at the Riverside Art Museum (2006), the galleries d.e.n. contemporary (2006) and Another Year in LA (2014), MOAH (2016), and several university venues.

== Work ==
Like her individual works, which begin with materials or found objects and develop out of intuitive choices and processes and chance, Sterritt's overall body of work has evolved organically. Writers have characterized her art as a search for harmony between opposed formal, physical and psychological properties: organic and geometric, contained and expressive, natural and human-made, stable and unstable, rugged and delicate, independent and interdependent. While her work is nonrepresentational and grounded in formal issues of line, plane, shape, space and form, she subverts that with an improvisational mingling of found, fabricated and natural materials gleaned from studio detritus, recycling bins, and construction dumpsters that smuggle in diverse references and elusive narratives and metaphors. In visual terms, critics most often note her striking compositions that seem to threaten collapse, "virtuoso acrobatic performance" evoking movement, gesture and awkward equilibrium, and eclectic tactile effects.

Coleen Sterritt, Flush, Fixall over steel & styrofoam armature, 84" x 81" x 15", 1991.

=== Early sculpture: 1978–1995 ===
Sterritt first gained notice for tripodal, hut-like structures made of industrial and natural materials, such as yucca stalk legs, upon which she balanced river rocks (e.g., Loose Shorts, 1978). Over the next decade, critics such as Joan Hugo and Peter Frank suggest her formal vocabulary and command of materials grew, her forms evolving to include stick-impaled, tar-covered pyramidal forms, and later, vessel-like biomorphic forms sprouting appendages. They described works such as Noche a Noche (1981) or O.W.W.I.H. (1984) as "ominous, yet vulnerable," "fascinating and terrifying"—alien plants or creatures, whose assertive physicality (mandible, tooth, thorn, and quill-like forms) evoked both allure and aggression. Several writers trace that ambiguity to seemingly incompatible impulses: a "strangely primal, poetic urge" to infuse her economical formal language with the energy of totemic ritual and mystery, a contemporary, punk-like angst, and an eccentric, postmodern humor.

In the later 1980s, Sterritt shifted toward work with smoother surfaces and restrained color, that some writers compare favorably to the work of Martin Puryear or Louise Bourgeois. She also undertook greater compositional challenges and expression of movement, that critic Colin Gardner wrote "synthesized classical balance with rugged, idiosyncratic kinesis," such as Full Quintet (1985), Endear (1987), or Pike: For Earl the Pearl (1988). Others recognized greater psychological tenderness and a "quasi-humorous pathos" in her ungainly, "lovable ugly ducklings," such as the swan-like Flush (1991), which features two forms in relation to explore issues of sexuality and desire, including separation and union, embrace and entrapment.

Coleen Sterritt, Diagramme de Navigation de Mon Coeur, wood, found furniture, graphite, adhesive 84" x 32" x 33", 2005.

=== Sculpture: 1995–Present ===
After a period concentrating on drawing and her time in Roswell, Sterritt returned to Los Angeles in 1995. Influenced in part by her new studio situation, she began using tentative materials—recycled studio detritus (cardboard, carpet, plastics, plywood)—and significantly, pieces of recently dismantled sculptures. Many of the new materials were relatively flat and planar; working intuitively, she engaged in basic assemblage processes: stacking, gathering, folding, arranging, slicing. Critics suggest the change in methods both expanded her use of space and imparted a new sense of temporality and fragility in the work (e.g., My Original Face, In Two Piles, Now Hanging and Red Stack (Heartbeat) (both 1995), and later, SqueezeBox, a colorful, necklace-like construction from 2002).

Sterritt began incorporating found furniture and recognizable objects in her work in the 2000s, subverting the "form follows function" dictum in witty, "towering agglomerations" that suggested plants, animals or hybrids (e.g., Daddy-O, 2006). Her process has been described as resembling a "three-dimensional journal" with each decision and part "unusually transparent," the latter category creating a split mindset in viewers between the integrated sculptures and the disparate, often recognizable, components. The juxtaposition of mass-produced and natural objects opened her work to unpredictable narratives and metaphors investigating the uneasy balance between nature and the built environment in works like One & Nine & Five & Three (2004–05) or Diagramme de Navigation de Mon Coeur (2005), which was described as a "Tatlinesque tower" whose "organic nervous geometry" seemed a meditation on male/female relationships and the flawed promises of modernist utopianism and consumerist comfort.

Coleen Sterritt, Installation view of Lancaster Museum of Art and History (MOAH) exhibition, 2016. Sculptures shown: Vixen (wood, rattan, paint, 56" x 32" x 40", 2013, right) and And Then Some (wood, bamboo, strapping tape, 99" x 61" x 40", 2012, left).

In recent years, critics have distinguished Sterritt from assemblage artists considered to have a "grunge" aesthetic (e.g., Nancy Rubin or Isa Genzken), noting her increasingly harmonious, poetic, and humorous refinement and a mastery of materials giving her sculpture "the vivacity of an intimate doodle," despite its command of space. Carole Ann Klonarides observes in later work in her 2016 MOAH exhibition, such as And Then Some (2012) and Over and Over (Flat White) (2013), "a certain precariousness, an unrepeatable act, and a unique timeless moment" she compares to the work of Brancusi.

=== Drawing ===
Throughout her career, Sterritt has considered drawing to be a significant, tangential part of her practice. Her works on paper employ a range of media, including watercolor, charcoal, oil stick, conté, pastel and collage. Like her three-dimensional work, Sterritt's drawings incorporate geometric and organic forms that she treats in a sculptural fashion to explore a similar precarious equilibrium; the work also displays a comparable awareness of materials (for example, paper as a form of wood, which she sometimes collages in bark-like strips). Critics like Peter Frank suggest the drawings differ from her sculpture in their more delicate handling of abrupt shifts in shape and texture. Sterritt's drawings have been exhibited at the Ruth Chandler Williamson Gallery (1999), Armory Center for the Arts (1995), and Washington Project for the Arts (1983), and in conjunction with sculpture.

== Teaching ==
Since 1998, Sterritt has been a professor and the faculty coordinator of the sculpture program at Long Beach City College, one of the state's largest community college art departments. She is recognized for developing a sculpture program there that has enabled community college students to transfer to top art schools across the country. From 1983 to 1999, Sterritt taught in adjunct and full-time, temporary positions at Claremont Graduate University, Otis College of Art and Design, University of Southern California, and California State University, Fullerton, where she was a Distinguished Visiting Artist. In 1990, Sterritt taught a collaborative course, "Art Majors/Dance Majors," at California State University, Long Beach with Margit Omar and postmodern choreographer Lucinda Childs.

== Awards and collections ==
Sterritt has been awarded fellowships from the John Simon Guggenheim Foundation (2016), COLA (City of Los Angeles, Sculpture, 2007), J. Paul Getty Trust Fund for the Visual Arts (1996), Art Matters, Inc. (1993) and National Endowment for the Arts (1986), as well as a Roswell Museum Artist-in-Residence Program award (1994). In 2019, she received the International Sculpture Center's "Outstanding Educator Award." Public art collections holding Sterritt's work include the Museum of Contemporary Art, Los Angeles, Los Angeles County Museum of Art, Crocker Art Museum, Anderson Museum of Contemporary Art in Roswell, and Scripps College Collection, among many.
