= Bernard Zimmerman =

American architect

- Born: April 22, 1930; Cleveland, Ohio
- Died: June 4, 2009 (aged 79); Los Angeles, California
- Education: University of California, Berkeley, University of Southern California
- Occupation: Architect
- Awards: "Stars of Design" by the Pacific Design Center; Lifetime Achievement Award from the American Institute of Architects
- Buildings: Marvin Rand residence Leland & Marian Zeidler Residence

Bernard Zimmerman (April 22, 1930 - June 4, 2009) was an influential Mid-Century modern architect and an educator at the College of Environmental Design at California State Polytechnic University, Pomona for more than thirty years.

== Early life and career ==
Zimmerman was born in Cleveland, Ohio. In 1953 he earned his bachelor's degree in architecture from the UC Berkeley School of Architecture, and in 1955 he earned his master's degree from the University of Southern California(USC). He was a Fellow of the American Institute of Architects.

Zimmerman worked for the offices of Richard Neutra Architects, Welton Beckett & Associates and Victor Gruen Associates, before becoming president of Zimmerman Architects & Planners. He helped create the Department of Architecture at the California State Polytechnic University, Pomona and helped found the Los Angeles Institute of Architecture and Design, the A+D Museum, the annual Masters in Architecture lecture series at the Los Angeles County Museum of Art and the New Blood 101 exhibit at the Pacific Design Center and Yale showcasing emerging talent in the Los Angeles area.

== Works ==
His works included many residential projects in the Los Angeles area such as the Marvin Rand residence, an apartment building in the Silver Lake neighborhood of Los Angeles, a residence in Sherman Oaks and the Lamanda Park branch of the Pasadena Public Library.

== Awards and honors ==
In 1995 Zimmerman was inducted as one of the "Stars of Design" by the Pacific Design Center, and in 1999 Zimmerman was awarded the Lifetime Achievement Award from the American Institute of Architects. Zimmerman was honored by USC's Architectural Guild in 2003 as "a Distinguished Alumnus who has enriched and honored the profession of Architecture".
