= The Brewery Art Colony =

The Brewery Arts Complex
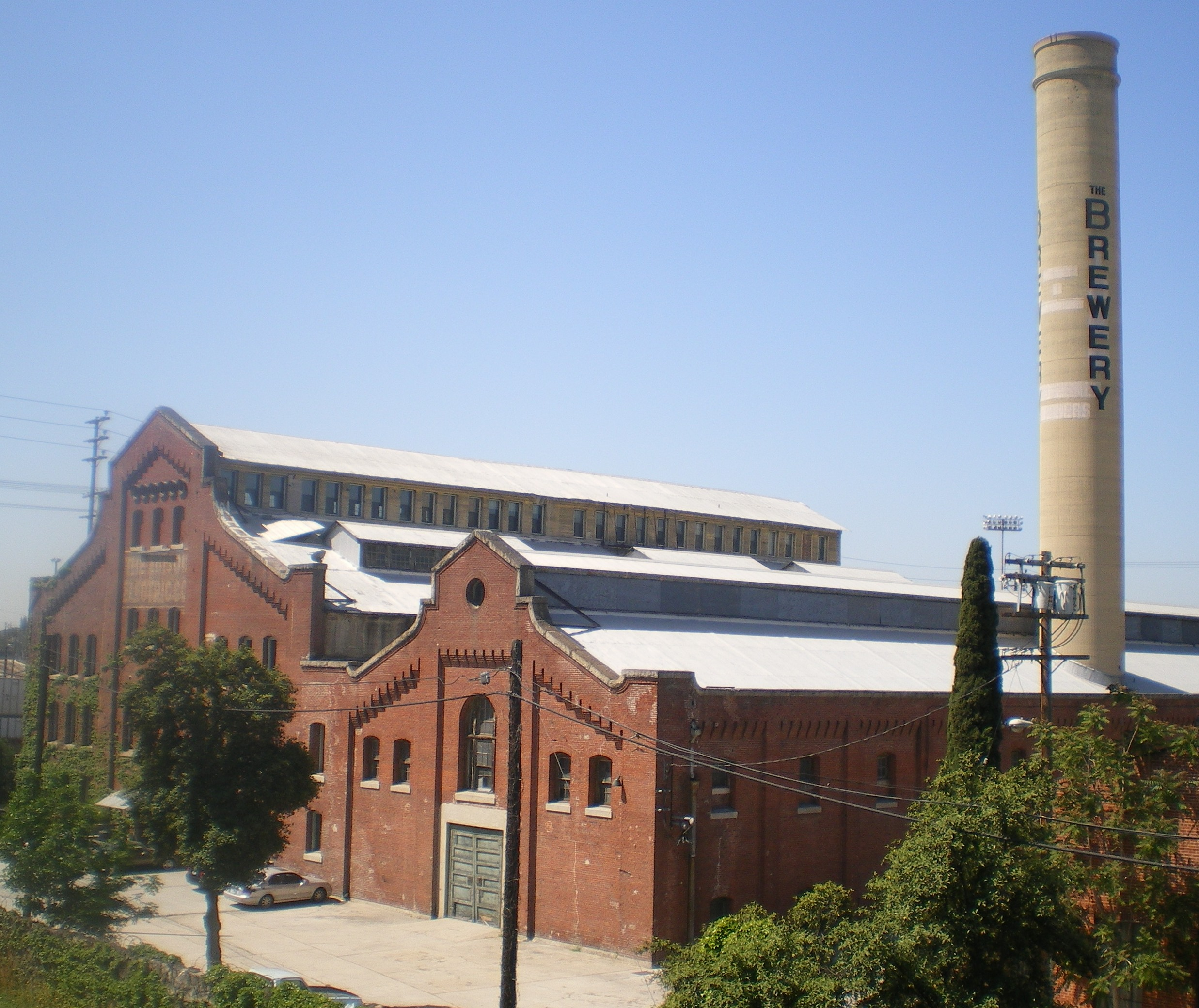
- The Brewery ArtWalk
- Interactive map of the The Brewery Arts Complex area

General information
- Type: Artist lofts
- Location: 2100 North Main Street Los Angeles, 90031; United States
- Coordinates: 34.06459°N 118.21813°W
- Construction started: 1894
- Completed: 1903
- Renovated: 1980

Design and construction
- Architect: John B. Parkinson

Website
- www.breweryartistlofts.com

The Brewery Arts Complex (also known as the Brewery Art Colony) in Los Angeles has been called the largest live-and-work artists colony in the world. The 16-acre compound sits on twenty-one former warehouses and includes a former Edison power plant chimney dating to 1903, work studios, living lofts, restaurants and galleries. The Brewery is home to practitioners of artistic media that include painting, sculpture, photography, music, industrial design, architecture and experimental new media. More than 100 of the studios are open to the public during the twice-yearly Brewery Art Walk.

== History ==
The Brewery Arts Complex began in 1903 as the Southern California Edison Electric Steam Power Plant and then as a Pabst Blue Ribbon brewery. It was converted into artist lofts beginning in 1982.

== Location ==
2100 North Main Street, east of Chinatown in the Lincoln Heights area of Los Angeles, California
