= Scott Grieger =

American artist based in Los Angeles (born 1946)

- Born: 1946 (age 79–80); Biloxi, Mississippi
- Known for: Painting
- Awards: National Endowment for the Arts Mid-Career Grant (1984)

Scott Grieger (born 1946) is an American artist based in Los Angeles. He attended Chouinard Art Institute in Los Angeles, California and received a B.F.A. from California State University, Northridge in 1971. His work has been exhibited internationally for over 40 years. He is a Professor and Program Director of Painting in the Fine Arts program at Otis College of Art and Design.

Grieger began his career during the 1970s in Los Angeles. As Suzanne Lacy writes, "There was a distinct advantage to living in Southern California’s non mainstream venues during the seventies, where an experimental art grew up outside of critical scrutiny and commercial interests." Among the artists working in Los Angeles during this period were: Paul McCarthy, Chris Burden, Martha Rosler, Allan Sekula, Alexis Smith. Grieger sees his work as challenging conventional wisdom and revealing hidden assumptions in both art and culture.

== Selected exhibitions ==
- "Scott Grieger: Unamerican Activities" at Patricia Faure Gallery, Santa Monica, California, 2000.
- "Scott Grieger: Let Freedumb Ring" at Patricia Faure Gallery, 1998.
- "LA Current: The Canvas Is Paper" at UCLA Armand Hammer Museum and Cultural Center, Los Angeles, 1998.
- "Scott Grieger: Impersonations and Combinations 1968-1973" at Margo Leavin Gallery, Los Angeles.
- "Recent Drawings" at Los Angeles Institute of Contemporary Art, 1979
- "Scott Grieger: Paintings 1974-1977" at L.A. Louver Gallery in Venice, California

== Selected articles and reviews ==
- Drohojowska Philip, Hunter."This Time, the Joke Is on Us," Los Angeles Times, Sunday Calendar, February 1, 1998.
- Frank, Peter."Art Picks of the Week," LA Weekly, February 27-March 5, 1998, p. 149.
- Rubin, David S. "It's Only Rock'n Roll," exhibition catalogue, Prestel, Munich, New York, 1995.
- "Art About Art," Museum of Modern Art, exhibition catalogue, 1979.
- Clothier, Peter. "Magic of Possible:Five Los Angeles Painters," Artforum, vol. 15, no. 8, April 1977, pp. 28–30.

== Collections ==
Grieger’s work is in the permanent collections the following museums: Museum of Modern Art, New York; Whitney Museum of American Art, New York, Los Angeles County Museum of Art; and the San Francisco Museum of Modern Art.

== Awards ==
In 2010, Grieger received a Distinguished Educator Award, Otis College and the LAX Coastal Area Chamber of Commerce. In 1984, he received a National Endowment for the Arts Mid-Career Artist Award.

== Video interviews ==
- "Out of Thin Air @LAX Artist Talk with Scott Grieger!"
- "The O-Files: Scott Grieger"
