= Stephen Kanner =

American architect (1955–2010)

Stephen H. Kanner
- Born: July 30, 1955; Chandler, Arizona, U.S.
- Died: July 2, 2010 (aged 54); Los Angeles, California
- Occupation: Architect
- Practice: Kanner Architects

Stephen H. Kanner (July 30, 1955 – July 2, 2010) was an American modern architect who co-founded the A+D Museum of Los Angeles in 2000.

Kanner was born in 1955 in Chandler, Arizona, but raised in the Mandeville Canyon neighborhood in Los Angeles. His grandfather, I. Herman Kanner, founded the family's business, Kanner Architects, in 1946. Kanner's father, Charles Kanner, an architect who served in the United States Air Force, became head of Kanner Architects in 1953 following Herman Kanner's death. Kanner received both his bachelor's degree and master's degree in architecture from a combined program at the University of California, Berkeley in 1980.

Kanner joined Kanner Architects in 1983 after the family business was commissioned to design the courthouse in East Los Angeles. The firm was headed by Kanner's father, modernist architect Charles Kanner, until his death in 1998, when Stephen Kanner became head of the company.

Kanner designed his own home in Pacific Palisades. His most recent projects included the Metro Hollywood Transit Village on Hollywood Boulevard, a lower income housing complex located at 26th Street and Santa Monica Boulevard; and the conversion of a commercial building into a luxury apartment building in Hollywood called Sunset Vine Tower.

The Los Angeles Times described Kanner as "something of an outlier among architects of his generation for the sheer volume and range of his output." Later projects were influenced by googie architecture , postmodernism and Pop art, including a 2009 United Oil station at La Brea and Slauson evoking a stack interchange and an In-N-Out restaurant in Westwood, Los Angeles, California.

Kanner died from cancer at Cedars-Sinai Medical Center on July 2, 2010, at the age of 54.

An exhibit featuring Kanner's designs was featured at the Architecture and Design Museum, Los Angeles in 2010 and 2011.
