= Santa Fe Freight Depot =

- U.S. National Register of Historic Places
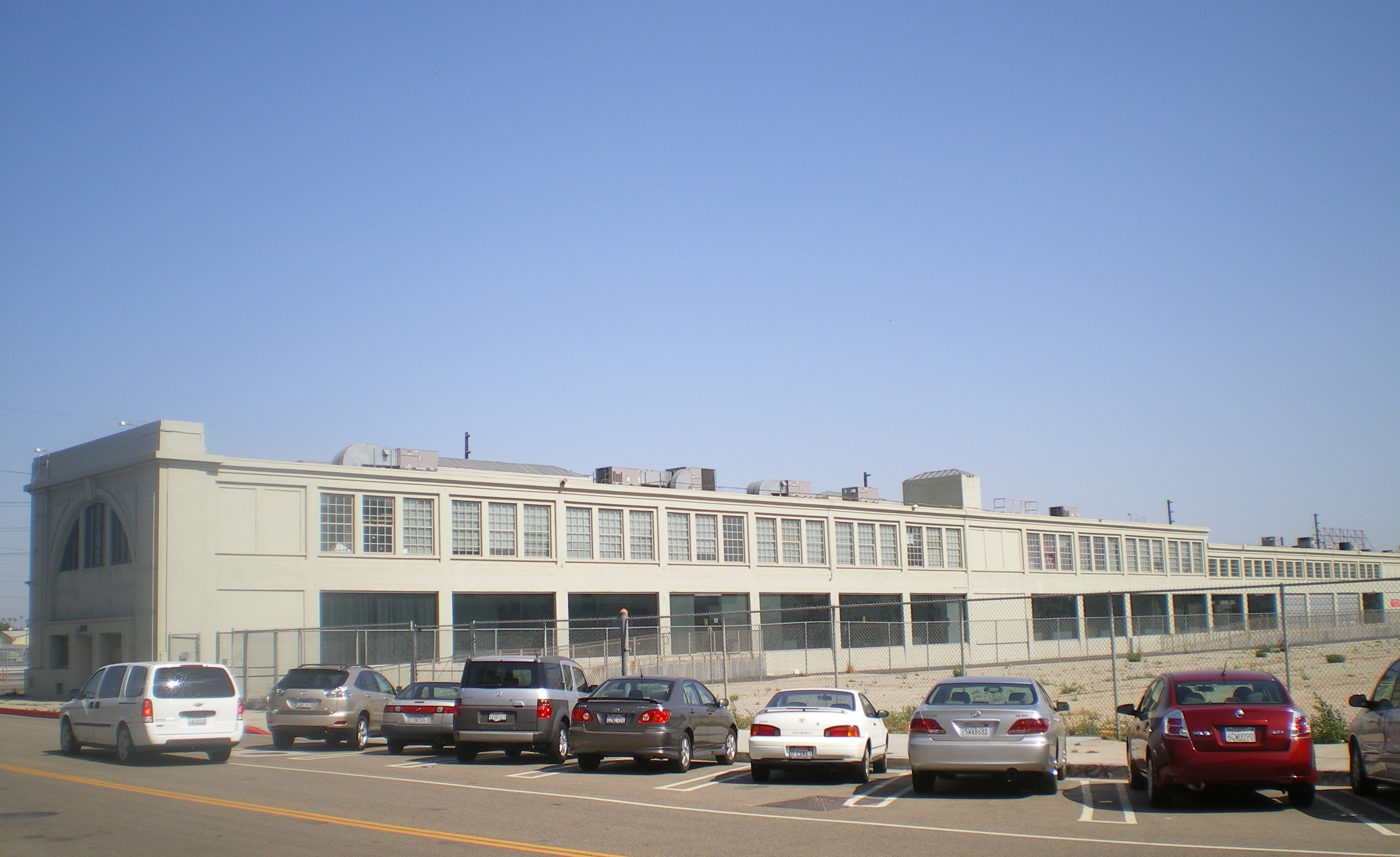
- Santa Fe Freight Depot, 2008

- Location within the Los Angeles metropolitan area Location within California Location within the United States
- Location: 970 E. 3rd St., Los Angeles, California
- Coordinates: 34°2′42″N 118°13′58″W
- Built: 1922
- Architect: Leonardt, Carl; Albright, Harrison
- Architectural style: Beaux Arts
- NRHP reference No.: 05001498
- Added to NRHP: January 3, 2006

Santa Fe Freight Depot is a quarter-mile-long building in the industrial area to the east of Downtown Los Angeles, now known as the Arts District. The Southern California Institute of Architecture converted the structure into its campus in 2000. The building's use as a school has helped revitalize a neighborhood previously considered "a gritty corner of downtown".

== Use as a freight depot ==
Built in 1907, the depot was designed by Harrison Albright, a pioneer in the use of reinforced concrete, as a railroad freight depot. The Santa Fe Coast lines secured the property along the Los Angeles River and spent approximately $300,000 building the enormous concrete building.

The depot was built to replace a freight center that had burned to the ground, and the narrow steel-reinforced concrete structure became a local landmark. For half its length, the building is only 37 feet (11 m) in width but, at 1,250 feet (380 m) in length, it is as long as the Empire State Building is tall. The building had 120 bays with opening on both sides, allowing freight cars to unload on one side while trucks were loaded on the other side.

== Conversion to SCI-Arc's campus ==
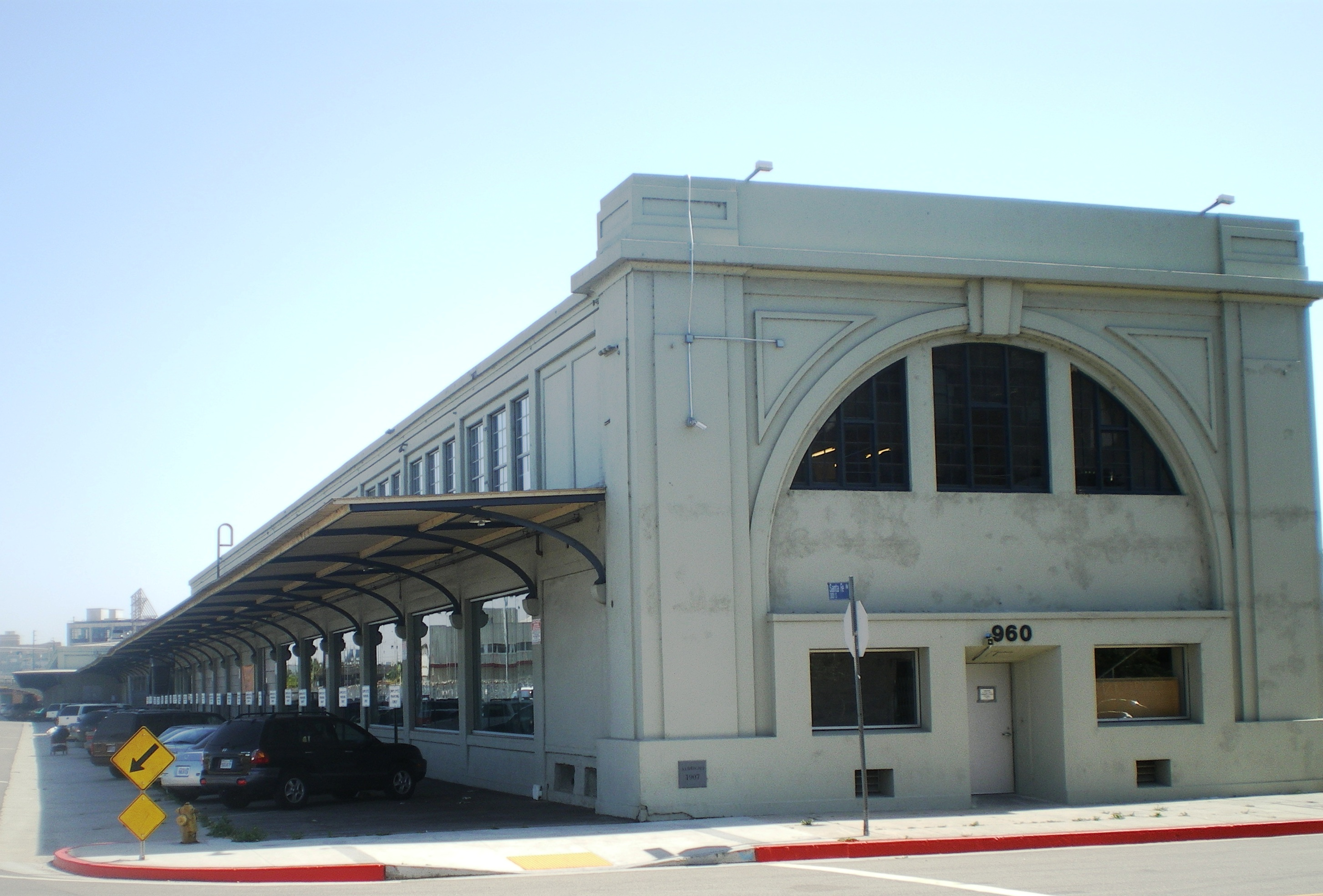
View from north

By the 1990s, the depot was a vacant building covered in graffiti. The building had been stripped to the concrete, with a single room as long as four football fields. Then, in 2000, the Southern California Institute of Architecture, or SCI-Arc, obtained a lease on the property with plans to relocate its campus to the location. Over the next two years, SCI-Arc renovated and converted the building, considered an "industrial leftover," into a 61,000-square-foot (5,700 m^{2}) state-of-the-art architecture school.

The renovation was designed by SCI-Arc graduate and faculty member Gary Paige who described the building as a "found object -- one with ceilings up to 20 feet (6.1 m) high and broad views of the downtown skyline." Paige also added: "We like the unrelenting and extreme nature of the building." One reviewer noted that the structure was a mixed blessing: "Time had been generous to it, giving the interior surfaces a seasoned patina akin to character lines on a wise face. The problem was typology: Being as long as the Empire State Building is tall, the shotgun building was unremittingly linear, with only one jog breaking the monotony of its quarter-mile length." Another review called wrote:

The recombinant building is a lesson in engineering and architecture. Thirty thousand square feet of studios and seminar spaces, a workshop, a thesis pit and a bridge to the library have been stacked, cantilevered and suspended to form an open-ended, permissive, flexible space. It seems that anything can happen within these walls. Enter a studio through its doorway (which has no door), and you are standing on what is more like a stage, looking out through a proscenium framed by new steel posts and girders set parallel to and in tandem with the old concrete columns and beams.

Prior to the opening of the SCI-Arc campus, the neighborhood around the depot was referred to as a "gritty corner of downtown." Since 2000, SCI-Arc's presence has helped revitalize the neighborhood. However, the area's revitalization has driven up the property's value and resulted in an expensive legal battle that ended with a determination in June 2005 that SCI-Arc did not have the right to purchase the depot building and land in which its campus is located. A developer also purchased the vacant land to the west of Sci-Arc, announcing plans in 2004 to construct a pair of 40-story towers, each with 384 luxury apartments.

Pritzker Prize-winner and SCI-Arc co-founder Thom Mayne wrote an editorial in 2005 urging the city to step in to make sure that SCI-Arc was encouraged and preserved as an important urban catalyst for Downtown Los Angeles. Mayne noted that SCI-Arc had taken root in the neighborhood bringing hundreds of young people into the once-abandoned area, and noted that SCI-Arc's move to the former freight depot was "the prototype of an institution that resonates with energy and creativity." SCI-Arc succeeded in a second attempt to purchase the building in 2011, paying $23.1 million.

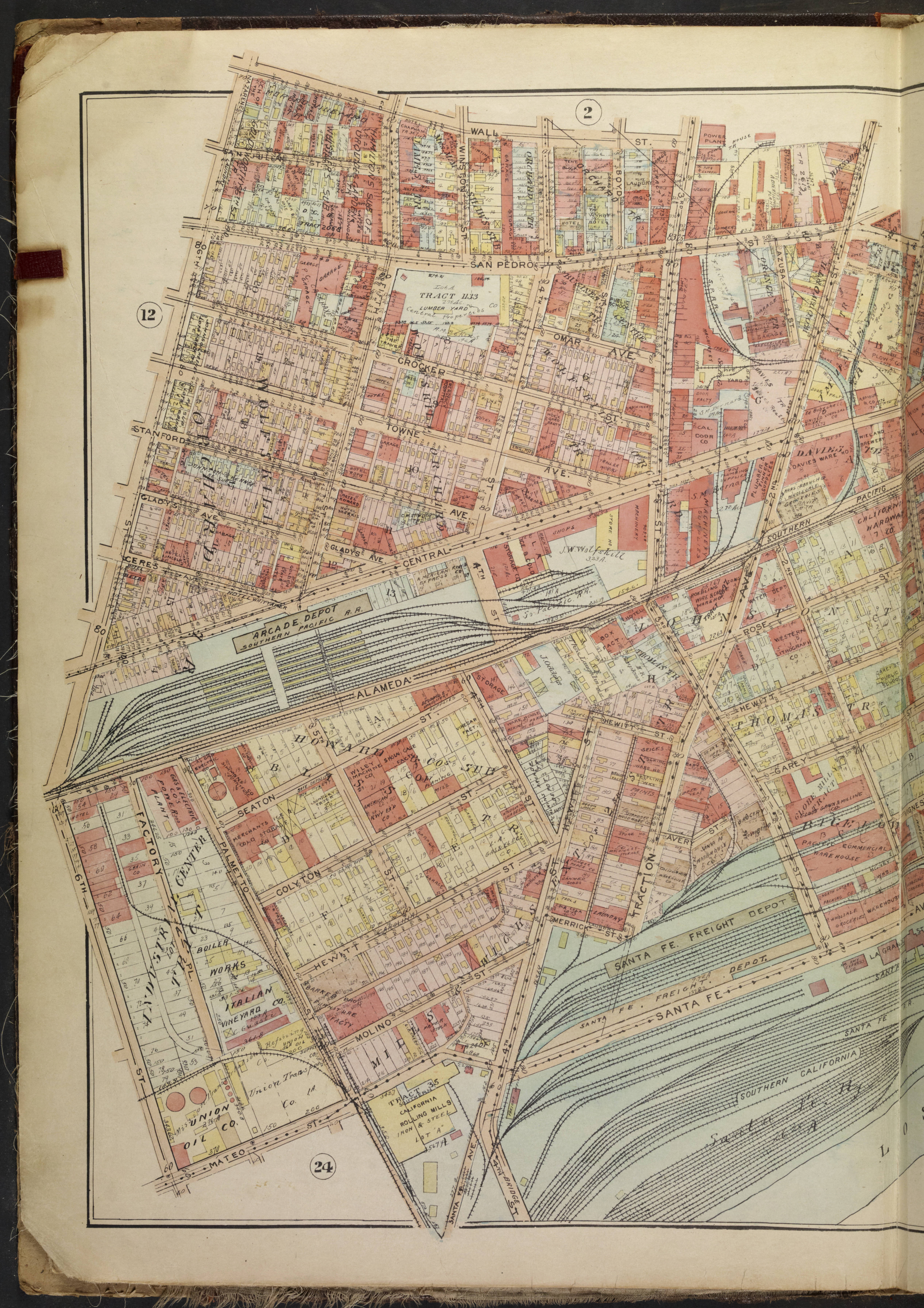
Santa Fe Freight Depot, 1921

== Historic designation ==
The building was added to the National Register of Historic Places in 2006.

== See also ==
- List of Registered Historic Places in Los Angeles
- Southern California Institute of Architecture
