= List of Turner Prize winners and nominees =

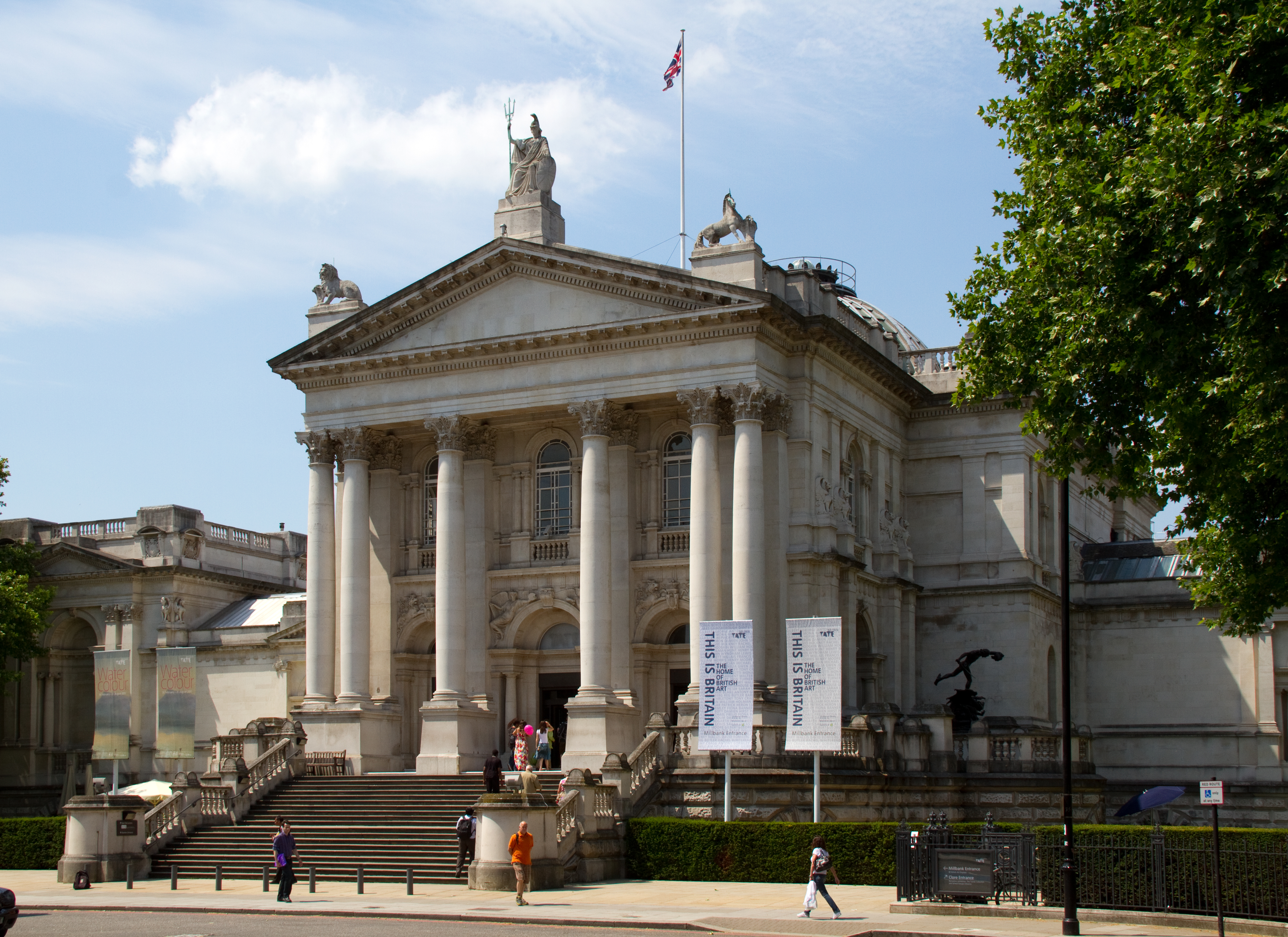
Tate Britain: the venue for the Turner Prize except in 2007, 2011, 2013, 2015 and 2017

The Turner Prize is an annual prize presented to a British visual artist, organised by the Tate Gallery. Named after the painter J. M. W. Turner, it was first presented in 1984, and is one of the United Kingdom's most prestigious, but controversial, art awards. Initially, the prize was awarded to the individual who had "made the greatest contribution to art in Britain in the previous twelve months", but it now celebrates "a British artist under fifty for an outstanding exhibition or other presentation of their work in the twelve months preceding". The winner is chosen by a panel of four independent judges invited by the Tate and chaired by the director of Tate Britain. The prize is accompanied by a monetary award of £25,000, although the amount has varied depending on the sponsor. For example, between 2004 and 2007, while sponsored by Gordon's, the total prize fund was £40,000; £25,000 was awarded to the winner and £5,000 to the losing nominees.

A shortlist of finalists is drawn up and usually published about six months before the prize is awarded in November or December each year, although shortlists were not made public in 1988 and 1990; in 1989, a list of seven "commended" artists was published. Controversy surrounded the presentation of the inaugural prize to Malcolm Morley as some critics "questioned his relevance" to art in Britain; he had lived and worked in the United States for the previous 20 years. Since its inception, the prize itself has received considerable criticism. In 2002, after Culture Minister Kim Howells described the Turner Prize as "conceptual bullshit", Prince Charles wrote a letter of support to him, stating "It has contaminated the art establishment for so long". Since 2000, the Stuckists art group have protested against the prize; in 2008, they gave out leaflets with the message "The Turner Prize is Crap", to protest at the lack of figurative paintings amongst the nominees' exhibitions.

Considerable media pressure is applied to nominees and winners of the Turner Prize. The 2003 winner Grayson Perry stated that "Such media storms can be traumatising for someone who has laboured away for years in a studio, making art not news." Some artists, including Sarah Lucas and Julian Opie, have decided not to participate in the event, regarding a nomination as "a poisoned chalice". Stephen Deuchar, Director of Tate Britain suggested "We want the artists to be comfortable with media pressure. We have to shield them".

Several winners of the prize have won other notable awards such as the Venice Biennale, and continue to present their works at various international exhibitions. Winners' reactions to the award range from Damien Hirst's "A media circus to raise money for the Tate and Channel 4" to Jeremy Deller's "It blew me away, people's hunger to see what I'd done". Auction prices for works by previous winners have generally increased. The award has also seen some unexpected results: Tracey Emin's My Bed, was overlooked in 1999 despite drawing large crowds to the Tate. The Chapman brothers and Willie Doherty lost out to Grayson Perry in 2003 – Perry accepted the award dressed as a girl while Jake Chapman described "losing the Turner prize to a grown man dressed as a small girl" as his "most embarrassing moment".

== Winners and shortlisted artists ==
Year	Winner	Format	Nominees	Notes
1984	Malcolm Morley	Painting	Richard Deacon; Gilbert and George; Howard Hodgkin; Richard Long	Inaugural prize winner, awarded £10,000
1985	Howard Hodgkin	Painting, printing	Terry Atkinson; Tony Cragg; Ian Hamilton Finlay; Milena Kalinovska; John Walker	—
1986	Gilbert and George	Photomontage	Art & Language; Victor Burgin; Derek Jarman; Stephen McKenna; Bill Woodrow	Nicholas Serota (pictured), Matthew Collings and Robin Klassnik were all commended. Gilbert and George were nominees in 1984.
1987	Richard Deacon	Sculpture	Patrick Caulfield; Helen Chadwick; Richard Long; Declan McGonagle; Thérèse Oulton	Richard Long was also a nominee in 1984.
1988	Tony Cragg	Sculpture	Lucian Freud; Richard Hamilton; Richard Long; David Mach; Boyd Webb; Alison Wilding; Richard Wilson	Richard Long was also a nominee in 1984 and 1987.
1989	Richard Long	Sculpture	Gillian Ayres; Lucian Freud; Giuseppe Penone; Paula Rego; Sean Scully; Richard Wilson	There was no shortlist, but the losing nominees were "commended". Lucian Freud and Richard Wilson were nominees in 1988.
1990	—	—	—	Prize suspended due to lack of sponsor following the bankruptcy of Drexel Burnham Lambert
1991	Anish Kapoor	Sculpture	Ian Davenport; Fiona Rae; Rachel Whiteread	Prize was increased to £20,000 with sponsorship from Channel 4
1992	Grenville Davey	Sculpture	Damien Hirst; David Tremlett; Alison Wilding	—
1993	Rachel Whiteread	Sculpture	Hannah Collins; Vong Phaophanit; Sean Scully	First female winner; also won the £40,000 K Foundation art award presented to the "worst artist of the year"
1994	Antony Gormley	Sculpture	Willie Doherty; Peter Doig; Shirazeh Houshiary	—
1995	Damien Hirst	Installation, painting	Mona Hatoum; Callum Innes; Mark Wallinger	Damien Hirst: his exhibit included a bisected cow and calf in formaldehyde in a vitrine – Mother and Child Divided. He was a nominee in 1992.
1996	Douglas Gordon	Video	Craigie Horsfield; Gary Hume; Simon Patterson	Douglas Gordon was the first winner to be based outside of London and also the first artist to win the prize with a moving image work.
1997	Gillian Wearing	Video	Christine Borland; Angela Bulloch; Cornelia Parker	The first all-female shortlist
1998	Chris Ofili	Multi-layered painting	Tacita Dean; Cathy de Monchaux; Sam Taylor-Wood	—
1999	Steve McQueen	Video	Tracey Emin; Steven Pippin; Jane and Louise Wilson	Tracey Emin exhibited her bed, titled My Bed
2000	Wolfgang Tillmans	Photography	Glenn Brown; Michael Raedecker; Tomoko Takahashi	Wolfgang Tillmans is German, but is based in London.
2001	Martin Creed	Installation	Richard Billingham; Isaac Julien; Mike Nelson	The prize was presented by Madonna.
2002	Keith Tyson	Installation, painting	Fiona Banner; Liam Gillick; Catherine Yass	The prize was presented by architect Daniel Libeskind.
2003	Grayson Perry	Pottery	Jake and Dinos Chapman; Willie Doherty; Anya Gallaccio	Grayson Perry, a cross-dresser, accepted the prize wearing a dress. The prize was presented by Sir Peter Blake.
2004	Jeremy Deller	Video, installation	Kutluğ Ataman; Langlands and Bell; Yinka Shonibare	Prize increased to £25,000; losing nominees awarded £5,000 each. The prize was presented by journalist Jon Snow.
2005	Simon Starling	Installation	Darren Almond; Gillian Carnegie; Jim Lambie	The prize was presented by then Culture Minister David Lammy.
2006	Tomma Abts	Painting	Phil Collins; Mark Titchner; Rebecca Warren	Tomma Abts is German, but works in the UK. The prize was presented by Yoko Ono.
2007	Mark Wallinger	Installation	Nathan Coley; Zarina Bhimji; Mike Nelson	Mark Wallinger (a nominee in 1995) won for State Britain. The award show and ceremony were held in Tate Liverpool, and the prize was sponsored by Milligan. The prize was presented by Dennis Hopper.
2008	Mark Leckey	Sculpture, film, sound, performance	Runa Islam; Goshka Macuga; Cathy Wilkes	No prize sponsor: funded by the Tate.
2009	Richard Wright	Site-specific painting	Enrico David; Roger Hiorns; Lucy Skaer	—
2010	Susan Philipsz	Sound installation	Dexter Dalwood; Angela de la Cruz; The Otolith Group (Anjalika Sagar and Kodwo Eshun)	Susan Philipsz is the first sound artist to be nominated and the first to win.
2011	Martin Boyce	Installation	Karla Black; Hilary Lloyd; George Shaw	Exhibition at the Baltic Gallery in Gateshead from 21 October 2011 to 8 January 2012
2012	Elizabeth Price	Video	Spartacus Chetwynd; Luke Fowler; Paul Noble	—
2013	Laure Prouvost	Installation, collage, film	Lynette Yiadom-Boakye; David Shrigley; Tino Sehgal	—
2014	Duncan Campbell	Video	Ciara Phillips; James Richards; Tris Vonna-Michell	—
2015	Assemble	Architecture and design	Bonnie Camplin; Janice Kerbel; Nicole Wermers	—
2016	Helen Marten	Installation	Michael Dean; Anthea Hamilton; Josephine Pryde	—
2017	Lubaina Himid	Painting	Lubaina Himid; Rosalind Nashashibi; Hurvin Anderson; Andrea Büttner	The jury featured Dan Fox, Co-Editor at Frieze; Martin Herbert, art critic; Mason Leaver-Yap, Walker Art Center's Bentson Scholar of Moving Image in Minneapolis, and associate Curator at Kunst-Werke Institute for Contemporary Art in Berlin; and Emily Pethick, Director, The Showroom, London.
2018	Charlotte Prodger	Video	Forensic Architecture; Naeem Mohaiemen; Luke Willis Thompson	The 2018 jury comprises Oliver Basciano, art critic and International Editor at ArtReview; Elena Filipovic, Director, Kunsthalle Basel; Lisa Le Feuvre, Executive Director, Holt-Smithson Foundation; and Tom McCarthy, novelist and writer.
2019	Lawrence Abu Hamdan; Helen Cammock; Tai Shani; Oscar Murillo	Film, spoken word performance, and painting	Lawrence Abu Hamdan; Helen Cammock; Tai Shani; Oscar Murillo.	The prize was to be sponsored by Stagecoach South East but this was quickly dropped after criticism from the LGBT community. The prize was shared by all nominees after they wrote a letter asking the judges not to choose a single winner. The jury featured Alessio Antoniolli, Director, Gasworks & Triangle Network; Elvira Dyangani Ose, Director of The Showroom Gallery and Lecturer in Visual Cultures at Goldsmiths; Victoria Pomery, Director, Turner Contemporary, Margate and Charlie Porter, writer.
2020	Cancelled		Bursaries: Oreet Ashery; Liz Johnson Artur; Shawanda Corbett; Jamie Crewe; Sean Edwards; Sidsel Meineche Hansen; Ima-Abasi Okon; Imran Perretta; Alberta Whittle; Arika	The 2020 prize was cancelled due to the COVID-19 pandemic in the United Kingdom. Instead a £10,000 bursary was given to ten artists.
2021	Array Collective	Installation and theatre	B.O.S.S; Cooking Sections; Gentle/Radical; Project Art Works	
2022	Veronica Ryan	Sculpture	Heather Phillipson; Ingrid Pollard; Sin Wai Kin	
2023	Jesse Darling	Sculpture	Ghislaine Leung; Rory Pilgrim; Barbara Walker	The 2023 prize winner was announced on 5 December at Towner Eastbourne.
2024	Jasleen Kaur	Installation and sculpture	Pio Abad; Claudette Johnson; Jasleen Kaur; Delaine Le Bas	Jury is Rosie Cooper, Ekow Eshun, Sam Thorne, Lydia Yee
2025	Nnena Kalu	Sculpture and drawing	Nnena Kalu; Rene Matić; Mohamed Sami; Zadie Xa	Jury is Andrew Bonacina, Sam Lackey, Priyesh Mistry, Habda Rashid
