= 2009 Turner Prize =

British prize for contemporary art

The four nominees for the Tate gallery's 2009 Turner Prize were Enrico David, Roger Hiorns, Lucy Skaer and Richard Wright . The award went to Richard Wright on 7 December 2009 winning him the £25,000 prize ($41,000, 28,000 EUR). The Turner jury said in a statement that they "admired the profound originality and beauty of Wright's work." The other shortlisted nominees each won £5,000.

The chairman of the jury was Tate Britain director, Stephen Deuchar. The judges were Jonathan Jones (art critic for The Guardian), Charles Esche (director of the Van Abbemuseum in Eindhoven, Doctor Andrea Schlieker (Curator Folkestone Triennial) and Mariella Frostrup (broadcaster).

== Exhibition ==
An exhibition of work by the nominees was shown at Tate Britain from 6 October 2009 to 3 January 2010.

The Turner Prize is awarded for a show by the artist in the previous year. When nominees are told of their nomination they then prepare exhibits for the Turner Prize exhibition, often at short notice. As such, the Turner Prize exhibition may not feature the works for which the artist was initially nominated by the judges. However the Turner Prize exhibition tends to be the basis on which public and press judge the artist's worthiness for nomination.

== Nominees ==
There were four nominees for the prize (chosen from a long-list of 19 artists), announced on Tuesday 28 April 2009:

- Enrico David, nominated for his solo exhibition Dzzzzt By Mammy? at the Museum fur Gegenwartskunst, Basel and Bulbous Marauder at the Seattle Arts Museum.
- Roger Hiorns, nominated for his 2008 exhibition Seizure; an abandoned flat left to bathe in liquid copper sulphate until all surfaces were covered in blue crystals.
  - An alumnus of Goldsmiths College, London.
- Lucy Skaer, nominated for her solo exhibition at the Fruitmarket Gallery, Edinburgh and A Boat Used as a Vessel at the Kunsthalle, Basel.
  - Born Cambridge, 1975. Lives and works in London and Glasgow.
- Richard Wright, nominated for work exhibited at the 55th Carnegie International, Pittsburgh and his exhibition at the Ingleby Gallery, Edinburgh.
  - Glasgow-based, born 1960.

== Works and press coverage ==
=== Enrico David ===
  - Absuction Cardigan or How Do You Love Dzzzzt By Mammy?
    - A papier mache egg shaped man on rocking chair legs with a photo of the artist's face stuck on., (External image)
  - Bulbous Marauder
    - An image of two harlequins wielding clubs. (External image)
  - Bulbous Marauder 2
    - A face looks down as seen between the parted legs of someone in harlequin costume. (External image)
  - Wayne Shire
    - A stuffed dummy, collapsed on the ground. (External image).
  - ?
    - "A glimpse at a gay man's bottom".
  - ?
    - "the face of Kenneth Williams thrown into a boot".

The artist says:

- "I see the potential of the creative process as a representation of a new language to be simultaneously constructed and discovered, on the basis of pre-existing aesthetic and cultural templates."

The critics said:

- "[his work] has never touched, moved or done more than mildly irritate me." - Adrian Searle, The Guardian
- "a brilliant painter, strange and disturbing, definitely not safe or conventional, one of the most exciting, troubling artists of our time." - Jonathan Jones, The Guardian
- "his work is a bit silly. It’s a sort of punch-and-judy psychodrama, a romp in a perverse shop window." - Tom Lubbock - The Independent
- "the only one of this year's contestants whose work brought back that toe-tapping annoyance of a decade ago." - Charles Darwent, The Independent
- "a pantomime of impotent half-jokes." - Laura Cumming, The Observer.

=== Roger Hiorns ===
  - Seizure
    - A flat was filled with copper sulphate which, once it had evaporated, left all surfaces covered in blue crystal.(External image) (External image).
  - ?
    - Cubes of processed cows' brains in metal racks.
  - ?
    - a scattered pile of dust made from disintegrating a jet engine.(External image).
  - IBM (15 x 10)
    - a white tubular shape with a black contraption at one end. (External image).
  - Discipline
    - Steel thistles covered in copper sulphate crystals leaning against a wall.(External image)
  - Vauxhall
    - Flames coming from a floor drain.(External image)

The artist says:

- "I prefer to distance myself from ideas of posterity, of the longevity of a piece of art. None of that seems healthy. I don't like explaining and being explicit."

The critics said:

- "Hiorns's art has nowhere much to go. It has already crystallised. I like Hiorns, but have always found him extremely repetitive." - Adrian Searle, The Guardian
- "does surprising things with surprising materials [...] [the powdered jet engine] is beautiful and spectacular."
- "His main entry in the Turner show, an untitled floor piece, pulls off another material miracle. Made in part of powdered cow brains, the work is both immensely clever and an island of the Romantic imagination – brainy in every way possible." - Charles Darwent, The Independent.

=== Lucy Skaer ===
  - ?
    - "a pointed stone loop in front of some kind of book and a fairly ordinary wooden chair". (External image)
  - ?
    - "two paintings that seem to have been created by pressing them between paper". (External image)
  - ?
    - a curved sheet of paper half-covered in black ink spirals to give the appearance of a whale skeleton hidden behind a false wall in the corner.
  - Black Alphabet
    - "26 copies of Brâncuși's sculpture Bird in Space made from impacted coal dust". (External image), (External image).
  - Leviathan Edge
    - A sperm whale skull partially hidden behind screens. (External image 1, External image 2).
  - The Siege[?]
    - Large images of hands, one on the floor the other on a table. (External image)
  - The Siege[?]
    - A three panel image of a black mass. (image)
  - Solid Ground - Liquid to Solid in 85 years
    - An arrangement of objects on the ground. (External image).
  - ?
    - An image produced by inking a chair and pressing it to paper.

The artist says:

- "I'm interested in a state of between-ness, and that state you find if one thing transforms to another."

The critics said:

- "her work can be delicate, moving and strange, but everything she does needs an awful lot of mental unpacking." - Adrian Searle, The Guardian
- "her contribution may feel decidedly bitty, but as you puzzle and ponder and try to put it together you find yourself focusing on the act of looking itself." - Rachel Campbell-Johnston - The Times
- "what’s it about? Do I care enough to do the homework? There’s always some background thinking, tenuously connected to a curious exhibit [...] I feel sure she’s got an interesting mind. I’m not sure it’s the mind of an artist." - Tom Lubbock, The Independent
- "Skaer was one of the highlights of this art year for me, as she is of the 2009 Turner Prize show." - Charles Darwent, The Independent.
- "Much of what she makes is about slowing the eye and thus the mind. And almost everything here holds you with an enigmatic clarity and impact I haven't seen in her work before. But against this is her speeding brain, polymorphous, doodling around, sometimes overshooting the mark." - Laura Cumming, The Observer.

=== Richard Wright ===
  - Untitled
    - A gold leaf fresco that was painted over once the exhibition finished. (External image), (External image)
  - No Title
    - A painting as if looking through an arched window towards other arched windows.(External image)
  - Not Titled
    - A painting of a red geometric shape, tapering towards the floor. (External image)
  - No Title
    - Shelving, as if set in a door frame. (External image).
  - Untitled
    - A bean-shaped design pattern. (External image).

The critics said:

- "ephemeral but often rather beautiful [...] sometimes, getting up close, you can drown in their fixated patterning." Searle, The Guardian
- "Wright's painting speaks of the exaltation of the human spirit, of our finer instincts and loftier ambitions, of the ability of the soul to soar and sing. It heralds nothing less than the return of beauty to modern art."
- "feels institutional rather than sweetly and typically subversive."

== Critics' reception of exhibition as a whole ==
- "seductive, intriguing, involving work that appeals to the emotions and the senses" - Charlotte Higgins - The Guardian
- "if you enjoy huffing and puffing about the deplorable state of contemporary art, this year’s Turner Prize will probably prove disappointing [...] This is a subtle show which marks an optimistic upturn for the Turner." - Rachel Campbell-Johnston, The Times
- "you might find hard to tell where one part of the exhibition stopped and the next started. There’s plenty of common ground." - Tom Lubbock, The Independent
- "compared with last year's dismal and bloodless show, 2009 aims considerably higher." - Laura Cumming, The Observer.
