= Nicole Wermers =

German artist (born 1971)

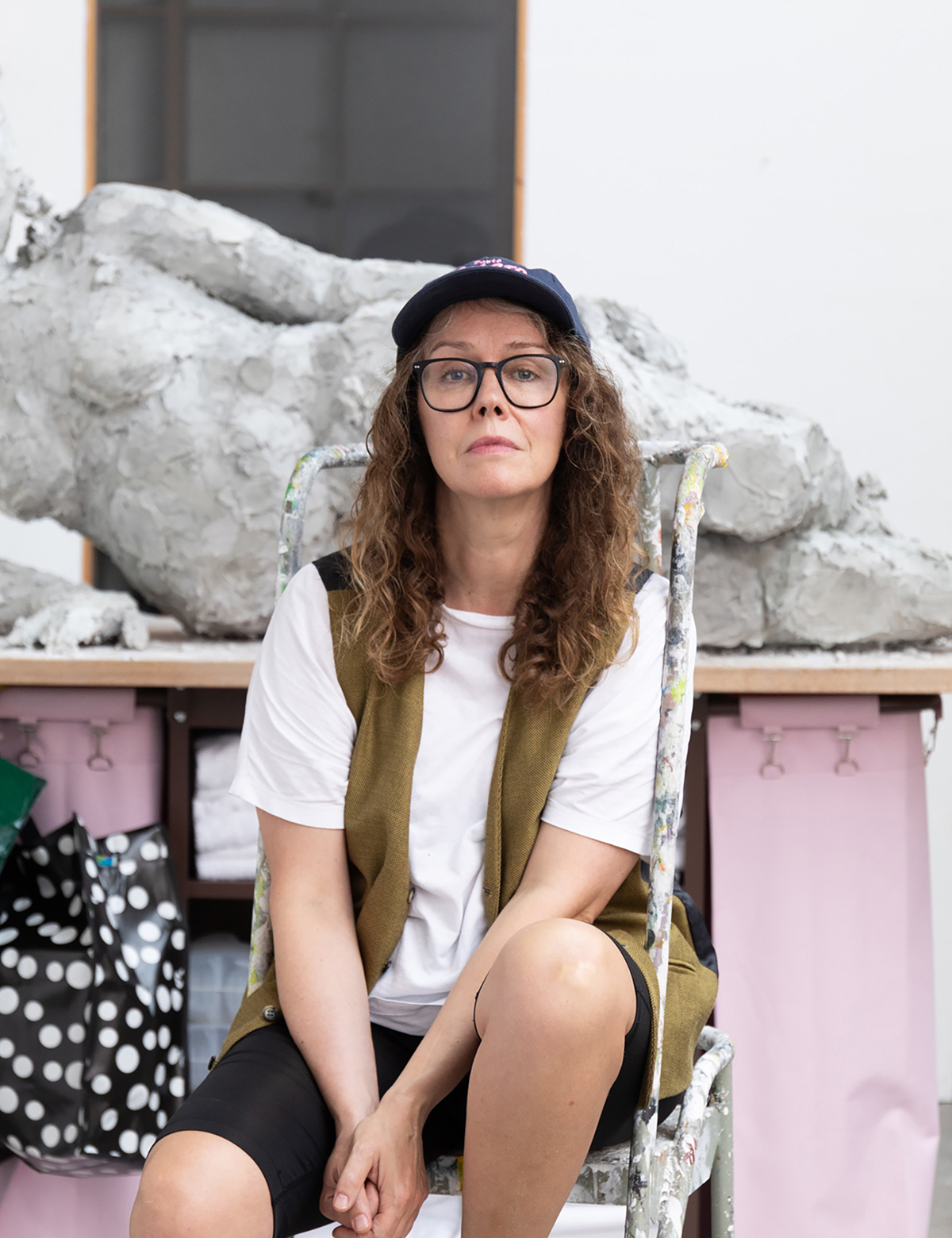
Nicole Wermers (2024)

Nicole Wermers (born 1971) is a German artist, born in Emsdetten, and based in London.

== Education ==
Wermers studied at the Academy of Fine Arts of Hamburg (Hochschule für bildende Künste Hamburg) from 1991 to 1997 and received an MFA from Central Saint Martins College of Art and Design, University of the Arts London in 1999. She has participated in residencies at Delfina Studio Trust in London (2004) and Camden Arts Centre in London (2005), and most recently received a fellowship at Villa Massimo, the German Academy in Rome (2012).

== Career ==
In 2013, Wermers designed a double-ended teaspoon for use in the newly-renovated cafe at the Tate Britain. Many of the specially made teaspoons were reportedly stolen by diners and visitors. Wermers was reported as saying that she liked "the idea that the only way you can possess one of them, is to steal it".

In 2015 Wermers was nominated for the Turner Prize in recognition of her exhibition Infrastruktur, originally shown at Herald St, London. Her installation Infrastruktur adopted the glossy aesthetics and materials of modernist design and high fashion, alluding to themes of lifestyle, class, consumption and control. She became a professor at the Academy of Fine Arts, Munich in 2017.

A set of works by Wermers involving figurative sculptures in clay was exhibited in Glasgow in 2024. A further clay relief, depicting couples engaged in marathon dancing, was exhibited in Waterford, Ireland, in early 2025..

== Collections ==
The artist's works can be found in the permanent collections of Tate in London, Hamburger Kunsthalle in Hamburg, Museum für Moderne Kunst in Frankfurt, Karl-Ernst Osthaus Museum in Hagen, and as part of the DGZ Bank Collection in Düsseldorf, among others.

== Awards ==
In 1998-99 Wermers received the DAAD Jahresstipendium, London, 1997 Award of the Dietze Foundation, Hamburg.

In 2015 Wermers was nominated for the Turner Prize along with Bonnie Camplin, Janice Kerbel, and Assemble.
