= 2010 Turner Prize =

British prize for contemporary art

The four nominees for the Tate Gallery's 2010 Turner Prize were Dexter Dalwood, Angela de la Cruz, Susan Philipsz and The Otolith Group (Anjalika Sagar and Kodwo Eshun)

The winner was Susan Philipsz - the first sound artist to be nominated and the first to win. Her winning work was an installation under three bridges in Glasgow in which she sang the sea shanty "Lowlands Away".
