= The Common Guild =

Scottish visual arts organisation

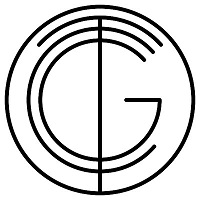
- Established: 2006
- Location: 5 Florence Street, Glasgow G5 0YX
- Director: Katrina Brown
- Curator: Chloe Reith
- Website: www.thecommonguild.org.uk

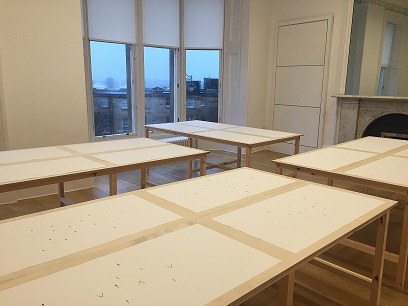
Exhibition space at The Common Guild during Janice Kerbel's 'Notes from Sink' (2018), the last exhibition held at 21 Woodlands Terrace.

The Common Guild is a visual arts organisation in Glasgow, Scotland. It was established in 2006 and has commissioned two Turner Prize-nominated works: Duncan Campbell in 2014 and Janice Kerbel in 2015.

The Common Guild is located in a former school building on the south bank of the River Clyde in Glasgow. The building houses The Common Guild's offices, a library with over 1,000 contemporary art books and public event and exhibition spaces. Exhibitions hosted by The Common Guild have included solo shows by Martin Creed, Steven Claydon, Roni Horn, Tacita Dean, Wolfgang Tillmans and Roman Ondák; and numerous group shows.

Beyond their own gallery space, The Common Guild organise and curate exhibitions and art events such as 'the Persistence of Objects' at Lismore Castle Arts in 2015 and 'Scotland + Venice 2013' at the 55th Venice Biennale.

Between 2008 and 2013, The Common Guild worked with Gallery of Modern Art, Glasgow (GoMA) and Art Fund to build a new collection of international contemporary work for Glasgow including works by Emily Jacir, Matthew Buckingham and Lothar Baumgarten among others, many of which are regularly on display at GoMA.

Previous premises at 21 Woodlands Terrace provided a key location for the filming of Glasgow: The Grit and the Glamour, a film in the BBC's Imagine series.

== Solo shows ==
- Adel Abdessemed, 'TRUST ME', 2008
- Spencer Finch, 2008
- Roni Horn, 'the tiniest piece of mirror is always the whole mirror', 2009
- Mircea Cantor, 'Which light kills you’, 2010
- Martin Creed, 'Things', 2010
- Gerard Byrne, 'Images or shadows of divine things', 2010
- Robert Barry, 'Words and Music', 2010
- Tacita Dean, 2011
- Ulla von Brandenburg, 'Neue Alte Welt', 2011
- Thea Djordjadze, 'Lost Promise in a Room', 2011
- Wolfgang Tillmans, 'A New Installation, with Works from the Arts Council Collection', 2012
- Ugo Rondinone, 'primitive', 2012
- Carol Bove, 'The Foamy Saliva of a Horse', 2013
- Roman Ondák, 'Some Thing', 2013
- Gabriel Kuri, 'All probability resolves into form', 2014
- Hayley Tompkins, 'Scotland + Venice', 2014
- Corin Sworn, 'Scotland + Venice', 2014
- Duncan Campbell, 'Scotland + Venice', 2014
- Anne Hardy, 'TWIN FIELDS', 2015
- Thomas Demand, 'Daily Show', 2015
- Akram Zaatari, 'The End of Time', 2016
- Simon Starling, ‘At Twilight’, 2016
- Sharon Hayes, 'In My Little Corner of the World, Anyone Would Love You', 2016
- Steven Claydon, ‘The Archipelago of Contented Peoples: Endurance Groups’, 2017
- Katinka Bock, 'Radio Piombino', 2018
- Janice Kerbel, 'Notes from Sink / Routine for 24 Women', 2018
- Basel Abbas & Ruanne Abou-Rahme 'May Amnesia Never Kiss Us on the Mouth', 2022
- Corin Sworn 'In Reflection, SHimmer', 2023
- Nicole Wermers, 'Day Care', 2024
- Tarik Kiswanson, 'The Rupture', 2024

== Group Shows ==
- 'Always Begins By Degrees', Adel Abdessemed, Roni Horn, Anna Gaskell, Pavel Büchler, Marine Hugonnier, Marcel Broodthaers, Philippe Parreno, Cerith Wyn Evans, 2008
- “You seem the same as always, -”, Claire Barclay, Kate Davis, Olafur Eliasson, Hans-Peter Feldmann, Douglas Gordon, Gabriel Orozco, Yvonne Rainer, Richard Serra and David Shrigley, 2011
- 'HOW TO LOOK AT EVERYTHING', Zbynek Baladrán, Simon Martin, Nick Relph & Falke Pisano, 2012
- 'Slow Objects', Vanessa Billy, Edith Dekyndt and Erin Shirreff, 2017

== Off-site Exhibitions ==
- Martin Creed ‘Words and Music’ at the RSAMD (now Royal Conservatoire), 2007
- ‘Jardins Publics’ with Michael Lin, Apolonija Sustersic and Richard Wright for Edinburgh International Festival, 2007
- The Rodney Graham Band featuring the Amazing Rotary Psycho-Opticon, at the ABC, 2008
- Ruth Ewan ‘The Glasgow Schools’ at Scotland Street School, 2012
- Janice Kerbel ‘Doug’ in The Jeffrey Room, The Mitchell Library, 2014
- Phil Collins ‘Tomorrow is Always too Long’ in Queen's Park, 2014
- Ulla von Brandenburg ‘Sink Down Mountain, Rise Up Valley’ in Langside Halls, 2016
- Simon Starling and Graham Eatough ‘At Twilight’ at Holmwood House, 2016
- Janice Kerbel ‘Sink’ at The Western Baths Club, 2018
- 'anywhere in the universe', Rabiya Choudhry, Kate Davis, Sean Edwards, Onyeka Igwe, Yuri Pattison, across 11 of Glasgow's public libraries, 2023
