= Janice Kerbel =

British artist

- Born: 1969 (age 56–57); Canada
- Education: Goldsmiths, University of London
- Employer(s): Goldsmiths, University of London
- Title: Reader in Fine Art

Janice Kerbel (born 1969) is a British artist.

== Biography ==
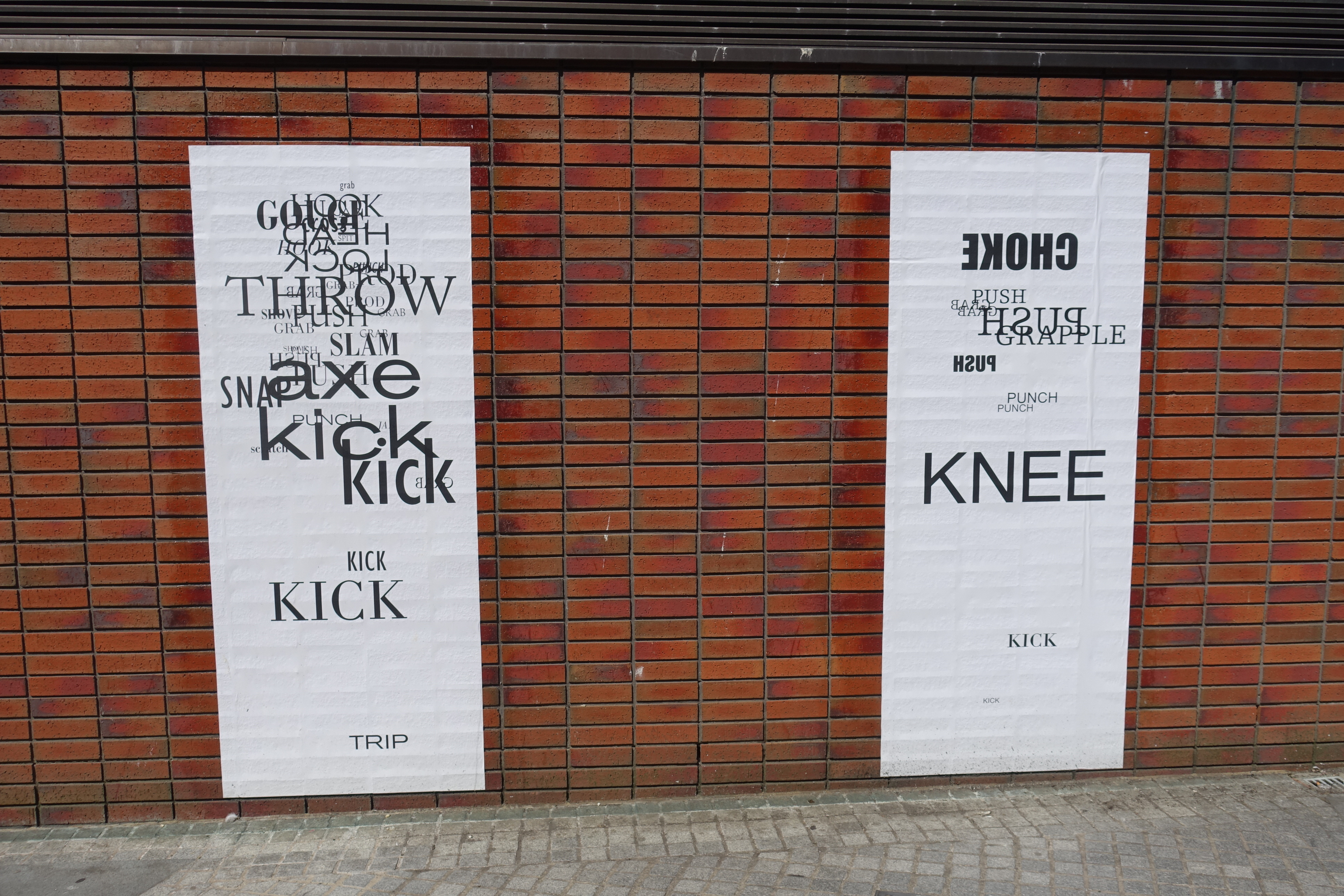
Silk screened printed banners for Fight at Liverpool Biennial 2018

Kerbel graduated from Goldsmiths College in 1996. In 2011 she won the Paul Hamlyn Foundation Award for artists. She works at Goldsmiths, University of London as a Reader in Fine Art.

She was a 2015 Turner Prize nominee along with Bonnie Camplin, Nicole Wermers, and Assemble. She experimentally works in many mediums including light, audio recordings, performance and printed materials. An example of her printed work was commissioned by Liverpool Biennial in 2018, entitled "Fight".

Another unusual piece of performance art was her use of synchronised swimmers at Glasgow's Western Baths Club for "Sink" which was commissioned by Glasgow's The Common Guild for Festival 2018, the cultural programme for the Glasgow 2018 European Championships and supported by The High Commission of Canada. Both "Fight" and "Sink" involved Kerbel choreographing the performers' movements to create her narrative. "Sink" was choreographed by Kerbel in collaboration with Adele Carlsen and Lorena Randi.

== Publications ==
- DOUG Nine songs for six voices. Kerbel, Janice. 2014. DOUG Nine songs for six voices.
- Live: Collected scripts. Kerbel, Janice. 2018. Live: Collected scripts. London UK: Occasional Papers / The Polygon Gallery / Badischer Kunsterein / University of Toronto Press. ISBN 978-0-9954730-0-3

== Solo exhibitions ==
- 2012: 'Janice Kerbel', Solo Exhibition Arts Club of Chicago. In: "Janice Kerbel", Arts Club of Chicago, United States, 13 September – 21 December 2012.
- 2014: Doug. In: "Doug", Jeffrey Room, Mitchell Library Glasgow, United Kingdom, 2014–17.
- 2015: Turner Prize 2015. In: "Turner Prize 2015", Tramway Glasgow, United Kingdom, 25 Sept 2015 – 18 January 2015.
- 2016: 'Le Grand Balcon – Montreal Biennal 2016', Group exhibition. In: "Le Grand Balcon - Montreal Biennial 2016", Musee D'Art Contemporain, Montreal, Canada, 19.10.17-15.01.17.
- 2017: Slip at Mass MOCA. In: "B6: THE ROBERT W. WILSON BUILDING GRAND OPENING Mass MoCA", MASS MoCA, United States, May 2017 – 2020.
- 2017: 'Space Force Construction', V-AC Foundation Venice Italy. In: "Space Force Construction, VAC Foundation", VAC Foundation, Palazzo delel Zattere, Venice, Italy, 13 May - 25 Aug 2017.
- 2017: Art and Alphabet. In: "Art and Alphabet", Hamburger Kunsthalle, Germany, 21 July - 29 October 2017.
- 2018: 'Beautiful World. Where are you?', Liverpool Biennial 2018. In: "Beautiful World Where are you?, 2018 Liverpool biennial", Liverpool, United Kingdom, 14 July - 28 October 2018.
- 2018: Sink: Routine for 24 Women. In: "Sink", Western Baths, Glasgow, United Kingdom, 3 August 2018.
- 2018: Janice Kerbel. In: "Janice Kerbel", greengrassi, London, United Kingdom, 27 September 2018 – 3 November 2018.
