= Anne Hardy =

British photographer

- Born: 1970 (age 55–56)
- Education: Cheltenham School of Art; Royal College of Art
- Known for: Photography, sculptural installation, audio art
- Style: Staging environments, sculptural assemblages of found objects

Anne Hardy (born 1970) is a British artist. Her art practice spans photography, sculptural installation and audio. She completed an MA in photography at the Royal College of Art in 2000, having graduated from Cheltenham School of Art in 1993 with a degree in painting. Hardy lives and works in London.

== Work ==
In her sculptural installation work Hardy constructs environments that hover between depiction and abstraction. Staging our encounters with these spaces through careful composition of physical and audio landscapes and precisely controlled perspectives, she immerses us in spaces that are at once functional and illusory.

Hardy used to destroy the structures that she made. They were built in her studio, photographed and then discarded.

These photographs of structures made in her studio were carefully constructed sets, sculptural assemblages of found objects and hand made marks. The materials she uses are often objects or junk which she has found in markets, DIY shops, or urban skips and have included antlers, brightly coloured cables, old Christmas trees, light bulbs, American basketballs, balloons, and scientific glassware as well as everyday building materials.

Other characteristics in her work are unpainted plasterboard on the walls of the rooms and visible foam sealant. Her work Lumber (2003) for example, where a neglected room houses heaps of old Christmas trees which have been hidden from the world and left to decay. Hardy's work has been published in two monographs: Anne Hardy - Secession (published 2012 by Secession) and Anne Hardy - TWIN FIELDS, FIELD, Fieldworks (published 2016 by The Common Guild and Dent–de–Leone).

Her work also features in Vitamin PH: New Perspectives in Photography (2006) by Phaidon Press and Charlotte Cotton's book The Photograph as Contemporary Art as well as magazines including Dazed & Confused, The Guardian, Photography Now, Tank (magazine) and Art Review. In January 2007, she gave an interview to The Guardian newspaper on the subject of her image Untitled VI (2005).

In March 2007, the Victoria and Albert Museum (V&A), London exhibited Anne Hardy's 2005 work Untitled IV (balloons). The V&A bought the image for their collection with the help of the Cecil Beaton art fund. In June 2007, three of Hardy's works, Booth (2006), Untitled IV (balloons) (2005) and Close Range (2006), were exhibited at the 52nd International Venice Biennale art festival. The accompanying New Forest Pavilion exhibition catalogue included the image Outpost (2007) and a critical essay by John Slyce.

In April 2008, Hardy had her first USA solo exhibition in New York at Bellwether Gallery. This was followed with Hardy's work being included in a group show at Gagosian Gallery, New York called Untitled (Vicarious): Photographing the Constructed Object which ran from September until December 2008. Hardy's work was shown in the Helsinki Biennale which ran until 25 January 2009.

In September 2012, Hardy had a solo exhibition at the Secession in Vienna and a substantial monograph was published to accompany the exhibition.

Kunstverein Freiburg hosted a solo exhibition of Anne Hardy in September 2014, comprising a large sculptural installation with audio, as well as photographic works.

In October 2014 - January 2015 Anne Hardys sculptural installation 'Two Joined Fields' was included in the exhibition 'Mirrorcity' at the Hayward Gallery in London, alongside six large photo structures on the Hayward sculpture terraces. From June 2015-August 2015 she held a solo exhibition at The Common Guild in Glasgow.

In 2019, Hardy created The Depth of Darkness, the Return of the Light, a site-specific installation commissioned by the Tate Britain Winter Commission.
