= Carol Bove =

American artist based in New York City

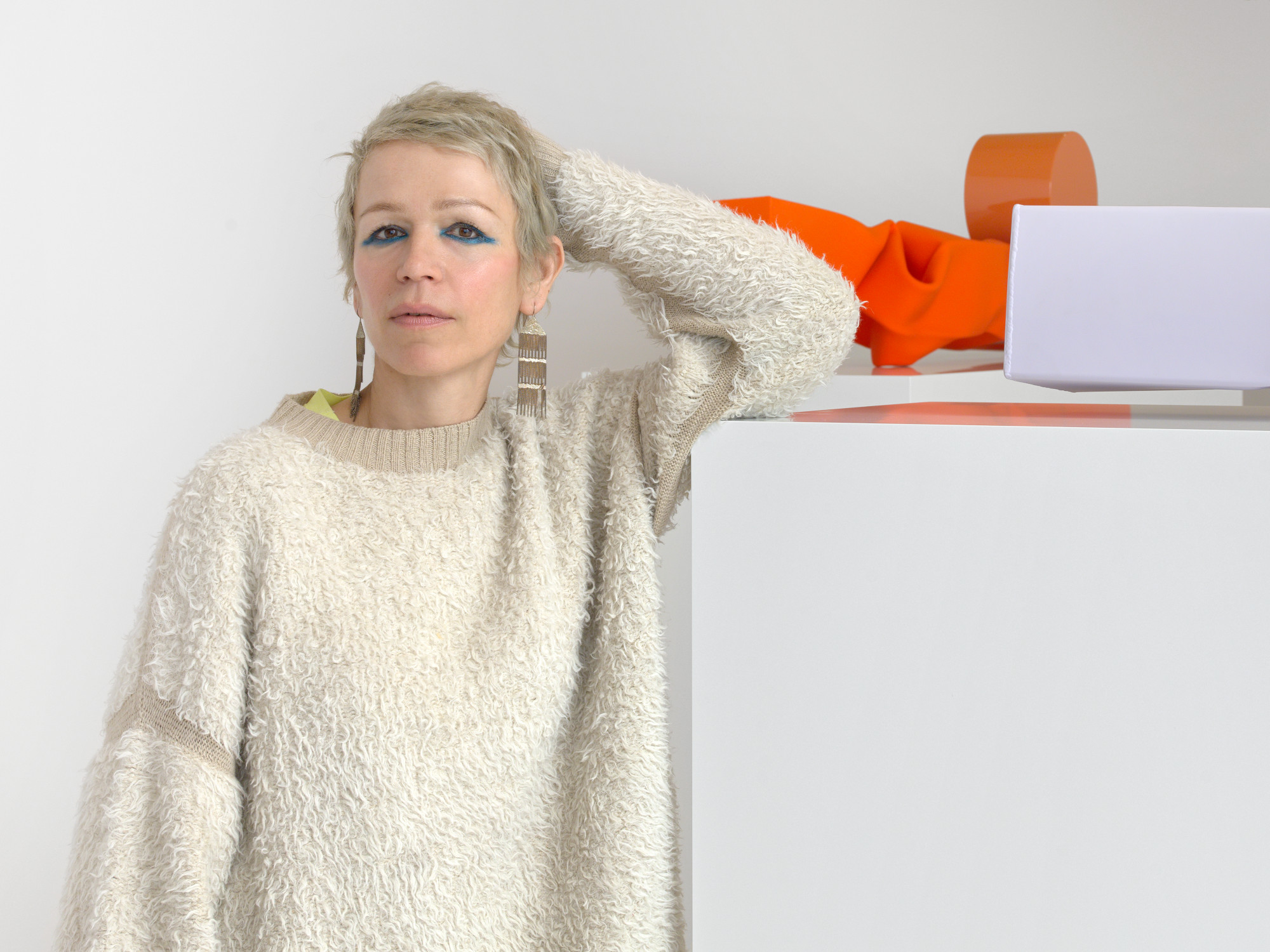
Carol Bove photographed by Annik Wetter

Carol Bove (born 1971) is an American artist based in New York City.

== Early life and education ==
Born in 1971 in Geneva, Switzerland to American parents during a vacation trip, Bove (pronounced bo-VAY) was raised in Berkeley, California. Her father is a housepainter who studied art in Paris. Her mother worked as a junior-high science teacher.

Bove dropped out of Berkeley High School after the 11th grade. She eventually obtained an equivalency diploma and moved to New York in the 1990s, where she graduated from New York University in 2000. She was an artist-in-residence at Yale University Art Gallery in 2010, where she pursued research on the history of architecture on the Yale campus and the effect of changing tastes in painting conservation on the Gallery's collection.

Between 2009 and 2013, Bove was a clinical associate professor of studio art in Steinhardt School’s Department of Art and Art Professions at NYU.

== Work ==
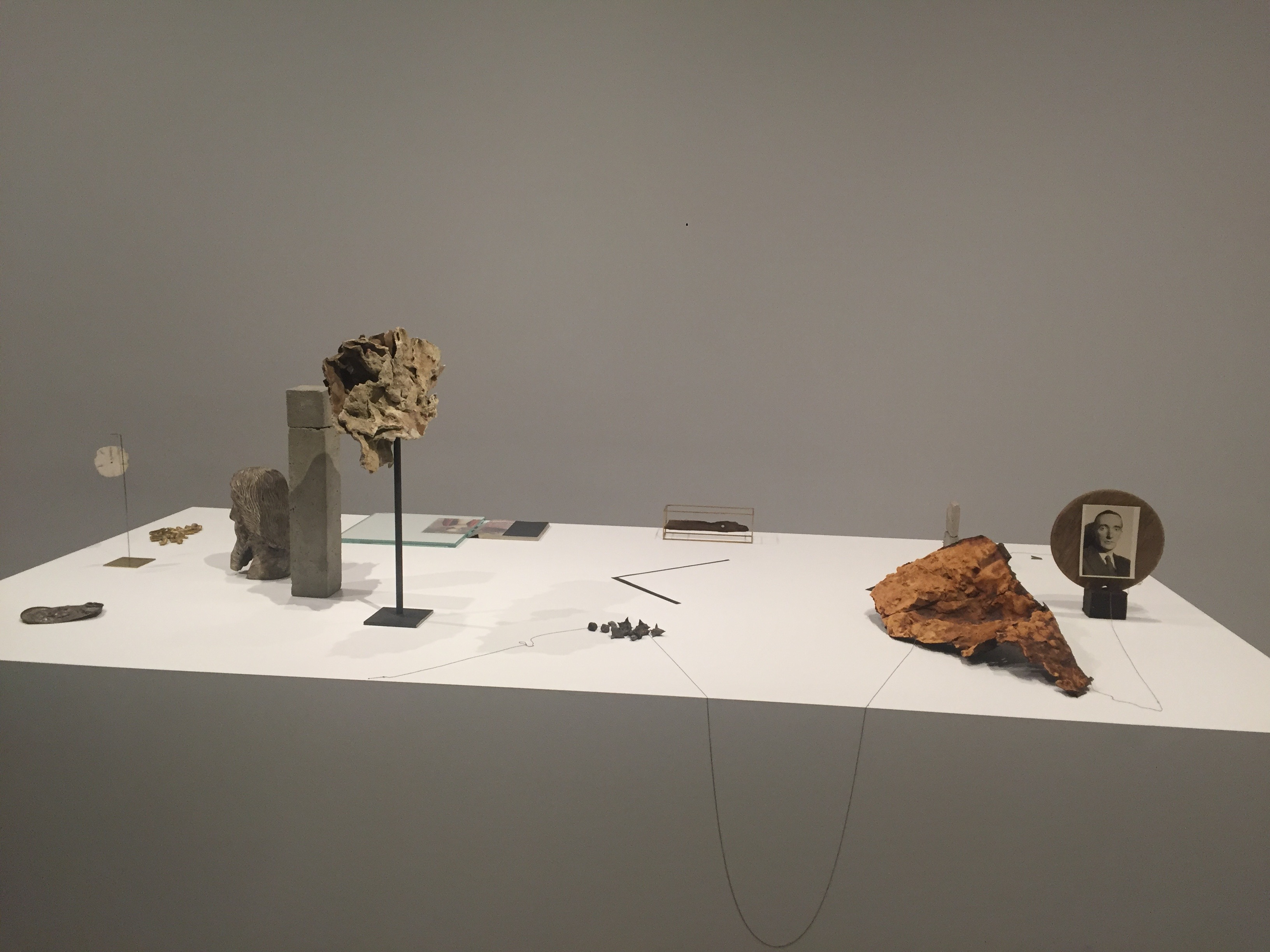
La Traversee difficile (The difficult crossing), 2008. Steel, glass, silver, wood, concrete, wax, bronze, brass, aluminum, seeds, coral, insulating foam, paper, shells, rocks, and found photograph. 73 5/8 x 98 x 48 inches (187 x 243.8 x 121.9 cm). La Coleccion Jumex, Mexico City.

Using a wide range of materials, including steel, concrete, books, driftwood, peacock feathers, seashells, and foam, Bove’s diverse practice encompasses sculpture, installation, and drawing. Her oeuvre plays with questions of materiality, re-presenting and updating historical strategies of display. As the art historian Johanna Burton notes, "Bove brings things together not to nudge associative impulses into free play driven by the unconscious, but rather to conjure a kind of affective tangle that disrupts any singular, historical narrative."

Bove is perhaps best known for her large-scale sculptures, which she has described as "big, heavy, but fragile." Her sculptures are often displayed outside or in public spaces. For example, the steel and petrified wood sculpture Lingam was installed in City Hall Park in New York as part of the 2016 summer group exhibition, The Language of Things, while Bove’s 2013 show, Caterpillar, featured seven large-scale sculptures specifically created for the High Line at the Rail Yards in New York.

Earlier works by Bove range in form and medium from ink drawings of nude women taken from vintage Playboy magazines to sculptures composed of curated bookshelves featuring volumes from the 1960s and 70s. In past exhibitions, Bove has also included the work of other artists in her installations. In a 2007 show at Maccarone, she presented work by the artist Bruce Conner, Berkeley book dealer Philip Smith, and painter Wilfred Lang. Similarly, Bove designed her 2014 installation, Setting for A. Pomodoro, which features a baroque assemblage of driftwood, peacock feathers, pedestals, and bases, as a setting for a sculpture by the Italian Modernist Arnaldo Pomodoro. Every time the installation has been exhibited, it has featured a different Pomodoro sculpture.

In 2016, after working from a studio in Red Hook, Brooklyn for many years, Bove moved her practice to a 15,000-square-foot space within a former brick factory near the Brooklyn waterfront.

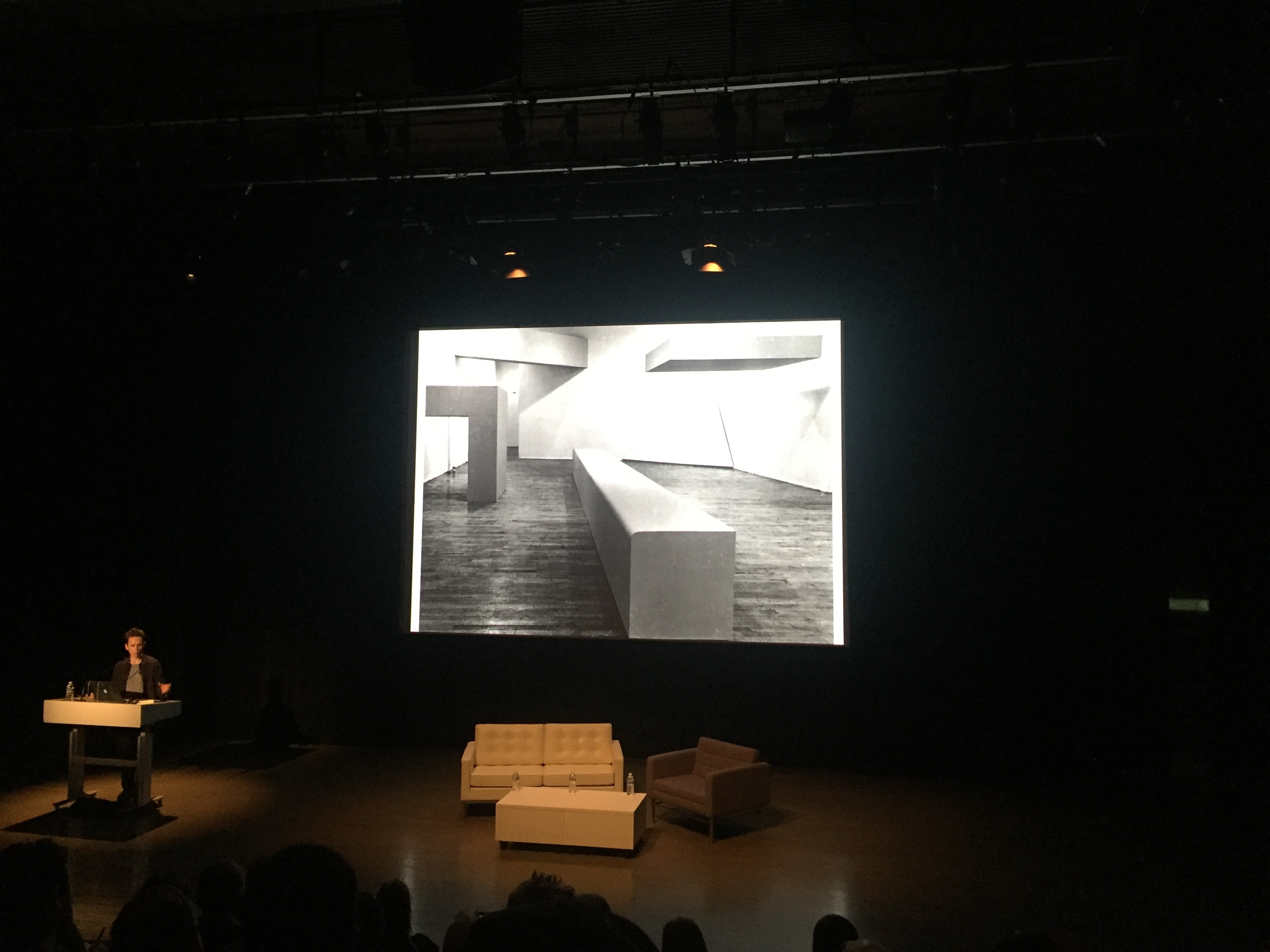
Carol Bove's talk in ICA, Boston. The artist's discussion on how interior architecture influences her artwork.

== Exhibitions ==
Since she started exhibiting in the late 1990s, Bove’s work has been the subject of several solo exhibitions, including The Museum of Modern Art, New York; The Common Guild, Glasgow (both 2013); Palais de Tokyo, Paris (2010); Horticultural Society of New York (2009); Blanton Museum of Art, Austin, Texas (2006); Kunsthalle Zürich; Institute of Contemporary Art Boston (both 2004); and the Kunstverein Hamburg (2003). In 2017, Bove represented Switzerland at the 57th Venice Biennale. Other major group exhibitions include Documenta 13, Kassel, Germany (2012); the 54th Venice Biennale (2011); and the Whitney Biennial, Whitney Museum of American Art, New York (2008).

Bove's sculptures were part of the High Line Show Caterpillar, one of the last opportunities to see the undeveloped High Line.

In 2021, the Nasher Sculpture Center's exhibition titled "Carol Bove: Collage Sculptures" became Bove's first major museum exhibition focusing solely on her steel sculptures. The Curator of the show, Dr. Catherine Craft remarked: “The materials, processes, and syntax of Bove’s nascent sculptures seemed profoundly familiar to me, but there were, thrillingly, elements of the unknown, as if this long-familiar approach to sculpture could lead into places not yet imagined.”

In 2021, Bove received The Facade Commission at the Metropolitan Museum of Art; for the commission she created The séances aren’t helping.

Her work was included in the 2024 exhibition Making Their Mark: Works from the Shah Garg Collection at the Berkeley Art Museum and Pacific Film Archive (BAMPFA).

In 2026, the Solomon R. Guggenheim Museum in New York is exhibiting Carol Bove, “the first museum survey of [her] work” and featuring work from her more than 25 year career and curated by Katherine Brinson. The exhibit was accompanied by a catalog edited by Brinson (ISBN 978-0-892-07570-6).

== Collections ==
Work by the artist is represented in permanent collections worldwide, including the Whitney Museum of American Art, New York; Fonds Régional d’Art Contemporain (FRAC) Nord-Pas de Calais, Dunkerque, France; Colección Jumex, Mexico City; the Institute of Contemporary Art, Boston; the Solomon R. Guggenheim Museum, New York; Museum of Modern Art, New York; the Princeton University Art Museum, New Jersey; the Wadsworth Atheneum Museum of Art, Hartford, Connecticut; the Yale University Art Gallery, New Haven, Connecticut; and the Museum of Contemporary Art Helga de Alvear in Cáceres, Spain, among others.

== Other activities ==
Bove has been a member of the SculptureCenter's board of trustees since 2012; she was appointed as the board's chair in 2020.

== Art market ==
Bove has been represented by Gagosian Gallery since 2023. From 2011 and 2023, she worked with David Zwirner Gallery and Maccarone.

== Personal life ==
Bove lived in a 19th-century home near the studio in Brooklyn until her 2021 divorce from the artist Gordon Terry. From 2021 to 2026, she lived in an apartment at Rosario Candela's 41 Fifth Avenue, which she had bought for $2.9 million.
