= Independent Curators International =

Independent Curators International (ICI) is a non-profit headquartered in New York City that has produced exhibitions, events, publications, and training opportunities since 1975.

== History ==
Independent Curators International (ICI) was founded in 1975 by Susan Sollins, Executive Producer and Curator of Art:21, and Nina Castelli Sundell, who is the daughter of art dealers Leo Castelli and Ileana Sonnabend. The organization's goal it to make contemporary art available through traveling exhibitions. The organization is as a contemporary art center, without an exhibition space, that shows new art by well-known and lesser-known artists.

== Publications ==
Here are a few of the books they have worked on:

- Milena Kalinovska; Paulo Herkenhoff; Independent Curators International. Beyond preconceptions: the sixties experiment. Independent Curators International (ICI); September 2000. ISBN 978-0-916365-58-5
- Mary-Kay Lombino; Philip K. Dick; Independent Curators International. UnNaturally. Independent Curators International; 1 May 2003. ISBN 978-0-916365-66-0.
- José Roca; Bruce Sterling; Independent Curators International. Museo de Arte Banco de la República (Bogotá, Colombia). Phantasmagoria: specters of absence. Independent Curators International; 1 October 2007. ISBN 978-0-916365-76-9.
- Ralph Rugoff; Lynne Tillman; Independent Curators International. Shoot the family. Independent Curators International; March 2006. ISBN 978-0-916365-73-8
- The Paper Sculpture Book, introduction by curators Mary Ceruti, Matt Freedman, and Sina Najafi, Essay by Frances Richard (Cabinet Books, Independent Curators International & SculptureCenter, 2003). ISBN 9780916365691, 0916365697
