= 2013 Turner Prize =

British prize for contemporary art

The 2013 Turner Prize was won by the French artist Laure Prouvost. The prize exhibition was held at Building 80/81, Ebrington Square in Derry~Londonderry, from 23 October 2013 to 5 January 2014, as part of the UK City of Culture celebrations. The building, a former army barracks converted into offices, was transformed into a temporary art gallery for the Turner show, and returned to offices afterwards The awards ceremony was held at Ebrington on 2 December 2013. It was the first-time the exhibition and prize ceremony were held outside England.

The prize jury for 2013 was chaired by Penelope Curtis, director of Tate Britain, and also included Annie Fletcher, curator of exhibitions at the Van Abbemuseum in Eindhoven; Susanne Gaensheimer, director of the Museum für Moderne Kunst in Frankfurt; Declan Long, lecturer at the National College of Art and Design in Dublin; and Ralph Rugoff, director of the Hayward Gallery.

The winning entry by Prouvost has two elements, an installation including collage and film shown at Whitechapel Art Gallery for the Max Mara Art Prize for Women, and a 30-minute film installation named Wantee, commissioned with Grizedale Arts and made in response to the artist Kurt Schwitters and first shown at the "Schwitters in Britain" exhibition at Tate Britain in London. The Scwtters installation was recreated at Ebrington: in a tea party setting a film describes a fictional story between Prouvost's grandfather (who was a friend of Schwitters in real life) and Schwitters. The work is named in reference to the habit of Schwitters' partner Edith Thomas of asking guests if they "want tea". The panel described the work as "outstanding for its complex and courageous combination of images and objects in a deeply atmospheric environment".

The other nominees were Tino Sehgal for performance works at the Turbine Hall at Tate Modern and dOCUMENTA (13) in Kassel; David Shrigley for a retrospective at the Hayward Gallery, in Ireland he showed a mechanical boy shown as a life art which visitors were encouraged to draw; and Lynette Yiadom-Boakye, for portrait paintings of imaginary subjects at her first solo exhibition at Chisenhale Gallery.

The £25,000 first prize was presented by the Irish actress Saoirse Ronan. The other nominees were awarded £5,000 each.
