= Rory Pilgrim =

British artist

- Born: Rory Pilgrim; 1988 (age 37–38); Bristol, England
- Education: Chelsea School of Art and Design (BA) (2005–08); De Ateliers (2008–10)
- Awards: Prix de Rome (Netherlands) (2019); Stichting C.o.C.A. Award (2013)
- Website: rorypilgrim.com

Rory Pilgrim (born 1988 in Bristol, England) is a British artist who lives and works in the Netherlands and the Isle of Portland.

== Career ==
Initially Pilgrim was drawn to music, he studied classical music and sung in a cathedral choir when he was young and was part of two pop bands while a teenager. Later he came to art for the 'open space' it provided. After an initial art education in the UK, Pilgrim since 2008 continued their career home basing in the Netherlands where they received recognition by Dutch contemporary art institutions including the Stedelijk Museum in Amsterdam.

Pilgrim's work is influenced by socially engaged art, as well as activist and feminist traditions. The creation of the work often entails social processes, involving other people through collaborations, workshops, and dialogues. The artistic media used by Pilgrim include life performance, video art, installation, music composition, and drawing, The Stedelijk Museum Amsterdam described Pilgrim's work as creating spaces "..where people of diverse backgrounds can come together and develop new forms of understanding and caretaking..".

In 2019 Pilgrim was awarded the Prix de Rome (Netherlands), for his work The Undercurrent. Pilgrim developed The Undercurrent during an artist residency at MING Studios in Boise, Idaho, and the work revolves around a group of young people from Boise. It explores the intricate interplay between their individual struggles and broader societal issues. These encompass a spectrum of concerns, spanning from climate change to gender equality.

Pilgrim was nominated for the 2023 Turner Prize for the work RAFTS. While working on RAFTS, Pilgrim indicated that it "in many ways, is a second chapter to The Undercurrent and explores intersections between mental health and the climate crisis."

=== Solo & duo exhibitions ===
- pink & green, Chisenhale Gallery, London, UK, 2024
- Radio Ballads, Serpentine Gallery, London, UK, 2022
- HOP to HOPE: Rory Pilgrim, Wäinö Aaltonen Museum of Art, Turku, Finland, 2022
- The Undercurrent, Badischer Kunstverein, Karsruhe, Germany, 2020
- The Resounding Bell, Between Bridges, Berlin, Germany, 2019
- Software Garden, MING Studios, Boise, USA, 2019

=== Performances ===
- RAFTS Live, Cadogan Hall, Serpentine Galleries, London, UK, 2022
- Software Garden, Centre Pompidou, Paris, France, 2021
- As close to the future as possible, South London Gallery, London, UK, 2018
- Open, Stedelijk Museum Amsterdam, Amsterdam, the Netherlands, 2012
- Women and Children: What has made this building last?, Stedelijk Museum Amsterdam, Amsterdam, the Netherlands, 2010

=== Screenings ===
- The Undercurrent, Museum of Modern Art (MoMA), New York, USA, 2022
- RAFTS, Kunsthuis SYB, Beetsterzwaag, the Netherlands, 2022

== Collections ==
- Tate Collection, UK
- Arts Council England, UK
- Bonnefantenmuseum, NL
