= Milena Kalinovska =

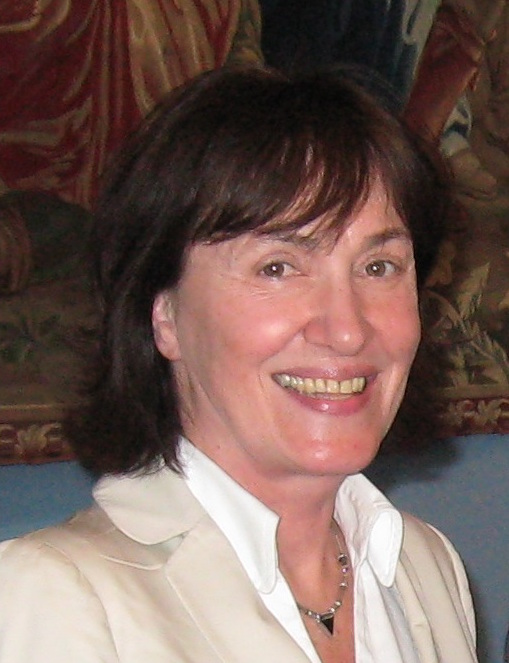
Milena Kalinovska

Milena Kalinovska (born 1948) is a curator of visual arts and art educator. She has Czech and Russian ancestry, and is a triple national with British, American and Czech citizenship. She was nominated for the Turner Prize in its second year, 1985.

She was director of public programs and education at the Hirshhorn Museum and Sculpture Garden in Washington, D.C., from 2004–2015 and she became director of the modern and contemporary art collection at the National Gallery in Prague in 2015. Previously, Kalinovska served as director of the Institute of Contemporary Art, Boston and as adjunct curator at the New Museum of Contemporary Art in New York.

Kalinovska has worked with artists including Richard Deacon, Felix Gonzalez-Torres, Nan Goldin, Antony Gormley, Magdalena Jetelova, Isaac Julien, Cildo Meireles, Annette Messager, Mariko Mori, Ilya Kabakov, On Kawara, Jiri Kolar, Stanislav Kolibal, Edward Krasinski, Richard Prince, Adriena Simotova, Nancy Spero, Bill Viola, Kara Walker, and Lawrence Weiner.

== Early and personal life ==
Kalinovska was born in Prague. Her father Adolf worked in the film industry for film director Miloš Forman; his family were furniture manufacturers in Moravia. Her mother's parents left the Soviet Union after the Russian Revolution and moved to Prague, where her grandfather became the founder of the Slavonic library at the Charles University in Prague. Her mother Věra was an accountant at TESLA, but lost her job in the 1950s due to her white Russian ancestry and then worked shifts in a factory.

She grew up in the Strašnice district of Prague, speaking Russian at home with her maternal family. She became interested in art at a young age, and was a teenager during the Prague Spring of 1968. She began to study law at Charles University, and spent time in the UK as an au pair after the Russian invasion of Czechoslovakia in August 1968, returning to Prague in 1969. She joined a group tourist trip to London in 1970, and she claimed political asylum. Subsequently, she was given a 3-year prison sentence in communist Czechoslovakia, and was stripped of her Czechoslovak citizenship for her dissident activities (her Czech citizenship was restored after the Velvet Revolution).

In England, Kalinovska studied at the University of Essex, graduating in 1975 with a bachelor's degree in comparative literature and art. She then received a master's degree in Slavonic studies from the University of British Columbia in Canada in 1980 while also attending non-credit courses in museum studies at the UBC Museum of Anthropology, and then turned to the arts. She is a graduate of the Getty Leadership Institute at Claremont Graduate University in Los Angeles, California.

She married Jan Vaňous in 1986; he is a Yale-educated economist and consultant who was also born in Czechoslovakia, and moved to the US in 1970. They have two children, Milena V. Vaňous and Jan M. Vaňous.

== Career ==
Kalinovska was exhibitions director at the Riverside Studios in London from during 1981-86, and then associate director for exhibitions during 1986-89.

After moving to the US in 1986, she was an adjunct curator at the New Museum of Contemporary Art in New York for one year from 1989 to 1990, and then succeeded David A. Ross as director at the Institute of Contemporary Art, Boston from 1991 to 1997. She was director of public programs and education at the Smithsonian Institution's Hirshhorn Museum and Sculpture Garden in Washington, D.C., from 2004 to 2015. While at the Hirshhorn, she initiated and oversaw a wide range of learning experiences, including talks, lectures, panel discussions, and symposia. She introduced new gallery interpretation programs, performance events, and educational initiatives.

Kalinovska has also worked as an independent curator organizing numerous exhibitions including "Beyond Preconceptions: The Sixties Experiment", which toured major museums in Europe, South America, and the USA, and "Art into Life: Russian Constructivism 1914 to 1935", at the Walker Art Center in Minneapolis and Henry Art Gallery in Seattle. She was one of four curators of the 2004 Gwangju Biennale in South Korea, and has served on the national advisory committee of Art:21 for PBS. She has organized many international exhibitions as an independent curator.

She became director of modern and contemporary art collection at the National Gallery in Prague in 2015.

== Awards ==
Kalinovska is the recipient of several awards including the Tomas Alva Negri Award for "Beyond Preconceptions: The Sixties Experiment", and the Penny McCall Foundation Grant established to honour curatorial efforts supporting the visual arts in the US. She was honoured by the President's Committee on the Arts and Humanities (under Bill Clinton) for "Docent-Teens," the youth museum guide program at the ICA, Boston.

Kalinovska was nominated for the Turner Prize in 1985. She is one of only two non-artists ever to be nominated for the Turner Prize. Her personal papers from her time at Riverside Studios are at the Tate Archives, London.
