= Jasleen Kaur =

Scottish artist (born 1986)

Jasleen Kaur (born 1986) is a Scottish artist, and the winner of the 2024 Turner Prize. She works with mixed-media including installations, sculpture, sound art, and writing, and has a socially-engaged arts practice. Kaur was awarded the prize for her exhibition "Alter Altar", which was on display at Tramway, Glasgow, March - October 2023. Kaur was the youngest nominee on the list. In her acceptance speech for the prize, Kaur wore a Palestinian flag, and urged the Tate and other arts organisations to join artists "calling for a Gaza ceasefire and institutional divestment from ties to Israel".

Kaur is Somerset House Studios resident, and was a recipient of a Paul Hamlyn Foundation award in 2021.

== Early life and education ==
Kaur was born in Glasgow in 1986, and grew up there in the Pollokshields area.

Kaur graduated from the Silversmithing and Jewellery department of the Glasgow School of Art in 2008, and studied Applied Art at the Royal College of Art, London from 2009 to 2010.

== Works ==
=== "Be Like Teflon" (2021) ===
"Be Like Teflon" was installed at Copperfield Gallery, London, and was Kaur's first London solo show. The exhibition included a film Ethnoresidue, and a book Be Like Teflon. The book was first published in 2019, and expands the form of a recipe book and "uncovers the untold, hidden herstories of Indian women living in Britain commissioned by Panel and Glasgow Women’s Library".

=== "Gut Feelings Meri Jaan" (2022) ===
Kaur was commissioned by Touchstone, Rochdale, to create work inspired by their archives. Kaur collaborated with local South Asian women and gender non conforming people to create Gut Feelings Meri Jaan, a series of films which explored "the voices of migrant communities within the social history of Rochdale which have historically been marginalised and misrepresented". The art historian Alice Correia collaborated with Kaur to publish a book of the same name, reflecting on some of the themes of the exhibition.

=== "Alter Altar" (2023, 2024) ===
"Alter Altar" is a multi-media installation work, with "sculpture, photography, sound and writing", first shown at the Tramway in Glasgow in 2023. The assemblage includes "family photos in Irn-Bru resin, tracksuits", and a Ford Escort covered with an "enormous hand-crocheted doily". Kaur has said that the car is a "representation of my dad’s migrant desires". The sound element of the piece was created with the Welsh singer and teacher Marged Siôn.

The work was redisplayed at the Tate Britain Turner Prize exhibition in 2024. The Turner Prize judges commented on the "considered way in which [Kaur] weaves together the personal, political and spiritual in her exhibition".

== Personal life ==
Kaur lives and works in London.
