= Roger Hiorns =

British Contemporary artist (born 1980)

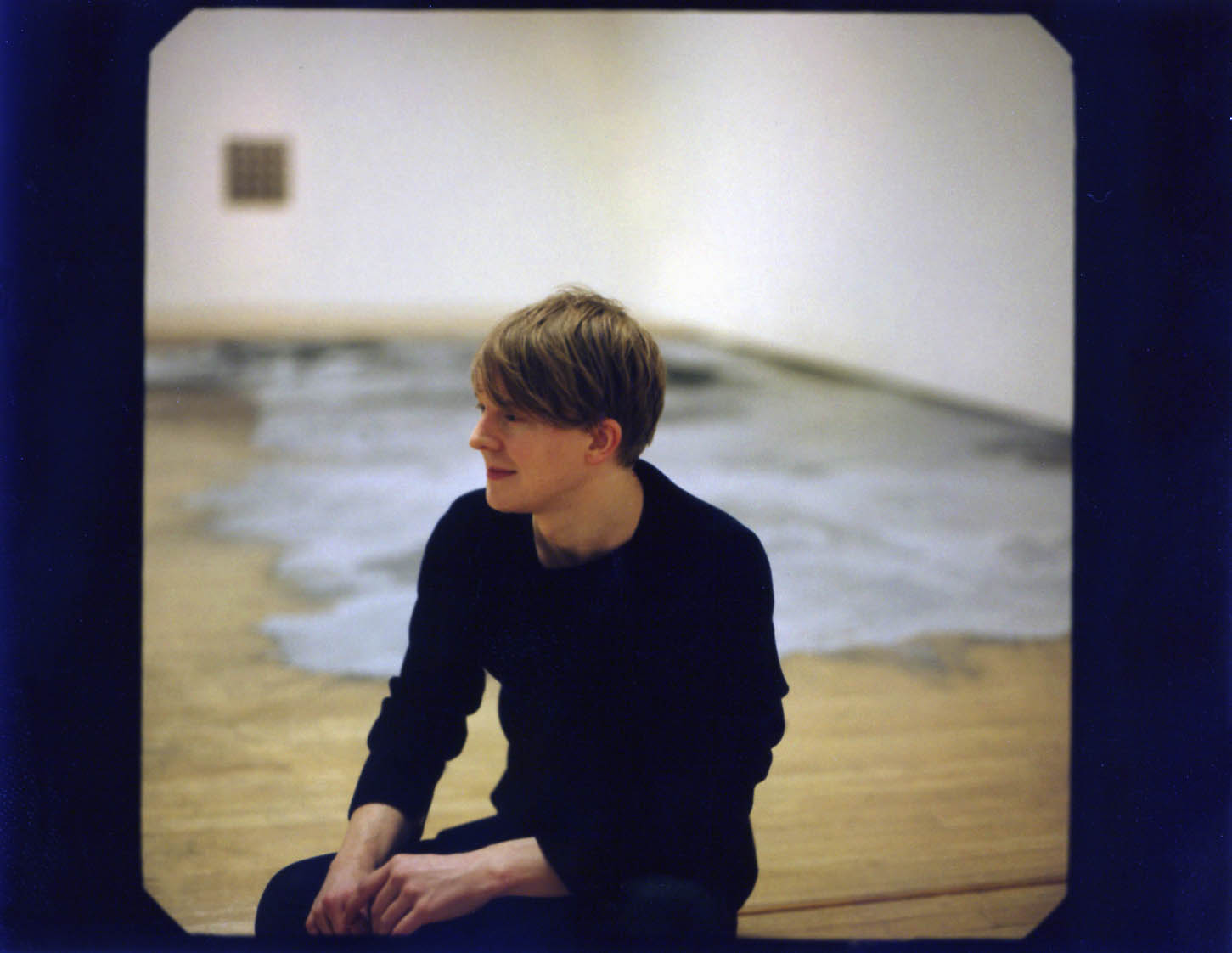
Roger Hiorns at Tate Britain in 2009

Roger Hiorns RA (born 1975) is a British artist based in London. His primary media is sculpture and installation, using a wide variety of materials, including metals, wood and plastics. He also works in the media of video and photography.

== Education ==
Hiorns was born in Birmingham. He attended the Bournville College of Art from 1991 to 1993, and Goldsmiths, University of London in London from 1993 to 1996. He lives in London.

== Methods ==
Hiorns makes work, based around a progressive idea of pushing forward and deviating from the established traditions of sculpture. He proposes new forms alongside the adaptation, re-use and transformation of existing objects.

His approach is both layered and expansive, with the works' individual elements emerging in a provocatively ambiguous manner. This ambiguity resists a reductionist interpretation, and is not easily described in a linear fashion, the first level of meaning or symbolism that presents itself is not the end point of the work, and the works complexity escapes a fully successful interpretation under the current conditions of understanding. Hiorns represents a generation that has been strongly influenced by conceptual approaches but that is also more engaged in taking a stand against the changing nature of authority and power structures in today's Euro-American civilisation, including the related societal schisms.

Hiorns asks the question, what should the future of object making meaningfully represent, what shape does politics take, and what future can we anticipate in the objects made in the present?

In his work, Hiorns proposes a positive mistrust of our surroundings, the traps inherent within the objects of the world. Hiorns proposes that a way of escaping into the real world, by revealing the true state of things and by breaking through the shell forced on us by society and convention can be enacted upon by the 'Insulting' of objects and applied authority.

Detergent foam bubbles produced by compressors; cold sheets of latex rubber alongside BBC programs on medical ethics; pure alcohol burning in cotton wool alongside a naked youth; mechanical parts ground to dust; the brain tissues of animals smeared on fibreglass; semen wiped over the surface of light bulbs, a light filter to claim a territory. He uses materials to affect transformations on found objects, social encounters and urban situations. Fictional scenarios are made real, fire emerges from storm drains, perfume permeates metal surfaces, and crystals colonise industrial objects, naked youths contemplate fire, a clear plastic object becomes the focus of prayer, a boys' choir play dead, a proposal to bury a passenger jet plane.

== Seizure ==
In 2008 he created a sculpture and installation in South London where he materially claimed an entire ex-council flat, growing within it an industrialised scale of copper sulphate crystals. Seventy-five thousand litres of solution were pumped into the waterproofed council flat to create a crystalline growth on the walls, floor, ceiling and bath of this abandoned dwelling. Described as a 'Cult hit' and 'destined to be remembered as one of the truly worthwhile and significant moments of modern British art' by The Guardian, the project was called Seizure and was produced by Artangel. In 2009 Seizure and the artist's solo exhibition at Corvi-Mora were nominated for The Turner Prize. The work was a source of inspiration for the Icelandic recording artist Björk, on the song "Crystalline".

The flats were set to be demolished in 2011, and the Arts Council Collection acquired Seizure. It was removed from the building and transported to Yorkshire Sculpture Park.

== vCJD exhibition ==
In 2015 Hiorns created a work for the Hayward gallery London. The work proposes an intensely researched timeline on the subject of the animal disease BSE and the human disease vCJD. The work was an intensive reflection on the 'systemic violence' within society and the appropriate aesthetic response to authority that a living person may now evoke. The work proposes a timeline originating from a central origin, that of the UK in the mid 1970s, and the subsequent spread to other global territories. This spread can be mapped and the timeline can continue to be exhibited in other infected territories in the future.

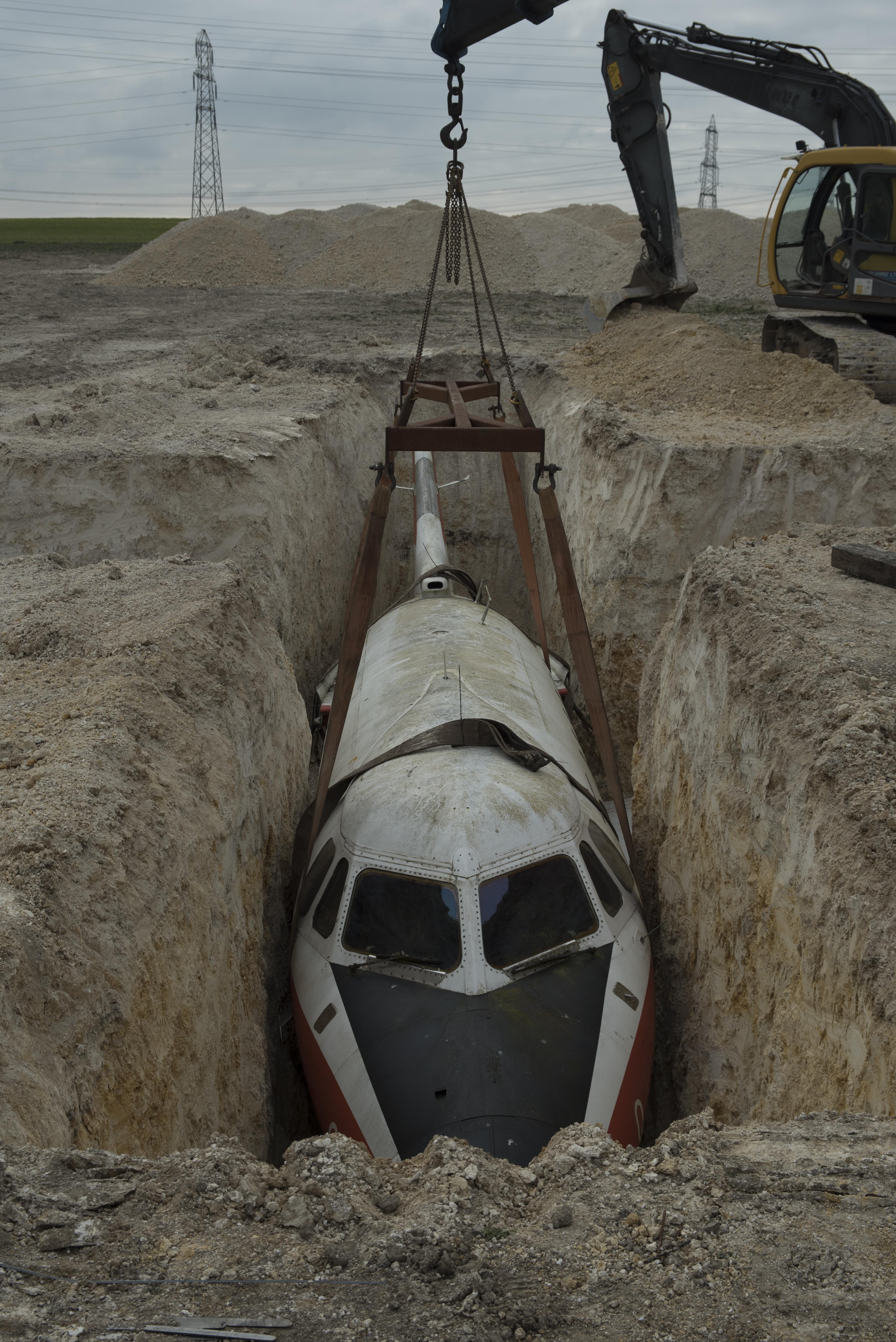
The retrospective view of the pathway 1990–2016

== Buried passenger aircraft (Pathways) ==
In the summer of 2016, Roger Hiorns buried a military passenger aircraft into a hill in the east of England. The burial marked the first occasion in which a series of buried aircraft will occur across the globe in what the artist describes to be a global network of buried passenger aircraft. Aircraft are to be, or have been, buried on all continents across the globe.

The artist describes the act of burying the craft, each craft with differing contextual references and uses, based on their final location, as 'another stage in the evolution on object making against the established world of objects'. 'That a worldly object and its intentions can somehow be readapted, or "insulted"'. 'That the human occupant of the newly buried plane will become influenced and more attuned to the powerful systems we pass through.'

The artwork is called: The retrospective view of the pathway, (pathways), 1990-2016 Buried passenger aircraft.

== Collections ==
Hiorns' work is held by many international collections including the Tate, The Walker Art Centre, The Museum of Modern Art, NY, and Art Institute of Chicago.

== Monographic publications ==
JJ Charlesworth, David Korecký, Felicity Lunn, "Roger Hiorns", Verlag für moderne Kunst, Czech Republic

"Roger Hiorns: Seizure 2008/2013", Yorkshire Sculpture Park, Wakefield (cat)

"Roger Hiorns", De Hallen Haarlem, The Netherlands (cat)

"Roger Hiorns - Untitled", Hayward Publishing, UK

"Seizure: Roger Hiorns ", Artangel, UK

"Roger Hiorns", Cornerhouse Publications, Milton Keynes Gallery, UK

== Other publications ==
2015

Heather Pesanti, Ann Reynolds, Lawrence Weschler, Alva Noë, "Strange Pilgrims", The Contemporary Austin, Texas, pp. 78–87

2014

"The Twenty First Century Art Book", Phaidon, London, p. 119

"Quiz", Manuella Editions, p. 102

British Council, "Private Utopia: Contemporary Art From the British Council Collection", The Asahi Shimbun, Japan, pp. 72–73

2013

Massimiliano Gioni, "Il Palazzo Enciclopedico", Fondazione La Biennale di Venezia

Hans Ulrich Obrist, "DO IT, The Compendium", Independent Curators International, New York, p. 208

2012

Hans Ulrich Obrist and Rem Koolhaas, "London Dialogues: Serpentine Gallery 24-Hour Interview Marathon", Skira Editore, Milan, pp. 169 – 175

"Made in the UK; Contemporary Art from the Richard Brown Baker Collection", Museum of Art, Rhode Island School of Design, pp. 40–41

Hossein Amirsadeghi, "Sanctuary: Britain’s Artists and their Studios", Thames and Hudson, London

2011

Peter Eleey, "September 11", MoMA PS1, pp. 134–134

Charles Jencks, "The Story of Post Modernism", Wiley, pp. 49, 188-189

Mark Von Schlegell, "New Dystopia", Sternberg Press, pp. 91 & 152

"The Shape of Things To Come: New Sculpture", Saatchi Gallery, London, pp. 48–53, 114

Lisa Le Feuvre and Tom Morton, "British Art Show 7: In the Days of the Comet", Hayward Publishing, London, pp. 86–89

2010

Henry Werner, "Modern Art For Sale: Les Plus Grandes Foires et Salons d’Art Au Monde", Feymedia, Düsseldorf, p. 169

"Contemporary Collecting: The Donna and Howard Stone Collection", Art Institute of Chicago, p. 141

"Gerhard Richter and the disappearance of the image in contemporary art", Centro di Cultura Contemporanea Strozzina, Palazzo Strozzi, Florence, Alias, pp. 96–101

2009

David Bussel, "Looking at Display. Images of Contemporary Art in London Galleries", Rachmaninoffs, London, p. 23

Christian Rattemeyer, Brian Sholis, "The Judith Rothschild Foundation Contemporary Drawing Collection: Catalogue Raisonne", The Museum of Modern Art, New York

Hans Ulrich Obrist, "Experiment Marathon", Reykjavik Art Museum, Serpentine Gallery, Koenig Books, pp. 66, 74–75, 112, 123, 137

"The Quick and the Dead", Walker Art Center, pp. 222–223

"British Council Collection: Passports", British Council, Cover, pp. 100–101

"Passports. In Viaggio Con L’Arte", Silvana Editoriale, Milano, pp. 106–107

"Voids: A Retrospective", JRP Ringier, Zürich and Ecart Publications, Geneva, p. 306

"Passports", British Council Collection, British Council, London

2008

Tom Morton, "Expenditure", Contemporary Art Exhibition, Busan Biennale, pp. 146–147

Hans Ulrich Obrist, "Formulas For Now", Thames and Hudson, p. 86

Alexis Vaillant, "Legende", Sternberg Press, Berlin

"Semaines, Digestive System", Analogues, Les Presses du Reel, pp. 37–48

"New Perspectives in Sculpture and Installation", Vitamin 3-D, Phaidon, pp. 150–151

2007

Judith Collins, "Sculpture Today", Phaidon, pp. 202–203

"You Have Not Been Honest", Cornerhouse Publications, British Council

"Destroy Athens", 1st Athens Biennale, pp. 158–159

"Voids", Centre Pomipdou, Kunsthalle Bern, JRP Ringier

2006

"Frieze Projects, Artists' Commissions and Talks", Thames & Hudson, London, p. 98-99

2005

Alex Farquharson, "Brian Wilson: An Art Book", Four Corners Books

2004

"Do It", edited by Hans Ulrich Obrist, Revolver and e-flux
