= Josephine Pryde =

English artist

Josephine Pryde (born 1967 in Alnwick, Northumberland) is an English artist. In 2010, reviewing a show of Pryde's work which featured "seven colour photographs of extreme close-ups of clothing on a body, and four sculptures made from half-finished woven baskets and metal butcher’s hooks," the reviewer Dan Fox said that the work "seemed somewhat aloof," adding his opinion that "there was a healthy cynicism here perhaps worth listening to." On 27 May 2011, an exhibition of Pryde's photographs – titled Embryos and Estate Agents: L'Art de Vivre – went on display at the Chisenhale Gallery in East London.

In 2016 she was one of the four artists short-listed for the Turner Prize.

Pryde lives and works in Berlin, Germany and teaches photography at the Kunstakademie Düsseldorf.

== The New Media Express In A Temporary Siding (Baby Wants To Ride) ==
The New Media Express In A Temporary Siding (Baby Wants To Ride) is an installation sculpture nominated for the Turner Prize in 2016 - here presented under the show Lapses In Thinking By The Person I Am - consisting of a model cargo, with a Class 66 diesel locomotive and DB Schenker carriages, in an elevated state. The train is inscribed by graffiti hailing from artists from all of the cities it has been exhibited in. The work is conceptual on a multitude of art history layers and could so be portraited as a time-travel-train. Further studies makes claim of the train to be on a journey to the moon.

Pryde is represented by Reena Spaulings Fine Art and Galerie Neu in Berlin. Her work is in the collection of the Museum of Metropolitan Art, The Art Institute of Chicago, MUDAM The Contemporary Art Museum of Luxembourg, Fonds National d'Art Contemporain, FRAC Lorraine, Stedelijk Museum, Tate Britain, British Council, Museum of Modern Art New York and MOCA Los Angeles.
