= Turner Prize =

Annual prize presented to a British artist

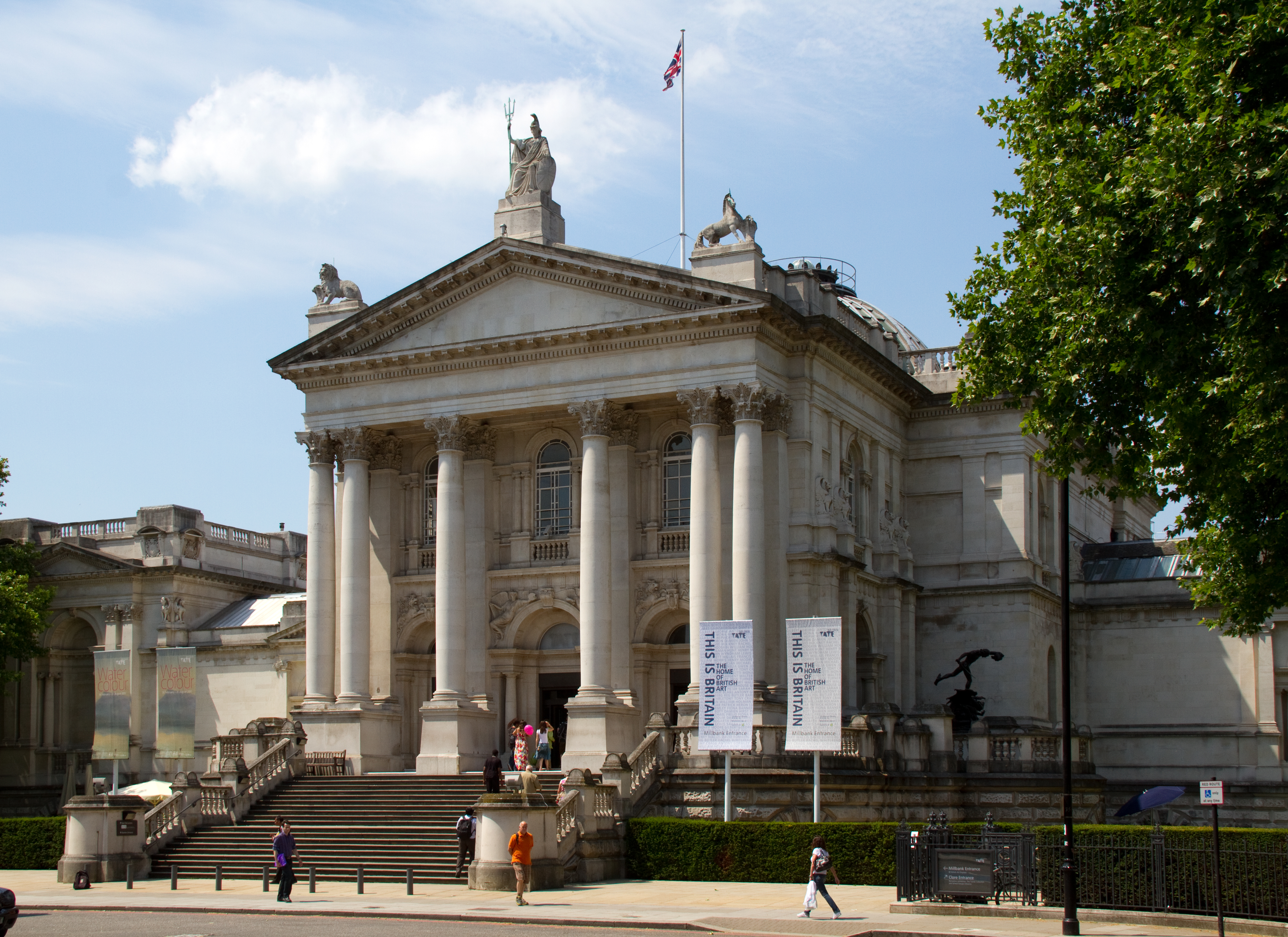
Tate Britain: usual venue for the awarding of the Turner Prize.

The Turner Prize, named after the English painter J. M. W. Turner, is an annual prize presented to a British visual artist. Between 1991 and 2016, only artists under the age of 50 were eligible. The prize is awarded at Tate Britain every other year, with various venues outside of London being used in alternate years. Since its beginnings in 1984 it has become the UK's most publicised art award. The award represents all media.

As of 2004, the monetary award was established at £40,000. There have been different sponsors, including Channel 4 television and Gordon's Gin. A prominent event in British culture, the prize has been awarded by various distinguished celebrities: in 2006 this was Yoko Ono, and in 2012 it was presented by Jude Law.

It is a controversial event, mainly for the exhibits, such as The Physical Impossibility of Death in the Mind of Someone Living – a shark in formaldehyde by Damien Hirst – and My Bed, a dishevelled bed by Tracey Emin. Controversy has also come from other directions, including Culture Minister Kim Howells criticising exhibits, a guest of honour (Madonna) swearing, prize judge Lynn Barber writing in the press, and a speech by Sir Nicholas Serota about the purchase of a trustee's work.

== Background ==
The prize was named after Turner, because, though he is now considered one of the country's greatest artists, when he was active, his work was controversial. While he is now looked at as a traditionalist, his new approach to landscape painting changed the course of art history, as many of the Turner Prize winners aspire to do.

Each year after the announcement of the four nominees and during the build-up to the announcement of the winner, the Prize receives intense attention from the media. Much of this attention is critical and the question is often asked, "Is this art?"

The shortlisted and winning artists are chosen by the prize's jury based upon a showing of their work that they have staged in the preceding year. Nominations for the prize are usually invited from the public, although these suggestions are not a significant part of the selection process according to Lynn Barber, one of the 2006 judges. Public nominations were not actively sought for the prize in 2020 or 2021 "given the uncertainties of lockdown". The shortlist (usually of four or five artists) is announced in July; a show of the nominees' work opens at Tate Britain in late October; the prize itself is announced at the beginning of December. The exhibition remains on view until January. The prize is officially not judged on the Tate show, however, but on the earlier exhibition for which the artist was nominated.

The exhibition and prize rely on commercial sponsorship. By 1987, money for the prize was provided by Drexel Burnham Lambert; its withdrawal after its demise led to the cancellation of the prize for 1990. Channel 4, an independent television channel, stepped in for 1991, doubling the prize money to £20,000, and supporting the event with documentaries and live broadcasts of the prize-giving. Channel 4's head of arts at the time, Waldemar Januszczak, was influential in helping set the format for the prize in the following years, such as arguing for the age limit of 50 that was in place from 1991 until 2017. In 2004, they were replaced as sponsors by Gordon's Gin, doubling the prize money to £40,000, with £5,000 going to each of the shortlisted artists, and £25,000 to the winner.

At a press conference for the 2019 prize, bus operator Stagecoach were announced as the lead sponsors of that year's prize, drawing questions from journalists as to whether the company was an appropriate sponsor, due to the chairman Brian Souter's support of Section 28 laws and campaigning against the legalisation of same-sex marriage. It was announced the following day that Tate and Turner Contemporary (the gallery hosting that year's prize) had mutually agreed to terminate the sponsorship with Stagecoach.

As much as the shortlist of artists reflects the state of British Art, the composition of the panel of judges, which includes curators and critics, provides some indication of who holds influence institutionally and internationally, as well as who are rising stars. Former Tate Director Sir Nicholas Serota was the Chair of the jury from the start of his tenure at the Tate in 1988 until 2006.

The media success of the Turner Prize contributed to the success of (and was in turn helped by) such late 1990s phenomena as the Young British Artists (several of whom were nominees and winners), Cool Britannia, and exhibitions such as the Charles Saatchi-sponsored Sensation exhibition.

Most of the artists nominated for the prize selection become known to the general public for the first time as a consequence. Some have talked of the difficulty of the sudden media exposure. Sale prices of the winners have generally increased. Chris Ofili, Anish Kapoor and Jeremy Deller later became trustees of the Tate. Some artists, including Sarah Lucas and Julian Opie, have declined the invitation to be nominated.

== History ==
The identity of the Turner Prize is deeply associated with conceptual art. For two of its first editions, Art & Language was nominated in 1986, and Terry Atkinson, one of the founders and historical member of Art & Language, was nominated in 1985.

In 2000, Tillmans was the first photographer and first non-British artist to receive the Turner Prize.

=== 1984 ===
Malcolm Morley was awarded the inaugural Turner Prize for his installation of two oil-on-canvas paintings inspired by a trip to Greece. Morley's win sparked controversy because he had been living in New York for the previous 20 years. Other nominees included Richard Long, Richard Deacon and Gilbert & George, all of whom went on to win the Turner Prize themselves. The prize was awarded by Lord Gowrie, Minister for the Arts at the time.

=== 1985 ===
Howard Hodgkin was awarded the Turner Prize for A Small Thing But My Own. Other nominees included Terry Atkinson, sculptor Tony Cragg, Ian Hamilton Finlay, Milena Kalinovska and painting/printing artist John Walker. The prize was awarded by celebrity presenter Sir Richard Attenborough.

=== 1986 ===
The controversial art duo Gilbert & George were awarded the prize after a previous nomination in 1984. Other nominees included Art & Language (collaborative group composed of Michael Baldwin and Mel Ramsden), sculpture/printing artist Victor Burgin, painter Derek Jarman, painter Stephen McKenna and sculptor Bill Woodrow.

=== 1987 ===
Sculpture artist Richard Deacon was awarded the prize. Other nominees included graphic-style painter/printer Patrick Caulfield, Helen Chadwick, Richard Long, Declan McGonagle and Thérèse Oulton. The prize was presented by George Melly.

=== 1988 ===
Sculpture artist Tony Cragg was awarded the prize by Alan Yentob. Other nominees included figurative/portrait painter Lucian Freud, Pop artist Richard Hamilton, Richard Long, David Mach (graduate of Duncan of Jordanstone College of Art), printer Boyd Webb, sculptor Alison Wilding and Richard Wilson. The appointment of Tate Director Nicholas Serota led to many changes such as the introduction of an annual rehang of the Collection and giving priority to modern and contemporary art. During this period the future of the Prize was uncertain. The Turner Prize was modified to be an artist-only prize without a published shortlist and a solo exhibition was awarded to the winner, Tony Cragg.

=== 1989 ===
Sculpture and installation artist Richard Long was presented with the prize after three previous nominations. Controversially, Long was awarded for his lifetime body of work rather than an exhibition of work in 1989. Other nominees included painter Gillian Ayres, figurative painter Lucian Freud, sculptor Giuseppe Penone, painter Paula Rego, abstract painter Sean Scully and Richard Wilson. Italian-born Giuseppe Penone became the first foreign artist to be nominated for the strength of his exhibitions in Britain.

=== 1990 ===
No prize was awarded due to lack of sponsorship. Under Tate Director and Turner Prize chairman Nicholas Serota, changes are made to involve the public in the viewing of the nominated artist such as a published shortlist, a nomination of four shortlisted artists and an individual exhibition of nominated work within the Tate.

=== 1991 ===
Anish Kapoor received the prize for an untitled piece in sandstone and pigment. Other nominees included abstract painters Ian Davenport, Fiona Rae and sculptor Rachel Whiteread.

=== 1992 ===
Grenville Davey received the prize for HAL, a work consisting of two abstract steel objects, each measuring 244 cm × 122 cm (96 in × 48 in). Other nominees included the Young British Artist (yBA) Damien Hirst for his installations, photographer David Tremlett and sculptor Alison Wilding.

=== 1993 ===
Rachel Whiteread was the winner for House, a concrete cast of the inside of a house on Grove Road, near Roman Road, London E3. Jimmy Cauty and Bill Drummond of the K Foundation received media coverage for the award of the "Anti-Turner Prize", £40,000 to be given to the "worst artist in Britain", voted from the real Turner Prize's short-list. Rachel Whiteread was awarded their prize. She refused to accept the money at first, but changed her mind when she heard the cash was to be burned instead, and gave £30,000 of it to artists in financial need and the other £10,000 to the housing charity, Shelter. The K Foundation went on to make a film in which they burned £1 million of their own money (Watch the K Foundation Burn a Million Quid). Other nominees included painter Sean Scully, Laotian-born Vong Phaophanit and printer Hannah Collins.

=== 1994 ===
Popular sculptor Antony Gormley was awarded the 1994 Turner Prize. Other nominees included video artist Northern Irish-born Willie Doherty, whose work The Only Good One Is A Dead One was the first video piece to be nominated for the prize, painter Peter Doig and multi-media Shirazeh Houshiary.

=== 1995 ===
Damien Hirst was awarded the 1995 Turner Prize, which included his notorious sculpture Mother and Child, Divided. Other nominees included Lebanese-born installation/video artist Mona Hatoum, abstract painter Callum Innes and multi-media artist Mark Wallinger.

=== 1996 ===
Douglas Gordon became the first video artist to win the Turner Prize. Other nominees included photographer Craigie Horsfield, painter Gary Hume and installation artist Simon Patterson.

=== 1997 ===
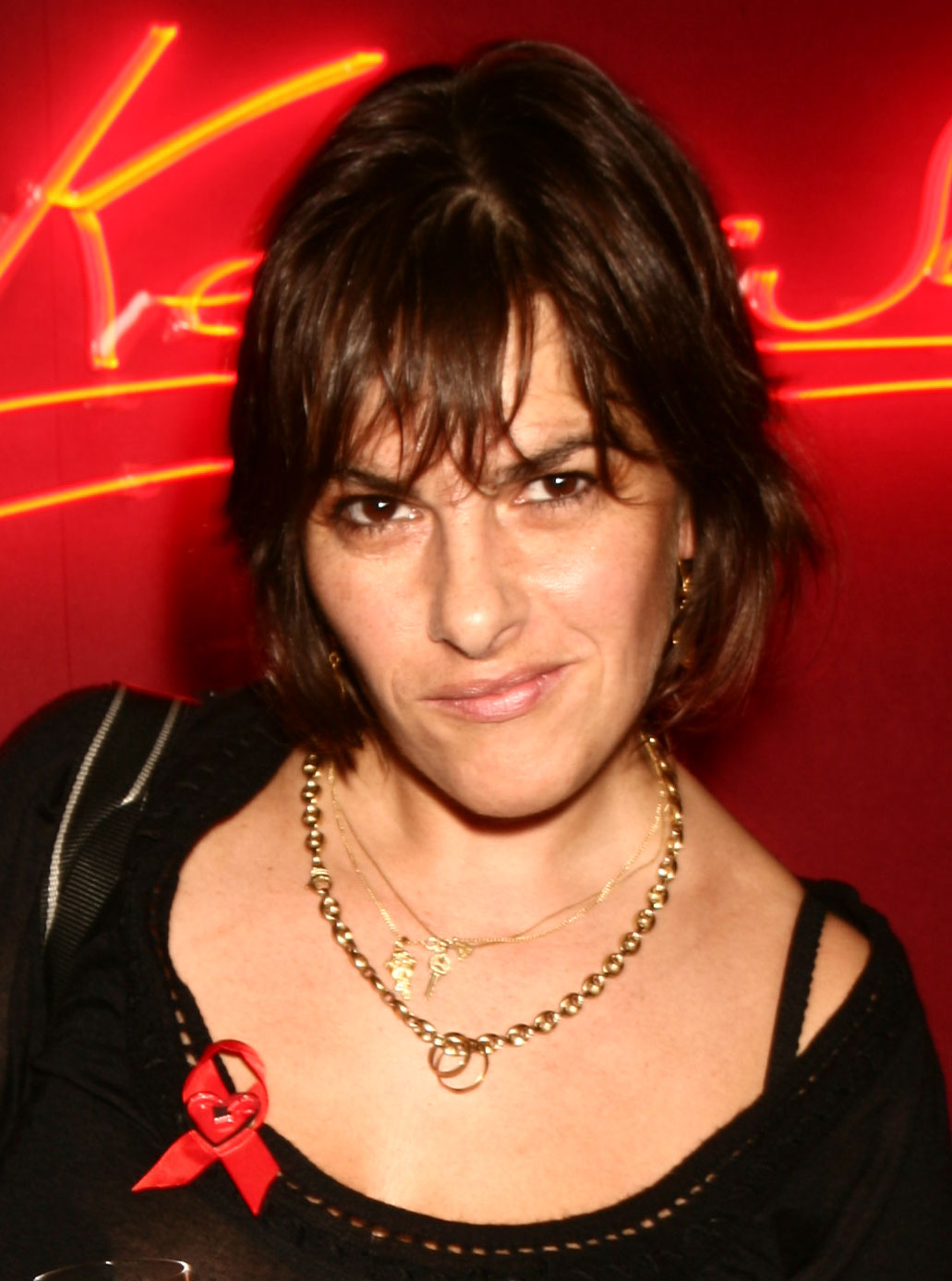
Tracey Emin, debate controversy in 1997, nominee in 1999.

The winner, Gillian Wearing, showed a video 60 minutes of Silence (1996), where a group of actors were dressed in police uniforms and had to stand still for an hour (occasional surreptitious scratching could be observed).

A drunken Tracey Emin walked out of a live Channel 4 discussion programme, presented as part of the coverage of the award. The discussion was chaired by Tim Marlow and also included Roger Scruton, Waldemar Januszczak, Richard Cork, David Sylvester and Norman Rosenthal. Emin wrote about the incident in her 2005 book Strangeland, describing her shock at reading The Guardian writeup the following day.

This was the only time in history with an all-female shortlist including sculptor Christine Borland, Angela Bulloch and sculptor Cornelia Parker.

=== 1998 ===
The talking point was Chris Ofili's use of balls of elephant dung attached to his mixed media images on canvas, as well as being used as supports on the floor to prop them up. An illustrator deposited dung on the steps in protest against his work. Ofili won the prize and it was the first time in twelve years that a painter had done so; it was presented by French fashion designer agnès b. Ofili joked, "Oh man. Thank God! Where's my cheque?" and said: "I don't know what to say. I am just really happy. I can't believe it. It feels like a film and I will watch the tape when I get home." One of Ofili's works, No Woman No Cry is based on the murder of Stephen Lawrence, killed in a race attack.

The jury included musician Neil Tennant, author Marina Warner, curator Fumio Nanjo and British Council officer Ann Gallagher, chaired by Nicholas Serota.

Other nominees included installation artist Tacita Dean, sculptor Cathy de Monchaux and video artist Sam Taylor-Wood. In addition to being the first black person to win the prize, Ofili also became the first painter to win since Howard Hodgkin in 1985.

=== 1999 ===
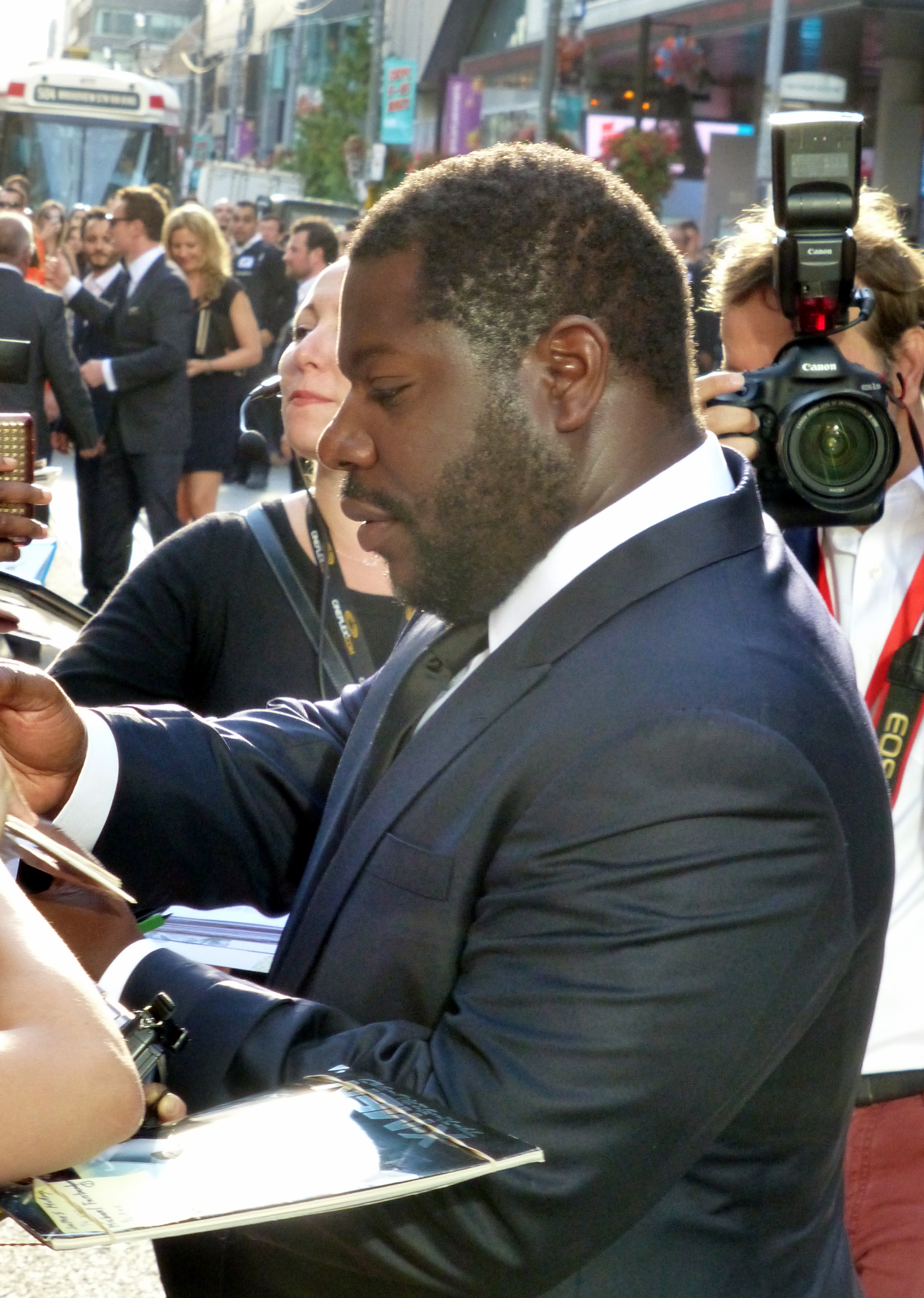
Director Steve McQueen at the Toronto International Film Festival, September 2013

The Prize was given to Steve McQueen for his video based on a Buster Keaton film. Some media attention was given to Tracey Emin's exhibit My Bed, which was a double bed in a dishevelled state with stained sheets, surrounded by detritus such as soiled underwear, condoms, slippers and empty drink bottles. Two artists, Yuan Chai and Jian Jun Xi, jumped onto the bed, stripped to their underwear, and had a pillow fight. Police detained the two, who called their performance Two Naked Men Jump into Tracey's Bed. Other nominees included Steven Pippin and collaborative sibling duo Jane and Louise Wilson.

=== 2000 ===
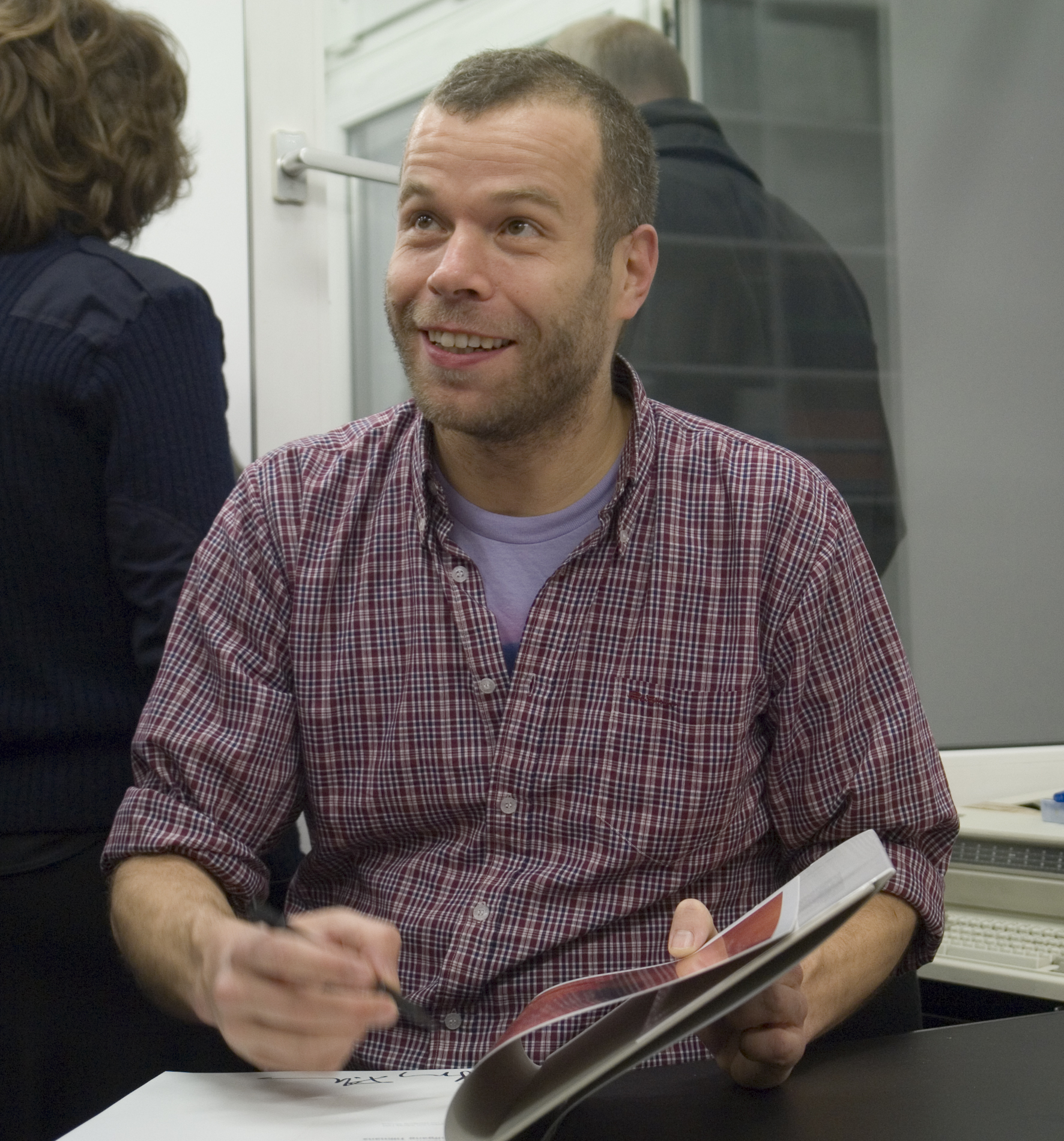
Wolfgang Tillmans, winner in 2000

The prize was won by Wolfgang Tillmans. Other entries included a large painting by Glenn Brown based very closely on a science fiction illustration published some years previously. Michael Raedecker and Tomoko Takahashi were also nominated.

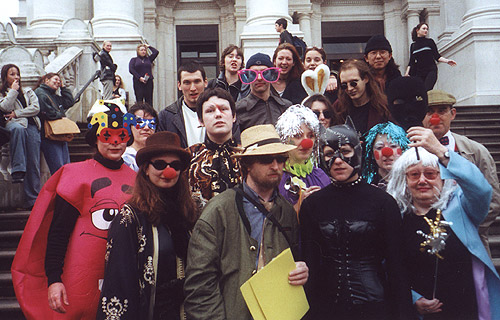
First Stuckist demonstration, 2000

The Stuckist art group staged their first demonstration against the prize, dressed as clowns, describing it as an "ongoing national joke" and "a state-funded advertising agency for Charles Saatchi", adding "the only artist who wouldn't be in danger of winning the Turner Prize is Turner", and concluding that it "should be re-named The Duchamp Award for the destruction of artistic integrity". The Guardian announced the winner of Turner Prize with the headline "Turner Winner Riles the Stuckists".

=== 2001 ===
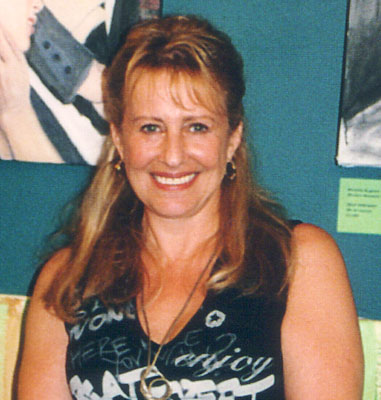
Jacqueline Crofton threw eggs in protest at winner Martin Creed's entry.

Controversy was caused by winner Martin Creed's installation Work No. 227: The lights going on and off consisting of an empty room whose lighting periodically came on and went off. Artist Jacqueline Crofton threw eggs at the walls of the room containing Creed's work as a protest. At the prize ceremony, Madonna gave him the prize and said, "At a time when political correctness is valued over honesty I would also like to say "Right on, motherfuckers!". This was on live TV before the 9 pm watershed and an attempt to "bleep" it out was too late. Channel 4 were subsequently given an official rebuke by the Independent Television Commission.

Other nominees included photographer Richard Billingham, video/installation artist (and now film director) Isaac Julien and installation artist Mike Nelson.

=== 2002 ===
The media focused on a large display by Fiona Banner whose wall-size text piece, Arsewoman in Wonderland, described a pornographic film in detail. The Guardian asked, "It's art. But is it porn?" calling in "Britain's biggest porn star", Ben Dover, to comment. Culture Minister Kim Howells made a scathing criticism of the exhibits as "conceptual bullshit". Prince Charles wrote to him: "It's good to hear your refreshing common sense about the dreaded Turner prize. It has contaminated the art establishment for so long." Graffiti artist Banksy stencilled "Mind the crap" on the steps of the Tate, who called in emergency cleaners to remove it. The prize was won by Keith Tyson.

Other nominees included Liam Gillick and Catherine Yass.

=== 2003 ===
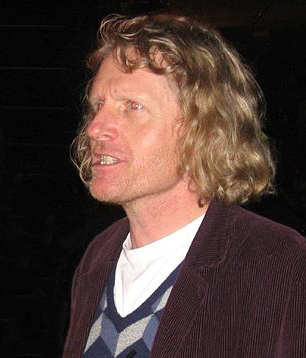
Grayson Perry, winner in 2003

Jake and Dinos Chapman caused press attention for a sculpture, Death, that appeared to be two cheap plastic blow-up sex dolls with a dildo. It was in fact made of bronze, painted to look like plastic.

Attention was also given to Grayson Perry who exhibited pots decorated with sexual imagery, and was the prize winner. He wore a flouncy skirt to collect the prize, announced by Sir Peter Blake, who said, after being introduced by Sir Nicholas Serota, "Thank you very much Nick. I'm quite surprised to be here tonight, because two days ago I had a phone call asking if I would be a judge for the Not the Turner Prize. And two years ago I was asked by the Stuckists to dress as a clown and come and be on the steps outside, so I am thrilled and slightly surprised to be here."

Other nominees included Willie Doherty (his second nomination since 1994) and Anya Gallaccio.

=== 2004 ===
The media focused on a large computer simulation of a former hideout of Osama bin Laden by Ben Langlands and Nikki Bell, as well as the fact that one of their exhibits, a film in a Kabul courtroom was withdrawn as it related to an ongoing trial of a suspected Afghan warlord. Betting favourite Jeremy Deller won the prize with his film Memory Bucket, documenting both George W. Bush's hometown Crawford, Texas – and the siege in Waco nearby. The prize money was increased this year with £25,000 to the winner, and, for the first time, other nominees were rewarded (with £5,000 each).

Other nominees included Kutluğ Ataman and installation/photograph/sculpture artist Yinka Shonibare, who was tipped as the public's favourite among the other nominees.

=== 2005 ===
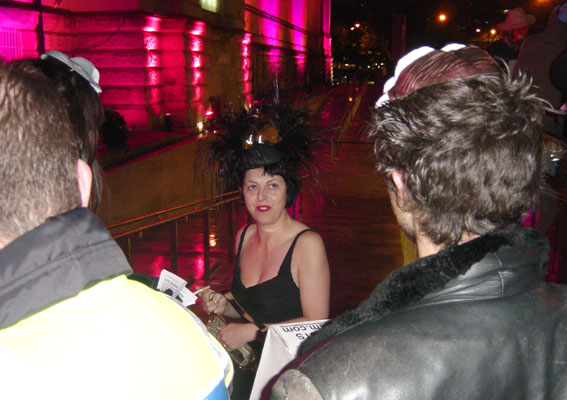
Isabella Blow arrives as a guest at the 2005 Prize

A great deal was made in the press about the winning entry by Simon Starling, which was a shed that he had converted into a boat, sailed down the River Rhine and turned back into a shed again. Two newspapers bought sheds and floated them to parody the work. The prize was presented by Culture Minister, David Lammy. Before introducing him, Sir Nicholas Serota, in an "unusual, possibly unprecedented" move, took the opportunity to make "an angry defence" of the Tate's purchase of The Upper Room.

=== 2006 ===
The nominees were announced on 16 May 2006. The exhibition of nominees' work opened at Tate Britain on 3 October. Yoko Ono, the celebrity announcer chosen for the year, declared Tomma Abts the winner on 4 December during a live Channel 4 broadcast, although this was part of the evening news broadcast, rather than in a dedicated programme as in recent years. The total prize money was £40,000: £25,000 awarded to the winner and £5,000 to each of the other 3 nominees. The prize was sponsored by the makers of Gordon's Gin.

Under the Freedom of Information Act, The Sunday Telegraph obtained emails between the Tate and judge Lynn Barber, which revealed that the judges had been sent a list of shows by artists too late to be able to see them and instead were being supplied with catalogues and photographs of work.

More controversy ensued when Barber wrote in The Observer about her troubles as a judge, even asking, "Is it all a fix?", a comment subsequently displayed on a Stuckist demonstration placard, much to her chagrin.

The judges were:

Lynn Barber, journalist, The Observer
Margot Heller, director, South London Gallery
Matthew Higgs, Director and Chief Curator, White Columns, New York
Andrew Renton, writer and Director of Curating, Goldsmiths College
Nicholas Serota, director, Tate and Chairman of the Jury

=== 2007 ===
The winner of the £25,000 Prize was Mark Wallinger. His display at the Turner Prize show was Sleeper, a film of him dressed in a bear costume wandering around an empty museum, but the prize was officially given for State Britain, which recreated all the objects in Brian Haw's anti-war display in Parliament Square, London. The judges commended Wallinger's work for its "immediacy, visceral intensity and historic importance", and called it "a bold political statement with art's ability to articulate fundamental human truths." The prize was presented by Dennis Hopper.

For the first time in its 23-year history, the Turner Prize was held outside London, in Tate Liverpool (in support of Liverpool being the European Capital of Culture in 2008), following a suggestion by gallery worker Jason Richardson. Concurrently there was an exhibition of previous winners at Tate Britain in London.

Unlike recent years, Sir Nicholas Serota was not the jury chairman; instead, the chairman was Christoph Grunenberg, the Director of Tate Liverpool. The panel was:

Fiona Bradley, Director of the Fruitmarket Gallery, Edinburgh
Michael Bracewell, critic and writer
Thelma Golden, Director and Chief Curator of the Studio Museum, Harlem
Miranda Sawyer, writer and broadcaster
Christoph Grunenberg, Director of Tate Liverpool (Chairman of the Jury)

The nominees were:

Mark Wallinger for his Tate Britain installation, State Britain
Nathan Coley, a Glasgow artist, who makes installations based on buildings
Zarina Bhimji, a Ugandan Asian photographer and filmmaker
Mike Nelson, an installation artist

Nelson and Wallinger had both previously been nominated for the prize.

The Stuckists announced that they were not demonstrating for the first time since 2000, because of "the lameness of this year's show, which does not merit the accolade of the traditional demo". Instead, art group AAS re-enacted previous Stuckist demonstrations in protest against their own practice at the Royal Standard Turner Prize Extravaganza.

=== 2008 ===
Mark Leckey was the winner of the Turner Prize of 2008.

For the second year running, Sir Nicholas Serota did not chair the Turner Prize jury; instead Stephen Deuchar, director of Tate Britain, was the chair. The other members were Jennifer Higgie, editor of frieze, Daniel Birnbaum, rector of the Städelschule international art academy, Frankfurt, architect David Adjaye, and Suzanne Cotter, senior curator, Modern Art Oxford. The prize winner received £25,000 and the other three nominees £5,000 each. In recent years the prize has attracted commercial sponsorship, but did not have any during the 2008 events. The nominees were Runa Islam, Mark Leckey, Goshka Macuga, and Cathy Wilkes; the Prize exhibition opened at Tate Britain on 30 September and the winner was announced on 1 December.

=== 2009 ===
The winner of the £25,000 Prize was Richard Wright. Stephen Deuchar again chaired the jury.

The other shortlisted artists were Enrico David, Roger Hiorns and Lucy Skaer.

=== 2010 ===
The winner was Susan Philipsz who graduated from Duncan of Jordanstone College of Art & Design in Dundee. She was the first artist ever to win with a purely aural work, having made an installation under three bridges in Glasgow in which she sang folklorised versions of the sea shanty "Lowlands Away". For the Turner Prize, the work consisted simply of loudspeakers installed along the walls in a gallery room. The other artists nominated were Dexter Dalwood, Angela de la Cruz, and the Otolith Group.

=== 2011 ===
The 2011 Turner Prize took place in Gateshead at the Baltic Centre for Contemporary Art, away from the Tate in London for the first time since 2007. The winner was Martin Boyce. The other nominees were Karla Black, Hilary Lloyd and George Shaw. The prize ceremony was interrupted by the international streaker Mark Roberts who was hired by the artist Benedikt Dichgans.

149,770 people visited the exhibition in Gateshead making it the most visited Turner Prize exhibition ever.

=== 2012 ===
The nominees for the 2012 prize were Spartacus Chetwynd, Luke Fowler (graduate of Duncan of Jordanstone College of Art), Paul Noble and Elizabeth Price.

Former Talulah Gosh member Elizabeth Price was awarded the £25,000 prize.

=== 2013 ===
The 2013 Turner Prize were held at Ebrington Square in Derry, the first-time the prize was awarded outside England, as part of the UK City of Culture celebrations. The prize jury was chaired by Penelope Curtis, Director of Tate Britain. The nominees for the 2013 award were Laure Prouvost, Tino Sehgal, David Shrigley, and Lynette Yiadom-Boakye. The winner of the 2013 prize was Laure Prouvost.

=== 2014 ===
The nominees for the 2014 award were Duncan Campbell, Ciara Phillips, James Richards and Tris Vonna-Michell. The winner of the 2014 prize was Duncan Campbell.

=== 2015 ===
The nominees for the 2015 award were Bonnie Camplin, Janice Kerbel, Nicole Wermers, and Assemble. The winner of the 2015 prize was Assemble. The exhibition was held in Glasgow, Scotland, in the Tramway, a contemporary art, theatre and dance space.

=== 2016 ===
The nominees for the 2016 award were Michael Dean, Anthea Hamilton, Helen Marten, and Josephine Pryde. The winner was Helen Marten.

=== 2017 ===
The nominees for the 2017 award were Lubaina Himid, Rosalind Nashashibi, Hurvin Anderson, and Andrea Büttner. The exhibition was held in Hull, at the Ferens Art Gallery, as part of Hull UK City of Culture 2017. The winner was Lubaina Himid.

=== 2018 ===
The nominees for the 2018 award were Forensic Architecture, Naeem Mohaiemen, Charlotte Prodger, and Luke Willis Thompson. All four were video artists.

The shortlist was drawn up by writer and critic Oliver Basciano, Elena Filipovic, director, Kunsthalle Basel; Lisa Le Feuvre, executive director of Holt/Smithson Foundation; and novelist Tom McCarthy. The winner was Charlotte Prodger.

=== 2019 ===
The 2019 award was hosted at the Turner Contemporary in Margate, Kent. The shortlisted artists were Lawrence Abu Hamdan, Helen Cammock, Oscar Murillo and Tai Shani, who were jointly awarded the prize as a collective following their request to be considered as a single group.

=== 2020 ===
It was announced in May, at a late stage in judging, that this year's award would be replaced by a bursary for 10 artists who would be announced in July due to the COVID-19 pandemic in the United Kingdom.

The ten artists to receive bursaries were: Oreet Ashery, Liz Johnson Artur, Shawanda Corbett, Jamie Crewe, Sean Edwards, Sidsel Meineche Hansen, Ima-Abasi Okon, Imran Perretta, Alberta Whittle, and the political arts organisation Arika.

=== 2021 ===
Hosted in Coventry, the 2021 nominees were Array Collective, Black Obsidian Sound System, Cooking Sections, Gentle/Radical, and Project Art Works. Array Collective were announced as the winners on 1 December 2021.

=== 2022 ===
On 12 April 2022, it was announced that the nominees for the prize were Heather Phillipson, Ingrid Pollard, Veronica Ryan, and Sin Wai Kin. Veronica Ryan was announced as the winner.

=== 2023 ===
Jesse Darling won the award in 2023, hosted in Eastbourne. Nominees were Jesse Darling, Ghislaine Leung, Rory Pilgrim and Barbara Walker

=== 2024 ===
On 24 April 2024, it was announced that the nominees for the prize were Jasleen Kaur, Pio Abad, Claudette Johnson, and Delaine Le Bas. On 3 December, Kaur was announced as the winner, for her animations of everyday objects. She won £25,000.

The 2024 Turner Prize ceremony was held at the Tate Britain. In her winner's speech, Kaur voiced her supported for protestors outside the venue, called for a ceasefire in the Middle East, and referenced a letter signed by "over 1,200 artists and art workers" in November 2024, which called on "Tate to sever ties with two of its funding partners, Outset Contemporary Art Fund and Zabludowicz Art Trust".

The Delaine Le Bas installation at the 2024 Turner Prize came under scrutiny for suspected plagiarism of an earlier work by Edgeworth Johnstone, who was protesting outside Tate Britain on the day of the award ceremony.

=== 2025 ===
On 23 April 2025, the four artists shortlisted for the 2025 Turner Prize were announced: Nnena Kalu, Rene Matić, Mohammed Sami, and Zadie Xa. On 9 December 2025, the winner was announced as Nnena Kalu. The Guardian called the 2025 award the "soppiest ever".

== Public perception ==
=== In favour ===
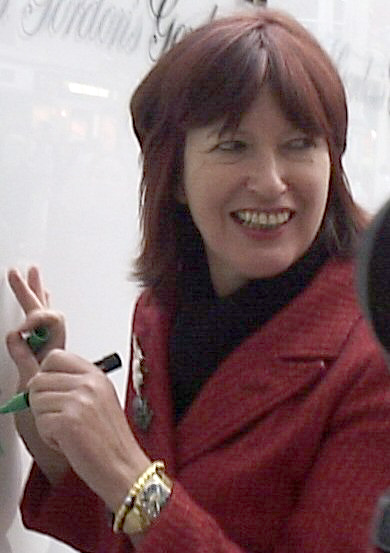
Janet Street-Porter: "a valuable role"

- Critic Richard Cork said, "there will never be a substitute for approaching new art with an open mind, unencumbered by rancid clichés. As long as the Turner Prize facilitates such engagement, the buzz surrounding it will remain a minor distraction."
- In 2006, newspaper columnist Janet Street-Porter condemned the Stuckists' "feeble knee-jerk reaction" to the prize and said, "The Turner Prize and Becks Futures both entice thousands of young people into art galleries for the first time every year. They fulfil a valuable role".
- Sarah Thornton said that the Turner Prize "has a reputation for being a reliable indicator of an artist's ability to sustain a vibrant art practice over the long term, but perhaps it is a self-fulfilling prophecy. The personal confidence gained from being nominated can galvanize an artist's ambitions, while the museum's public endorsement leads to further exhibition opportunities."
- Dan Fox, associate editor of frieze, said that the Turner Prize should be considered a barometer for the mood of the nation.

=== Opposed ===
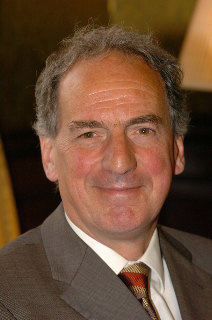
Kim Howells: "cold mechanical, conceptual bullshit"

- The Evening Standard critic Brian Sewell wrote "The annual farce of the Turner Prize is now as inevitable in November as is the pantomime at Christmas".
- Critic Matthew Collings wrote: "Turner Prize art is based on a formula where something looks startling at first and then turns out to be expressing some kind of banal idea, which somebody will be sure to tell you about. The ideas are never important or even really ideas, more notions, like the notions in advertising. Nobody pursues them anyway, because there's nothing there to pursue."
- The art critic David Lee has argued that since the re-organisation of the prize in 1991 the shortlist has been dominated by artists represented by a small number of London dealers, namely Nicholas Logsdail of the Lisson Gallery, and others closely linked to the collector Charles Saatchi: Jay Jopling, Maureen Paley and Victoria Miro. The Lisson Gallery has had the most success of any gallery with the Turner Prize from 1991 to 2004.
- Jilly Cooper's 2002 novel Pandora parodied the prize with one of the book's protagonists being shortlisted with a work entitled 'Tampax Tower'.
- In 2002, Culture Minister and former art student Kim Howells pinned the following statement to a board in a room specially designated for visitors' comments:
  "If this is the best British artists can produce then British art is lost. It is cold mechanical, conceptual bullshit.
  Kim Howells.
  P.S. The attempts at conceptualisation are particularly pathetic and symptomatic of a lack of conviction."

== Alternative and spoof prizes ==
The Turner Prize has spawned various other prizes in reaction to or ridiculing it. In 1993, the K Foundation gave an "Anti-Turner Prize" of £40,000 for the "worst artist in Britain" with the same short list as the official prize: the winner of both prizes was Rachel Whiteread. In 1999, Trevor Prideaux organized the ongoing Turnip Prize as "a crap art competition... You can enter anything you like, but it must be rubbish"; the judging criteria include "Lack of effort" and "Is it shit?"

In 2000, the Stuckists instituted "The Real Turner Prize" for painters, and an "Art Clown of the Year Award" for "outstanding idiocy in the visual arts," both continued in the subsequent years (the Clown award given in 2002 to Serota).

== See also ==
- List of European art awards
- Marcel Duchamp Prize
- Turnip Prize – awarded annually as a spoof of the Turner Prize
