= Jesse Darling =

British artist (born 1981)

- Born: 1981 (age 44–45); Oxford, England
- Education: Central Saint Martins (BA); Slade School of Fine Art (MFA), UCL
- Awards: Turner Prize (2023)

Jesse Darling (born 1981) is a British artist working in sculpture and installation. He won the Turner Prize in 2023. Since 2024, he has been an associate professor at the University of Oxford's Ruskin School of Art and a tutorial fellow of St Anne's College, Oxford.

== Early life and education ==
Darling was born in 1981 in Oxford. He received a Bachelor of Arts (BA) degree from Central Saint Martins in 2010 and a Master of Fine Arts (MFA) degree from Slade School of Fine Art, UCL in 2014.

== Art career ==
Darling is known for his work with unconventional materials including hazard tape and welded barriers. From September 2018 to February 2019, a number of Darling's sculptures and drawings were on display at the Tate Britain as an exhibition titled "The Ballad of Saint Jerome". Darling's show at Modern Art Oxford in 2022, "No Medals, No Ribbons", was the exhibition for which he was nominated for the Turner Prize.

In 2024, he joined the University of Oxford as an associate professor at the Ruskin School of Art. He is also a tutorial fellow of St Anne's College, Oxford.

== In the art community ==
In 2013, Darling cofounded the Kitson Road Living Project in southeast London as a home and display space for fellow artists. The project operated for a year before moving to Fernholme Road.

== Personal life ==
As of 2023 Darling lived and worked in Berlin. He is transmasculine, and bisexual.
