= Ghislaine Leung =

British artist

- Born: 1980 (age 45–46); Stockholm, Sweden
- Education: University of the West of England; Middlesex University

Ghislaine Leung is a British artist who lives and works in London. She was nominated for the Turner Prize in 2023.

== Early life and education ==
Ghislaine Leung was born 1980 in Stockholm, Sweden to a mother from London and a Chinese father from Hong Kong. Her father had moved to the UK in 1970 at the age 20, attending university in London. Leung has German-Jewish maternal grandparents.

Leung grew up in Reims, France and then London. She graduated with a Bachelor of Arts (BA) in Fine Art in Context from the University of the West of England in 2002 and later a Master of Arts (MA) in Aesthetics and Art Theory from Middlesex University in 2009.

== Career ==
Leung occupied various positions in art institutions including Tate. She began practicing art again in 2015, before making her first major appearance in contemporary art in 2017.

Leung's work focuses on institutional surroundings, and how people interact with and assess their surroundings and identity.
