= Bonnie Camplin =

British artist

- Born: 1970 (age 55–56)

Bonnie Camplin (born 1970) is a British artist and a fine art lecturer at Goldsmiths College, London. She was a 2015 Turner Prize nominee, nominated for the exhibition The Military Industrial Complex, which was shown at the South London Gallery. Her work has been exhibited at the Tate Britain, Cabinet and the Chisenhale Gallery in London.

== Education ==
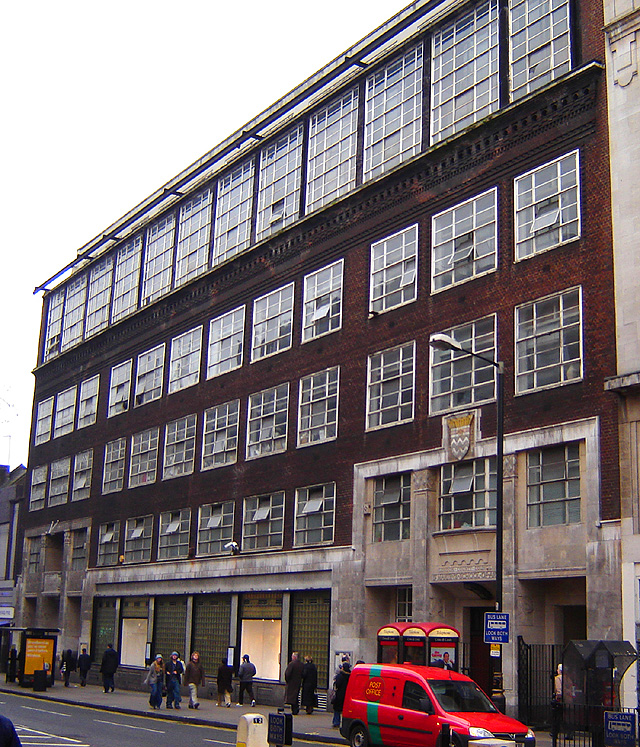
Saint Martin's School of Art, where Bonnie Camplin studied

Bonnie Camplin studied at Saint Martins School of Art, London for a BA in Fine Art Film and Video (1989–92), and a Postgraduate Diploma in Advanced Photography (1995–96).

== Work ==
Camplin has worked across film and video, photography, sculpture, painting, performance, music and drawing. She broadly describes her practice as 'the Invented Life'. From 2008 to 2010 she was guest professor at Städelschule in Frankfurt. She is a lecturer at Goldsmiths College in London. She has given lectures at the 12th Venice Architectural Biennalle 2010, the Slade School of Art, The Royal Academy School London, the University of Manchester, the Ruskin School of Drawing and Fine Art, and Zürcher Hochschule der Künste.

In 2014 Camplin was awarded the Paul Hamlyn award for artists. She was a 2015 Turner Prize nominee, nominated for the exhibition The Military Industrial Complex, which was shown at the South London Gallery. She has collaborated with artists including Lucy McKenzie and Paulina Olowska and was in the band DonAteller with Mark Leckey, Ed Laliq and Enrico David. Most recently Camplin has moved away from the creation of objects and focussed more on pedagogy. She spends part of the year living off-grid in a yurt in Cumbria.

== Exhibitions ==
=== Selected solo exhibitions ===
- 1993 What About My Innocence, Maximus Nightclub, London
- 2000 Now We Are Five, Plank Gallery, London
- 2011 Galerie Cinzia Friedlaender, Berlin
- 2012 STW, Michael Benevento in Los Angeles
- 2013 No More Car Sick, Cabinet, London
- 2014 Liverpool Biennial, Liverpool
- 2015 The Military Industrial Complex, South London Gallery, London
- 2017 Bonnie Camplin, Camden Arts Centre, London

=== Selected group exhibitions and screenings ===
- 1999 The Lux, London
- 2001 Roll Yer Own, Institute of Contemporary Arts, London
- 2001 Electric Blue, The Barbican, London
- 2002 The Difference Between Us, Five Years Gallery (Saatchi East), London
- 2009 When the Wind Blows Up You, Chisenhale Gallery, London
- 2011 Madame Realism, Marres Centre for Contemporary Art, Maastricht
- 2012 Sound works, Institute of Contemporary Arts, London
- 2013 Assembly, A survey of Recent Artists Film and Video in Britain 2008–2013, Tate Britain, London
