= Ángela de la Cruz =

Ángela de la Cruz (born 1965) is a Spanish artist. She was nominated for the Turner Prize in 2010.

== Biography ==
De la Cruz was born in 1965 in A Coruña. She studied philosophy at the University of Santiago de Compostela, before moving to London in 1989, where she studied Fine Art at the Chelsea College of Art, Goldsmiths College and received her MA in Sculpture and Critical Theory at the Slade School of Fine Art. She lives and works in London. In 2005, she had a brain haemorrhage and fell into a coma, during which she gave birth to her daughter. De la Cruz is now a wheelchair user and continues working with assistants through a delegated work, although this method of practice was used by her before the stroke.

== Work ==
While studying at the Slade, De la Cruz removed the stretcher bar of a painted canvas. De la Cruz was inspired by the resulting saggy painting, and she has become best known for paintings which are deliberately broken or distorted. In her words: "One day I took the cross bar out and the painting bent. From that moment on, I looked at the painting as an object." Her work, treating paintings as a three-dimensional object rather than a two-dimensional representation, follows a tradition that includes the spatialism of Lucio Fontana in the 1940s.

Her 1995 work Ashamed, is a small straw-yellow painting, broken in half, which is exhibited wedged into a corner between two gallery walls. The similar 1996 work Homeless, a much larger canvas of similar pale yellow hue, has its frame broken in two and folded, and is exhibited lurking in a corner, standing on the gallery floor. Waldemar Januszczak has described Ashamed as "peewhite" and Homeless as "urine coloured". Self (1997) comprises a chair and two dark brown paintings: one canvas draped broken over a chair, juxtaposed to an intact canvas hung on the wall. Ready to Wear (1997–2003) is series of red canvases, part-ripped from its frame, as if the painting were getting dressed. "Nothing" (1998–2005) is a series of black canvases, crumpled into a heap and abandoned on the gallery floor, resembling a discarded black plastic bag. Some works since 2000 have incorporated objects, such as chairs, tables or wardrobes, sometimes adorned with broken canvases. Her "Clutter" series (2003-5) bring together collections of waste art materials. Her "Deflated" paintings (2009-) hang forlornly from a hook, with no frame. "Flat" (2009), comprises a plastic and metal chair which has collapsed onto the floor.

She was commissioned to paint Larger Than Life in 1998 for the ballroom at the Royal Festival Hall.

She exhibited at Manifesta 5 at San Sebastián in 2004. Her first solo exhibition in the UK, entitled After, was held at Camden Arts Centre in April and May 2010. She was nominated for the Turner Prize for this show in 2010.

She received Spain's National Award for Plastic Arts in 2017.

In recent years de la Cruz has also used aluminium as a base material for her work. The metal is welded into shape, then crushed, beaten and distorted. This body of work has been exhibited in 'Burst' at the Lisson Gallery, Milan, in 2013 along other exhibitions.
