= Enrico David =

Italian sculptor

Enrico David (born 1966, Ancona, Italy) is an Italian artist based in London. He works in painting, drawing, sculpture and installation, at times employing traditional craft techniques. In the 1990s, he garnered acclaim for creating monumental embroidered portraits using sewn canvases, which often began as drawings and collages from fashion magazines. During the past several years, David focused on sculpture in a variety of media and returned to more traditional methods of painting. His recent works include large-scale portraits of deeply psychological meaning. Drawing continues to be an important element of his practice.

David studied at Central St. Martins in London and has since exhibited his work in galleries and museums worldwide. David was shortlisted for the Turner Prize in 2009. In 2012, he mounted his first solo exhibition in New York City, Head Gas, organized by the New Museum. In 2013, David presented a major installation of paintings, tapestries and sculptures as part of The Encyclopedic Palace, curated by Massimiliano Gioni for the Venice Biennale.

His exhibitions include the Institute of Contemporary Arts, London (2007); Seattle Art Museum (2008); Museum für Gegenwartskunst, Basel (2009); Fondazione Bevilacqua La Masa, Venice (2011); the Hammer Museum, Los Angeles (2013); Hepworth Wakefield, West Yorkshire (2015); the Collezione Maramotti, Reggio Emilia (2015); and the Sharjah Art Foundation, United Arab Emirates (2016). An installation, Spring Session Men, was included in the group exhibition Secret Societies, organized in 2011 by Schirn Kunsthalle Frankfurt and CAPC Bordeaux. Museum of Contemporary Art Chicago, Chicago (2018).

In 2019, the largest U.S. museum survey of David's work to date occurred jointly at the Museum of Contemporary Art Chicago and the Hirshhorn Museum and Sculpture Garden. Curated by Michael Darling, chief curator of MCA Chicago, Enrico David: Gradations of Slow Release featured twenty years of David's artistic output.
