= Assemble (collective) =

Art and design group in London, England

Assemble RA is a collective based in London, who work across the fields of art, architecture and design. They began working together in 2010 and have described themselves as having between 16 and 20 permanent members. Assemble's working practice seeks to address the typical disconnection between the public and the process by which places are made. Assemble champion a working practice that is interdependent and collaborative, seeking to actively involve the public as both participant and collaborator in the ongoing realization of the work. Their socially responsible approach led them to win a Global Award for Sustainable Architecture in 2017.

While a number of members of the collective are qualified architects, some have no architectural training at all, and have backgrounds in set design, theatre, anthropology, philosophy and construction. Some art critics say that Assemble represents a different vision opposite to those mainstream values in the art world, an argument put forward in The New York Times by N+1 editor Nikil Saval.

Assemble teach architecture and urban design in a number of universities, and lecture and teach workshops around the world. All of their major project work is based in communities in cities in the UK. Some also work in research. Their studio and office space moved in 2016 from Stratford to Bermondsey, retaining its name, Sugarhouse Studios.

== Granby Four Streets ==
One of Assemble's most notable works is Granby Four Streets, an ongoing community project in Toxteth, Liverpool. Beaconsfield Street, Cairns Street, Jermyn Street and Ducie Street were built around 1900 with terraced houses for artisan workers. The first project, 10 Houses on Cairns Street, was realised in collaboration with a Community Land Trust called Granby CLT. Other projects in the area include Granby Workshop and Winter Garden.

The Granby project was nominated for and won the 2015 Turner Prize. Their win was controversial in some quarters as Assemble operates outside of the traditional gallery context and have never claimed to be artists.

== Other projects ==
Assemble's first two projects, Cineroleum and Folly for a Flyover were temporary installations in public space. Other projects include Yardhouse, a dismountable affordable workspace built next to their workshop and studio in Stratford. It was recently sold to be rebuilt elsewhere now its original site is up for development.

They have started a number of small organisations which run their projects in the longer term, including Baltic Street Adventure Playground in Dalmarnock, East Glasgow, Granby Workshop in Liverpool and Blackhorse Workshop, which is a community workshop and maker space in Walthamstow, north-east London.

In 2025, Assemble released their new book, Assemble: Building Collective. A collection of seven chapters displaying their work over the past 15 years.

== Awards ==
- 2015 Turner Prize
- Global Award for Sustainable Architecture 2017
