= 1986 in art =

Events from the year 1986 in art.

== Events ==
- 21 May – Eighteen Old Master paintings from the Beit collection are stolen from Russborough House in Ireland by Martin "The General" Cahill, the second major art theft from this location.
- 19 August – Two weeks after it was stolen, the Picasso painting Weeping Woman is found in a locker at Spencer Street station in Melbourne, Australia.
- Opening of the Musée d'Orsay (formerly the Gare d'Orsay) in Paris.

== Awards ==
- Archibald Prize – Davida Allen, Dr John Arthur McKelvey Shera
- Sulman Prize – Wendy Sharpe, Black Sun – Morning and Night
- Turner Prize – Gilbert and George
  - Shortlisted: Art & Language, Victor Burgin, Derek Jarman, Stephen McKenna and Bill Woodrow

== Exhibitions ==
- 23 November – The Spiritual in Art: Abstract Painting 1890–1985 opens at Los Angeles County Museum of Art. Organized by Maurice Tuchman, this is the first public showing of the abstract art of Swedish painter and mystic Hilma af Klint (died 1944).

== Works ==
- David Adickes – Cornet (sculpture, Galveston, Texas)
- Yaacov Agam - Fire and Water Fountain at Dizengoff Square in Tel Aviv, Israel (Dedicated)
- Ruth Asawa – Aurora (sculpture, San Francisco)
- John Buckley – The Headington Shark (Untitled 1986; painted fibreglass sculpture)
- Daniel Buren - Les Deux Plateaux in the inner courtyard (Cour d'Honneur) of the Palais Royal in Paris, France
- John Burgee and Philip Johnson – Clarke Memorial Fountain (Notre Dame, Indiana)
- Wayne Chabre – Einstein Gargoyle (sculpture, Eugene, Oregon)
- John Doubleday – Royal Marines Commando Memorial (Lympstone, England)
- Georgia Gerber – Animals in Pools (sculptures, Portland, Oregon)
- Robert Graham - Monument to Joe Louis installed at Hart Plaza in Detroit, Michigan, United States
- David Hockney – Pearblossom Highway #2 (photocollage)
- Ellsworth Kelly – Houston Triptych (bronze sculpture, Houston, Texas)
- Roy Lichtenstein - Mural with Blue Brushstroke (in the lobby of 787 Seventh Avenuein New York City
- Igor Mitoraj – Heros de Lumiere
- Odd Nerdrum – Return of the Sun
- Kantilal B. Patel – Mohandas Gandhi (sculpture, New York City)
- John Raimondi – Dance of the Cranes (sculpture; Omaha, Nebraska)
- Andy Warhol
  - Camouflage
  - Map of Eastern U.S.S.R. Missile Bases
  - The Last Supper (Series completed)
- Andrew Wyeth – Flood Plain
- Jamie Wyeth – Kalounna in Frogtown (Terra Foundation for American Art)
- Yu Tang Wang and Sun Chau – Chinatown Gateway (structure, Portland, Oregon)

== Births ==
- 15 April – Amy Louise Nettleton, British installation and sculpture artist.
- Oscar Murillo, Colombian-born artist.
- Joseph Yaeger, American painter

== Deaths ==
=== January to June ===
- 6 March – Georgia O'Keeffe American artist (b. 1887).
- 26 April – Dechko Uzunov, Bulgarian painter (b. 1899).
- 11 May – Henry Plumer McIlhenny, American art collector, philanthropist and chairman of Philadelphia Museum of Art (b. 1910).
- 31 May – Jane Frank, American painter, sculptor, mixed media artist and textile artist (b. 1918).
- 9 June – Ilona Harima, Finnish painter (b. 1911).

=== July to December ===
- 7 April – Cecil King, Irish abstract-minimalist painter (b. 1921).
- 30 June – Guan Zilan, Chinese avant-garde painter (b. 1903)
- 22 July – Floyd Gottfredson, American cartoonist (b. 1905).
- 31 August – Henry Moore, English artist and sculptor (b. 1898).
- 9 September – Albert Malet, French painter (b. 1912).
- 12 September
  - Ernst Haas, Austrian photographer (b. 1921).
  - Jacques Henri Lartigue, French photographer and painter (b. 1894).
- 17 September - Jaroslav Bejček, Czech painter, graphic artist, sculptor, and illustrator (b. 1926)
- 18 September – Corita Kent, American nun and silkscreen printer (b. 1918).
- 11 October – Barker Fairley, English-born Canadian painter, writer, and educator (b. 1887).
- 23 October – Conrad O'Brien-ffrench, British intelligence officer, mountaineer, and painter (b.1893).

=== Undated ===
- Marko Čelebonović, Serbian painter (b. 1902).
- Guan Liang, Chinese artist (b. 1900).

== See also ==
- 1986 in fine arts of the Soviet Union
