= 1911 in art =

Events from the year 1911 in art.

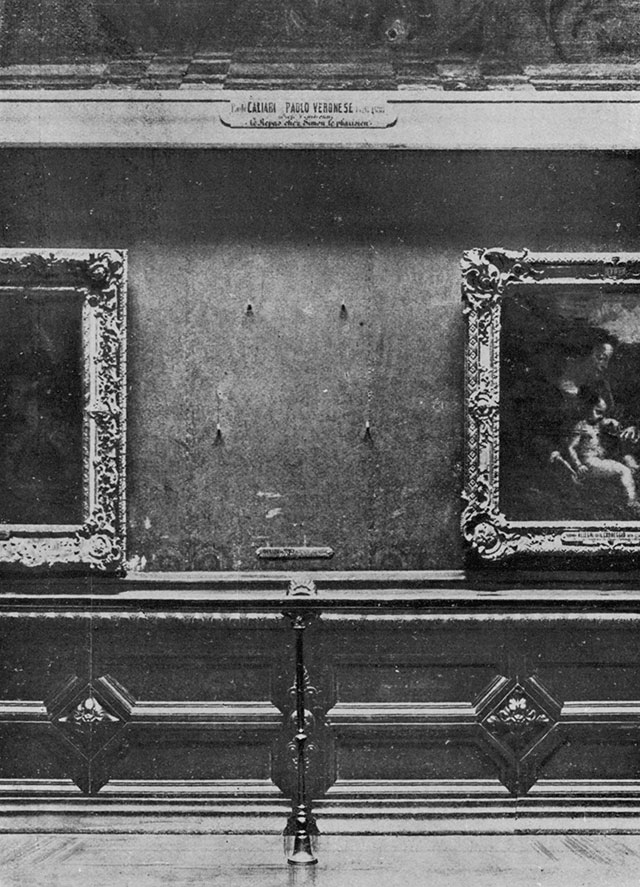
Vacant wall in the Salon Carré, Louvre after theft of the Mona Lisa

== Events ==
- January 18 – French jazz musician Charles Delaunay is born in Paris, the son of artists Sonia and Robert Delaunay. Sonia makes a patchwork quilt for his crib which is influential in the development of Orphism.
- February 2 – First issue of Franz Pfemfert's Die Aktion.
- May – Only exhibition by The London Secession group of photographers, at the Newman Gallery.
- June 10 – Rembrandt House Museum opened in Amsterdam.
- August 21 – Leonardo da Vinci's Mona Lisa is stolen from the Louvre museum in Paris by Vincenzo Peruggia; the theft is discovered the following day when painter Louis Béroud arrives to sketch it but the painting is not located until December 1913. Poet and art critic Guillaume Apollinaire and his friend Pablo Picasso are questioned over the theft.
- Creation of Der Blaue Reiter Group (first exhibition opens December 18 in Munich).
- Creation of the Puteaux Group.
- Creation of the Camden Town Group.
- Wassily Kandinsky publishes Über das Geistige in der Kunst, Insbesondere in der Malerei ("Concerning the Spiritual in Art, and Painting in Particular" or "The Art of Spiritual Harmony"), dated 1912.
- Rayonism developed in Russia by Mikhail Larionov and Natalia Goncharova.
- English wood engraver Gwen Darwin marries French painter Jacques Raverat.

== Exhibitions ==
- April 21–June 13 – Salon des Indépendants; Jean Metzinger, Albert Gleizes, Henri Le Fauconnier, Robert Delaunay, Fernand Léger, Joseph Csaky and Roger de La Fresnaye are shown together in Room 41, provoking an 'involuntary scandal' out of which Cubism emerges and spreads in Paris. The term "Cubism" is first used in English.
- April 29 – November 19 – International Exhibition of Art in Rome; the fair marked the beginnings of the National Roman Museum. The British Pavilion, designed by Sir Edwin Lutyens, was taken over in 1912 by the British School at Rome, which is still based there.
- May 11 – A Futurist exhibition in Milan is the first of efforts by the group to make its theories concrete.
- May 20–July 2 – Second International Art Exhibition in Düsseldorf (Kunsthalle), organised by Sonderbund westdeutscher Kunstfreunde und Künstler
- October 1–November 8 – Salon d'Automne; At this exhibition, Jean Metzinger, Albert Gleizes, Henri Le Fauconnier, Fernand Léger, František Kupka, André Lhote, Roger de La Fresnaye, Francis Picabia and Marcel Duchamp, Alexander Archipenko, Joseph Csaky exhibit Cubist works; and André Mare designs the decorative arts section.
- One-man show by Eugeniusz Żak at Galerie Druet.

== Works ==
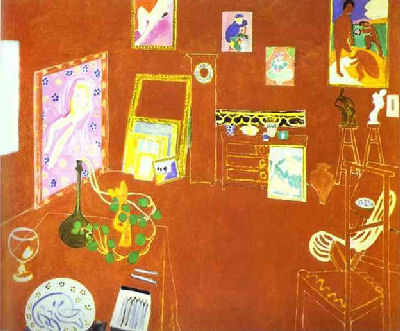
Henri Matisse - L'Atelier Rouge

Jean Metzinger - Le goûter (Tea Time) (76x70cm), Philadelphia Museum of Art. Exhibited at the 1911 Salon d'Automne; André Salmon dubs it "The Mona Lisa of Cubism"

- Edwin Austin Abbey – The Apotheosis of Pennsylvania (mural in House Chamber of the State Capitol of Pennsylvania - completed)
- Umberto Boccioni
  - The Laugh
  - Modern Idol
  - States of Mind: The Farewells; Those Who Go; Those Who Stay
  - The Street Enters the House
- Georges Braque – Still Life
- Carlo Carrà – The Funeral of the Anarchist Galli
- Marc Chagall – I and the Village
- Giorgio de Chirico
  - Enigma of the Hour
  - The Nostalgia of the Infinite
- John Collier – Eve
- Confederate Monument (Gulfport, Mississippi)
- Robert Delaunay – Champs de Mars: La Tour Rouge
- Herbert Dicksee – Where's Master?
- John Duncan – Riders of the Sidhe
- Lydia Field Emmet – Olivia
- Albert Gleizes
  - Portrait de Jacques Nayral
  - La Chasse (The Hunt)
  - Le Chemin, Paysage à Meudon
- J. W. Godward
  - In Realms Of Fancy
  - On The Balcony (second version)
- Duncan Grant – Bathing
- Herbert Hampton – Statue of the Duke of Devonshire, Whitehall
- Howard Chandler Christy – Pocahontas
- Goscombe John – Statue of Charles Rolls, Monmouth
- Alfons Karpiński – The Parisian Street
- Ernst Ludwig Kirchner
  - Böhmischer Waldsee
  - Portrait of a Woman
- Fernand Léger
  - Le compotier (Table and Fruit)
  - Les Toits de Paris (Roofs in Paris)
- Wilhelm Lehmbruck – Kneeling (sculpture)
- Edmund Leighton – Stitching the Standard
- Paul Manship – Duck Girl (bronze)
- Franz Marc
  - Blue-Black Fox
  - Blaues Pferd I (Blue Horse I)
  - Die großen blauen Pferde (The Large Blue Horses)
  - Die großen roten Pferde (The Large Red Horses)
  - The Little Blue Horses
  - Nudes Under Trees
  - The Yellow Cow
- Henri Matisse – L'Atelier Rouge
- Jean Metzinger – Le goûter (Tea Time)
- Piet Mondrian – Gray Tree
- Allen George Newman – Peace Monument
- Emil Nolde – Maskenstilleben ("Masks Still Life")
- Pablo Picasso
  - The Accordionist
  - Le pigeon aux petits pois
- Herbert Ponting – Grotto in an Iceberg (photograph)
- Pierre-Auguste Renoir – Gabrielle with Rose
- John Singer Sargent – Bringing Down Marble from the Quarries to Carrara
- Egon Schiele
  - Mädchen ("Girls")
  - Masturbation
- Paul Signac – Antibes: the towers
- Solomon Joseph Solomon – Portrait of Ramsay MacDonald
- Charles Robinson Sykes – Spirit of Ecstasy (car mascot)
- Tiffany glass curtain at Palacio de Bellas Artes in Mexico City
- Lesser Ury – Woman in the Romanisches Café
- Adolf Wölfli – General view of the island Neveranger

== Births ==
- January 2 – Alexander Dzigurski, Serbian-American seascape artist (d. 1995).
- January 17 – Izis Bidermanas, Lithuanian-born photographer (d. 1980).
- January 31 – Freda Skinner, English sculptor (d. 1993).
- February 10 – Mallica Reynolds ("Kapo"), Jamaican painter, sculptor and religious leader (d. 1989).
- March 4 – Ilona Harima, Finnish painter (d. 1986).
- March 7 – Edmund Teske, American photographer (d. 1996).
- March 17 – David Park, American painter (d. 1960).
- March 23 – Roger Hilton, English painter (d. 1975).
- May 14 – Carl Abrahams, Jamaican painter (d. 2005).
- May 25 – Will Barnet, American painter, printmaker (d. 2012).
- June 11 – Coby Whitmore, American painter and illustrator (d. 1988)
- July 15 – Juliet Pannett, English portrait artist (d. 2005).
- August 10 – Bruce Ariss, American artist (d. 1994).
- September 2 – Romare Bearden, American painter, printmaker (d. 1988).
- October 9 – Joe Rosenthal, American Pulitzer Prize-winning photographer (d. 2006).
- October 25 – Roelof Frankot, Dutch painter (d. 1984).
- November 11 – Roberto Matta, Chilean painter (d. 2002).
- December 16 – Brett Weston, American photographer (d. 1993).
- December 25 – Louise Bourgeois, French-born painter and sculptor (d. 2010).

== Deaths ==
- January 4 – Stefano Bruzzi, Italian painter (b. 1835)
- January 19 – Valentin Serov, Russian painter (b. 1865)
- January 28 – John MacWhirter, Scottish-born landscape painter (b. 1837)
- February 22 – Carl Fredrik Hill, Swedish painter (b. 1849)
- April 6 – Carl von Perbandt, German landscape painter (b. 1832)
- April 13 – William Keith, Scottish American landscape painter (b. 1838)
- April 19 – Ivan Grohar, Slovenian Impressionist painter (b. 1867)
- May 5 – Halsey Ives, American art teacher and curator (b. 1847)
- May 8 – Alphonse Legros, French-born painter and etcher (b. 1837)
- August 1 – Edwin Austin Abbey, American-born painter and illustrator (b. 1852)
- August 12 – Jozef Israëls, Dutch painter (b. 1824)
- September 16 – Hishida Shunsō, Japanese painter (b. 1874)
- October 15 – Ellen Thayer Fisher, American botanical painter (b. 1847)
- November 10 – Félix Ziem, French painter (b. 1821)
