= List of public art in Omaha, Nebraska =

Image	Title / subject	Location and coordinates	Date	Artist / designer	Type	Material	Dimensions	Owner / administrator	Wikidata	Notes
	Angel of Hope	Boys Town	2010	Ortho and Jared Fairbanks	sculpture	bronze	4' x 4'			
	Black Twist	Durham Science Center; University of Nebraska Omaha 41.25864°N 96.014373°W	September 1993	Sidney "Buzz" Buchanan	sculpture	steel			Q136402903	
	Blue Cube	CenturyLink Center	2005	R. Justin Stewart	sculpture	steel	9' x 8' x 8'			Part of Art 4 Omaha
	By the Bucket Full	Gene Leahy Mall	2004	Jamie Burmeister	sculpture	stainless steel, water				Part of the Wind & Water Exhibition
	Castle of Perseverance	University of Nebraska at Omaha 41.258532°N 96.012244°W	1993	Andrew Leicester	sculpture	ceramic, brick	12' x 50'		Q130960757	
	Ceres	Eppley Airfield 41.304974°N 95.880311°W	November 1986	Sidney "Buzz" Buchanan	sculpture	steel			Q130960608	
	Dance of the Cranes	Eppley Airfield 41.286295°N 95.905473°W	1986	John Raimondi	sculpture	bronze	60' x 33' x 15'		Q130476111	
	Dangos	1001 Cass, Hilton Omaha	2005	Jun Kaneko	sculpture	ceramic	9' x 35'			
	Dundee Streetcar	Underwood Ave & Happy Hollow Blvd.	2002	Jay Tschetter	sculpture	brick				
	Fertile Ground Mural	13th and Webster Streets	2009	Meg Saligman	mural	mural	70' x 328'			
	Flamma	Northern Natural Gas Company, 111 South 103 St. 41.247942°N 96.072633°W	1991	Saunders Schultz	sculpture	chrome	28' x 18' x 12'		Q136403080	
	Hammerjack	Pacesetter Corporation, South 96th St. 41.215885°N 96.062013°W	1994	Sidney "Buzz" Buchanan	sculpture	metal	62' x 46' x 37'		Q136402965	
	He Aint Heavy, Father, He's M'Brother	Boys Town	1977	Enzo Plazzotta	sculpture	bronze	6' x 6' x 2' x 19'			
	Healing	Michael F Sorrell Center For Health Science Education; University of Nebraska Medical Center 41.254533°N 95.975608°W	2014	Kevin Box	sculpture	steel			Q136402965	
	Heart and Soul	One Pacific Place, 104th and Pacific St.	2001	Trudy Swanson	sculpture	mixed media				Part of the J. Doe Project
	Illumina	CenturyLink Center	2007	Matthew Placzek	sculpture	bronze				
	Jazz Trio	North 24th St.	2004	Littleton Alston	sculpture	bronze	9' x 6' x 5'			
	Learning to Fly	CenturyLink Center	2005	Matt Lowe	sculpture	steel	12' x 8'			Part of Art 4 Omaha
	Martin Luther King Jr.	Farnam Street, Civic Center Plaza	2003	Littleton Alston	sculpture	metal	9' x 4' x 6'			
	Nebraska Centennial Glass Mosaic	World Building	1967	Tom Bartek	sculpture	ceramic				
	Nebraska Grilles	Roman L. Hruska United States Courthouse	1999	Stephen Robin	sculpture		24' x 63' each			
	O!	University of Nebraska at Omaha	2007	Bart Vargas	sculpture	fiberglass	6' x 5'			
	O! Dude	2101 Douglas Street 45.2582°N 95.943634°W	2010	Leslie Bruning	sculpture	Galvanized steel	9' x 8' x 8'		Q136373612	
	Omaha's Cultural Quilt	CenturyLink Center	2005	Various artists	sculpture					
	Plant Life	CenturyLink Center	2005	David Helm	sculpture	steel	15' tall			Part of Art 4 Omaha
	Pyrata	101 South 108 Ave.	1984	Leslie Bruning	sculpture					
	Quest for Knowledge	University of Nebraska at Omaha	2001	Littleton Alston	sculpture	metal				
	Reading Garden	Millard Library 41.227806°N 96.120497°W	1999	Catherine Ferguson	sculpture	bronze, wood	108" x 104"		Q136403204	
	The Road to Omaha	TD Ameritrade Park Omaha 41.26771°N 95.93272°W	1999	John Lajba	sculpture	bronze			Q130475104	
	Toreador Red	Peter Kiewit Institute	2000	Dale Chiluly	sculpture	blown glass	17' x 7.3'			
	Sky Fin	CenturyLink Center	2005	Catherine Ferguson	sculpture	steel				Part of Art 4 Omaha
	Sounding Stones	Turner Park 41.259182°N 96.002467°W	2005	Leslie Iwai	sculpture	concrete	7' x 7'		Q130960393	
	Spirit of Nebraska Wilderness	First National Bank of Omaha	2002	Kent Ullberg	sculpture	bronze, stainless steel	varies			
	Take a Seat Series	Gene Leahy Mall	1986	Various artists	sculpture					
	Totem	W. Dale Clark Library	2005	Catherine Ferguson	sculpture	steel	25' x 8.5'			
	Valmont Around the World	Valmont Industries		Milton Heinrich	sculpture	metal				
	Vista 17	CenturyLink Center	2005	Jackie Sterba	sculpture	steel				Part of Art 4 Omaha
	Waterworks	University of Nebraska at Omaha	1993	Alice Aycock	sculpture	metal	41' L x 28'h variable width			
	Wind Organ	Standing Bear Lake	1989	Douglas Hollis	sculpture	metal	50' x 70'			
	Yellow Ascending	Joslyn Art Museum	1977	George Sugarman	sculpture	steel	30' high			
