= Floodplain (disambiguation) =

A floodplain is a flat land adjacent to a stream or river that experiences flooding during periods of high discharge.

Floodplain may also refer to:

- Floodplain (Kronos Quartet album), 2009
- Floodplain (Sara Groves album) and its title track, 2015
- Flood Plain (painting), a 1986 painting by Andrew Wyeth

== See also ==
- Floodplain restoration
- Floodplain swamp
