= Dance of the Cranes =

Bronze sculpture by John Raimondi

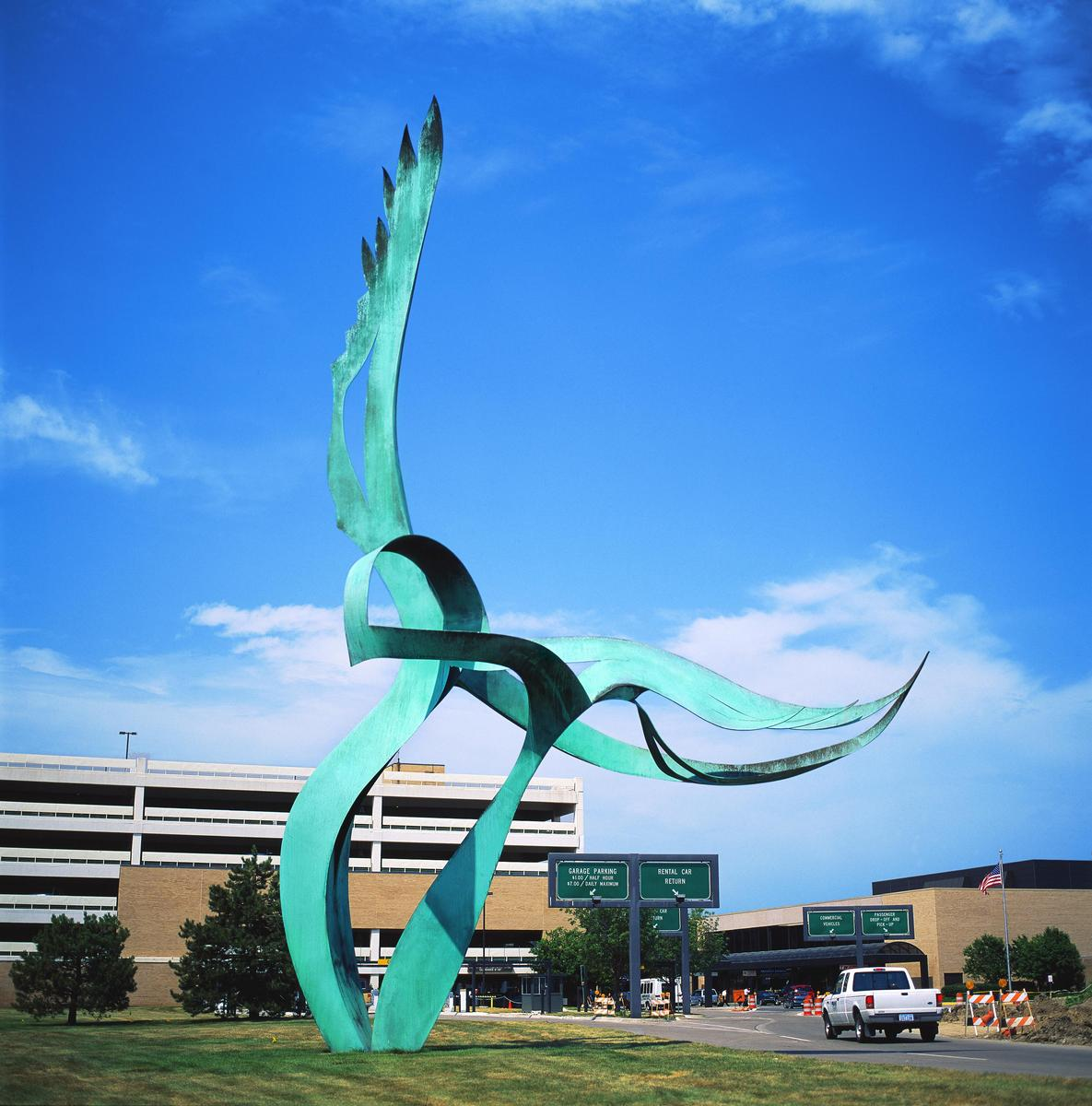
- Interactive map of Dance of the Cranes
- Location: Omaha Eppley Airfield
- Coordinates: 41°17′11″N 95°54′20″W
- Designer: John Raimondi
- Material: Bronze
- Height: 60 feet (18 m)
- Beginning date: 1984
- Completion date: 1988
- Dedicated date: May 20, 1989; 37 years ago

Dance of the Cranes is a bronze sculpture by John Raimondi installed near Abbot Drive on the grounds of Omaha Eppley Airport in Omaha, Nebraska. At the time of its installation it was the largest bronze sculpture in North America.

== History ==
John Raimondi is an American sculptor known as a creator of monumental public sculpture, with works throughout the United States. He had previously worked in Nebraska on the I-80 Bicentennial Sculpture Project. The sculpture was dedicated on 20 May 1989. A reproduction of the sculpture is installed at Doylestown Hospital in Doylestown, PA.

In 2021 the sculpture was moved from its original location near the terminal to a site further south near Abbot Drive on the airport grounds. The entire relocation was performed over the course of one night.

== Description ==
The 60 feet (18 m) sculpture is made from solid bronze. It is an abstract interpretation of the mating dance of the sandhill crane.

== See also ==
- Public art in Omaha, Nebraska
- 1986 in art
- Blue Mustang
