= May Report =

1931 British economic publication

The May Report, within the economic history of the United Kingdom, was a publication on 31 July 1931 by the Committee on National Expenditure ("May Committee"). The May Committee was set up to suggest ways for the government to curb expenditure after a proposal by a Liberal MP. The committee was chaired by Sir George May. Its main conclusions were extensive public sector spending cuts, including a cut to the unemployment benefit, and increased taxation.

== Background ==
The Depression had hit the UK in 1931, and had led to a run on the Bank of England in which foreign investors were withdrawing £2.5 million a day in gold. As most of the Labour party was opposed to the Keynesian ideas proposed by Oswald Mosley, the government was looking for some way to cut public sector spending. The Liberal MP Sir Donald Maclean proposed a House of Commons resolution under which the committee would be appointed. This was accepted by the Labour Chancellor of the Exchequer Philip Snowden, who set up the Committee in February 1931.

== Report ==
The Report was the conclusions of the majority of the Committee, the Liberal nominees Sir Mark Jenkinson and Lord Plender, and the Conservatives' nominees Sir Thomas Royden and Cooper, all with experience in finance. The two Labour nominees, trade unionists Arthur Pugh and Charles Latham, dissented from the Report.

The Report calculated that the deficit for 1932-3 would be £120 million. They believed that taxation already consumed "an unduly large proportion of the national income" and therefore the deficit could only be cured by retrenchment in public expenditure, because such expenditure which was "definitely restrictive of industrial enterprise and employment". They put forward wage cuts for the police, teachers and pre-1925 entrants to the armed forces. Most economies were recommended to be made in the social services and public work schemes because, the Report argued, if the country survived without them a few years previously then they "cannot be essential". The total economies they proposed amounted to £96.5 million, with the largest economy being unemployment insurance at £66.5 million. This included a 10% cut to the unemployment benefit. Which the Labour cabinet voted to accept by 11 to 9, on 28 August 1931.

The two Labour nominees wrote their own Report which blamed the economic difficulties on deflationary policies and accepted limited wage cuts but believed that the "equitable" solution would be to raise taxes on holders of National Debt and other investments with fixed interests.

== Response ==
In response to the Report the Cabinet appointed an economy committee with the Prime Minister Ramsay MacDonald, Snowden, Foreign Secretary Arthur Henderson, Lord Privy Seal James Henry Thomas and President of the Board of Trade William Graham as its members. Although the first meeting of this committee was due to meet on 25 August, MacDonald's holiday was interrupted on 11 August by a message from bankers that there was a run on the pound. The whole Cabinet discussed what to do from 20 August until on 24 August they could not reach a consensus on whether to cut unemployment benefits to ensure a balanced budget. Nine Cabinet members would resign if this was carried through, with the rest (11) not dissenting. The acting leader of the Liberals, Herbert Samuel, suggested a National Coalition Government headed by MacDonald, with Conservative leader Stanley Baldwin agreeing. Therefore, on 24 August a National Government headed by MacDonald came into being, a consequence of which was to split the Labour Party.
