= National Government (United Kingdom) =

UK term for a coalition government

In the politics of the United Kingdom, a National Government is a coalition of some or all of the major political parties. In a historical sense, it refers primarily to the governments of Ramsay MacDonald, Stanley Baldwin and Neville Chamberlain which held office from 1931 until 1940.

The all-party coalitions of H. H. Asquith and David Lloyd George in the First World War were sometimes referred to as National Governments at the time, but are now more commonly called Coalition Governments. The term "National Government" was chosen to dissociate itself from negative connotations of the postwar Lloyd George Coalition.

== Crisis of 1931 ==
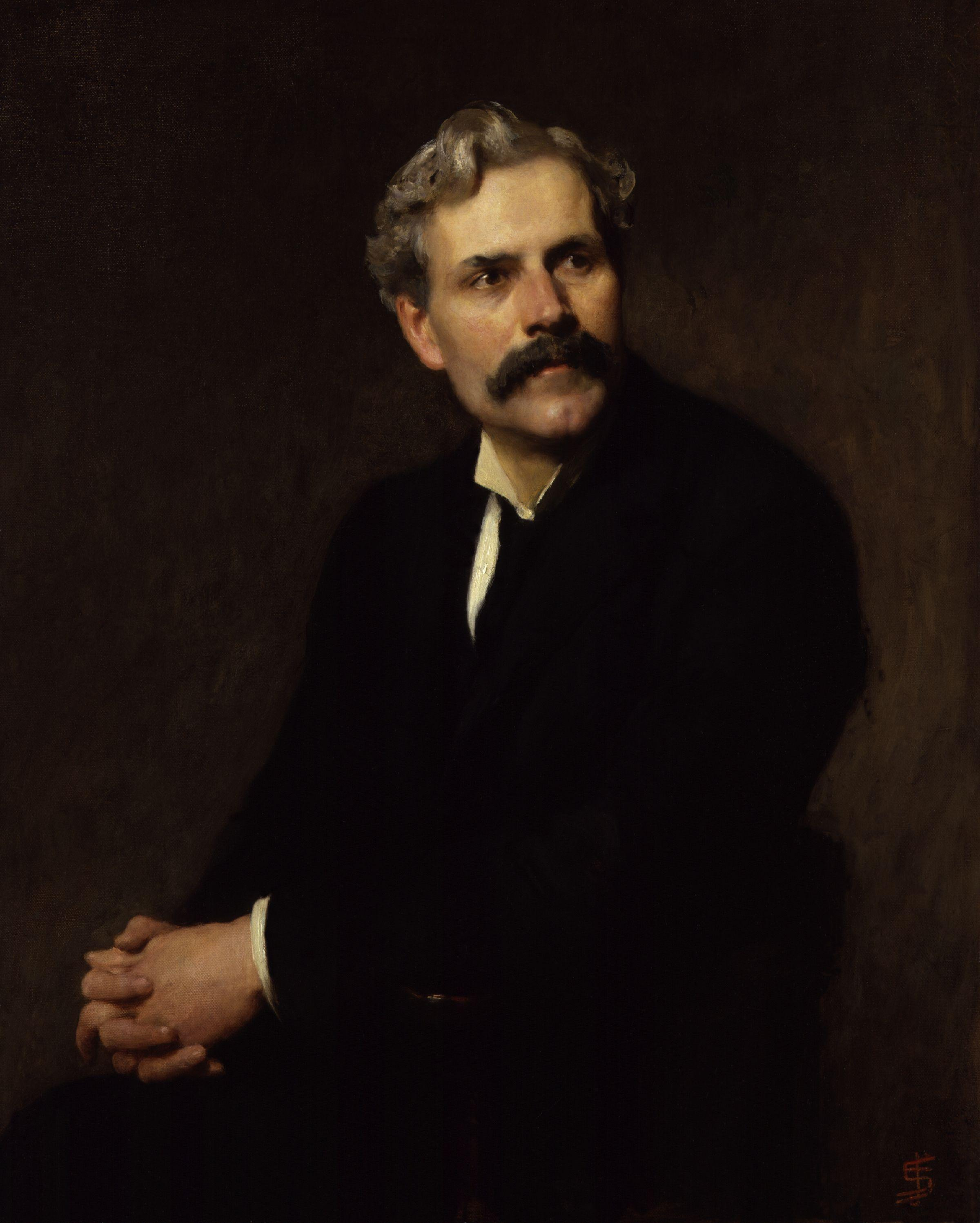
Ramsay MacDonald was Prime Minister for the first four years of National Government. Portrait of Ramsay MacDonald by Solomon Joseph Solomon, 1911

The Wall Street crash of 1929 heralded the global Great Depression and Britain was hit, although not as badly as most countries. The government was trying to achieve several different, contradictory objectives: trying to maintain Britain's economic position by maintaining the pound on the gold standard, balancing the budget, and providing assistance and relief to tackle unemployment. The gold standard meant that British prices were higher than its competitors', so the important export industries did poorly.

In 1931, the situation deteriorated and there was much fear that the budget was unbalanced, which was borne out by the independent May Report which triggered a confidence crisis and a run on the pound. The Labour government agreed in principle to make changes in taxation and to cut expenditure to balance the budget and restore confidence. However, the Cabinet could not agree on the two options available: either introduce tariffs (taxes on imports) or make 20% cuts in unemployment benefit. In the end, MacDonald and Snowden drafted a proposal that would cut benefits by 10%. Trade unions rejected this proposal. When a final vote was taken, the Cabinet was split 11–9 with a minority, including many political heavyweights such as Arthur Henderson and George Lansbury, threatening to resign rather than agree. The unworkable split, on 24 August 1931, made the government resign.

The financial crisis grew worse and decisive government action was needed as the leaders of both the Conservative and Liberal Parties met with King George V, and MacDonald, at first to discuss support for the measures to be taken but later to discuss the shape of the next government. MacDonald had originally wished to tender his resignation but was told to re-consider by the King on the grounds that the majority of opposition MPs and the country at large supported the cuts proposed by the May Report, even if the Labour Party and the Trade Unions led by Ernest Bevin did not. MacDonald duly changed his mind during the night and met with the Conservative and Liberal MPs the following morning. On 24 August, MacDonald agreed and formed a National Government composed of men from all parties with the specific aim of balancing the Budget and restoring confidence. The new cabinet had four Labourites (now called "National Labour") who stood with MacDonald, plus four Conservatives (led by Baldwin and Chamberlain) and two Liberals. Labour unions were strongly opposed and the Labour Party officially repudiated the new National government. It expelled MacDonald and made Henderson the leader of the main Labour party. Henderson led it into the general election on 27 October against the three-party National coalition.

== Early days ==
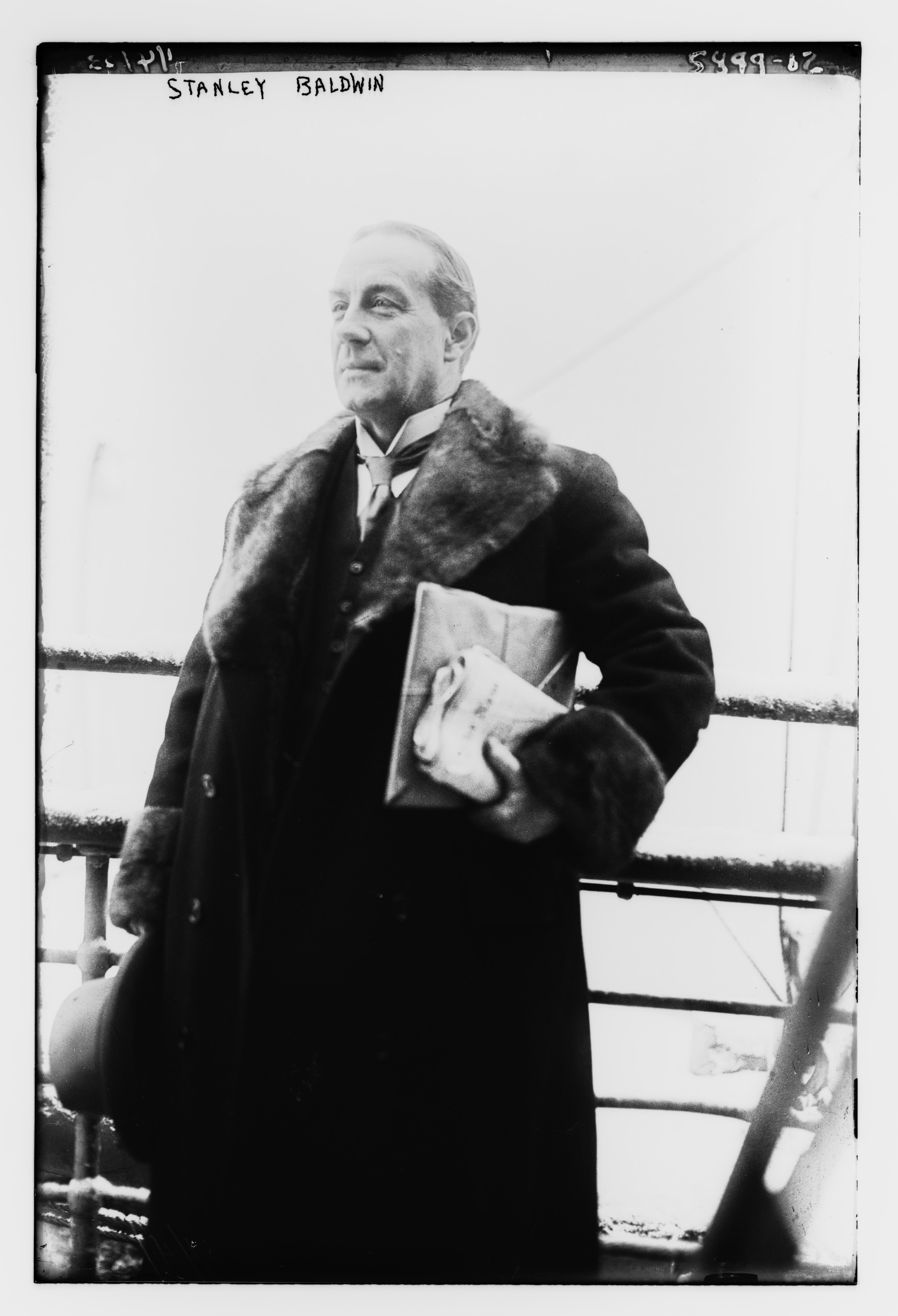
Stanley Baldwin was a dominant figure from the outset of National Government. He became Prime Minister when MacDonald retired.

The Government was initially applauded by most, but the Labour Party were left in a state of confusion with the loss of several of their most prominent figures, and MacDonald, Philip Snowden and James Henry Thomas did little to explain themselves, with the result that the Labour Party soon swung fully against the government. This was in part because of the Trade Unions' decision to oppose all forms of cuts proposed by MacDonald and Snowden in response to the May Report, which had concluded the UK government needed to curb government expenditure to reduce the budget deficit amid the fallout from the Great Depression that began in 1929. The May Report in particular recommended to MacDonald that his Labour government cut unemployment benefit by 20%. The Trade Unions that represented a large proportion of the Labour party's base refused to support any cuts to benefits or wages except to "the salaries of Ministers". Efforts to bring public expenditure cuts produced further problems, including a mutiny in the Royal Navy over pay cuts (the Invergordon Mutiny), with the result that the pound sterling came under renewed pressure, and the government was forced to take the radical step of taking the pound off the gold standard altogether.

Debate then broke out about further steps to tackle the economic problems. At the same time the Labour Party officially expelled all of its members who supported the National Government, including MacDonald. Increasingly, the majority of the Cabinet came to believe that a protective tariff was necessary to support British industry and provide revenue and that a general election should be fought to secure a mandate but this was anathema to the Liberal Party. The Liberals' acting leader and Home Secretary, Sir Herbert Samuel, fought in Cabinet against an election but found the Liberal Party dividing in several directions over the course of action. One group under Sir John Simon emerged as the Liberal Nationals, was prepared to accept the tariff and expressed willingness to take the place of the main Liberals in the government. The party's official leader, David Lloyd George was incapacitated at this time but called for the Liberals to abandon the government altogether and stand independently in defence of free trade, but his call was heeded only by four other MPs, all of whom were his close relatives.

It was eventually agreed that the government as a whole would seek a "Doctor's Mandate" to take a free hand and that each party would issue its own manifesto. Supporters of MacDonald formed the National Labour Organisation and the parties agreed to allow their local organisations to agree whether or not to oppose each other. The government was opposed by the Labour Party, Lloyd George and his Liberals and the New Party of Sir Oswald Mosley. Within the parties there was particular conflict between the Conservatives and Liberals. The 1931 general election campaign run by the National Government figures stressed their policies would aim to avoid any risk of Britain seeing such events as those of Germany two years ago including hyperinflation and MacDonald famously waved worthless Deutschmarks to emphasise the point. The result of the 1931 general election was the greatest landslide in British political history, the National Government winning a total of 556 seats and a Parliamentary majority of 500. It was a disaster for Labour, which was reduced to a small minority of 52. MacDonald was unified with the Conservatives and Liberal National leaders on one platform (he returning 13 of his 20 National Labour candidates).

As few Labour MPs refused to abandon the wishes of the Trade Unionists led by Ernest Bevin, the support for the re-elected National Government was heavily Conservative.

== 1931–1935 ==
Although the Conservatives had a bare majority in Cabinet of 11, compared to nine non-Conservatives, the former held comparatively few of the most important jobs. The two groups of Liberals were similarly unbalanced in terms of posts, the official Liberals holding one more seat than the National Liberals, despite the parliamentary position being reversed. That balance was to cause tensions, particularly as the Diehard wing of the Conservative party felt unrepresented.

The government entered protracted wrangling over whether or not to introduce tariffs. Both the Liberals and Snowden found it particularly difficult to accept but were in a heavy minority. However, both MacDonald and Baldwin wished to maintain the multiparty nature of the Government. On the suggestion of Hailsham, it was agreed to suspend the principle of Cabinet collective responsibility to allow the Liberals to oppose the introduction of tariffs while remaining in government. This held for some months.

In 1932, Sir Donald MacLean died. MacDonald came under pressure not to merely appoint another Liberal, particularly as it was felt that they would be over-represented, and so instead appointed the Conservative Lord Irwin (later Lord Halifax). Further tensions emerged over the Ottawa Agreement, which set up a series of tariff agreements within the British Empire, and the remaining Liberals and Snowden resigned their ministerial posts although they continued to support the government from the backbenches for another year. MacDonald considered resigning as well to allow a party government to take office but was persuaded to remain even though his health was now in decline. In domestic politics, he increasingly allowed Baldwin to give a lead, but in foreign affairs, the main direction was determined by MacDonald and Simon.

The most prominent policy of the National Government in the early 1930s was the proposal to introduce Indian Home Rule, a measure fiercely opposed by the Diehard wing of the Conservative party, with Winston Churchill one of the most open opponents. The Government of India Act 1935 passed over fierce opposition and was intended to begin the process of granting self-rule to India.

== Baldwin takes over ==
With MacDonald's health failing, he retired as prime minister in June 1935, to be succeeded by Baldwin.

Increasingly foreign affairs were coming to dominate political discourse and in November Baldwin led the government to victory in the 1935 general election on a platform of support for the League of Nations and sanctions against Italy for invading Abyssinia. The following month a massive storm developed when it emerged that the new Foreign Secretary, Sir Samuel Hoare, had negotiated the Hoare-Laval Pact which proposed to cede most of Abyssinia to Italy. Many were outraged, including many government MPs, and the agreement was dropped and Hoare sacked, though he later returned to government. The government sponsored a series of conferences to enable more home rule in India and other colonies.

Baldwin's last years in office were seen as a period of drift, but in late 1936 he achieved a notable triumph in resolving the Edward VIII abdication crisis without major repercussions. Baldwin took the occasion of George VI's coronation as an opportune moment to retire.

== Peacetime government of Neville Chamberlain ==
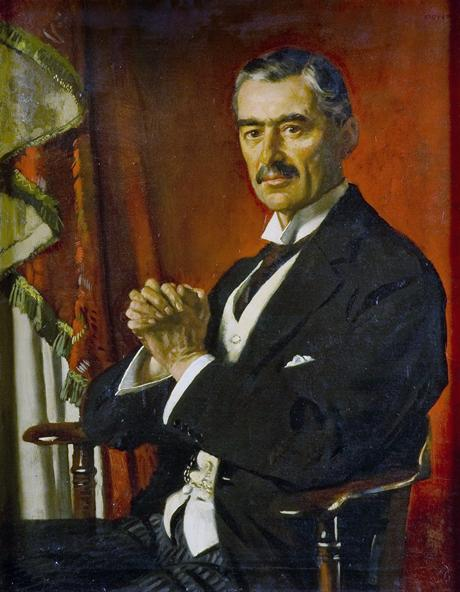
Neville Chamberlain had succeeded Baldwin as Prime Minister in 1937

Neville Chamberlain was seen by many as the only possible successor to Baldwin, and his appointment as prime minister was widely credited with bringing a new dynamism to the government. With a strong track record as a radical Minister of Health and competent Chancellor of the Exchequer many expected Chamberlain to provide a strong lead in domestic affairs and here the government had a number of successes, such as over the nationalisation of coal mining royalties, the curtailing of excess working hours by the Factory Act and much slum clearance. Another success was the Holidays with Pay Act 1938, which gave a fortnight's paid holiday a year to workers, starting in 1939. The school leaving age was also to be increased from Autumn 1939, but was deferred as war loomed. Further reforms were curtailed by the increased international tension which came to occupy most of his time.

In foreign affairs, the government sought to increase Britain's armaments, while maintaining the unity of the Empire and Dominions and preventing any one power from becoming dominant on the continent of Europe. These proved increasingly difficult to reconcile, as many Dominions were reluctant to support Britain in the event of her going to war, and so military action risked splitting the Empire. Chamberlain took a strong personal lead in foreign affairs and sought to bring about peaceful revision of European frontiers in areas where many commentators had long-acknowledged grievances. In this, he received much popular support at the time, but the policy has been much attacked since. The most prominent point in the policy of appeasement came in September 1938, when the Munich Agreement was negotiated. Following the agreement, the government sped up the re-armament process in the hope of being ready for war when it came. At the same time, it took a tougher line in foreign affairs, including making a guarantee to defend Poland against Germany.

== Outbreak of war ==
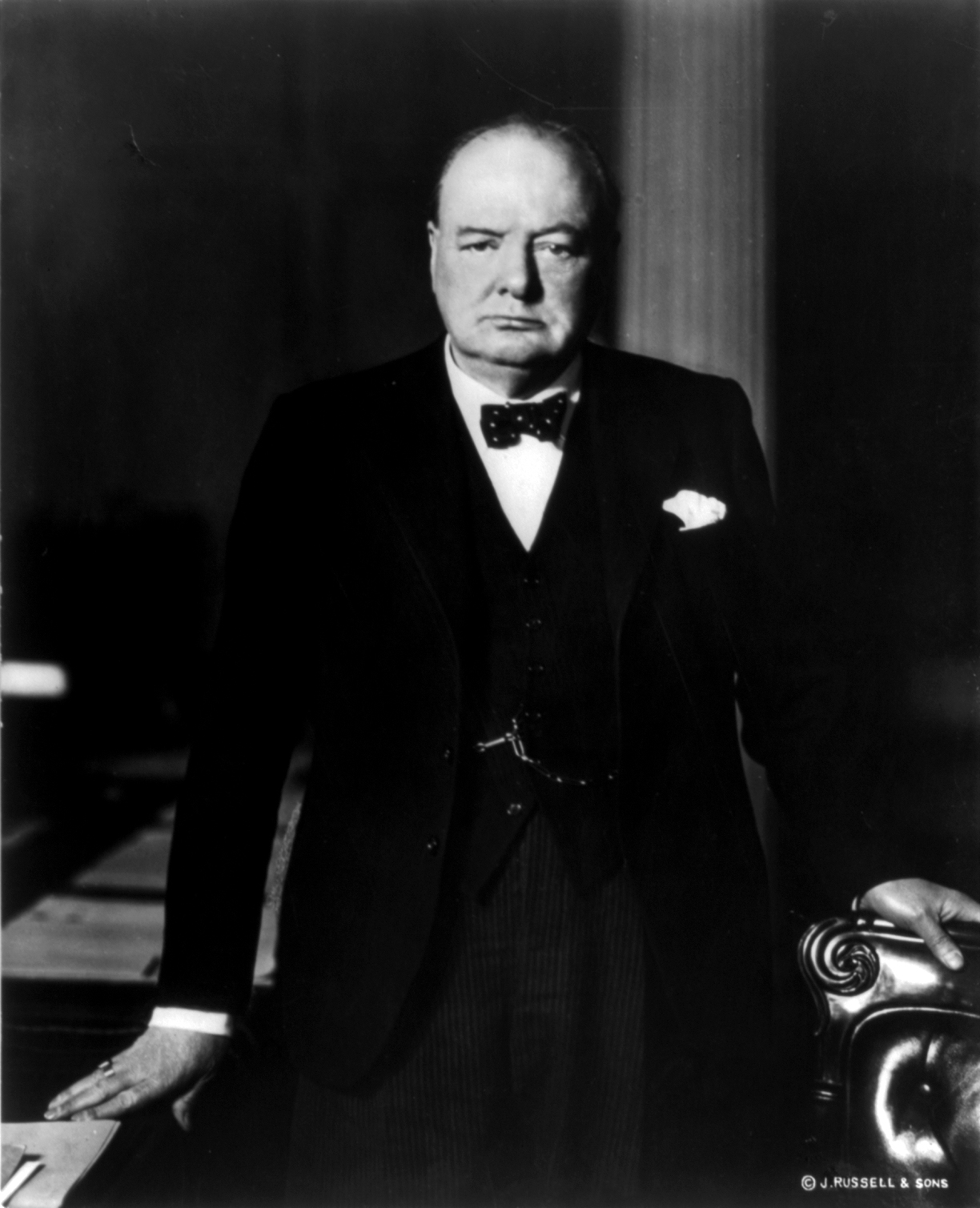
Winston Churchill succeeded Chamberlain in 1940. He served as prime minister for most of the Second World War.

When Germany invaded Poland in September 1939, Britain declared war in tandem with France, supported by all of the Dominions except Ireland. For some time there had been calls to expand Chamberlain's war ministry by bringing in members of the official Labour and Liberal parties but both parties refused to join (with the one exception of Liberal MP Gwilym Lloyd George, who joined the government as Parliamentary Secretary to the Board of Trade). For the first few months of war Britain saw comparatively little action apart from at sea, but the failure of the Norwegian campaign led to a massive outcry in Parliament.

On 7 and 8 May 1940, a two-day debate took place in Parliament, known to history as the Norway Debate. Initially a discussion of what had gone wrong in that field, it soon turned into a general debate on the conduct of the war with fierce criticism expressed by all sides of the House. The government won the debate, albeit with a reduced majority, but over the next two days it became increasingly clear that Labour and the Liberals would have to be brought into government and that Chamberlain was unable to achieve this. On 10 May 1940, Germany invaded the Low Countries and Chamberlain finally bowed to pressure and resigned, bringing the life of the National Government to a close. It was succeeded by an all-party coalition headed by Winston Churchill.

== Caretaker government ==
Towards the end of May 1945, with the war over in Europe but still continuing against Japan, the war coalition ended with the departure of Labour and the Liberals. Churchill formed a new administration, predominantly Conservative but with the support of the National Liberals and some independent figures. Churchill called his new government “a new National Government” in the hope of attracting Liberal and moderate support, but it is better remembered to history as the Churchill Caretaker Government. The short-lived government ended in late July when Churchill unexpectedly lost the 1945 United Kingdom general election.

== Bibliography ==
- Bassett, Reginald. 1931 Political Crisis (2nd ed., Aldershot: Macmillan 1986) ISBN 0-566-05138-9 online
- Howell, David. MacDonald's Party: Labour Identities and Crisis, 1922–1931 (Oxford U. P. 2002). ISBN 0-19-820304-7.
- Hyde, H. Montgomery. Baldwin: The Unexpected Prime Minister (1973)
- Jenkins, Roy (1987). Baldwin excerpt and text search
- Marquand, David. Ramsay Macdonald (Jonathan Cape, 1977) pp. 604–701.
- Mowat, Charles Loch. Britain between the Wars: 1918–1945 (1955) pp. 413–79
- Raymond, John (1960). Raymond, John (ed.). The Baldwin Age. London: Eyre & Spottiswoode. Archived from the original on 10 October 2019 – via Questia.
- Smart, Nick. The National Government. 1931–40 (Macmillan 1999). ISBN 0-333-69131-8.
- Taylor, A. J. P. English History 1914–1945 (1965). pp. 321–88.
- Thorpe, Andrew. Britain in the 1930s. The Deceptive Decade, (Oxford: Blackwell, 1992). ISBN 0-631-17411-7.
- Toye, Richard (2015). The Roar of the Lion: The Untold Story of Churchill's World War II Speeches. Oxford: Oxford University Press. ISBN 978-01-98715-45-0.
- Williamson, Philip. National Crisis and National Government. British Politics, the Economy and the Empire, 1926–1932 (Cambridge U. P., 1992). ISBN 0-521-36137-0.
