= Mural with Blue Brushstroke =

Mural painting by Roy Lichtenstein

- Artist: Roy Lichtenstein
- Year: 1986
- Movement: Pop art
- Dimensions: 2070 cm × 990 cm (810 in × 390 in)
- Location: AXA Center; 787 Seventh Avenue, New York City

Mural with Blue Brushstroke is a 1986 mural painting by Roy Lichtenstein that is located in the atrium of 787 Seventh Avenue (originally known as the Equitable Tower and previously known as the AXA Center) in New York City. The mural was the subject of the book Roy Lichtenstein: Mural With Blue Brushstroke. The mural includes highlights of Lichtenstein's earlier works.

== Detail ==
Lichtenstein was commissioned to create a large public work in the Equitable Tower. He was offered the commission in 1984 and began design work that fall.

Like his 1973–1974 Artist's Studio series works, such as Artist's Studio—Look Mickey, Mural with Blue Brushstroke copies or reworks many of his own work as well as a few works of other artists. Several objects in the mirror had previously been incorporated in Artist's Studio—Look Mickey: the door, part of a mirror and an entablature. The beach ball from Girl with Ball is held by Léger-like forms rather than a young woman, and the top part of the ball is now a sunrise for a landscape with randomly placed dots. A light blue "brushstroke" represents a waterfall. The combination of images is a pastiche.

Lichtenstein used his standard large canvas easel. He "selected the motifs, he made a series of drawings and then collaged them together to make a maquette, measuring 34.25 by 17.5 inches, which became the working plan for the actual mural." Images were selected, and slides of the collage were projected onto the building wall. From these slides, the outline of the mural was drawn by Lichtenstein and his assistants David Lichtenstein, Robert McKeever, Arch O'Learhy, Brian O'Leary, James di Pasquale, and Fernando Pomalaza. The outlines were filled in with color on the plaster wall. The mural took six weeks to complete. The mural incorporates 18 colors, more than triple his usual palette of the primary colors plus black and white.

Lichtenstein had a strong preference for rectangular canvases. Analysis of his work refers to non-rectangular canvases as imperfect paintings and are described as being characteristic of Frank Stella. Mural with Blue Brushstroke is regarded as Lichtenstein's first 'imperfect' painting due to the depiction of a carpenter's triangle and French curve. It is an extreme sort of imperfection because the painting extends beyond the frame.

== Critical review ==
The Mural offers "a hedonistic view of earthly insignificance." When the mural opened, Michael Brenson of The New York Times described the event as "an event of major artistic importance. It marks a commitment to art on the part of a prominent American corporation that is as generous and innovative as any before."

This is an example of a brushstroke that serves to "structurally anchor a whole complex composition..." The work is composed of "a cacophony of images" that serve as a "montage of his earlier subjects." The work is the embodiment of commercialism shrouded in the "aura of artistic fame".

== See also ==
- 1986 in art
