= Bringing Down Marble from the Quarries to Carrara =

Painting by John Singer Sargent

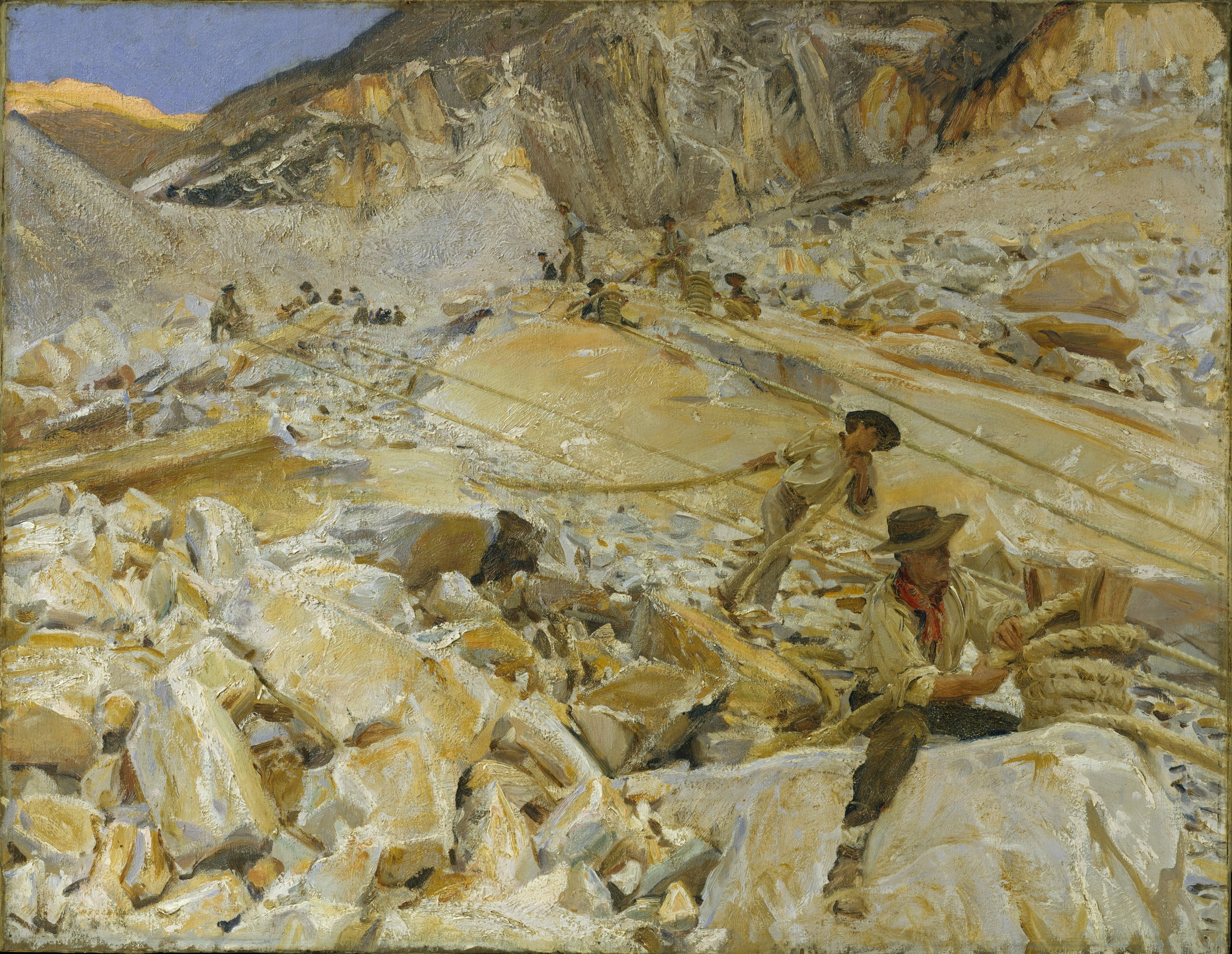
- Artist: John Singer Sargent
- Year: 1911
- Medium: oil paint, canvas
- Dimensions: 71.4 cm (28.1 in) × 91.8 cm (36.1 in)
- Location: Metropolitan Museum of Art
- Accession no.: 17.97.1
- Identifiers: The Met object ID: 12052

Bringing Down Marble from the Quarries to Carrara is a 1911 painting by John Singer Sargent which is part of the collection of the Metropolitan Museum of Art.

The painting depicts the major effort and gruelling labor involved in the manual quarrying of marble at the Carrara quarries in Tuscany, North Italy, the scale of which is suggested by the difference in size of the men working at the opposite ends of the ropes stretching diagonally across the composition.

The painting is not on view.

== See also ==
- List of works by John Singer Sargent
- 1911 in art
