= The Accordionist =

1911 painting by Pablo Picasso

- Artist: Pablo Picasso
- Year: 1911
- Medium: Oil on canvas
- Dimensions: 130.2 cm × 89.5 cm (51 1/4 in × 35 1/4 in)
- Location: Solomon R. Guggenheim Museum, New York, United States
- Accession: 37.537

The Accordionist (French: L’accordéoniste) is a 1911 oil on canvas painting by Pablo Picasso. The painting portrays a seated man playing an accordion. The division of three-dimensional forms into a two-dimensional plane indicates that the painting is in the style of Analytical Cubism, which was developed by Picasso and Georges Braque between 1907 and 1914. The painting is now in the Solomon R. Guggenheim Museum in New York City.

== Background ==
This painting was produced during a period in Picasso's art known as Analytical Cubism. Cubism was developed between 1907 and 1914 by Picasso and Georges Braque after they met in 1907. It was an innovative new style of art, which in its early stages involved breaking surfaces into sharply defined planes. In 1911, Picasso and Georges Braque spent the summer at Céret, in the French Pyrenees, a period that is considered to be an important moment in the development of Cubism.

The onset of cubism can be viewed as a rejection of traditional painting techniques and realistic imitations of the natural world. Traditional techniques, like modelling and perspective, were replaced by fractured objects reduced to geometric shapes and shallow space. The subject could also be depicted from multiple viewpoints.

Until 1910, the subject of cubist artworks could still be interpreted, as the figure or object in the paintings was conveyed in a fractured form, but reassembled to a certain extent to offer a distinguishable representation of the subject. However, from 1910 to 1912, Picasso and Braque abstracted their works even further, by reducing the subject to just a series of overlapping planes that were more complex and difficult to comprehend. The paintings of this period were also dominated by near monochromatic hues of brown, grey and black.

== Description ==
The complex fragmented composition of The Accordionist requires some persistence in order to determine the outlines of the subject. The painting displays a seated accordionist, which is defined by a series of vertically aligned triangular planes, semicircles and right angles. The folds of the accordion and its keys can be located in the centre, while the lower area of the canvas displays the volutes of an armchair.

== Significance and legacy ==
The Accordionist demonstrates how Picasso developed the innovative style of Cubism to the point of complete abstraction. It has been described as a "baffling composition" and is so incomprehensible that its former owners mistook it for a landscape because it bears the inscription "Céret" on the reverse. Solomon R. Guggenheim Museum states that, "Picasso’s elusive references to recognizable forms and objects cannot always be precisely identified and, as the Museum of Modern Art’s founding director Alfred H. Barr, Jr. observed, 'the mysterious tension between painted image and 'reality' remains'."
