= Axa Equitable Center =

Office skyscraper in Manhattan, New York

787 Seventh Avenue
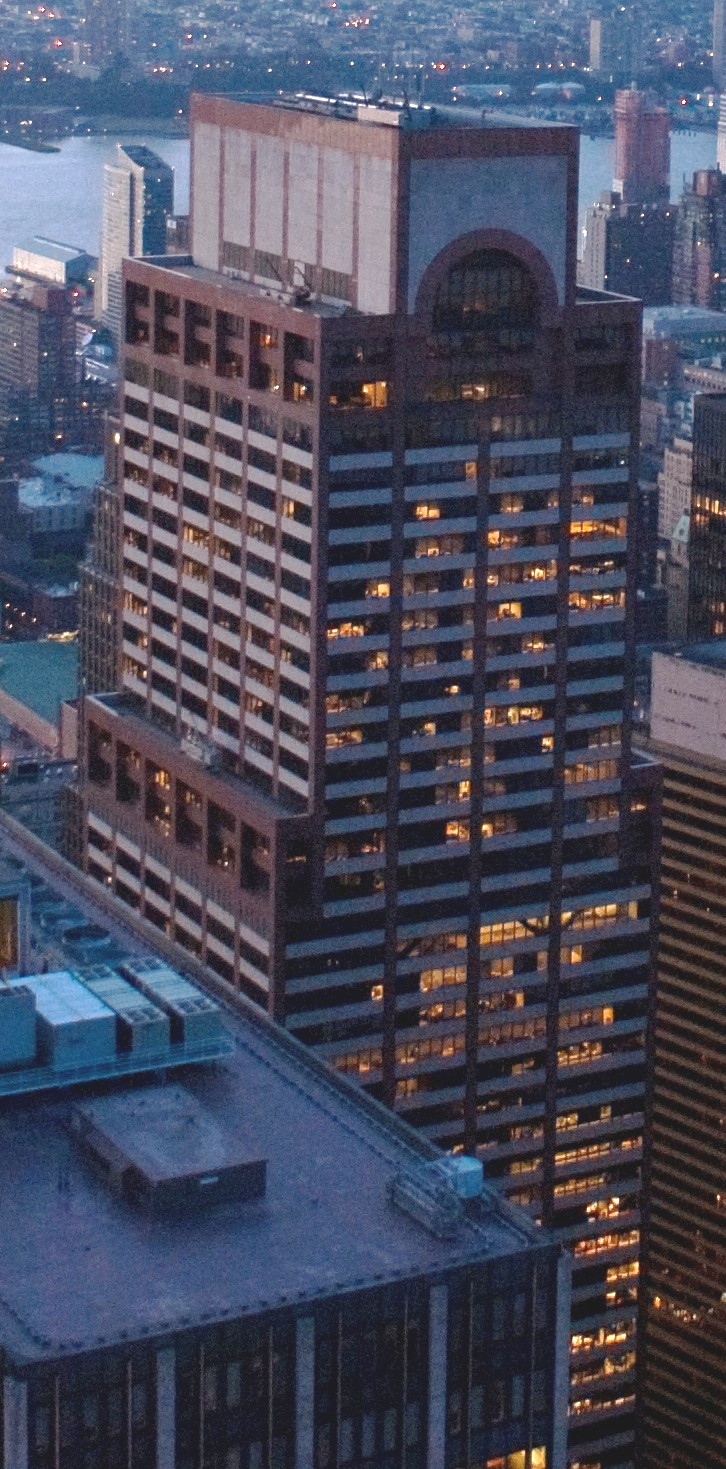
- View to the northwest (September 2009)

General information
- Status: Completed
- Type: Commercial building (offices and retail)
- Location: 787 Seventh Avenue, Manhattan, New York
- Coordinates: 40°45′42″N 73°58′54″W
- Completed: 1986

Height
- Roof: 752 ft (229 m)
- Top floor: 51

Technical details
- Floor count: 54

Design and construction
- Architect: Edward Larrabee Barnes
- Developer: Equitable Life Assurance Society
- Structural engineer: Severud Associates
- Main contractor: Turner Construction

Axa Equitable Center (originally the Equitable Tower or Equitable Center West) is an office skyscraper at 787 Seventh Avenue, between 51st and 52nd Streets, in the Midtown Manhattan neighborhood of New York City. Completed in 1986 and designed by Edward Larrabee Barnes, the building measures 752 feet (229 m) tall with 54 stories. Equitable Center West was developed by the Equitable Life Assurance Society (later renamed Equitable Holdings, part of Axa) adjacent to Equitable's existing skyscraper at 1285 Avenue of the Americas.

The facade is clad in granite, applied in a two-tone pattern of white horizontal and red vertical bands. The building has three setbacks, as well as a penthouse at the top with arched windows. Equitable acquired an extensive collection of artwork to display in the building's public spaces. There is a public galleria from 51st to 52nd Street, which forms part of 6½ Avenue, as well as an arched entrance atrium from Seventh Avenue. The complex also includes an underground concourse, several restaurants, and a corporate auditorium.

The building was proposed in the early 1980s and, after the site was acquired, Equitable's board approved the plans for the tower in 1983. When the tower opened, the company's corporate offices occupied about a third of the space, and the ground story had commercial concerns such as the Le Bernardin restaurant and a branch of the Whitney Museum. Equitable only used the tower as its headquarters until the late 1990s, and the California Public Employees' Retirement System (CalPERS) acquired Axa Equitable Center in 2016.

== Site ==
787 Seventh (formerly known as the AXA Equitable Building) is at 787 Seventh Avenue in the Midtown Manhattan neighborhood of New York City. The building's rectangular land lot occupies the western half of the city block bounded by Seventh Avenue to the west, 51st Street to the south, Sixth Avenue (Avenue of the Americas) to the east, and 52nd Street to the north. The site covers 80,333 square feet (7,463.2 m^{2}), with a frontage of 200 feet (61 m) on Seventh Avenue and 400 feet (120 m) along the side streets.

Adjacent is 1285 Avenue of the Americas (1285 Sixth Avenue; Equitable Center East), designed by Skidmore, Owings & Merrill and constructed from 1959 to 1961. The Sixth Avenue building occupies the eastern half of the city block. The sidewalk in front of the building is made of pink granite, extending eastward in front of 1285 Sixth Avenue. The sidewalks adjacent to 1285 Sixth Avenue comprise Urban Plaza North and South, designed by Scott Burton. Axa Equitable Center is also near 810 Seventh Avenue to the northwest, the Sheraton New York Times Square Hotel and Flatotel New York City to the north, Credit Lyonnais Building to the northeast, 1271 Avenue of the Americas to the southeast, The Michelangelo to the south, and the Winter Garden Theatre to the southwest. The site occupied by Axa Equitable Center had contained the Victoria and Abbey hotels just before the skyscraper's construction.

== Architecture ==
Axa Equitable Center was designed in the postmodern style by Edward Larrabee Barnes for the Equitable Life Assurance Society. The building is 752 feet (229 m) tall with 54 stories. (Note: The Skyscraper Center and the New York City Department of City Planning cite the structure as having 51 stories, counting the multi-story rooftop penthouse as one story.) Severud Associates was the structural engineer and Turner Construction was the main contractor. The structure uses 300,000 square feet (28,000 m^{2}) of stone and 28,000 short tons (25,000 long tons; 25,000 t) of steel. Rather than dictate the precise style for the building, Equitable CEO John B. Carter had requested only that Barnes create "a top-quality building". Nonetheless, Carter had specific requests for several of the interior spaces.

For Equitable Tower's construction, Equitable acquired $7 million or $7.5 million worth of artwork to display in both public and private spaces. The work includes large murals by Sol LeWitt and Roy Lichtenstein and sculptures by Scott Burton and Barry Flanagan. In addition, works by Milton Avery, George Bellows, James E. Buttersworth, Marsden Hartley, and Alex Katz decorated the offices. Some works, such as a mobile by Alexander Calder and the bronze sculpture Day by Paul Manship, were already in Equitable's art collection when Equitable Tower was built. Equitable hired several experts, including art consultant Emily Braun, to assist in arranging the artwork. Equitable publications referred to 787 Seventh Avenue, along with 1285 Sixth Avenue, as "one square block of art".

=== Form and facade ===
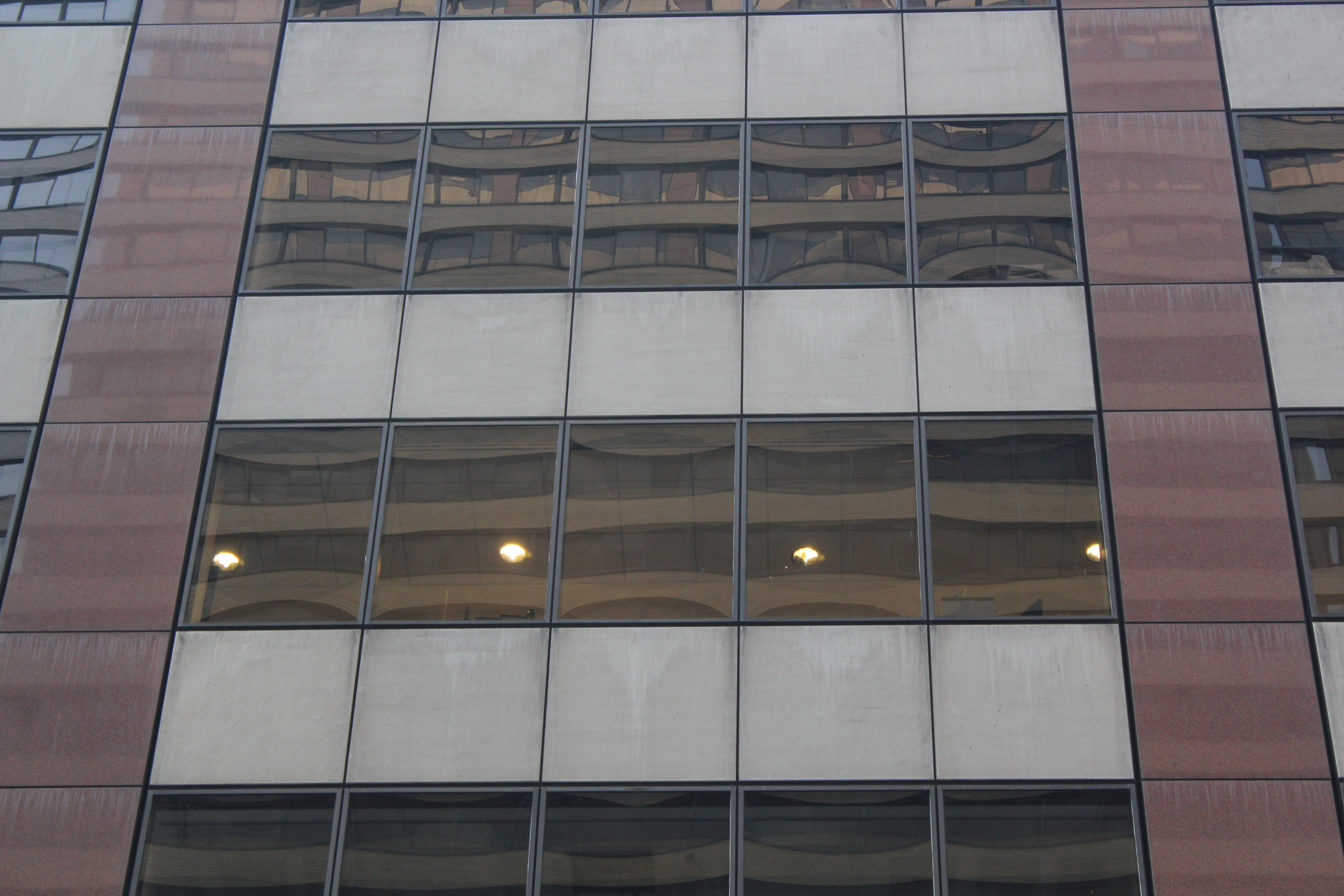
Facade detail

The entire building is set back 10 feet (3.0 m) from the street on each side. A public galleria runs from north to south, dividing the lowest six floors of the building. The seventh and eighth stories span the north and south ends of the galleria. The north and south elevations rise with three setbacks, while the west and east elevations rise without setbacks. The setbacks on the north and south elevations are placed at the 12th, 34th, and 50th stories, with each setback being 14 feet (4.3 m) deep. Barnes intended for the setbacks to recall those on 30 Rockefeller Plaza and the International Building, two of Rockefeller Center's tallest buildings. One of the early plans for Axa Equitable Center, which was illustrated in a monograph of Barnes's work, was for the massing to instead contain setbacks on the west and east, with the north and south elevations rising as a slab-like wall from the street. In a subsequent iteration of the plans, Barnes had planned deep porches at the setbacks.

The facade is made of limestone, granite, and glass. The Indiana limestone and Brazilian granite on the facade is applied in a two-tone pattern. The vertical pilasters are clad with reddish-brown granite, which is also used for some horizontal bands just below each setback. The pilasters divide the facades into horizontal spandrel bands of buff-colored limestone, which alternate with glass windows on each floor. Barnes had used these materials because they harmonized with the colors and materials used on the neighboring buildings. Axa Equitable Center uses 5,800 panes of glass on its facade.

The main entrance on Seventh Avenue is set within a semicircular-headed arch measuring 72 feet (22 m) tall. There is a loading dock at the eastern end of the 52nd Street elevation. There are double-height mechanical spaces at each setback. These double-height floors contain recessed windows to give the impression that the red pilasters are massive piers; the recessed windows were inspired by those in Art Deco buildings. The recessed windows on the double-height floors also wrap around to the west and east elevations. The topmost penthouse is embellished with large triumphal-arched windows on its west and east elevations, which illuminate the Equitable boardrooms. The boardroom windows measure 42 feet (13 m) in diameter and 53 feet (16 m) tall. While the original plan had been to use ocular windows, Barnes instead used triumphal arches because they allowed more light to enter the boardroom spaces.

=== Galleria and concourse ===
At the middle of the city block is the galleria from 51st to 52nd Street. It is one of six passageways that form 6½ Avenue, a set of full-block passageways from 51st to 57th Street between Sixth and Seventh Avenues. The passageway was built as a "through-block connection" under the Special Midtown District, created in 1982. The space measures 45 feet (14 m) wide and 91 feet (28 m) tall underneath the north and south ends, where the seventh and eighth floors cross the galleria. The center of the space, beneath the skylights, is 124 feet (38 m) tall. Burton designed outdoor seating for the galleria. On the galleria's eastern wall is a passageway to 1285 Sixth Avenue's lobby, which originally connected with the Paine Webber Art Gallery in that building. The lobbies of 1285 Sixth Avenue and Equitable Center measured a combined 800 feet (240 m) long. An elevator lobby for the First National Bank of Chicago, just east of the galleria, contained Agnes Denes's artwork Hypersphere: The Earth in the Shape of the Universe, a set of 144 glass panels.

LeWitt commissioned a set of six geometric artworks for the walls of the galleria entitled Wall Drawing: Bands of Lines in Four Colors and Four Directions, Separated by Gray Bands. As the name indicates, LeWitt's artwork consists of vertical, horizontal, and diagonal bands in four colors, created in acrylic paint on limestone. These works, which are up to 106 feet (32 m) high, are illuminated by natural light coming through the rooftop skylights. In addition, Flanagan designed two bronze sculptures at the galleria's north and south ends, each depicting animals in whimsical scenes. The north end contains Young Elephant (1986), while the south end contains Hare on Bell (1985).

Two escalators lead from the galleria to Axa Center's public basement concourse. The escalators are placed within a glass enclosure containing a gold-colored frame. The basement concourse is connected to Rockefeller Center's underground concourse, which in turn provides a connection to the New York City Subway's 47th–50th Streets–Rockefeller Center station. Axa Center's basement concourse also contains the Athletic & Swim Club, which has a fitness center and a small swimming pool. Valerie Jaudon had created a mural for the swimming pool's wall, measuring 72 by 12 feet (21.9 by 3.7 m).

=== Interior ===
Axa Center contains 1,740,000 square feet (162,000 m^{2}) of interior space. According to the New York City Department of City Planning, the building has a gross floor area of 1,633,544 square feet (151,761.2 m^{2}). Equitable was allowed to include an additional 49,161 square feet (4,567.2 m^{2}) in exchange for providing privately owned public space. The steel superstructure contains two-story outrigger trusses wrapping around the 11th and 36th stories, which transfer the structural loads and absorb the wind loads at each of the setbacks. Belt trusses connect the outrigger trusses to the building's structural core. The roof is surrounded by a hat truss, behind which is mechanical equipment.

From the beginning, 787 Seventh Avenue contained several "smart" building systems, such as high-capacity fiber optic cables and conduits, as well as a computerized display to monitor energy use, security, and elevators. The "smart" systems cost $2 to $4 million, though that cost also included a retrofit of 1285 Sixth Avenue. The building is internally connected to 1285 Sixth Avenue at the ground floor, concourse, and first eight stories. The 787 Seventh Avenue building was known as Equitable Center West or Equitable Tower, while the 1285 Sixth Avenue building was known as Equitable Center East. The two structures were initially known collectively as the "Equitable Center".

==== Atrium and lobby ====
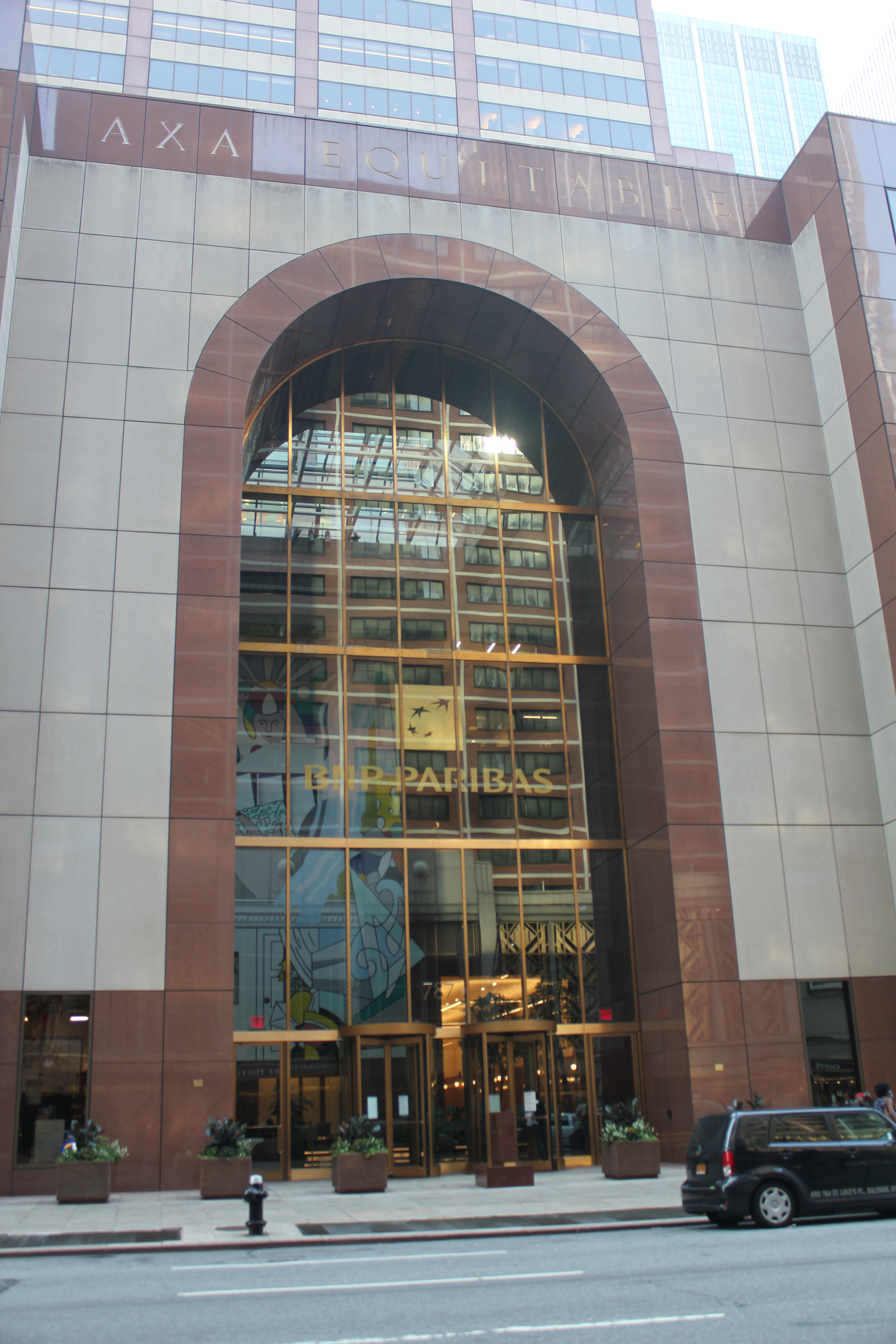
Main entrance on Seventh Avenue

Leading from Seventh Avenue is a five-story atrium, which serves as the main lobby. The atrium is an 80-foot (24 m) cube. Its large size is in part due to a commercial holdout who did not leave the site until construction had already started. At the center of the atrium, Burton designed Atrium Furnishment, which consists of a 40-foot-wide (12 m) marble semicircular banquette and a circular marble fountain with trees. Though the atrium in general has a white marble floor, Atrium Furnishment is surrounded by red granite pavers, which were intended to provide a contrast between the circular artwork and the cubical atrium. A bronze band surrounds the artwork as well. On the eastern wall of the atrium, facing the main archway on Seventh Avenue, is a Lichtenstein artwork, Mural with Blue Brushstroke, which measures 68 by 32 feet (20.7 by 9.8 m). Lichtenstein had painted the mural on-site in 1986.

A pair of parallel passageways leads east from the atrium to the galleria, each originally decorated with a separate artwork. Thomas Hart Benton's America Today murals, commissioned in 1931, were originally installed in the northern passageway, around the elevator core. The Benton murals were originally installed in the New School for Social Research, and Equitable had acquired the Benton murals in 1984 for a reported $3.1 million. The murals were relocated to 1290 Sixth Avenue in the mid-1990s. The southern passageway of the lobby has a niche, which contains Paul Manship's sculpture Day. Manship had crafted Day in 1938 as part of a set of four bronze works called The Moods of Time.

==== Retail and restaurants ====
A branch of the Whitney Museum of American Art occupied space in two storefront galleries from 1986 to 1992. There was a north gallery for permanent works and a south gallery for temporary exhibitions. The Equitable Tower location, the largest of the Whitney's four branches at the time, occupied 3,000 square feet (280 m^{2}) in each gallery. As part of the arrangement, Equitable gave money to the Whitney and paid the branch's operating expenses for six years. After the Whitney branch closed, its space became the Equitable Gallery. Another tenant was the Cathedral of St. John the Divine, which operated two stores with souvenirs from the city's museums. The Urbanspace food hall has also operated at ground level since 2020.

From the building's opening in early 1986, Equitable officials wanted to operate what Newsday described as "nothing but the best of restaurants". Initially, there was an Italian restaurant called Palio and a French restaurant called Le Bernardin. Palio's ground-floor bar measured 30 by 30 feet (9.1 by 9.1 m), with a 24-foot-tall (7.3 m) ceiling, and its second floor contained a dining room. The former bar room's walls still contain a mural by Sandro Chia entitled Palio, which depicts the Palio di Siena horse race. Le Bernardin, a Michelin-starred restaurant, occupies a less architecturally elaborate space, originally decorated with velvet upholstery. A third restaurant, the American grill Sam's Restaurant, opened in late 1987. While Le Bernardin continued to operate in the building in the 2010s, the old Palio space has operated as the Aldo Sohm Wine Bar since 2014. Meanwhile, Sam's was replaced by Judson Grill and then Bar Americain.

==== Other stories ====
The building has 31 passenger elevators, as well as three freight elevators and two vehicular elevators. Twenty-six of the passenger elevators lead from the lobby to the upper floors. Four of these elevators run from the lobby to floors 2 through 9; eight elevators serve floors 9 through 23; six elevators serve floors 23 through 33; and eight elevators serve floors 34 through 50. There are also two elevators in the annex, serving the lobby through floor 8; another elevator connecting the lobby to the subcellar; and two elevators connecting the Axa Equitable auditorium to the lobby.

A broadcast studio and auditorium were also designed for the building. The Equitable auditorium has 487, 495, or 500 seats, accessed from a staircase from the atrium. The auditorium has been used for several major corporate events, including the announcement of a merger between IBM and Lotus Development, as well as the merger announcement of Kimberly-Clark and Scott Paper Company. It has also been used for musical performances, such as a jazz performance by Roy Nathanson in 1990, and for film premieres, such as for the film The Housemaid in 2025.

Equitable officials had their own private bathrooms as well as Chippendale furniture. The 49th and 50th floors comprised Equitable's executive suite and were connected by a stair. The 49th floor was designed with 14 dining rooms, each with works from a different artists. The dining rooms range from a small accommodation, with one table and four chairs, to a dining hall with a baby grand piano, sofas, and a fireplace. There were two executive rooms at the 50th story: one facing east and the other facing west. The rooms had classical-inspired moldings, large woodwork, and custom furnishings designed by Kohn Pedersen Fox Conway. The western room, which served as Equitable's main boardroom, was originally designed with a green carpet with a large circular table. The eastern room had Equitable's main dining room and contained Triptych, a trio of landscapes by Brad Davis.

== History ==
Equitable Holdings (originally the Equitable Life Assurance Society) had constructed several structures in New York City since the late 19th century, as well as several across the United States. The first New York City office was the Equitable Life Building on 120 Broadway in Lower Manhattan, completed in 1870. The Equitable Life Building was destroyed by a fire in 1912 and replaced by the current Equitable Building at 120 Broadway. Equitable Life moved to 393 Seventh Avenue (now 11 Penn Plaza) in 1924, and it moved to 1281 Sixth Avenue in 1961. Equitable had occupied all 1.8 million square feet (170,000 m^{2}) in its Sixth Avenue building for over twenty years. However, by the 1980s, it was looking to move decentralize its New York City office. The company split into four major divisions, of which only one, Equitable Capital, remained in the Sixth Avenue building. At the time, office space in Midtown Manhattan was in high demand and Equitable felt it could lease its Sixth Avenue building at a great profit.

=== Development ===
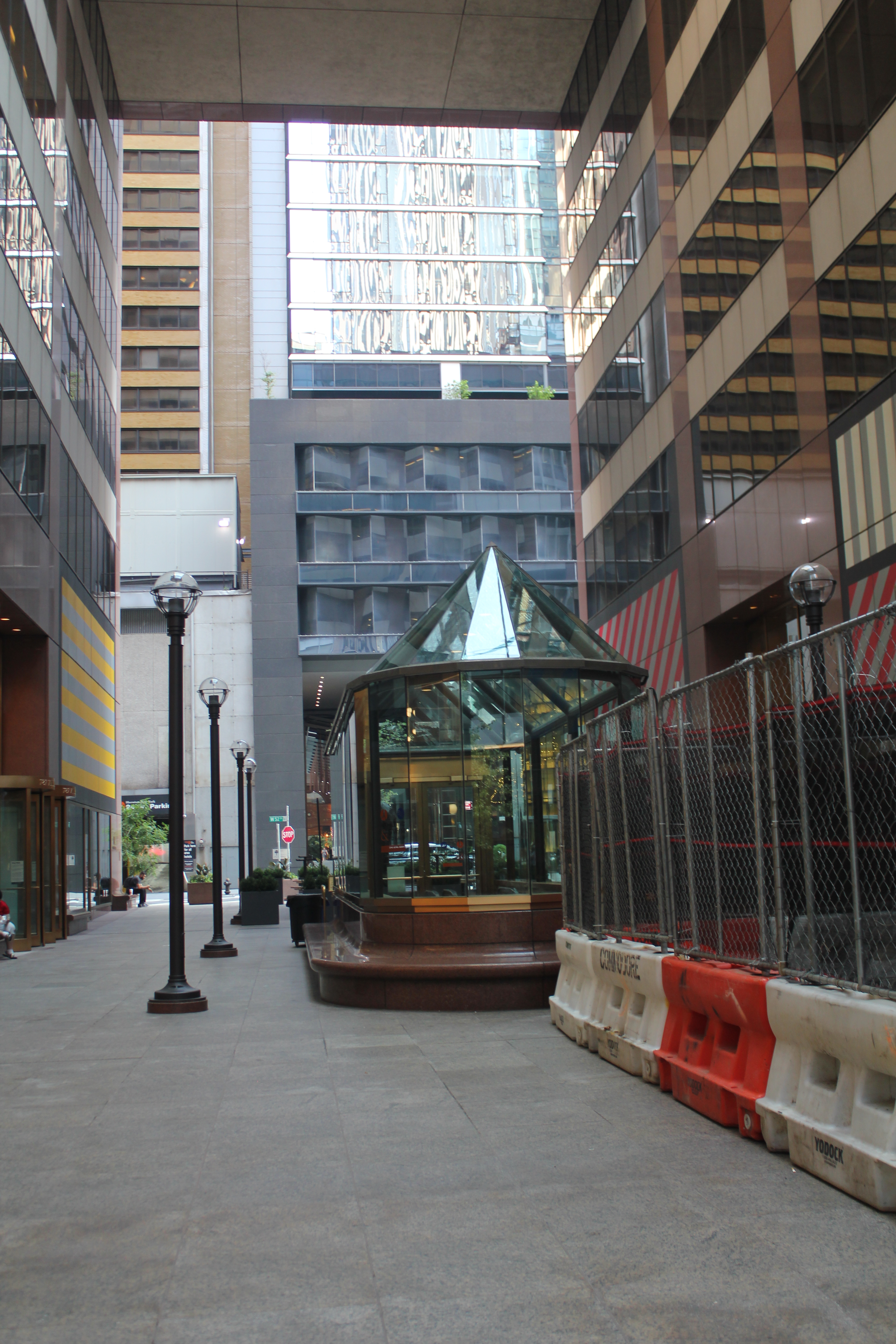
Interior of midblock galleria

After considering relocating elsewhere in the United States, Equitable planned to expand its Sixth Avenue headquarters by 1980. Over the next year, it acquired an adjacent L-shaped site extending to Seventh Avenue, measuring 67,000 square feet (6,200 m^{2}). Except for a small plot on the corner of Seventh Avenue and 52nd Street, Equitable had control of the entire city block. Equitable first announced its intention, in March 1981, to construct a tower on the newly acquired Seventh Avenue site. Demolition of existing buildings, such as the Victoria and Abbey hotels, began soon after. General contractor Turner Construction performed the demolitions manually, even though it had the city government's permission to use dynamite, since it wished to minimize disruption to neighboring structures. During one demolition in 1982, a steel beam fell through the roof of a nearby deli.

Equitable's board officially approved plans in February 1983 to move its headquarters to a Seventh Avenue building. Edward Larrabee Barnes was hired as the architect. Equitable's new tower was one of several high-rise developments planned for the area at the time, in spite of a slight decline in New York City's office market. Equitable planned to sell its Sixth Avenue headquarters to get a tax deduction on the new building. The old Sixth Avenue structure would be partially occupied by Paine Webber. Equitable officials were not worried about the fact that Seventh Avenue was not a prestigious executive address. This was a contrast to two decades earlier, when officials had thought Sixth Avenue was "more like Speakeasy Row than Corporate Corridor".

While much of the building was to be completed by 1985, the section at the corner of Seventh Avenue and 52nd Street was occupied by an eight-story building and would be delayed. Construction of Equitable Tower had to be closely coordinated to avoid delays or disruptions, since even a one-month delay in completion would cost Equitable $6 million in rent and $3 million in construction loans. Work was complicated by the fact that traffic on the neighboring streets could not be disrupted during construction. On two sides of the construction site, there was only 10 to 12 feet (3.0 to 3.7 m) of space within which builders could work, and there was no space for materials to be stored on site. Equitable president John B. Carter announced in May 1985 that a series of artworks would be commissioned for the building. During construction that July, a construction hoist fell from Equitable Tower and killed two workers.

=== Opening and early years ===
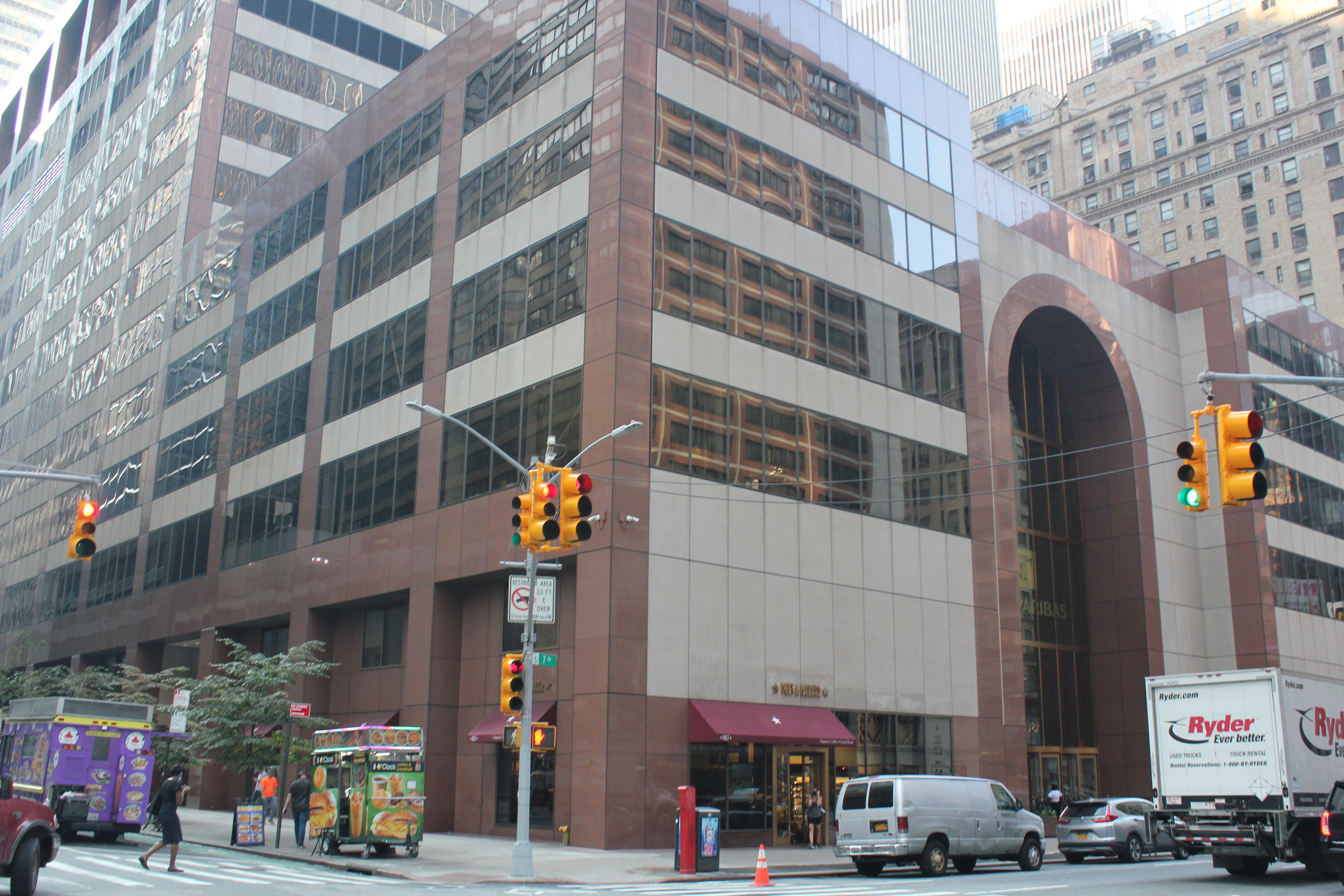
Northwest corner of the building, seen from 52nd Street and Seventh Avenue

By early 1986, Equitable had finished the atrium, galleria, plazas, and lobby, as well as a branch of the Whitney Museum. The company had taken the top third of the building and expected to rent out the remaining stories at a rate of $40 to $50 per square foot ($430 to $540/m^{2}), a higher rate than at nearby office buildings. At the time, there were few tenants for the west tower's vacant space, and Equitable was marketing both the west and east towers as part of the same complex. The building ultimately cost $200 million to construct. A public preview of the new tower's boardrooms took place on February 1, 1986, as part of a benefit event for the Center for Arts Information. The Whitney branch opened on February 11, 1986. Douglas McGill of The New York Times called the Whitney branch the "latest and largest addition to an extensive collaboration between a major art museum and the corporate world."

The building was technically owned by Equitable Real Estate Investment Management, which leased space to Equitable for its own corporate offices. Within a year of Equitable Tower's opening, eighty percent of the space had been leased. Among the tenants were arts organizations American Council for the Arts, Center for Arts Information, and Volunteer Lawyers for the Arts, which were offered below-market-rate rents. In addition, accounting firm Ernst & Whinney (later Ernst & Young) took space in the tower. By October 1987, when Black Monday occurred, Equitable Tower was fully leased despite charging higher rents per square foot than other buildings in the area. The American grill Sam's Restaurant opened at ground level at the end of that year.

=== 1990s and 2000s ===
By 1990, Equitable was in the process of being acquired by the French company Axa. Within two years, Equitable had gone public and downsized most of its employees, leaving only 2,200 working at 787 Seventh Avenue. The company was considering leaving for the suburbs, given the high costs of occupying office space in midtown, but ultimately decided against it. The Whitney branch in Equitable Tower closed in 1992, when its original agreement expired, and it was replaced by an art gallery called the Equitable Gallery. Sam's Restaurant closed the next year, being replaced by another American grill, Judson Grill, in early 1994.

Equitable only occupied ten percent of 787 Seventh Avenue by early 1995, when it placed 300,000 square feet (28,000 m^{2}) of space for lease. That year, Equitable announced it would be moving one block east to 1290 Sixth Avenue, with only the highest-ranking executives remaining at 787 Seventh Avenue. Much of Equitable's space at 787 Seventh Avenue was taken by law firm Willkie Farr & Gallagher, and the floor just below the penthouse was occupied by Paramount Capital. With Equitable's relocation, the America Today murals were moved to 1290 Sixth Avenue. In the late 1990s, David Emil planned to open a restaurant called Night Sky on the 50th floor, but it was canceled after Equitable wished to lease that floor as offices. The 1997 chess match of Deep Blue versus Garry Kasparov, in which IBM supercomputer Deep Blue defeated world chess champion Garry Kasparov, took place at Equitable Center as well.

By 2000, the building's tenants included Bank One, BNP Paribas, Hicks Muse, and Willkie Farr & Gallagher. About a third of the total space, 500,000 square feet (46,000 m^{2}), was set to become available for lease in 2002 when Ernst & Young's lease expired. Much of Ernst & Young's space was taken in 2001 by law firm Sidley Austin, which had to renovate 11 floors within two months after its old World Trade Center offices were destroyed in the September 11 attacks. Another lessee that had been displaced from the World Trade Center was investment banking firm Keefe, Bruyette & Woods, which borrowed space from BNP Paribas and Wachtell, Lipton, Rosen & Katz before leasing its own fourth-floor space. The Palio restaurant closed in 2002, and Judson Grill closed two years later; the latter was replaced by Bar Americain. Citigroup leased a major block of space, covering 250,000 square feet (23,000 m^{2}), in late 2005, including the 50th-floor penthouse. Other tenants in the 2000s included investment manager New Mountain Capital as well as IT company SAS Institute.

=== 2010s to present ===
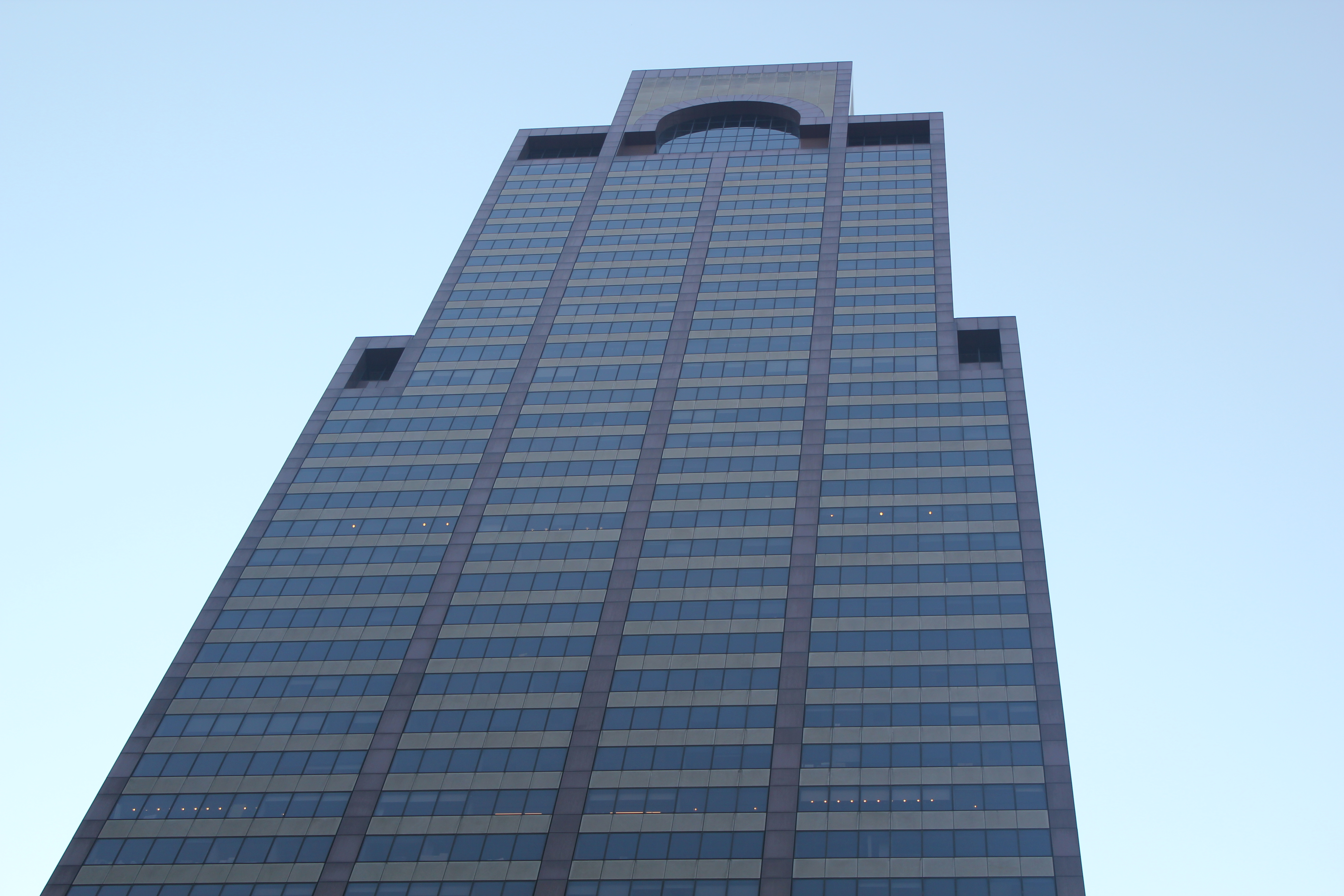
Upper stories as viewed from street level

Palio's space became part of Piano Due, which closed in 2011 and was replaced by the Aldo Sohm Wine Bar in 2014. Axa Equitable placed 787 Seventh Avenue and 1285 Sixth Avenue for sale in August 2015. At the time, 787 Seventh Avenue was almost completely occupied, with only 1.6 percent of the space vacant. By the end of the year, the California Public Employees' Retirement System (CalPERS) had shown interest in acquiring 787 Seventh Avenue for $1.9 billion. This would make Axa Equitable Center one of the most expensive single buildings to ever be sold in New York City. In February 2016, CalPERS announced it had purchased the building. The purchase was financed with a $780 million mortgage from Deutsche Bank.

Bar Americain, at the building's ground floor, closed in 2018. A helicopter crashed on Axa Equitable Center's roof on June 10, 2019, killing the pilot and sparking a fire that prompted the building's evacuation. No one else was hurt in the crash, and the helicopter's wreckage was removed. The Urbanspace food hall opened at the ground level of Axa Equitable Center in early 2020. In 2022, following the COVID-19 pandemic in New York City, BNP Paribas renovated its offices at 787 Seventh Avenue to encourage workers to return to the firm's physical offices. In addition, a sign with the name "BNP Paribas" was installed above the Seventh Avenue entrance, replacing Equitable's name. Although 787 Seventh Avenue had an occupancy rate of 96 percent by early 2024, its value had declined by $123 million since the pandemic; at the time, the building was estimated to be worth $917 million. The reduced valuation reflected the fact that BNP Paribas had downsized its space at the building from 450,000 to 300,000 square feet (42,000 to 28,000 m^{2}), while the lease of another major tenant, UBS, was scheduled to expire in 2026.

== Tenants ==
As of 2024, several financial and law firms occupy the space, including:

- BNP Paribas, banking group
- Citigroup, investment bank
- Sidley Austin, law firm
- Stifel, investment bank
- UBS, investment bank
- Willkie Farr & Gallagher, law firm

== Impact ==
=== Reception ===
The design of Equitable Tower was largely criticized upon its completion. Paul Goldberger called the building "54 stories of ambivalence", saying it "adds almost no grace to the skyline". Progressive Architecture was similarly critical of the "undistinguished quality" of the facade, saying: "Barnes's tower can't seem to make up its mind whether it's a Modern skyscraper or a Post-Modern one", Roger Kimball of The New Criterion wrote: "Mr. Barnes seems to have abandoned any attempt at a cogent architectural design. Instead, he has contrived to produce one of the most pretentious and ungainly new buildings in New York." The New Criterion cited Equitable Tower's "large clunky base", its "replaceable"-looking granite and limestone facade, and its massive arches that "seem more like movie-set novelties" as flaws in the design. Suzanne Stephens said the criticism showed that Barnes was "more adept at chipping, chamfering and chiseling buildings with rotated geometries". By contrast, architectural writer Donald M. Reynolds said the building was "one of the largest and most comprehensive collaborations of architecture, urban planning, and public art since Rockefeller Center".

The artwork was received more positively by architectural and art critics. The New York Times reported that the artwork was a "statement of [Equitable's] belief not only in the commercial and promotional value of art, but also in the role art can play in the quality of corporate and communal life". Progressive Architecture characterized the collection as "one of the more successful corporate art programs to come along in some time", as opposed to the "resolutely ho-hum" character of much of Equitable Tower. Phaidon Press wrote of the art collection: "AXA Equitable Life Insurance wished to project a positive image of itself to New Yorkers—as progressive, leading edge and civic-minded, as demonstrated by this indisputable gift to the city." Conversely, The New Criterion wrote that the collection was "not art but money", in that it was a showcase of Equitable's wealth rather than a display of art for its own sake. Goldberger thought that, even with the art and public spaces, the building "lacks a kind of freshness, as if everyone involved in this project were doing it by rote".

=== Influence on other developments ===
Equitable was the first major company to erect a headquarters on Seventh Avenue in Midtown. At the time of its completion, the building was the only major office structure on Seventh Avenue. This led Architectural Record to say: "Equitable Life Assurance Society has heeded Horace Greeley's dictum, 'Go West', though not, to be sure, very far west." According to Reynolds, the building's construction encouraged office development to move west from Sixth to Seventh Avenue, just as the construction of Rockefeller Center had encouraged a similar westward movement from Fifth to Sixth Avenue.

Architectural Record described the building as having been proposed "amidst a swirl of controversy over what some see as an over-concentration of new skyscraper construction in Manhattan's crowded midtown". Nonetheless, the development of Equitable Tower directly improved the character of the surrounding area, particularly the Midtown portion of Seventh Avenue, in the mid-1980s. Following the tower's construction, William Zeckendorf developed the nearby One Worldwide Plaza to improve the character of Eighth Avenue. Though developers praised the development boom that followed Equitable Tower's construction, civic organizations worried that theaters north of Times Square would be quickly replaced by offices.

== See also ==
- Tallest buildings in New York City
- List of tallest buildings in the United States
