= Portrait of Ramsay MacDonald =

Painting by Solomon Joseph Solomon

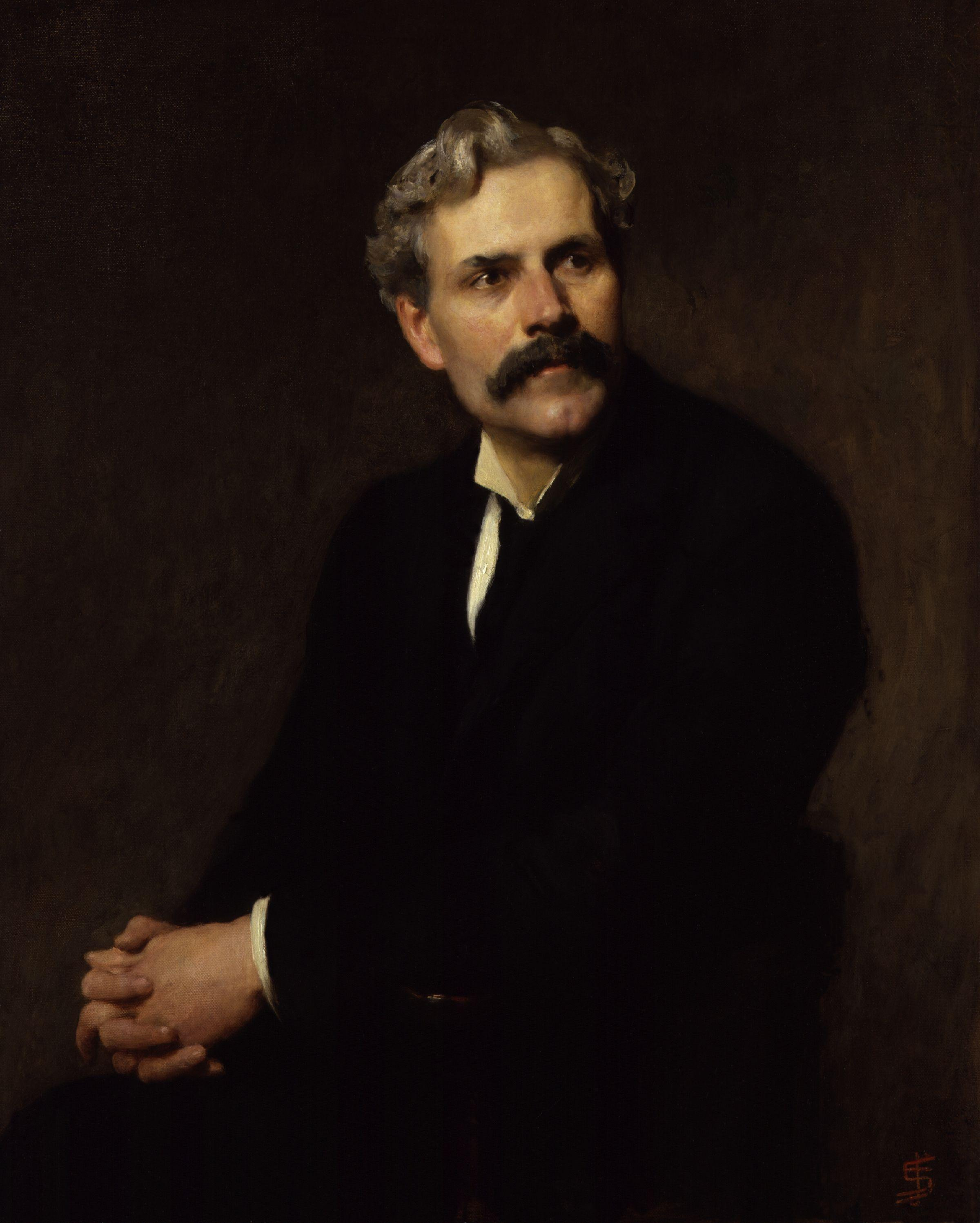
- Artist: Solomon Joseph Solomon
- Year: 1911
- Type: Oil on canvas, portrait painting
- Dimensions: 90.2 cm × 72.4 cm (35.5 in × 28.5 in)
- Location: National Portrait Gallery, London

Portrait of Ramsay MacDonald is a 1911 portrait painting by the British artist Solomon Joseph Solomon. It depicts the Scottish politician Ramsay MacDonald. A prominent figure during the early years of the LabourParty, MacDonald served as Prime Minister of the United Kingdom twice - initially as head of the first ever Labour government in 1924 and again from 1929 to 1935 when he ended up as the figurehead of the National Government tacking the effects of the Great Depression.

Solomon was a fashionable portraitist of the Edwardian era who later worked as a notable designer of military camouflage during the First World War. He was the second Jewish member elected to the Royal Academy of Arts following Solomon Hart.

Solomon displayed the work at the Royal Academy Exhibition of 1912 held at Burlington House in London. Today the painting is part of the collection of the National Portrait Gallery, having been acquired in 1953 when it was given by the sitter's daughter Ishbel.

== Bibliography ==
- Comay, Joan. Who's Who in Jewish History Taylor & Francis, 2023.
- Saywell, David & Simon, Jacob. National Portrait Gallery: Complete Illustrated Catalogue. National Portrait Gallery, 2004.
