= Maurice Tuchman =

American curator (born 1936)

- Born: November 30, 1936 (age 89); Jacksonville, Florida, U.S.
- Citizenship: American
- Education: City University of New York (BA); Columbia University (PhD)
- Occupation: Curator
- Employer: Los Angeles County Museum of Art

Maurice Tuchman (born November 30, 1936) is an American curator. He worked as the first curator of twentieth century art at Los Angeles County Museum of Art (LACMA), where he organized several notable exhibitions.

== Early life and education ==
Maurice Tuchman was born in Jacksonville, Florida, though he was raised in a Jewish neighborhood of the Bronx. Tuchman attended the City University of New York as an undergraduate, and completed a PhD in Art History at Columbia University.

== Career ==
After graduation, Tuchman worked as a curator at the Guggenheim Museum in New York. In 1964, he became the first curator of twentieth century art at LACMA. Among his projects was LACMA's experimental Art and Technology program which presented emerging Light and Space artists Robert Irwin and James Turrell. His other notable exhibitions include The Spiritual in Art: Abstract Painting 1890–1985 (1986), and Parallel Visions: Modern Artists and Outsider Art (1992); the former was the first large-format show to include Swedish painter Hilma af Klint 42 years after her death.

In 1985, Tuchman was part of the international jury that awarded the Carnegie Prize to Anselm Kiefer and Richard Serra.

In 1993, after having been the museum's senior curator for 20th-century art for 27 years, Tuchman filed a lawsuit against the museum's director Michael E. Shapiro and its trustees in Los Angeles County Superior Court, seeking damages and reinstatement in his job. Tuchman said he had been demoted, with no warning, when a memo from Shapiro informed him that his job would be the newly created post of senior curator of 20th-century drawings. He was reinstated in an out-of-court settlement that same year and became senior curator emeritus in late 1994.

Along with fellow art historian Esti Dunow, Tuchman is co-author of the Chaïm Soutine catalogue raisonné. Tuchman and Dunow also coordinated "The New Landscape/The New Still Life: Soutine and Modern Art” at Cheim & Read in New York in 2006 and "“Soutine/Bacon" at Helly Nahmad Gallery in New York in 2011.

Tuchman's work as a curator has been criticized for under-representing the work of minority and women artists.
