= Stephen McKenna (artist) =

English painter

- Born: 20 March 1939; Ashford, Middlesex, England, U.K.
- Died: 4 May 2017 (aged 78); County Carlow, Ireland
- Other name: SMCK
- Occupation: Visual artist
- Known for: Postmodern, figurative painting
- Notable work: Tate, British Council, Imperial War Museum

Stephen McKenna (sometimes signed as SMCK) (20 March 1939 – 4 May 2017) was a British-born visual artist known for his postmodern figurative paintings. He was shortlisted for the Turner Prize in 1986. His works are held in the collections of the Tate Galleries, the British Council, and the Imperial War Museum, London, and have been shown at various galleries, including the Royal Hibernian Academy, Dublin, and the Irish Museum of Modern Art. He was a member of the Royal Hibernian Academy.

== Life ==
McKenna was born in London, where he studied at the Slade School of Art (affiliated to University College London). In 1973 he moved to Donegal, Ireland. He also lived in Belgium, Germany, and Italy. He was a guest professor at the Hochschule für Bildende Künste Braunschweig (Brunswick, Germany) from 1995 to 1996. In 1997 he curated the exhibition The Pursuit of Painting at the Irish Museum of Modern Art. He became an associate member of the RHA in 2001 and a full member in 2002, and was president of the academy from 2005 to 2009.

He died in his home in County Carlow on 4 May 2017.

== Notable works ==
O, Ilium! (1982) is an example of postmodern pastiche, combining imagery from classical art and sculpture, Max Ernst, Constantin Brâncuși, and archaic Greek pottery. According to Ingeborg Hoesterey, it throws together images from the cultural memory of western civilisation, showing them to constitute only a "wasteland".

== Exhibitions ==
Solo exhibitions of his work include:

- Museum of Modern Art, Oxford (1983)
- Van Abbemuseum, Eindhoven (1983)
- Stephen McKenna Paintings 1985–1993, Irish Museum of Modern Art, Dublin (1993)

Group and recent posthumous exhibitions include:

- Salon, Lismore Castle Arts, County Waterford, curated by Matthew Higgs (2026)
- Outside, Karma, New York, curated by Matthew Higgs (2026)
- Thinking of somewhere else, The Approach, London (2026)
