= Ilona Harima =

Finnish artist (1911–1986)

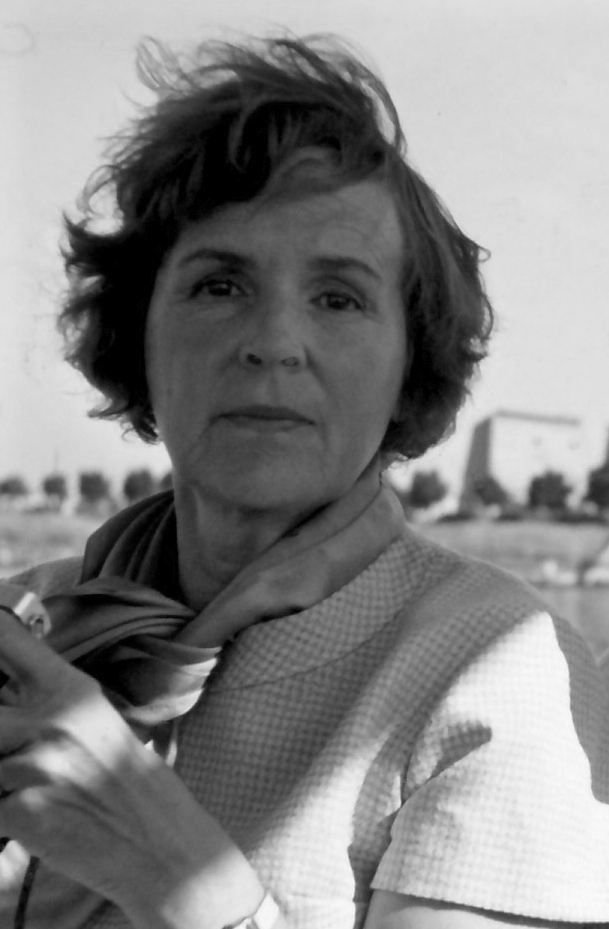
- Ilona Harima (Ilona Rautiala) 1966
- Born: 4 March 1911; Vaasa, Grand Duchy of Finland
- Died: 9 June 1986 (aged 75); Helsinki, Finland
- Known for: Painter
- Spouse: Erkki Rautiala

Ilona Harima (4 March 1911 – 9 June 1986) was a Finnish artist whose paintings expressed deep oriental spirituality. Her style was strongly influenced by Buddhism and Hinduism but not similar to Asian art. Harima developed a personal style very different from the mainstream movements of that era between the world wars.

== Early life and education ==
Harima was born in the town of Vaasa on the west coast of Finland and spent her early childhood there. Her father, Samuli Hohenthal, was a prominent Finnish businessman and her mother, Anna, née Björklund, came from a Finnish priestly family. In 1936, the couple changed their surname to Harima. They had two children, son Jorma and daughter Ilona, who was three years younger. The family moved to Helsinki, southern Finland, when Ilona was seven. She graduated from middle school at the age of fifteen. To study art was important to her and Harima enrolled in the graphics department of the Central School of Applied Arts in Helsinki in 1927.

== Career ==
Harima's main interests were elsewhere and she interrupted her graphics studies after about two years. She worked for a while at an advertising agency but soon continued to pursue a free artistic career, a very personal path of her own. Already at an early age she was deeply interested in Asian culture and Asian art. Especially India and Tibet were near to her heart. In her youth she made a study trip to Paris and another one to Italy, taking care to seek also oriental art collections. Later an exhibition trip to New Delhi was planned but could not be realized and India stayed out of her reach permanently. Gradually spirituality began to interest her more deeply. She became a member of the Theosophical Society in Finland in 1936.

Ilona Harima painted mostly small-scale detailed works in gouache and watercolour on paper and parchment often mounted on old brocades. She did some larger oil paintings also. Harima was unique in the Finnish art world in showing very openly her spiritual personality through her paintings. Divine figures and angels, enlightened humans but also suffering and compassionate individuals are the main subjects of Harima's works. This kind of subject matter is most exceptional in Finnish art. She also drew landscapes as well as detailed studies of plants inspired by the surroundings of the family's summer villa. Animals were dear to her and especially birds appear in many of her works. Her paintings are full of Oriental spirituality with symbols like flames, sunbeams, sun discs, heavenly eyes and blooming lotus flowers as well as water symbols and celestial bodies. She kept on painting for three decades. There are also a few small bronze sculptures from her.

Harima seldom exhibited her works and was not very keen in selling them. She was not obliged to earn a living by painting. In her paintings she was contemplating her own inner world and usually gave them as gifts to friends and relatives. Her first small exhibition in Galleria Strindberg, Helsinki, in 1934 received much attention. Correspondence from those times has survived, amongst others from the Swedish pioneer in abstract art, Hilma af Klint. She had noticed kinship with the works of this young Finnish painter, urged her to study Rudolf Steiner and was interested in meeting her to discuss spiritual matters. Harima exhibited anew in 1946 and 1960, also at Strindberg's. The Finnish National Gallery Ateneum presented a small but informative selection of her works in 2011-2012 commemorating the hundredth anniversary of her birth.

== Personal life ==
Ilona Harima met the like-minded young architect Erkki Rautiala in theosophical circles. They were married in August 1939, just a few months before the Winter War affected the life of everyone in Finland. Only some weeks after returning from their camping honeymoon in northern Lapland, her husband had to leave for the front. From the wedding on she used her married surname Rautiala but kept Ilona Harima as her artist name. Their only child, a daughter, was born in 1941.They lived permanently in Helsinki spending summers at the family villa in the nearby archipelago by the sea. In the sixties the family travelled to interesting destinations such as Cyprus, Israel and Egypt but never further to Asia proper. Although being above all a painter Harima also wrote essays, aphorisms and some poems but was not interested in assembling them. She also read much and especially books on Eastern philosophies were important to her.

=== Death ===
Harima died on 9 June 1986 in Helsinki, at the age of 75.

== Collections ==
Ilona Harima's paintings can be found in the following Finnish museums and galleries:

- Finnish National Gallery Ateneum, Helsinki
- Signe and Ane Gyllenberg Foundation, Helsinki
- Gösta Serlachius Fine Arts Foundation, Mänttä
- The Tikanoja Art Museum, Vaasa

== Sources ==
- Ilona Harima valaistumisen tiellä [Ilona Harima - the road to enlightenment]. Edited by Helena Hätönen and Riitta Ojanperä. Helsinki Finnish National Gallery. Kuvataiteen keskusarkisto [Central Art Archives] 23 (2011). 61 p. ISBN 978-951-53-3392-6. Exhibit - publication. In Finnish with summary in English on pages 58–60. Wholetext incl. illustrations, see external link.
- Kokkinen, Nina (2020). "Ilona Harima and Mediumistic Art". In Kokkinen, Nina (ed.). Spiritual Treasures: Esotericism in the Finnish Art World 1899-1959. Helsinki: Parvs. pp. 92–99. ISBN 978-9527226544.
- Konttinen, Riitta 2008, Naistaiteilijat Suomessa keskiajalta modernismin murrokseen [Women artists in Finland from the Middle Ages to the breakthrough of modernism]. 479 p. Helsinki Tammi. ISBN 978-951-31-4105-9. In Finnish.
