= John Raimondi =

American sculptor (born 1948)

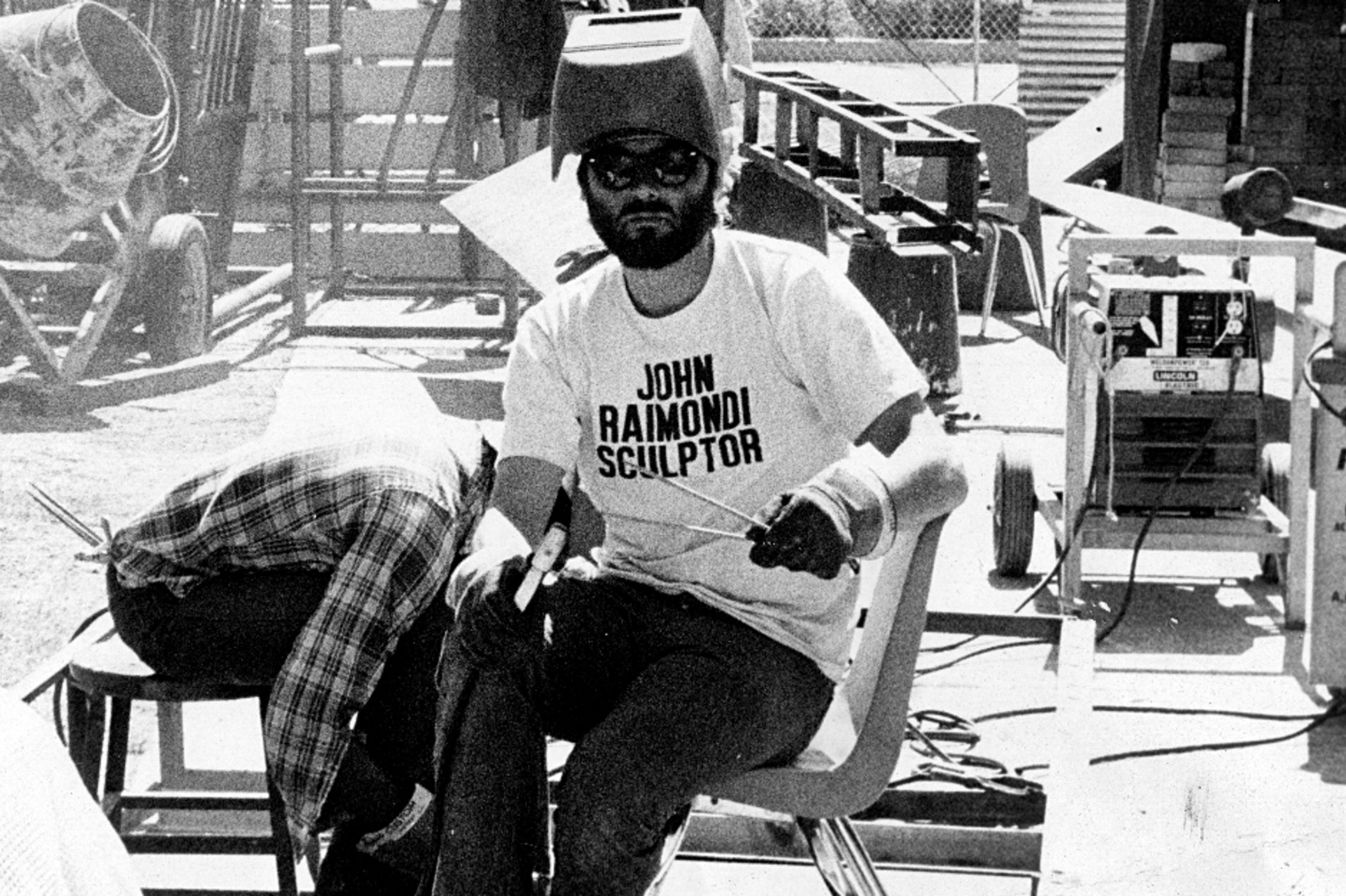
- Sculptor John Raimondi welding one of his early sculptures.
- Born: John Raimondi; May 29, 1948 (age 78); Chelsea, Massachusetts
- Education: Massachusetts College of Art
- Known for: Abstract Sculptor

John Raimondi (born May 1948) is an American sculptor best known as a creator of monumental public sculpture, with works throughout the United States and several European countries. He lives and works in Palm Beach Gardens, Florida.

== Biography ==
The first of four sons born to Erma and Peter Raimondi, John Raimondi was born in Chelsea, Massachusetts in May 1948.

Originally intending to become a seascape painter, Raimondi first attended Vesper George School of Art and subsequently attended the Portland School of Fine and Applied Arts in Maine (now Maine College of Art). There he met teacher and sculptor Norman Therrien who encouraged Raimondi to try sculpture. Next, Raimondi attended the Massachusetts College of Art where he studied sculpture and graduated in 1973. He exhibited early works at Boston City Hall, Bridgewater State University, and numerous local galleries and museums. This led to Raimondi's first prominent commission, awarded to him in a national competition conducted by the I-80 Bicentennial Sculpture Project, in Nebraska. This sculpture, entitled Erma's Desire, is named for the artist's mother and her intense desire for the happiness of her children. Located in Grand Island, Nebraska, the work was considered controversial due to its suggestive title and abstract form. It was debated in several major publications and on the TV news program "60 Minutes". Since then, Raimondi has completed more than 100 monumental sculptures for public, corporate, and private collections worldwide.

He currently resides in Palm Beach Gardens, Florida.

== Art forgery suit ==
Raimondi has sued billionaire Igor Olenicoff for art forgery. In a similar case, Olenicoff and his real estate company, Olen Properties Corp., were found guilty of copyright infringement by a federal jury in 2014 and ordered to pay $450,000 in damages to sculptor Don Wakefield, for art forgery. Raimondi had been contacted by the real estate tycoon to create versions of two of his extant sculptures as part of a percent for art mandate for property developers. Raimondi had supplied Olenicoff with detailed drawings and photographs of the proposed works, which Olenicof subsequently canceled. In 2015, Olenicoff was ordered to pay Raimondi $650,000, according to a Benjamin Sutton article in Hyperallergic.com.

If Olenicoff had followed through with commissioning the works, Raimondi would have made $250,000 for each of the four proposed pieces. In 2010, Raimondi was informed that sculptures that originally had been submitted to the city of Brea, California as his works were now attributed to a Chinese forger. Raimondi had never authorized the creation or display of the sculptures he had discussed with Olenicoff.

== Gallery ==
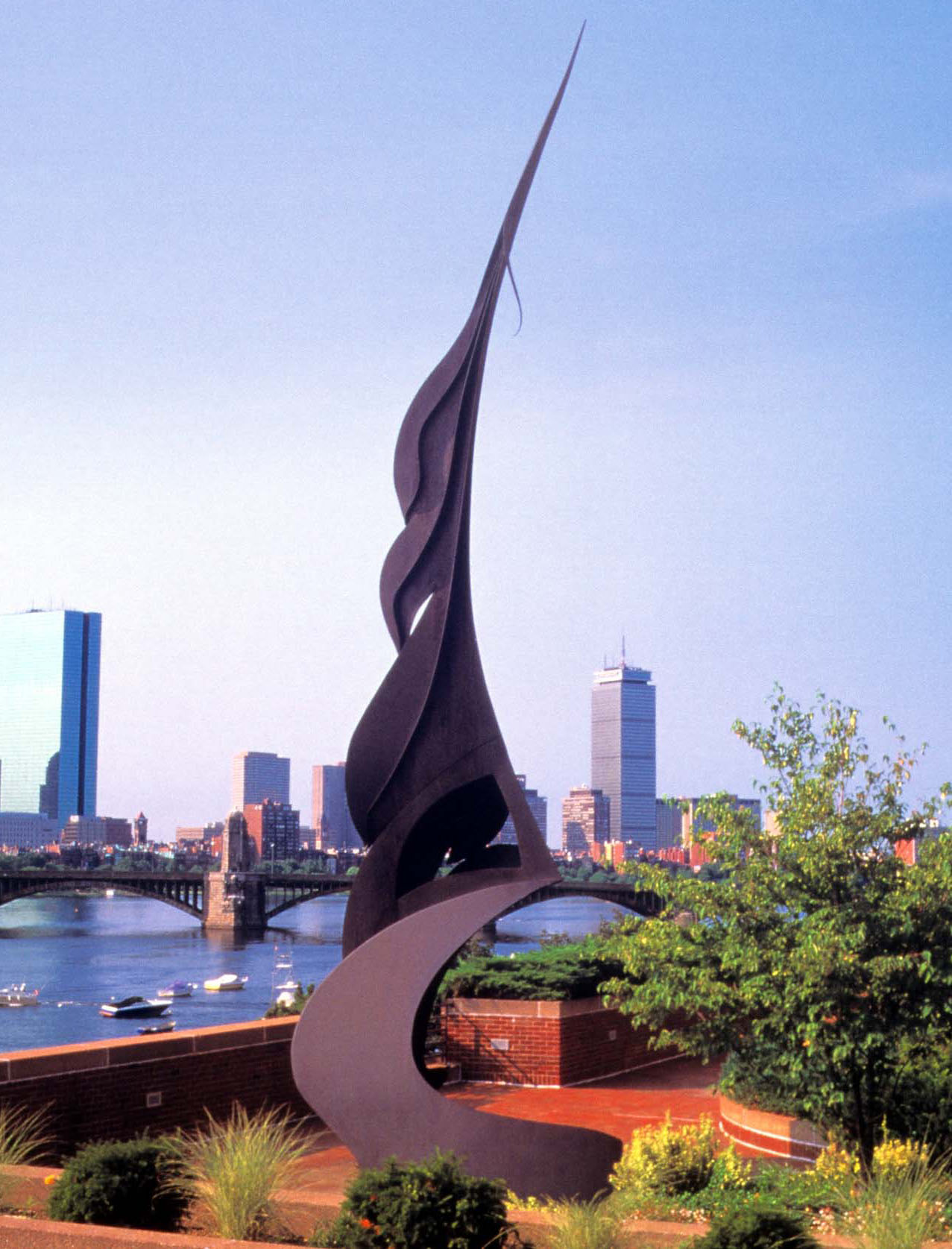
Lupus (1985), 40' Tall, Cor-Ten Steel.

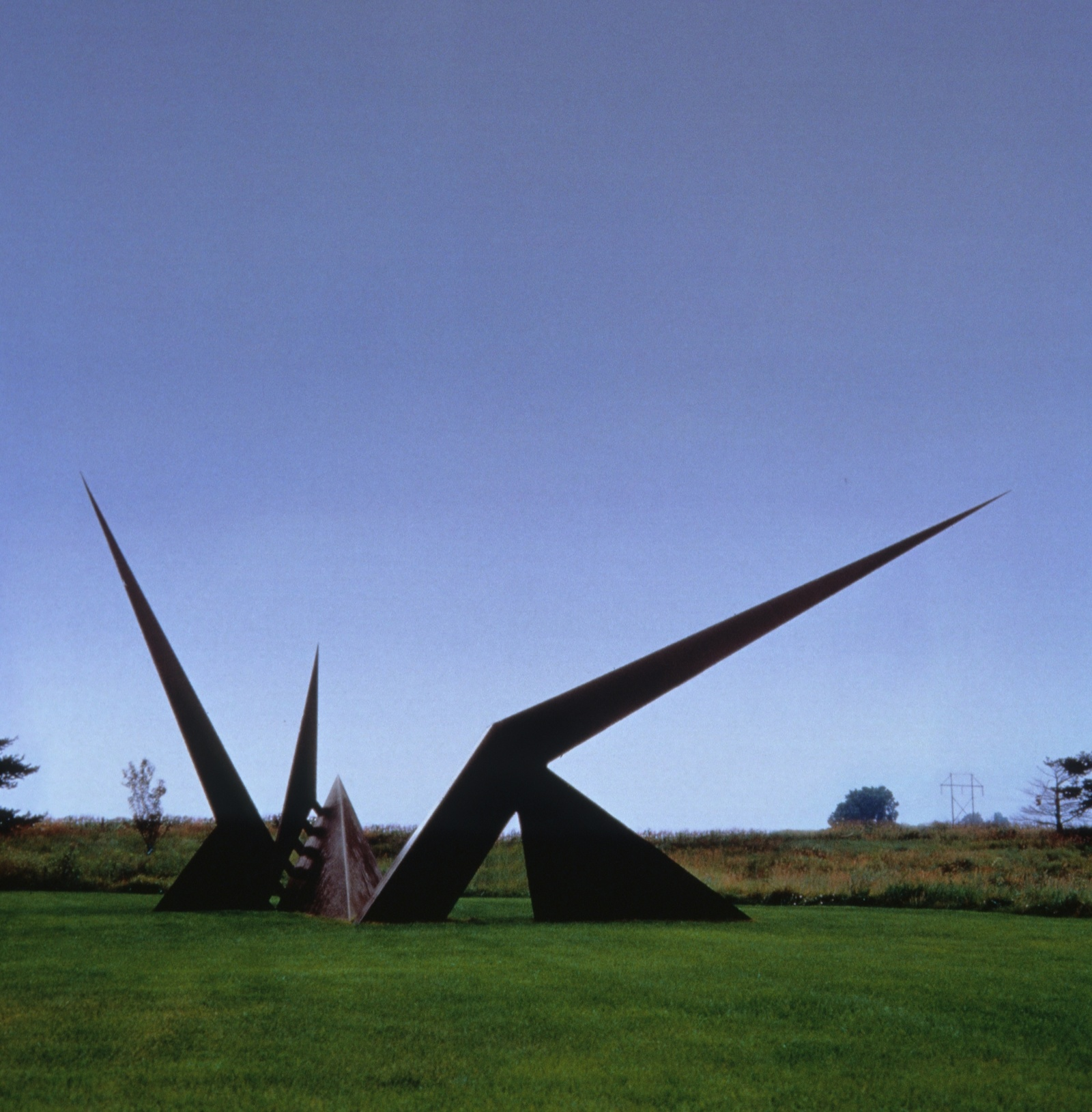
Erma's Desire (1976), 26' x 47' x 33', Cor-Ten Steel.

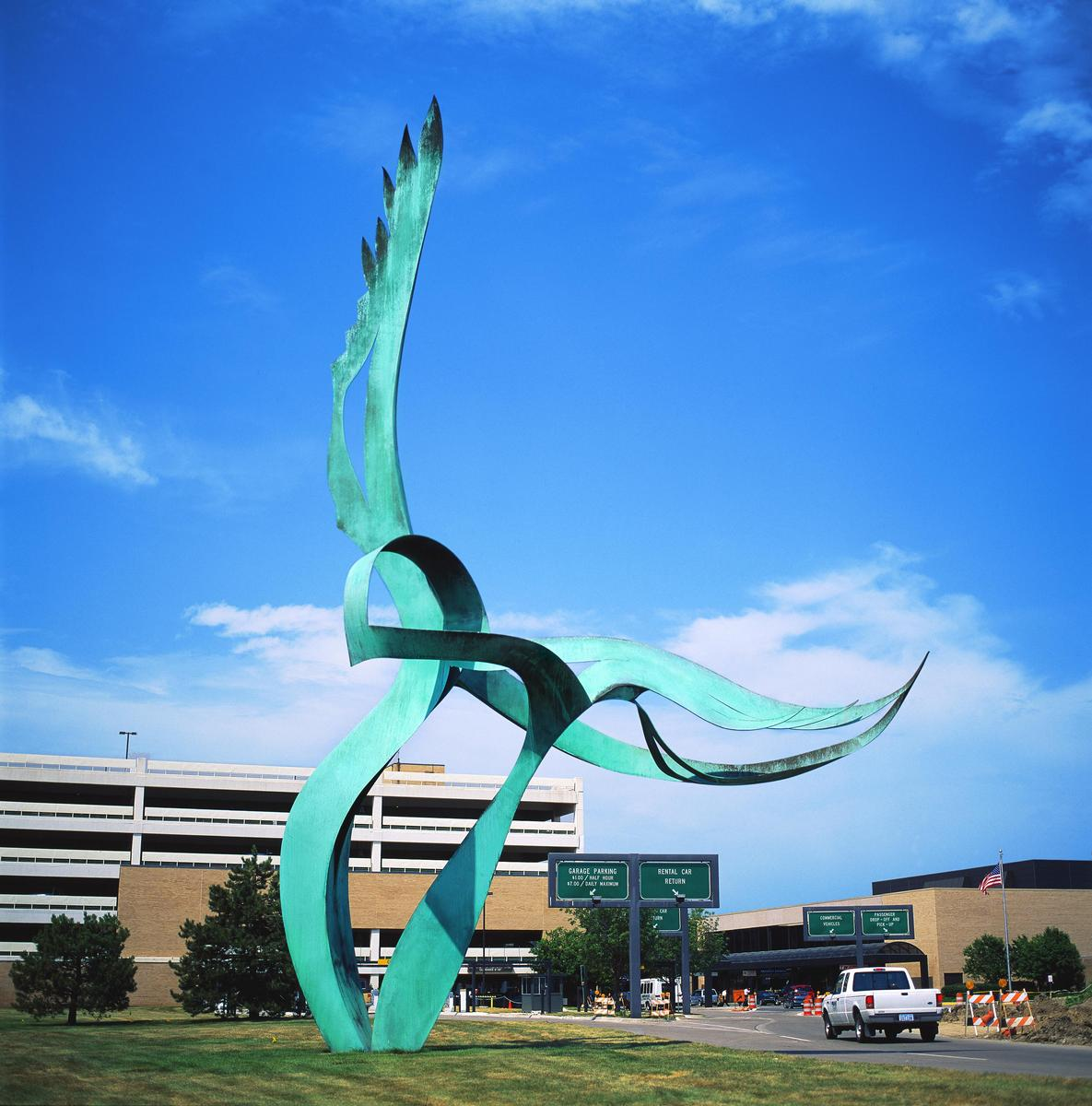
Dance of the Cranes (1988), 60' x 33' x 15', Bronze.
