= Flood Plain (painting) =

Painting by Andrew Wyeth

- Artist: Andrew Wyeth
- Year: 1986
- Type: Tempera on panel
- Dimensions: 62.2 cm × 121.9 cm (24 1/2 in × 48 in)
- Location: Private collection

Flood Plain is a 1986 painting by the American artist Andrew Wyeth. It depicts a part of the artist's family's land in Chadds Ford, Pennsylvania in the winter, with patches of ice in the grass. In the foreground is a pile of hay with the remnants of an old hay wagon. Two icy wheel tracks lead to a mill and a granary in the background.

== Creation ==
In his 1995 autobiography, Wyeth said about this painting that he "wanted to capture the clean-swept character of the beginning of the winter after the floods".

== Provenance ==
The painting was acquired by the art dealer Frank E. Fowler and sold to the actor Charlton Heston in 1988. Heston was a friend and promoter of Wyeth and owned several of his paintings. In 1991 he received Wyeth's study for Flood Plain as a Christmas gift from the artist.

The painting was sold through Sotheby's in 2015 for $5,178,000. The estimated value at the auction was $2,000,000—3,000,000.
