= Elvira Dyangani Ose =

Spanish art curator (born 1974)

Elvira Dyangani
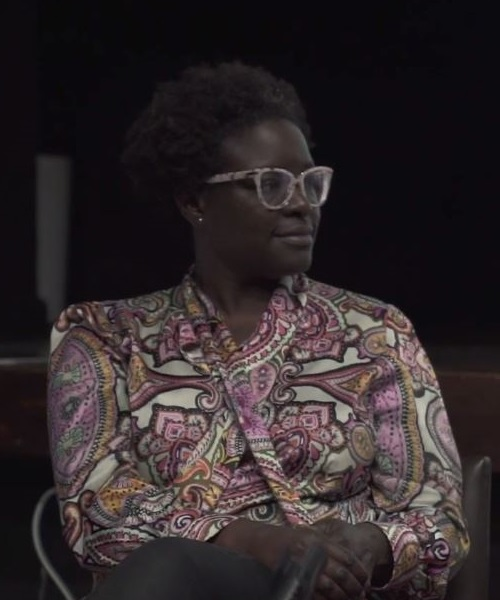
- Dyangani speaking at TEOR/éTica in 2019
- Born: Elvira Dyangani Ose; 1974 (age 51–52); Córdoba, Spain
- Occupation: Art curator

Elvira Dyangani Ose (born 1974) is a Spanish art curator who was appointed artistic director of Zeitz Museum of Contemporary Art Africa (Zeitz MoCAA) in 2026. She previously served as the director of MACBA Contemporary Art Museum in Barcelona from 2021 to 2026.

Dyangani's family comes from Equatorial Guinea, and she was born and raised in Spain. From 2018 to 2021, she was the director and chief curator at The Showroom gallery, London.

== Early life and education ==
Dyangani Ose obtained her Bachelor of Arts degree in Art History from the Universitat Autònoma de Barcelona. While she was studying in Barcelona, her professor encouraged her to exhibit; during the 1990s, she began creating pop-up exhibitions with her fellow students. These exhibitions featured young urban artists working out of the mainstream. Ose subsequently received her Diploma of Advanced Studies degree in Theory and History of Architecture from the Universitat Politècnica de Catalunya (Barcelona) and she is a Doctoral Candidate in Arts in History of Art and Visual Studies from Cornell University.

== Career ==
From 2004 to 2006, Dyangani Ose was a curator at the Centro Atlántico de Arte Moderno. In 2006, she curated the Olvida Quien Soy/ Erase Me From Who I Am exhibition, which featured works from Nicholas Hlobo, Zanele Muholi, Moshekwa Langa, and others. The exhibition focused on issues of representation. She also curated projects by Alfredo Jaar, Lara Almárcegui, and Ábalos & Herreros.

From 2006 to 2008, Dyangani Ose was a curator at the Centro Andaluz de Arte Contemporáneo. From 2007 to 2008, she curated the interdisciplinary project Attempt to Exhaust an African Place.

From 2009 to 2010, Dyangani Ose curated Arte Invisible. In 2010, she also curated Carrie Mae Weems: Social Studies, as well as being guest curator of triennial SUD-Salon Urbain de Douala.

=== Tate, 2011–2014 ===
In 2011, Dyangani Ose joined the Tate, where she worked closely with the African Acquisitions Committee and developed the museum's holdings relating to the African Diaspora. This position was supported by the Guaranty Trust Bank of Nigeria.

From 2012 to 2014, Dyangani Ose was responsible for the Across the Board project, which was an interdisciplinary project in London, Accra, Douala, and Lagos. She also co-curated the 2013 exhibit, Ibrahim al-Salahi: A Visionary Modernist. During 2013, she was also the Artistic Director for the third edition of Rencontres Picha. Guaranty Trust Bank.

On 28 June 2014, Dyangani Ose was named curator of the eighth edition of Göteborg International Biennial for Contemporary Art (GIBCA).

In 2016, Dyangani Ose was a member of the jury that selected Stan Douglas as a recipient of the Hasselblad Foundation International Award in Photography.

In 2017, Dyangani Ose was named Senior Curator at Creative Time.

=== The Showroom, 2018–2021 ===
From 2018 to 2021, Dyangani Ose has been director and chief curator at The Showroom gallery, London.

In 2018, Dyangani Ose was part of the selection committee that nominated Ruangrupa as artistic director of Documenta fifteen. She later served on the juries that awarded the Turner Prize to Lawrence Abu Hamdan, Helen Cammock, Oscar Murillo and Tai Shani in 2019, as well as the Lise Wilhelmsen Art Award to Otobong Nkanga in 2019 and to Guadalupe Maravilla in 2021.

=== MACBA, 2021–2026 ===
Dyangani Ose took over as director of MACBA in 2021. In 2026, she stepped down shortly ahead of her contract’s original expiration date.

During her time at MACBA, Dyangani Ose served on the selection committees that awarded the Future Generation Art Prize to Aziz Hazara in 2021 and the Mondrian Prize to Sammy Baloji in 2026.

Sponsored by Miu Miu, Dyangani Ose worked with artist Goshka Macuga on conceiving Tales & Tellers, a five-day event re-enacting the fashion brand's series of short films, as part of Art Basel Paris's public program at Palais d'Iéna in 2024.

In 2026, Dyangani Ose briefly served on the jury of the 61st Venice Biennale but eventually resigned. She later served on the jury that awarded the Sam Gilliam Award to Edgar Calel that same year.

== Lectures and publications ==
Dyangani Ose has lectured on modern and contemporary African art. She has been published in Nka and Atlántica.
