= Lohner Carlson =

Artist duo

Lohner Carlson was the team of Henning Lohner and Van Carlson, whose creative collaboration began in 1989. Since Carlson's death in 2011, Lohner has continued the act. They are known for their series Active Images, which bridges a gap between photography and narrative film, as well as for blurring the line between image and video.

== Collaborations with John Cage ==
Lohner's collaboration with Emmy-Award-winning cinematographer and photographer Van Carlson started in 1989, with the biographical art film Peefeeyatko, an intimate music portrait of American composer Frank Zappa. It was the first time that Zappa had allowed a film crew to study him during compositional work, actually filming the first moments of a new compositional process. The film is described as featuring "a very unique look at Frank Zappa and his work."

Their encounter and subsequent work with composer John Cage was highly influential for Lohner and Carlson's lifelong artistic partnership. This work includes the monochrome art film One^{11} and 103 in 1992, directed by Lohner and photographed by Carlson. One^{11} is the only feature-length film production Cage was ever involved in. It has no plot and consists of black-and-white images depicting a composed and chance-determined play of electric light, accompanied by Cage's orchestra piece 103. Described as an "abstract study in light and shade," it was completed in 1992 shortly before Cage's death.

One^{11} received positive reviews from film and music critics, with Palm D'Or-winning filmmaker Louis Malle calling it "very strong, very daring, and finally completely mesmerizing." Gramophone magazine stated that the production was "a splendid project carried out with dedication by all concerned" and noted the "remarkable quality of these uniquely pure visual images, studies in light ranging from total black to total white," while The Wire commented, "what an extraordinary valedictory throw of the dice." The film originally aired on German television and has been presented at various theatrical venues and exhibitions since its premiere in September 1992.

After Cage died in August 1992, Lohner and Carlson paid homage to the musician with the meticulously "composed film" The Revenge of the Dead Indians, featuring artists such as Dennis Hopper, Matt Groening and Yoko Ono. The production is a tribute to Cage, his thoughts, music, and influence, and has been described as "an unexpected and fascinating combination of intellectual thought, viewpoints and opinions."

== Active Images ==
In 1995, Lohner and Carlson's audio-visual composition Raw Material, Vol. 1–11 was shown for the first time. This installation was exhibited throughout Europe, particularly in The Hague, Rome and Berlin. Composed from their archive of hundreds of hours of footage, the installation showed interviews as well as landscapes on eleven monitors, with an equal emphasis on speech, pictures and sounds.

Lohner and Carlson's Active Images developed and was first shown at the Galerie Springer Berlin in 2006, titled Raw Material – Portraits and Landscapes. According to Lohner, the idea "arose from our love of video photography and from our subsequent despair over the loss of these images when turning them into [an edited] film." Presented on flat displays, the works bridge the recognizable gap between photography and narrative film and thus "blur the line between image and video." According to Photography Now, in their video works Lohner and Carlson "depict emblematic picture-themes, which underlie a subtle and uncontrolled pictorial movement. In doing so, the artists present a fixed-frame video picture only to release a brief moment of causal action."

Lohner said that he and Carlson were intrigued by "the culture of the Everyday, to show things that are so-to-say 'hidden right in front of our eyes.' " "We are interested in the unusual in the common, the extraordinary in the ordinary. We are interested in the road-side peculiarities that swiftly pass by because one is traveling in a car focused on going somewhere else. We try to pay attention to things along the way-side, things that get overlooked."

Following Carlson's death in 2011, Lohner has continued the work of Lohner Carlson on his own. Speaking at an exhibition in 2015, Lohner himself described their artworks as "visual music."

Lohner Carlson's media art has been exhibited at various venues, such as the Centre Pompidou, the Guggenheim Museum in New York, the San Francisco Museum of Modern Art, the Calouste Gulbenkian Museum in Lisbon, the National Visual Art Gallery of Malaysia in Kuala Lumpur and the Mira Art Collection in Tokyo.

Most recently, Lohner Carlson's art has been exhibited at the Gerhard Richter exhibition of the Max Liebermann Haus at the Stiftung Brandenburger Tor in Berlin.

== Reception ==
German culture critic Detlef Wolff has called Lohner an "unceasingly curious artist capable of looking closely, continuously able to discover the extraordinary in the seemingly ordinary." He said that Lohner Carlson's work rises far above the otherwise often tedious depths of video art and reaches its peak because Lohner and Carlson command dealing with the camera perfectly.

Of an exhibition at the Erik Thomsen Gallery in 2012, a review noted that Lohner and Carlson's work combined "the best of moving images and photographic approaches. The images are shown on a series of high resolution video panels and provide a poetic and elegant glance at seemingly normal scenes. Yet they succeed in unframing our structured visual perception of reality and moving us out of that perception box, if we look closely enough embracing a meditative patience."

ARTnews magazine commented that Lohner and Carlson were "able to produce extremely meditative scenes, often using the blandest subject matter, such as a flock of geese or sheep aimlessly milling about in high-definition and high-key color." It further said that in some of the works, "there is the sense of a landscape brought to life, as the motions of sky and water are captured in tiny increments." The review called the 1990 work Manhattan Yellow Sky with Steam "a mesmerizing urban-scape, with yellowed wisps of vapor dancing among towering smokestacks." Additionally, it commented that the "moodiest of the lot was Osaka Hotel Room (1991), in which a square picture window, next to a glowing lamp, acted as a kind of screen within the screen, the sky over the city gradually darkening and coming to pulsing, nocturnal life." The review concluded:

"If you've ever wished for a movie to stand still so that you might enjoy a prolonged sequence of pure visual pleasure, these images speak to those spaces that get swallowed up or lost in the interest of a different kind of storytelling."

Reviewing Lohner Carlson's 2013 exhibition at Galerie Springer in Berlin, which showed a "somewhat retrospective look back at the duo's work as well as new films created by Lohner since his partner's death," art publication Blouin Artinfo wrote:

"Presented on flat panel TVs encased in brown wooden frames, many of the works initially trick the eye into thinking they are indeed still images. [...] For example, in 'Mineo Rooftops' (2010), the Sicilian scene, Lohner Carlson's steady gaze achieves the narrative sense of place with utmost ease that a still image might have glossed over in its single shot or that a film might have presented to forcibly through dialogue or created storyline. […] 'Istanbul Bridge' (2012), on the other hand, effuses an ever more globalizing world, and the geopolitical contingencies presented by the Eurozone. However, there is a sense that none of these connotative readings of the works is all that important for Lohner or was for Carlson. Much more important is the taking of a moment to stop, look, and examine outside of a time so otherwise bound by a schizophrenic culture of images."

== Exhibitions ==
=== Solo shows ===
- 2021: Art Break – Henning Lohner: Gerhard Richter im Atelier, Stiftung Brandenburger Tor – Max Liebermann Haus, Berlin
- 2018: Galerie Hus, Paris
- 2017: Felix Ringel Galerie, Düsseldorf
- 2017: Ars Electronica Center, Linz
- 2017: Ikono.tv, worldwide
- 2015: Galerie Löhrl, Mönchengladbach
- 2014: RSA Antiquitäten, Wiesbaden
- 2013: Egeskov Fine Arts, Copenhagen
- 2013: RSA Antiquitäten, Wiesbaden
- 2013: INM – Institut für Neue Medien, Frankfurt am Main
- 2013: Galerie Springer, Berlin
- 2012: Erik Thomsen Gallery, New York
- 2012: Galerie Brachfeld, Paris (2x)
- 2012: SEZ – Sport- und Erholungszentrum, Berlin
- 2012: Galerie Hus, Paris
- 2011: Galerie Son, Berlin
- 2009: Bilirubin Gallery, Berlin
- 2008: Galerie Springer & Winckler, Berlin
- 2007: Galleria Traghetto, Rome
- 2006: Galerie Springer & Winckler, Berlin
- 1997: Goethe Institute Rome (Festival Internationale della Installazione Sonora), Rome
- 1996: Pfalzgalerie, Kaiserslautern
- 1996: 12th International Video & Film Festival, Kassel
- 1996: World Wide Videofest, Gemeente Museum, The Hague
- 1995: Lichthaus, Bremen
- 1995: Hessisches Landesmuseum, Wiesbaden
- 1995: Foro Artistico in der Eisfabrik, Hannover

=== Group shows ===
- 2022: Rapture of the Deep. Film Under Water DFF – Deutsches Filminstitut & Filmmuseum, Frankfurt am Main
- 2022: 10 Jahre Galerie Springer Jubiläumsausstellung, Berlin
- 2018: Holocaust Memorial Day, Ikono.tv, worldwide
- 2017: Art & Technology, BOZAR Musée de l'art contemporain, Brussels
- 2016: Musicircus, Centre Pompidou, Metz
- 2015: Alles hat seine Zeit, WimmerPlus, Prien am Chiemsee
- 2014: The Vertigo of Reality, Academy of Arts, Berlin
- 2014: Neither, Seventeen, London
- 2014: Serpentine Cinema, Serpentine Gallery, London
- 2014: Hannah Rickards Exhibit, Modern Art Oxford, Oxford
- 2013: A Grammar of Subversion, Barbican Centre, London
- 2012: The Freedom of Sound - John Cage Behind The Iron Curtain, Ludwig Museum of Contemporary Art, Budapest
- 2012: Raum – Räume, Galerie Springer, Berlin
- 2012: Dennis Hopper: The Lost Album, Martin Gropius Bau, Berlin
- 2012: John Cage and ..., Museum der Moderne, Salzburg
- 2012: John Cage and ..., Academy of Arts, Berlin
- 2012: A House full of Music, Mathildenhöhe, Darmstadt
- 2012: Sounds like Silence, Hartware Medienkunstverein, Dortmund
- 2012: Warsaw Autumn, Exhibition Space of the Austrian Embassy, Warsaw
- 2011: INM 20th Anniversary Exhibition, Ministry of Economics, Wiesbaden
- 2011: Tendencies in Contemporary Art, Wirtschaftsforum, Berlin
- 2011: Group Show Heisig – Oh – Lohner Carlson, Galerie Son, Berlin
- 2010: Realismus, Kunsthal, Rotterdam
- 2010: Realismus, Kunsthalle der Hypo-Kulturstiftung, Munich
- 2010: Realismus, Kunsthalle Emden, Emden
- 2008: Performance Art, SFMOMA, San Francisco
- 2007: Tendencies in Contemporary Art, Galleria Traghetto, Venedig
- 1996: National Art Gallery of Malaysia, Kuala Lumpur
- 1996: Portland Art Museum, Portland, Oregon
- 1995: Artist in Residence, INM – Institut für Neue Medien, Frankfurt am Main
- 1995: Videofest, Podewil, Berlin
- 1994: Rolywholyover a Circus, The Menil Collection, Houston
- 1994: Artists of the INM, Galerie der Stadt, Sindelfingen
- 1993: Rolywholyover a Circus, MOCA, Los Angeles
- 1993: European Media Arts Festival, Osnabrück
- 1993: Secondo Colloquio internationale di Musica Contemporanea, Palermo
- 1992: 30 Years Fluxus, Kunstverein Wiesbaden, Wiesbaden
- 1991: Classique en Images, La Scala, Milan
- 1991: Classique en Images, Louvre, Paris
