= Van Carlson =

Van Theodore Carlson (May 4, 1950 - December 14, 2011) was an American photographer, cinematographer and visual artist, known for the media art of Lohner Carlson.

== Life and career ==
Van Theodore Carlson was born in Colorado in 1950. He studied philosophy and film and then moved to Hollywood in 1978.

For cinematography, Carlson received two Primetime Emmy Award nominations. He has worked with directors such as Steven Spielberg, David Lynch and Peter Friedman as well as for productions with Arte, ZDF, A&E, HBO, History Channel, Lifetime, and PBS.

Carlson's frequent collaborator and artistic partner was award-winning filmmaker, media artist and composer Henning Lohner. Their acclaimed artistic partnership, known as Lohner Carlson, started in 1989 with the biographical art film Peefeeyatko about famed American rock musician Frank Zappa. Of Carlson's work, Zappa said: “The guy’s brilliant.”

Lohner and Carlson were also influenced by their collaboration with composer John Cage, which includes the art film One^{11} and 103 (1992) directed by Lohner, “a 90-minute black-and-white meditation on the waxing and waning of light.” They paid posthumous homage to Cage with the “composed film” The Revenge of the Dead Indians, featuring artists such as Dennis Hopper and Yoko Ono.

Their audio-visual composition Raw Material, Vol. 1–11 (1995), composed from their archive of hundreds of hours of footage, was exhibited throughout Europe. It showed interviews as well as landscapes on eleven monitors, with an equal emphasis on speech, pictures and sounds “in a new, free form of presentation,” showing pictures moving images on walls, presented on flat displays.

Subsequently, Lohner and Carlson’s Active Images developed, first shown at the Galerie Springer Berlin in 2006. According to Lohner, the idea “arose from our love of video photography and from our subsequent despair over the loss of these images when turning them into [an edited] film.” Presented on flat displays, the works “blur the line between image and video.”

Lohner Carlson’s media art has been exhibited worldwide, at venues such as the Centre Pompidou, the Guggenheim Museum in New York, the San Francisco Museum of Modern Art, the Calouste Gulbenkian Museum in Lisbon, the National Visual Art Gallery of Malaysia in Kuala Lumpur and the Mira Art Collection in Tokyo.
