= Rachel Kneebone =

English artist (born 1973)

- Born: 1973 (age 52–53); Oxfordshire, England
- Education: University of the West of England, Bristol; Royal College of Art, London
- Known for: Porcelain sculpture
- Notable work: Regarding Rodin (2012); Raft of Medusa (2017); 399 Days (2017–2019)
- Movement: Contemporary art

Rachel Kneebone (born 1973) is an English artist who lives and works in London. She was shortlisted for the inaugural MaxMara Art Prize for Women in 2005.

== Life and work ==
Kneebone was born in Oxfordshire. She graduated in 1997 with a First Class BA (Hons) degree from the University of the West of England, Bristol and in 2004 with an MA in sculpture from the Royal College of Art, London.

In 2005 she was nominated for the MaxMara Art Prize for Women with Anne Hardy, Anj Smith, Margaret Salmon and Donna Huddleston. That year, she contributed work to a show, The Way We Work, at the Camden Arts Centre, London.

In 2005, she was commissioned to do a wall sculpture by Mario Testino for the Diana, Princess of Wales exhibition at Kensington Palace.

In July – August 2006, Kneebone had her first solo exhibition in London at Madder Rose gallery, which included a number of sculptures such as Loves all-worshipped tomb, where all love's pilgrims come (2005). All the show's works sold out on opening night. Reviewer Katarina Horrox commented that Kneebone's "carefully crafted sculptures witness various organic forms merging ambiguously into human body-parts as they climb elegantly up walls. Suggestive yet sensitive, her creations harp back to Ovid's Metamorphoses, whilst their fixed immobility implies a transgression of time and motion."

In 2007, The Evening Standard highlighted Kneebone as "one to watch" thanks to her "beautiful and sexy hand-moulded porcelain sculptures". In September 2007, Kneebone's work was included in the opening group exhibition An Archaeology at Project Space 176 in London's Chalk Farm area.

In 2008, Kneebone began to be represented by Jay Jopling and the White Cube gallery in London. Her first solo show with White Cube, The Descent, was in February 2009.

In 2008, Tracey Emin selected a work by Kneebone to include in her room at the Royal Academy's Summer Exhibition. Emin said: "Her work is exciting for me – porcelain figurines, vulnerable and with an eighteenth-century look. I like Georgian things – my house was built in 1729, and I like simplicity and straight lines."

Kneebone is known for finely sculpted white porcelain works of organic forms merging ambiguously into human body parts. Her work has been described as depicting an "erotic state of flux" and "celebrating forms of transgression, beauty and seduction", and said to be influenced by ancient Greek and Roman myths in Ovid's poem Metamorphoses and the "seductive, mythological paintings" of 18th-century artist François Boucher.

Kneebone's Raft of Medusa installation is an example of the white porcelain sculptures depicting a tumultuous confusion of limbs and shapes. The series of five porcelain sculptures were displayed in The Foundling Museum from 29 September 2017 to 7 January 2018. They expressed the Foundling Hospital's suppressed narrative of sexual desire, emotional damage and female strength, creating a resonant component to the Museum's exhibition, Basic Instincts.

In January 2009, Kneebone spoke to the Tate Etc. magazine about William Blake's work The Primaeval Giants Sunk in the Soil (1824–1827), from Illustrations to Dante's Divine Comedy, "Eighth Circle of Hell".

A 2012 exhibition at the Brooklyn Museum, Rachel Kneebone: Regarding Rodin, showcased eight of her original works next to fifteen from Auguste Rodin that Kneebone personally selected. The pairing brought to light themes of "sexuality, death, and sin."

From 2017 through 2019 the Victoria and Albert Museum displayed Kneebone's sculpture 399 Days, a 5-metre-high porcelain tower.

From 23 September 2026–25 April 2027, the Wallace Collection exhibited Metamorphoses: Porcelain Sculpture by Rachel Kneebone; of the nine sculptures on display, two were created for the exhibit.

== Collections ==
- Goss Michael Foundation (George Michael)
- Roberts Institute of Art
- Mario Testino
- Zabludowicz Collection (Project Space 176)
