= Collezione Maramotti =

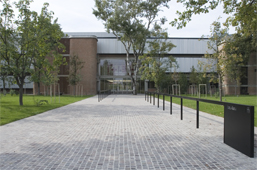
- The entrance on the east side
- Established: 2007
- Location: Reggio Emilia, Emilia-Romagna, Italy
- Coordinates: 44.7068°N 10.6011°E
- Type: private art museum
- Owner: Maramotti family
- Website: collezionemaramotti.org

The Collezione Maramotti is the private collection of contemporary art of Achille Maramotti, who founded Max Mara. It is housed in the former premises of the company in Reggio Emilia, in Emilia Romagna in central Italy, converted for the purpose by the British architect Andrew Hapgood. It contains some two hundred works, and is open to visitors by appointment only. It also organises temporary exhibitions.

Among the artists represented in the collection are Vito Acconci, Francis Bacon, Basquiat, Alberto Burri, Francesco Clemente, Tony Cragg, Tano Festa, Lucio Fontana, Piero Manzoni, Mario Merz, Luigi Ontani, Mimmo Paladino, Tom Sachs, Mario Schifano, Julian Schnabel and Bill Viola.

The gallery awards the biennial Max Mara Art Prize for Women to a young female artist working in the United Kingdom. Between 2006 and 2016 the winners of the prize were: Margaret Salmon; Hannah Rickards; Andrea Büttner; Laure Prouvost; Corin Sworn; and Emma Hart.
