= Incident at Loch Ness =

- Directed by: Zak Penn
- Written by: Zak Penn
- Produced by: Werner Herzog; Zak Penn
- Starring: Werner Herzog; Zak Penn; Kitana Baker; Robert O'Meara; Michael Karnow; Gabriel Beristain; Russell Williams II; Adrian Shine; Lena Herzog; Pietro Scalia; Crispin Glover; Ricky Jay; Jeff Goldblum
- Cinematography: John Bailey
- Edited by: Abby Schwartzwalder; Howard E. Smith
- Music by: Henning Lohner; Lorne Balfe
- Release date: 2004
- Running time: 94 minutes
- Country: United Kingdom
- Language: English

Incident at Loch Ness is a 2004 mockumentary starring and produced by Werner Herzog and Zak Penn, who also wrote it and directed it. The small cast film follows Herzog and his crew (Gabriel Beristain, Russell Williams II) while working on the production of a movie project on the Loch Ness Monster titled Enigma of Loch Ness. Incident at Loch Ness won the New American Cinema Award at the 2004 Seattle International Film Festival.

== Plot ==
After a mysterious shot of a body floating in Loch Ness (reprised near the end), Incident at Loch Ness flashes back to the beginning of a documentary called Herzog in Wonderland being directed by John Bailey with an overview of Herzog's work as he himself begins work for a separate documentary to be called Enigma of Loch Ness, in which he is exploring the Loch Ness Monster myth. Throughout the film, Herzog asserts the Loch Ness Monster is merely a creation of a collective psychological need in society.

As the film continues, Herzog hosts a dinner party to kick off film production. In attendance are his wife (Lena Herzog), several Hollywood celebrities (actors Jeff Goldblum, Ricky Jay, and Crispin Glover and editor Pietro Scalia), and the film's crew. Difficulties begin to arise as the untested producer, Zak Penn, attempts to transform Herzog's film into a high-grossing blockbuster. In this attempt, Penn commits several Hollywood clichés such as hiring a beautiful woman (Kitana Baker) for a dubious role as a sonar operator and a delusional cryptozoologist (Michael Karnow) for comic relief.

As the shooting progresses, the tension between Herzog and Penn escalates with each revelation that Penn is acting in an underhanded manner. First, it becomes quite apparent the producer has commissioned a fake "Nessie" to be used. Then both Kitana and Karnow are revealed to be actors hired by Penn.

In a twist of events, when Herzog and his crew are working on their film, the crew begins to see what appears truly to be the Loch Ness Monster. Herzog and crew become more and more concerned as first the boat's motor fails and then the "monster" appears to be attacking the vessel in a deepening fog. The crew huddles below decks until the monster returns again to ram the boat hard enough to cause it to begin to sink. Karnow is thrown overboard during another attack, "Nessie" now clearly visible to the crew. Karnow is lost in the fog and presumably eaten by the monster. After Penn and the assistant director (Robert O'Meara), sneak away in the liferaft, Herzog decides to put on the ship's sole wetsuit and swim to shore for help. Before he can do so, however, "Nessie" returns to finally sink the ship. While holding a camera in a water-resistant housing, Herzog captures underwater images of a large creature passing him in the murky, dark water.

The next day, Penn is found by vacationers and leads them back to recover all but O'Meara and Karnow, who are presumed dead. At this point, it appears that both the documentary film we have been watching and the documentary film we were watching Herzog make could be fictitious. However, this never becomes completely obvious, and the film ends without making it clear exactly who is duping whom.

== Cast ==
- Werner Herzog as himself
- Kitana Baker as herself
- Gabriel Beristain as himself
- Russell Williams II as himself
- David A. Davidson as himself
- Michael Karnow as himself
- Robert O'Meara as himself
- Zak Penn as himself
- Steven Gardner as himself
- Adrian Shine as himself
- John Bailey as Herzog's Crew In Wonderland
- Matthew Nicolay as Herzog's Crew In Wonderland
- Tanja Koop as Herzog's Crew In Wonderland
- Marty Signore as Herzog's Crew In Wonderland
- Crispin Glover as Party Guest
- Jeff Goldblum as Party Guest
- Lena Herzog as Party Guest
- Ricky Jay as Party Guest
- Pietro Scalia as Party Guest
- Jenno Topping as Party Guest
- Stephen A. Marinaccio as Propmaster
- Michael Scott-Law as Angry Man At Bar

== Production ==
The entire movie is actually a mockumentary film-within-a-film-within-a-film invented by Penn. The ruse is revealed in Easter eggs hidden on the DVD. Penn wrote what he calls a "scriptment" (part script, part treatment) that outlined the specific structure of the film and including key dialogue that was needed in order to advance the plot, but left most of the dialogue and interaction up to the participants to work out as improvisation.

As shown on the DVD, the "hoax" was on even before photography started as several media outlets announced the upcoming production as an actual film. Adding to the verisimilitude is the fact that everyone who appears on screen is a real person and most are in fact who they say they are. For example, DP Gabriel Beristain and soundman Russell Williams II are well-known, distinguished professionals who did work on the productions they respectively name on screen.

== Critical reaction ==
Incident at Loch Ness holds a score of 64% on review aggregator Rotten Tomatoes, based on 45 critic reviews with an average rating of 6.2/10. The website's critics consensus reads, "Incident at Loch Ness will undoubtedly be of greatest interest to Herzog fans, but for those in on the inside jokes, it delivers on its weirdly unique premise." It also holds a weighted average score of 62/100 on Metacritic based on 20 critics, indicating "generally favorable reviews".

Critic Roger Ebert enjoyed the film, giving it 3 stars out of 4, saying: "Watching the movie is an entertaining exercise in forensic viewing, and the insidious thing is, even if it is a con, who is the conner and who is the connee?" Kenneth Turan of the Los Angeles Times called it: "an amusing mock documentary that spends considerable energy artfully trying to make you believe it's real as real can be."
