= Corin Sworn =

British-Canadian artist (born 1976)

Corin Sworn (born 1976) is an artist who lives and works in Glasgow. Her 2012 installation and film The Foxes was shown at the Scottish Pavilion of the 2013 Venice Biennale. Sworn was the recipient of the fifth edition of the Max Mara Art Prize.

== Education and early career ==
Born in London, England, Sworn grew up in Canada. She was raised in Toronto before moving to Vancouver where she received her Bachelor of Arts degree in psychology at the University of British Columbia in 1999. She then began her BFA at the Emily Carr Institute of Art & Design in Vancouver, while simultaneously earning a degree from the Central Saint Martins College of Art & Design in 2002. In 2008, Sworn was one of eight artists in the Exponential Futures show at the Morris and Helen Belkin Art Gallery, alongside Tim Lee, Alex Morrison, Kevin Schmidt, Althea Thauberger, Isabelle Pauwells, Elizabeth Zvonar and Marc Soo. In 2007 she began her Master of Fine Arts degree at the Glasgow School of Art, graduating in 2009. Since graduating, Sworn has continued to live and work in Glasgow.

== Work ==
Sworn's work ranges across a variety of media, including drawings, installations, photos and films. Colin Perry writes that her works "address ways in which human subjectivity is woven into overarching social trends and specific cultural forms." She has been featured in galleries including the National Gallery of Canada, Whitechapel Gallery in London, and the Museum of Contemporary Art Australia. She is commercially represented in the United Kingdom by the Koppe Astner art gallery, in Germany by the Natalia Hug Galler and in the United States by ZieherSmith. In 2013 Sworn was commissioned to create a poster design, Waiting for a Train, as part of London Underground's 150th anniversary celebrations.

== Awards ==
Sworn won the fifth edition of the Max Mara Art Prize, organised by Collezione Maramotti (Reggio Emilia), Max Mara and in collaboration with the Whitechapel Gallery of London. The prize was a six-month residency in Italy where Sworn developed her 2015 installation Silent Sticks. The installation included film shot by Margaret Salmon displayed on two narrow screens. The installation space was filled with handmade props, lights, 16th-century commedia dell'arte performer costumes, still lifes, and disembodied voices telling the story of Martin Guerre.
