= Henning Lohner =

German-American composer and filmmaker (born 1961)

- Lohner in 2005
- Born: 17 July 1961 (age 65); Bremen, West Germany
- Education: Frankfurt University; Berklee College of Music
- Occupations: Filmmaker; composer
- Spouse: Ricarda Proescher

Henning Lohner (born 17 July 1961) is a German-American composer and filmmaker. He is best known for his film scores written as a long-standing member of Hans Zimmer’s music cooperative Remote Control Productions.

Lohner has written scores to various international films, among them The Ring Two and Incident at Loch Ness. Additionally, he has authored documentaries and art films, and has gained international recognition as creator of the Active Images media art projects.

== Background and education ==
Born to German emigrant parents, Henning Lohner was raised near Palo Alto, California, where his father Edgar Lohner taught Comparative Literature at Stanford University and his mother Marlene Lohner taught German Literature. Lohner has one brother, Peter, who is a lawyer turned writer-producer for film and television.

Lohner returned to West Germany to study musicology, art history, and Romanic languages at Frankfurt University, from which he graduated as Master of Arts in 1987. In 1982, he took a year at the Berklee College of Music in Boston, studying Jazz Improvisation with Gary Burton and Film Scoring with Jerry Goldsmith and David Raksin. In 1985, Lohner was awarded a grant for music composition at the Centre Acanthes to study with Greek composer Iannis Xenakis, who became his lifelong mentor.

Lohner became assistant to German composer Karlheinz Stockhausen in 1984; Lohner was introduced to the visual media working on Stockhausen’s opera Licht at La Scala in Milan. Subsequently, he worked in France in 1989 as musical advisor and assistant director to Louis Malle on the film May Fools (1990). Apprenticeships on Steve Reich’s multi-media oratorio The Cave (1990) and with Giorgio Strehler on his theater project Goethes Faust I + II (1990–1992) followed. Due to his commitment to contemporary music and avant-garde filmmaking, Frank Zappa became aware of Lohner; subsequently, Lohner collaborated with him until Zappa’s death in 1993, initializing and co-producing Zappa’s last albums The Yellow Shark (1992) and Civilization Phaze III (1993). He paid homage to Zappa with the biographical art film Peefeeyatko (1991), to which Zappa himself contributed the original score.

Lohner lives and works in Los Angeles, New York City and Berlin. He is a Visiting Professor at the Zurich University of the Arts in Switzerland. Lohner is a member of the European Film Academy and the German Film Academy.

== Film scoring ==
In 1996, Lohner began his career as film composer in Los Angeles at Hans Zimmer’s film score company Remote Control Productions. Lohner contributed music to Broken Arrow, The Thin Red Line, and Gladiator, and provided additional composing on The Ring and Spanglish, which received a Golden Globe nomination for Best Original Score.

To date, Lohner has scored over 40 feature films, covering a variety of genres ranging from comedies such as Werner Herzog’s Incident at Loch Ness (2004), children’s animation films like Laura's Star (2004), to horror movies such as Hellraiser: Deader (2005), and family entertainment like Turtle: The Incredible Journey (2009). Regarding his music for the drama Love Comes Lately (2007), which was shown at the Toronto International Film Festival and the Sundance Film Festival, Screen International wrote, “a pleasant score with befitting Central European echoes adds to the congeniality of the proceedings.“

Often regarded as a “Hollywood composer” in the German media, Lohner does on occasion work in his home country, having scored movies by Bernd Eichinger and Til Schweiger among others. Lohner’s score for the silent film classic The Hands of Orlac premiered at the Ghent opera house in Belgium during the International Film Festival Ghent of 2001.

Lohner's music to The Ring Two received two BMI Music Awards and was nominated for the International Film Music Critics Association Awards as Best Horror Score. The Hollywood Reporter praised Lohner’s score, commenting, "An atmosphere of foreboding is aided by moody, insistent music.“

In 2012, Lohner was commissioned to rearrange the theme tune of the oldest and most watched news program on German television, Tagesschau, which caused a stir in the German media; Lohner wrote new compositions for all newscasts of the German principal public television channel Das Erste. Premiering in 2014, Lohner’s compositions received unanimously positive reviews.

== Media art ==
Lohner’s collaboration with cinematographer Van Carlson started in 1989 with Peefeeyatko. Their artistic partnership, known as Lohner Carlson, was influenced by their collaboration with composer John Cage, which includes the art film One^{11} and 103 (1992) directed by Lohner, “a 90-minute black-and-white meditation on the waxing and waning of light.” Gramophone magazine called the production “a splendid project carried out with dedication by all concerned” and noted the “remarkable quality of these uniquely pure visual images, studies in light ranging from total black to total white.” Lohner paid homage to Cage posthumously with the “composed film” The Revenge of the Dead Indians, featuring artists such as Dennis Hopper, Matt Groening and Yoko Ono.

Lohner and Carlson exhibited their audio-visual composition Raw Material, Vol. 1–11 (1995) throughout Europe, for instance in The Hague, Rome and Berlin. Composed from their archive of hundreds of hours of footage, the installation was “a multi-facetted mosaic of films […] focussing on humanistic issues;” it showed interviews as well as landscapes on eleven monitors, with an equal emphasis on speech, pictures and sounds “in a new, free form of presentation,” thus generating “a type of global talk.” Subsequently, Lohner and Carlson’s Active Images developed, first shown at the Galerie Springer Berlin in 2006. According to Lohner himself, the idea “arose from our love of video photography and from our subsequent despair over the loss of these images when turning them into [an edited] film.” Presented on flat displays, the works bridge the recognizable gap between photography and narrative film and thus “blur the line between image and video.”

Lohner’s media art has been exhibited at the Centre Pompidou, the Guggenheim Museum in New York, the San Francisco Museum of Modern Art, the Calouste Gulbenkian Museum in Lisbon, the National Visual Art Gallery of Malaysia in Kuala Lumpur and the Mira Art Collection in Tokyo.

German culture reviewer Detlef Wolff has called Lohner an “unceasingly curious artist capable of looking closely, continuously able to discover the extraordinary in the seemingly ordinary.” Of an exhibition at the Erik Thomsen Gallery in 2012, a review noted that Lohner and Carlson’s work combined “the best of moving images and photographic approaches. The images are shown on a series of high resolution video panels and provide a poetic and elegant glance at seemingly normal scenes. Yet they succeed in unframing our structured visual perception of reality and moving us out of that perception box, if we look closely enough embracing a meditative patience.”

== Directing ==
Lohner began producing and directing cultural reports for German Public Television in 1988. He has directed more than 100 short films and over 40 feature-length documentaries and teleplays, many of them portraits of influential contemporary artists such as Dennis Hopper, Benoit Mandelbrot, Gerhard Richter, Karl Lagerfeld, Brian Eno, and Abel Ferrara.

Lohner’s documentary Ninth November Night about painter Gottfried Helnwein’s installation commemorating the Reichskristallnacht, featuring Sean Penn and Maximilian Schell, premiered at the American Film Institute Festival and was shortlisted for the Academy Awards as Best Documentary Short Subject. The Malibu Times called Lohner’s film a “moving portrayal,” and the Los Angeles Times commented, “A stirring meditation on art and remembrance, Ninth November Night documents Austrian artist Gottfried Helnwein's sprawling 1988 art installation recalling the horrors of the Holocaust.”

== Awards and honors ==
- 1991 Nomination & Runner-Up, 1st International Music Film Awards, Cannes, France
- 1994 Silver Apple Award from the National Educational Film Festival of the USA for One^{11} and 103
- 2005 Academy Award Shortlist, category: Best Documentary Short for Ninth November Night
- 2005 International Film Music Critics Association Awards Nomination for The Ring Two as Best Original Score for a Horror/Thriller Film
- 2006 BMI Film Music Award for The Ring Two

== Exhibitions as Lohner Carlson ==
=== Solo shows ===
- 2021: Art Break – Henning Lohner: Gerhard Richter im Atelier, Stiftung Brandenburger Tor – Max Liebermann Haus, Berlin
- 2018: Galerie Hus, Paris
- 2017: Felix Ringel Galerie, Düsseldorf
- 2017: Ars Electronica Center, Linz
- 2017: Ikono.tv, worldwide
- 2015: Galerie Löhrl, Mönchengladbach
- 2014: RSA Antiquitäten, Wiesbaden
- 2013: Egeskov Fine Arts, Copenhagen
- 2013: RSA Antiquitäten, Wiesbaden
- 2013: INM – Institut für Neue Medien, Frankfurt am Main
- 2013: Galerie Springer, Berlin
- 2012: Erik Thomsen Gallery, New York
- 2012: Galerie Brachfeld, Paris (2x)
- 2012: SEZ – Sport- und Erholungszentrum, Berlin
- 2012: Galerie Hus, Paris
- 2011: Galerie Son, Berlin
- 2009: Bilirubin Gallery, Berlin
- 2008: Galerie Springer & Winckler, Berlin
- 2007: Galleria Traghetto, Rome
- 2006: Galerie Springer & Winckler, Berlin
- 1997: Goethe Institute Rome (Festival Internationale della Installazione Sonora), Rome
- 1996: Pfalzgalerie, Kaiserslautern
- 1996: 12th International Video & Film Festival, Kassel
- 1996: World Wide Videofest, Gemeente Museum, The Hague
- 1995: Lichthaus, Bremen
- 1995: Hessisches Landesmuseum, Wiesbaden
- 1995: Foro Artistico in der Eisfabrik, Hannover

=== Group shows ===
- 2022: Rapture of the Deep. Film Under Water DFF – Deutsches Filminstitut & Filmmuseum, Frankfurt am Main
- 2022: 10 Jahre Galerie Springer Jubiläumsausstellung, Berlin
- 2018: Holocaust Memorial Day, Ikono.tv, worldwide
- 2017: Art & Technology, BOZAR Musée de l'art contemporain, Brussels
- 2016: Musicircus, Centre Pompidou, Metz
- 2015: Alles hat seine Zeit, WimmerPlus, Prien am Chiemsee
- 2014: The Vertigo of Reality, Academy of Arts, Berlin
- 2014: Neither, Seventeen, London
- 2014: Serpentine Cinema, Serpentine Gallery, London
- 2014: Hannah Rickards Exhibit, Modern Art Oxford, Oxford
- 2013: A Grammar of Subversion, Barbican Centre, London
- 2012: The Freedom of Sound - John Cage Behind The Iron Curtain, Ludwig Museum of Contemporary Art, Budapest
- 2012: Raum – Räume, Galerie Springer, Berlin
- 2012: Dennis Hopper: The Lost Album, Martin Gropius Bau, Berlin
- 2012: John Cage and ..., Museum der Moderne, Salzburg
- 2012: John Cage and ..., Academy of Arts, Berlin
- 2012: A House full of Music, Mathildenhöhe, Darmstadt
- 2012: Sounds like Silence, Hartware Medienkunstverein, Dortmund
- 2012: Warsaw Autumn, Exhibition Space of the Austrian Embassy, Warsaw
- 2011: INM 20th Anniversary Exhibition, Ministry of Economics, Wiesbaden
- 2011: Tendencies in Contemporary Art, Wirtschaftsforum, Berlin
- 2011: Group Show Heisig – Oh – Lohner Carlson, Galerie Son, Berlin
- 2010: Realismus, Kunsthal, Rotterdam
- 2010: Realismus, Kunsthalle der Hypo-Kulturstiftung, Munich
- 2010: Realismus, Kunsthalle Emden, Emden
- 2008: Performance Art, SFMOMA, San Francisco
- 2007: Tendencies in Contemporary Art, Galleria Traghetto, Venedig
- 1996: National Art Gallery of Malaysia, Kuala Lumpur
- 1996: Portland Art Museum, Portland, Oregon
- 1995: Artist in Residence, INM – Institut für Neue Medien, Frankfurt am Main
- 1995: Videofest, Podewil, Berlin
- 1994: Rolywholyover a Circus, The Menil Collection, Houston
- 1994: Artists of the INM, Galerie der Stadt, Sindelfingen
- 1993: Rolywholyover a Circus, MOCA, Los Angeles
- 1993: European Media Arts Festival, Osnabrück
- 1993: Secondo Colloquio internationale di Musica Contemporanea, Palermo
- 1992: 30 Years Fluxus, Kunstverein Wiesbaden, Wiesbaden
- 1991: Classique en Images, La Scala, Milan
- 1991: Classique en Images, Louvre, Paris

== Filmography (selection) ==
=== As composer ===
1998

- The Polar Bear with Klaus Badelt
- The Hands of Orlac new music to the silent movie of 1925

1999

- The Devil & Mrs.D together with Stephan Zacharias

2000

- Catching the Stars
- MTV Fear

2002

- 666 – Traue keinem, mit dem du schläfst!
- The Ring additional music; main score composed by Hans Zimmer

2003

- Ancient Warriors
- Barstow
- Dennis Hopper: Create or Die
- Mimic 3: Sentinel

2004

- Incident at Loch Ness
- The Turtles
- Laura's Star with Hans Zimmer and Nick Glennie-Smith
- Ninth November Night
- Spanglish additional music; main score composed by for Hans Zimmer
- Suiyô puremia: sekai saikyô J horâ SP – Nihon no kowai yoru

2005

- BloodRayne
- Hellraiser: Deader
- Santa's Slay
- The Ring Two

2006

- 10.5: Apocalypse
- Firestorm: Last Stand at Yellowstone
- Lauras Weihnachtsstern

2007

- Fetch
- Love Comes Lately
- In the Name of the King
- Timber Falls

2008

- Little Dodo
- Be Like Others
- Marcello Marcello
- Shuttle
- Night Train
- Turtle: The Incredible Journey

2009

- Laura's Star and the Mysterious Dragon Nian with Guy Cuyvers

2010

- Bloch
- Bhopali

2011

- Laura's Star and the Dream Monsters

2013

- Detour

2014

- Tagesschau and Tagesthemen

2021

- Laura's Star with Hans Zimmer and Nick Glennie-Smith

=== As film director and producer ===
1988

- Stockhausen: Lichtwerke

1990

- Stockhausen: Michaels Reise

1991

- Karl Lagerfeld und die Musik

1992

- 22708 Types
- Dennis Hopper as Collector and Artist
- Dixieland Jazzfestival Enkhuizen

1993

- United Jazz & Rock Ensemble in Concert

1994

- Gerhard Richter: 30 Years of Painting
- The Alphabet of Shapes

1995

- Dennis Hopper: L.A. Blues
- Les Prairies de la Mer Starring Jacques Cousteau and Louis Malle

1996

- The Modern String Quartet

1997

- Hollywood Halloween

1998

- Musik im Spiegel der Gefühle

2000

- German Hollywood Dreams

2003

- Dennis Hopper: Create or Die

2004

- Ninth November Night

=== As multi-media artist ===
1991

- Peefeeyatko audio-visual installation film about and in collaboration with Frank Zappa

1992

- one ^{11} and 103 audio-visual installation film by John Cage and Henning Lohner

1993

- The Revenge of the Dead Indians audio-visual installation film starring, among others, Heiner Müller, Yoko Ono, Rutger Hauer, Marvin Minsky, Edward Lorenz, Ellsworth Kelly

1994

- The Black Box of Culture audio-visual installation film with Brian Eno

1995–1996

- Lohner Carlson’s raw material, vol. 1 – 11 audio-visual installation for 11 audio & video monitor pairs

1996

- In a Metal Mood audio-visual installation film starring: Pat Boone, with: Deep Purple, Iron Maiden, Judas Priest, Metallica, Motörhead, Ozzy Osbourne, Sepultura, Venom

1990-dato

- Lohner Carlson’s Active Images: Silences unique digital media artworks
