= Laure Prouvost =

French artist (born 1978)

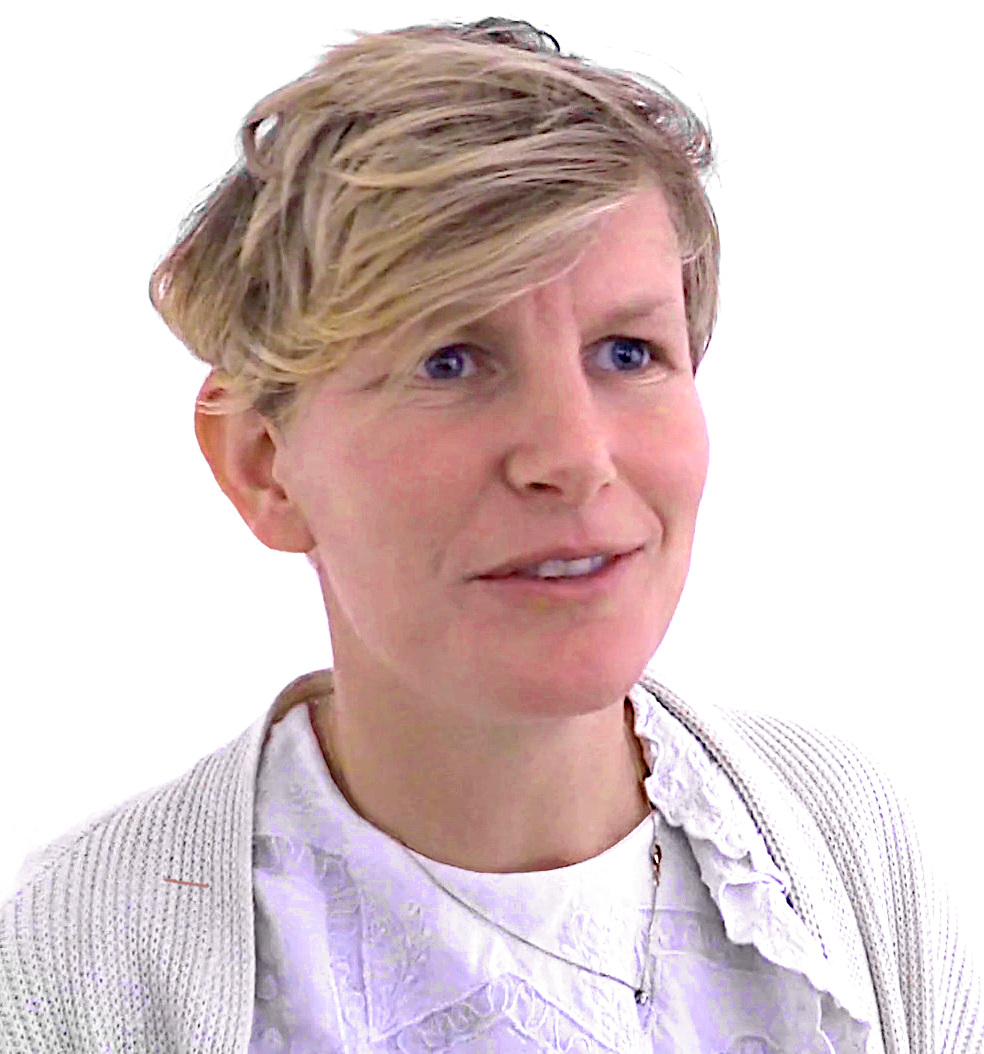
- Laure Prouvost in 2015
- Born: 1978 (age 47–48); Croix, France
- Education: Central Saint Martins, Goldsmiths
- Known for: art installations, sculpture, painting, tapestry, video installations
- Notable work: Wantee (2013)
- Awards: Turner Prize, MaxMara Art Prize
- Website: https://www.laureprouvost.com

Laure Prouvost (born 1978) is a French artist living and working in Brussels, Belgium. She won the 2013 Turner Prize. In 2019, she represented France at the Venice Biennale with the multi-media installation Deep See Blue Surrounding You.

== Early life and education ==
Prouvost was born in Croix, an upscale suburb of Lille, France, and attended a local school with a strong arts focus.

Prouvost studied film at Central Saint Martins and also attended Goldsmiths, University of London.

== Career ==
After graduating from Saint Martins, Prouvost worked as an assistant to the artist John Latham, who she describes as "more like a grandfather than my real grandfather". She has exhibited at Tate Britain and the Institute of Contemporary Arts.

Prouvost was awarded the biennial MaxMara Art Prize for Women in 2011 and her work has appeared in the private contemporary art collection Collezione Maramotti in Reggio Emilia, Italy. That same year, Prouvost was the principal prize winner at the 57th Oberhausen Film Festival.

Prouvost won the Turner Prize in 2013 for an installation named Wantee made in response to the artist Kurt Schwitters. In a tea party setting a film describes a fictional relationship between Prouvost's grandfather and Schwitters. The work is named in reference to the habit of Schwitters' partner of asking guests if they "want tea". The panel described the work as "outstanding for its complex and courageous combination of images and objects in a deeply atmospheric environment". Prouvost was generally considered a surprise winner.

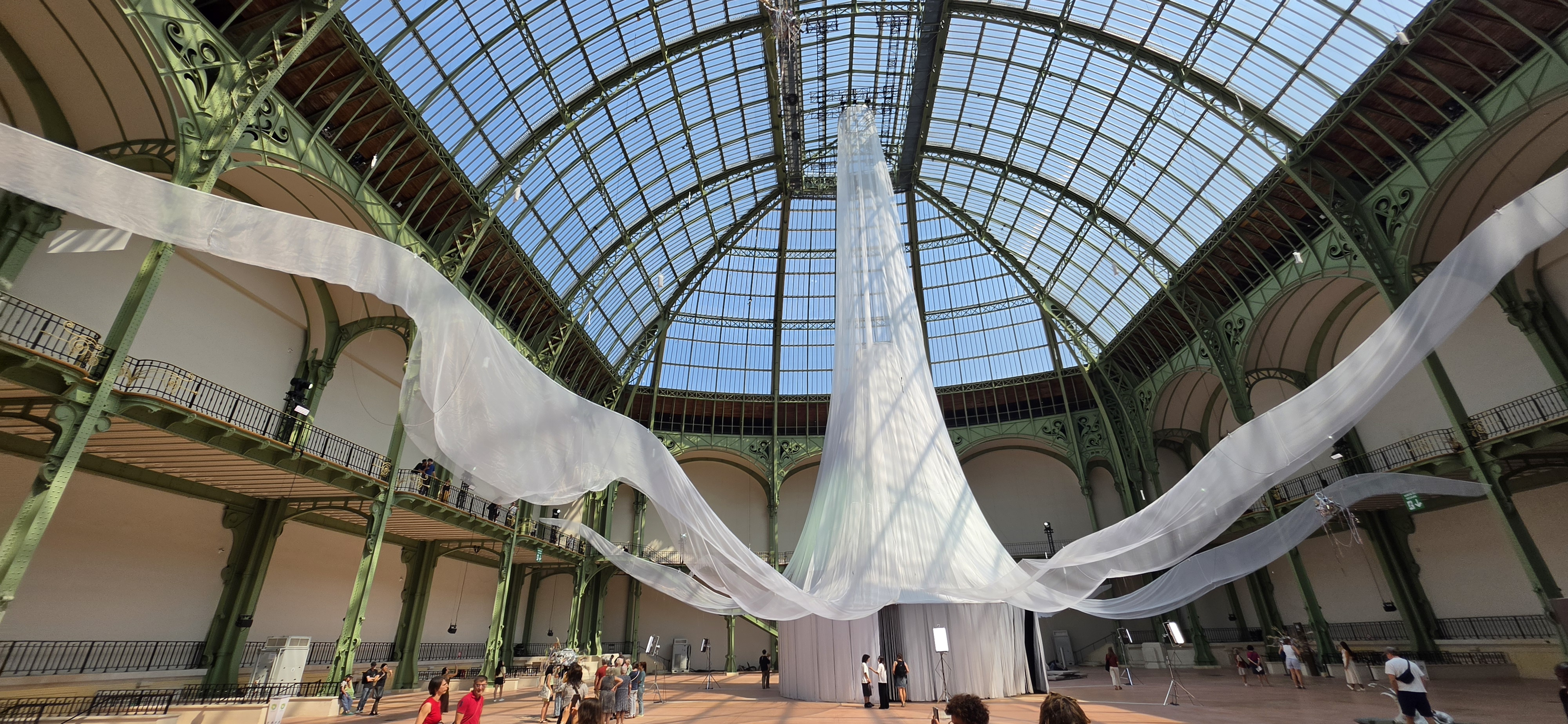
A 2026 installation in Paris's Grand Palais by Laure Prouvost related to quantum mechanics. It was titled, "Nous, frissons d'etoiles," or "We, starry-eyed thrills."

In 2014, Prouvost staged her first solo museum exhibition in the United States at the New Museum, titled For Forgetting.

In 2018, Prouvost created an installation for the Palais de Tokyo in Paris titled Ring Sing and drink for Trespassing.

In 2024, Prouvost was among the 18 artists selected by the Port Authority of New York and New Jersey to create installations for the John F. Kennedy International Airport’s new Terminal 6, set to open in 2026.

== Other activities ==
In 2018, Prouvost was a member of the jury that selected Helen Cammock as winner of the Max Mara Art Prize for Women.

== Personal life ==
Prouvost has three children. After living in the United Kingdom for 18 years, she moved to Antwerp in 2014. She lives and works in Molenbeek.

== Selected works ==
- 2007: Owt, video
- 2010: I need to take care of my conceptual Grand dad, video
- 2010: The Artist, video
- 2010: It Heat Hit, video
- 2011: The Wanderer, video
- 2012: Why does Gregor never rings, video installation
- 2013: Farfromwords: car mirrors eat raspberries when swimming through the sun, to swallow sweet smells, video installation
- 2013: Wantee, video installation
- 2014: Visitor center, video installation
- 2016: We would be floating away from the dirty past, video installation
- 2016: Lick in the Past, video
- 2017: Dit Learn, video
- 2019: Deep See Blue Surrounding You / Vois Ce Bleu Profond Te Fondre, in the French Pavilion at the 58th Venice Biennale
- 2020: Re-dit-en-un-in-learning, video
- 2021: Touching To Sea You Through Our Extremities, sculpture at La Panne, Triennial Beaufort (Beaufort21)
- 2022: Every Sunday, Grand Ma, video installation
- 2022: Four For See Beauties, video installation
- 2023: We Belong, facade of KANAL-Centre Pompidou, Bruxelles, Belgium
- 2023: No More Front Tears, video and box letters, video installation presented at Art Basel Parcours (2023), and Malta Biennale (2024)
- 2023 : Shadow Does, video installation
- 2023 : You, My, Omma, Mama, video installation

== Selected exhibitions ==
- 2012: The Hepworth Wakefield, Wakefield, United Kingdom
- 2013: Laure Prouvost / Adam Chodzko as part of Schwitters in Britain, Tate Britain, London, United Kingdom
- 2014: Laboratorio Arte Alameda, Mexico City, Mexico
- 2014: Laure Prouvost: For Forgetting, New Museum of Contemporary Art, New York
- 2015: Haus Der Kunst, Munich, Germany
- 2016: Red Brick Art Museum, Beijing, China
- 2016: Museum für Moderne Kunst Frankfurt Am Main, Frankfurt, Germany
- 2016: Kunstmuseum Luzern, Switzerland
- 2017: SALT Galata, Istanbul, Turkey
- 2018: BASS Museum, Miami, Florida, USA
- 2019: French Pavilion at the 58th Venice Biennale
- 2020: Included in NIRIN, the 22nd Biennale of Sydney
- 2020: Re-dit-en-un-in-learning CENTER at Lisson Gallery London
- 2020-2021: Deep See Blue Surrounding You / Vois ce bleu profond te fondre, LAM, Villeneuve d'Ascq
- 2021: Our elastic arm hold in tight through the claouds, Kunsthal Charlottenborg, Copenhagen, Denmark
- 2022: Deep Travel Ink, Atelier Hermès, Seoul, South Korea
- 2022: Laure Prouvost: Theatergarden and A Be(a)stiary of the Anthropocene, Longlati Foundation, Shanghai, China
- 2023: Above Front Tears Oui Float, at the Nasjonalmuseet, Oslo, Norway
- 2023: Ohmmm age Oma je ohomma mama, Kunsthalle Wien, Vienna, Austria
- 2023: Oma-je, Remai Modern, Saskatoon, Canada
- 2024: Above Front Tears Nest in South, Moody Center for the Arts, Houston, USA
- 2024: Darker, Lighter, Puffy, Flat, exposition de groupe, Kunsthalle Wien, Vienna, Austria
- 2024: In the Mist of It All, Above Front Tears, Musée De Pont, Tilburg, the Netherlands
- 2024: Oui Move in You, Australian Centre for Contemporary Art ACCA, Melbourne, Australia
- 2024: Deep Travel Ink., Travel Agency, Fosun Foundation, Chengdu, China
- 2024: Pulled Towards You, Lisson Gallery, Shanghai, China

== Permanent works ==
- 2021: In Your Own Time, tingalong, tingalong, Who's Been Here Since I've been gone?, Endless Express, Europalia Festival, Brussels-South station, Brussels, Belgium
- 2021: Touching to Sea You Through Our Extremities, Beaufort 21, Beaufort Biennale, De Panne, Belgium
- 2023: Oui Will Become One Another, Triennale Art & Industrie, Dunkirk, France

== Awards ==
- 2011: Max Mara Art Prize for Women
- 2013 : Turner Prize

Preceded by Elizabeth Price	Turner Prize winner 2013	Succeeded by Duncan Campbell
