= Emma Talbot =

English artist

- Born: Stourbridge, England
- Education: Birmingham Institute of Art and Design; Royal College of Art; British School at Rome
- Occupation: Artist
- Children: 2
- Website: www.emmatalbot.org.uk

Emma Talbot (born 1969, Stourbridge, Worcestershire) is an English artist who lives and works in Walthamstow, London and Italy

Talbot studied at the Birmingham Institute of Art and Design graduating with a BA Fine Art at (1991), followed by studies at the Royal College of Art, where she obtained an MA in Painting (1995), she was then a Rome Scholar at the British School at Rome (1996). She taught art at Northumbria University was a senior lecturer at Central Saint Martins, University of the Arts London, and has been an academic at the Royal College of Art.

In 2006 Talbot was widowed and has said that this experience influenced the nature of her work. In 2020 she won the Max Mara Art Prize for Women with a project based on the painting of Three Ages of Woman by Gustav Klimt, which is in the Galleria Nazionale d'Arte Moderna in Rome.

Talbot is a descendant of Jews who left Germany in the 1930s. She was married to the sculptor Paul Mason until he died of non-Hodgkin lymphoma in 2006; they had two sons. She now lives both in Reggio Emilia, Italy, and the United Kingdom.
