= Persistence (film) =

Persistence is a 2025 video art installation by Helen Cammock. It was displayed at the National Portrait Gallery in London from September 2025 until June 2026. It was removed from display due to controversy regarding the role of Winston Churchill in the Bengal famine of 1943.

== Description ==
Persistence was on a short term loan to the gallery. The creation of the piece had been commissioned by the gallery's Artists First: Contemporary Perspectives on Portraiture exhibition series in 2023 with support from Chanel's Culture Fund. It was displayed from September 2025 and was intended to be displayed until August 2026 before its removal in June.

The description of the work on the National Portrait Gallery website describes how Cammock asks "who has value and who has worth?" in relation to the gallery's "representation and celebration of well-known sitters" and aims to "speak to ideas around absence and presence and power". The description concludes by stating that portraiture is "at the heart of Cammock's layered images and voices in what she understands as a collective portrait focused on the 'reimagining, retelling and recentering' of absence".

The work features Ada Lovelace, Charlotte Mew and Ethel Smyth in addition to found footage. Persistence was filmed in the collection rooms and archives of the gallery and various exterior locales. The work is narrated by Cammock. It is 40 minutes in duration.

== Reference to Winston Churchill ==
Discussing the Cromwellian conquest of Ireland, the work features the line "he starved people, en masse, a little like the wilful starvation of the Indian population by Winston Churchill". This is in reference to Winston Churchill and the Bengal famine of 1943. 50 members of the peerage signed a letter protesting the work. The letter was sent to the board of the gallery by the historian Lord Andrew Roberts. Churchill's grandson Nicholas Soames was among the signatories. Roberts described the reference as an "ideologically motivated rant". The gallery was not aware of any other complaints about the piece before the letter from the peers.

The work was subsequently removed from display at the request of Cammock. Cammock said in a statement following the removal that there was "an incredible pressure on artists and arts institutions to bend to external pressure; to be benign at best and silent at worst. I do not accept this pressure. To question, challenge and explore ideas and histories is vital to a healthy society and art is intrinsic to this". The gallery said that they respected her decision and acknowledged the opinions of those who were offended "by what was said in the film". The gallery said that Persistence was presented as "as an artistic piece, not a documentary" and that it had been created as part of a project to give artists the chance to create works in response to their collection.

== See also ==
- Historiography of the Bengal famine of 1943
