= Andrea Büttner =

German artist (born 1972)

- Born: 1972 (age 53–54); Stuttgart, West Germany (now Germany)
- Education: Berlin University of the Arts (Masters, 2000), Humboldt University (Masters, 2003), Royal College of Art (Ph.D., 2010)
- Known for: Painting, sculpture, woodcuts, and video

Andrea Büttner (born 1972) is a German artist. She works in a variety of media including woodcuts, reverse glass paintings, sculpture, video, and performance. She creates connections between art history and social or ethical issues, with a particular interest in notions of poverty, shame, vulnerability and dignity, and the belief systems that underpin them.

Büttner has exhibited in both Europe and North America. Currently, she lives and works in both London and Frankfurt am Main. Büttner uses a broad range of media and techniques most notably video, performance, and installation art. However, her work is not limited to these mediums as she utilizes collage, sculpture, and more to discuss myths, gender, religion, shame, and society.

== Life and work ==
Born in 1972 in Stuttgart, Andrea Büttner studied fine art at the Berlin University of the Arts. From 2003 to 2004, she studied at the University of Tübingen and Humboldt University, where she received a master's degree in art history and philosophy. From 2005 to 2010, she joined the Royal College of Art in London and received her doctorate. Her thesis "Aesthetics of Shame: The relevance of shame for contemporary art and visual culture" focused on the subject of shame, including its queer aspects, as an aesthetic feeling.

Religion is a recurring theme in her work, from her video Little Sisters: Lunapark Ostia (2012), which documents Büttner in conversation with religious sisters. The video features nuns in an amusement park outside of Rome partaking in rides and attractions while discussing their own work. Little Sisters: Lunapark Ostia (2012) is not Büttner's only work to feature nuns, her short film Little Works (2007) features nuns making small objects, such as candles. Büttner's other work Vogelpredigt (Sermon to the Birds, 2010) reflects Christian iconography.

== Exhibitions ==
=== Selected solo shows ===
- 2007 - On the spot #1, Badischer Kunstverein, Karlsruhe, Germany
- 2008 - Nought to Sixty – Andrea Büttner, Institute of Contemporary Arts, London
- 2009 - Andrea Büttner, Croy Nielsen, Berlin, Germany
- 2011 - The Poverty of Riches, Whitechapel Gallery, London / Collezione Maramotti, Reggio Emilia, Italy
- 2012 - Andrea Büttner, International Project Space, Birmingham, UK
- 2013 - Andrea Büttner, MK Gallery, Milton Keynes, UK
- 2014 - Piano Destructions, Walter Phillips Gallery, The Banff Centre, Banff, Canada
- 2014 - BP Spotlight: Andrea Büttner, Tate Britain, London
- 2014 - Andrea Büttner. 2, Museum Ludwig, Cologne, Germany
- 2015 - Andrea Büttner, Walker Art Center, Minneapolis, USA
- 2016 - Beggars and iPhones, Kunsthalle Wien, Vienna, Austria
- 2017 - Andrea Büttner «Gesamtzusammenhang», St. Gallen, Switzerland

== Awards ==
- 2005 - British Institution Award, London
- 2009 - Maria Sibylla Merian Prize, Wiesbaden
- 2009 - Kunststiftung Baden-Württemberg Grant
- 2009-2011 - MaxMara Art Prize, organized by Collezione Maramotti
- 2012 - 1822-Kunstpreis, Frankfurt am Main
- 2017 - Turner Prize Nominee, London

== See also ==
- List of German women artists
