= Oscar Murillo (artist) =

Colombian artist (born 1986)

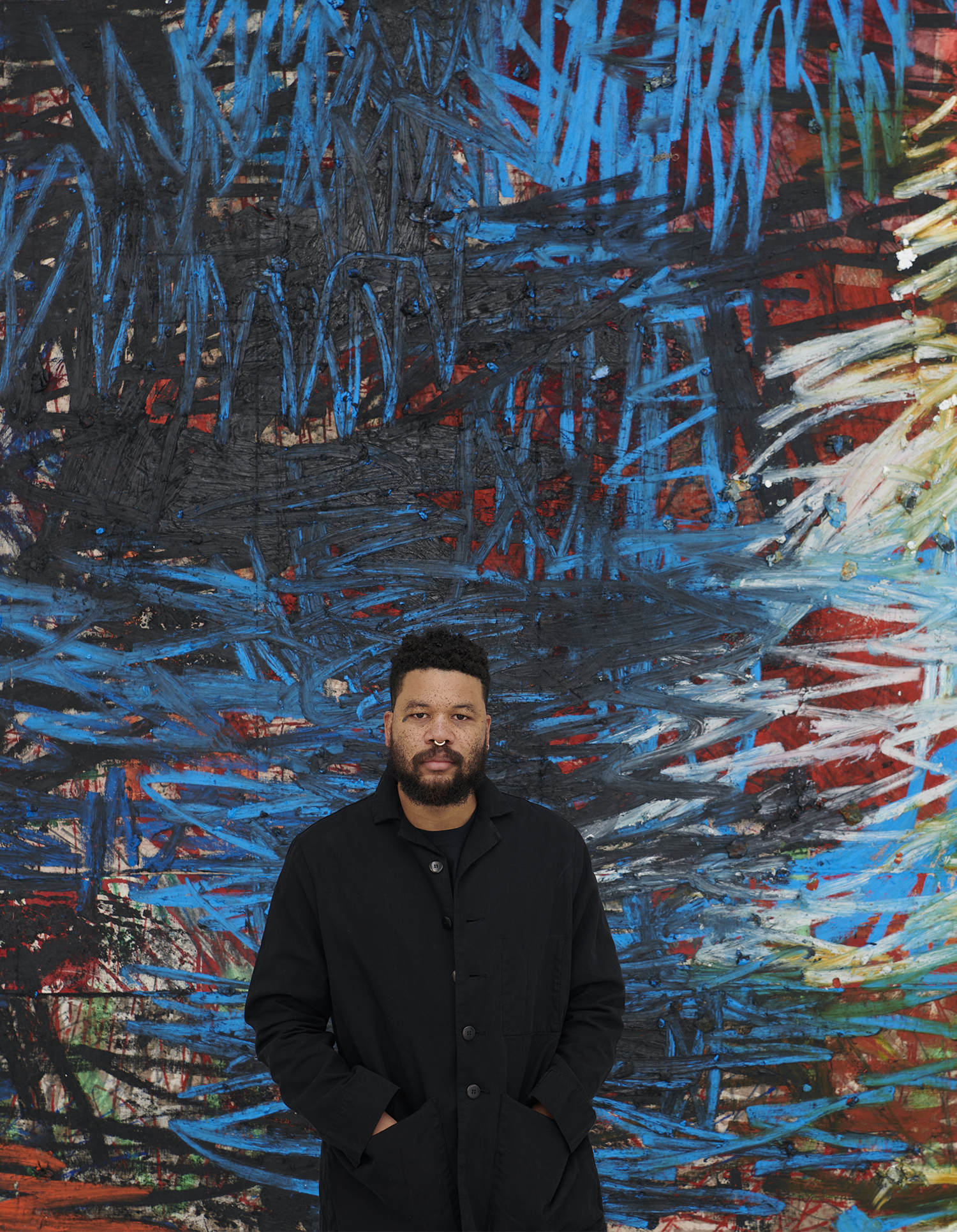
- Murillo in 2022
- Born: 1986 (age 38–39); La Paila, Valle del Cauca, Colombia

Oscar Murillo (born 1986) is a Colombian artist working within the painting tradition. He currently lives and works in various locations.

Curator and writer Legacy Russell has said that the artist explores "the body in transit", while curator Hans-Ulrich Obrist has spoken of a "blurring […] between art and life" occurring in Murillo’s multidisciplinary works.

In 2019, he co-won the Turner Prize after requesting with his fellow nominees (Tai Shani, Helen Cammock, and Lawrence Abu Hamdan) that the jury award the prize for the first time to all four nominated artists.

== Early life and education ==
Murillo was born and spent the first ten years of his life in La Paila, a small town in the Valle del Cauca Department of Colombia, and one of the country's largest producer's of sugarcane. His parents moved to London when he was 10 years old. He attended the state comprehensive school Cardinal Pole Catholic School in Hackney, returning in 2021 to exhibit there as part of his Frequencies project. His early life has influenced much of the artist’s later work, particularly the artist’s engagement with ideas of labour, globalisation, and material conditions.

In 2007, Murillo earned his BA (Hons) in Fine Art at University of Westminster. After graduating, he worked as a teacher in a secondary school. In 2012, Murillo graduated from the Royal College of Art in London, with an MA in Fine Art. Living in East London, he often worked as an installer for the neighbourhood’s small galleries.

== Work ==
Oscar Murillo works across painting, installation, and performance, often using draped black canvases, large-scale paintings composed of stitched-together fragments, and metal structures evoking autopsy tables and rock-like sculptures formed of corn and clay. His practice can be understood as a sustained and evolving investigation of community, informed by his cross-cultural personal ties between Colombia and the UK.

His work has been compared to that of Alberto Burri, Philip Guston, and the Abstract Expressionists for its use of colour, line, and physicality. Major bodies of work include his News series, the Manifestation series, and the Surge works, all of which combine expressive mark-making with scale and colour.

Murillo's studio-based works are fundamentally tied to the environment where he produces them:

I came to the realisation that I was interested in too many things at once. Somehow the studio floor was the only available tool to communicate these interests. […] One tutor from art school once said that the way I made work, or treated the studio, reminded her of when she was growing up in post-war Britain because then there was this idea that you had to be resourceful. I grew up as a child in a village in Colombia, where there was a very similar attitude to just using what was around.

— Oscar Murillo, from interview with Hans Ulrich Obrist published in Work (Rubell Family Collection: 2012)

Since 2013, through his ongoing collaborative project Frequencies, Murillo has worked with schools across the globe, placing pieces of raw canvas on schools students' desks and inviting them to draw and write on, mark and illustrate them. To date, thousands of students, primarily aged 10 to 16, have participated. The canvases are added to a growing archive, selections of which have been exhibited at the 56th Venice Biennale, Italy, the 2nd Hangzhou Triennial of Fiber Art 2016, China and 3rd Aichi Triennial, Japan, and with arts organisation Artangel in 2021. Speaking about the project, Murillo has said ‘The idea is to let these kids explore in the intimate reality of the school desk, to make marks of their own desires’. To date, the project has produced 50,000 canvases from 36 different countries. The project has formed the basis for a number of Murillo’s paintings and further projects, such as his Disrupted Frequencies canvases.

Another ongoing theme throughout Murillo's work concerns postcolonial and socioeconomic disparities. In his work The Coming of the Europeans (2017), a large-scale banner conceived for the inaugural Kathmandu Triennale in the same year, he commented on the continuing legacy of colonialism in present-day international fairs. The artist often invites contrasting socio-economic tensions within his work. In 2012, Murillo held a party for the cleaners at the Serpentine Galleries; in 2014, the artist brought Colombian factory workers to perform labour in a New York gallery space, and, at a residency in a collector’s home in Rio de Janeiro the same year, himself working alongside domestic staff and exhibiting white overalls dirtied by his exertion.

== Exhibitions ==
Murillo’s recent solo exhibitions include A Storm Is Blowing From Paradise at the Scuola Grande della Misericordia in Venice, Italy; Currents 121: Oscar Murillo, at Saint Louis Art Museum, US (both 2022); Social Cataracts at KM21, The Hague, Netherlands; Spirits and Gestures at Fondazione Memmo, Rome, Italy; Condiciones aún por titular at the Museum of Art of the National University of Colombia, Bogotá (all 2021-22); Frequencies, organised by Artangel at Cardinal Pole Catholic School, London; and MAM Project 029: Oscar Murillo, Mori Art Museum, Tokyo, Japan (all 2021).

The artist’s Past solo exhibitions include at the Aspen Art Museum, US; Kunstverein in Hamburg, Germany (both 2019-20); Kettle’s Yard, Cambridge, UK; K11 Art Museum, Shanghai, China (both 2019); Haus der Kunst, Munich, Germany (2017-18); Yarat Contemporary Art Centre, Baku, Azerbaijan (2016-7); Museo de Arte de la Universidad Nacional de Colombia, Bogotá; Centro Cultural Daoíz y Velarde, Madrid, Spain; Performa 15, New York, US and Artpace, San Antonio, US (all 2015); The Mistake Room, Los Angeles, US (2014) and South London Gallery, UK (2013).

The artist has also participated in numerous international group exhibitions and biennials, including the Sharjah Biennial 13 (2017) and the 56th Venice Biennale (2015).

== Collections ==
Work by Oscar Murillo is included in museum collections worldwide, including:

- Pérez Art Museum Miami, Florida
- Arts Council Collection, England
- The Broad, Los Angeles
- Dallas Art Museum, Dallas
- Fondazione Prada, Milan
- Fondazione Sandretto Re Rebaudengo, Turin
- Kettle’s Yard, University of Cambridge, England
- Moderna Museet, Stockholm
- The Museum of Contemporary Art, Los Angeles
- Museum Ludwig, Cologne
- The Museum of Modern Art, New York
- Rubell Family Collection, Miami
- Stedelijk Museum voor Actuele Kunst (S.M.A.K.), Ghent
- Taguchi Art Collection, Tokyo

== Other activities ==
- Zeitz Museum of Contemporary Art Africa, Member of the Global Council

== Art market ==
In February 2013, London auctions at Sotheby's, Christie's and Phillips all included Murillo’s work. Artnet estimates that 24 Murillo pieces generated a total of $4.8 million at auction that year. In 2013 Untitled (Drawings off the wall), sold at Phillips New York for the record price of 401,000 USD.

Murillo is represented by Carlos Ishikawa (London), Isabella Bortolozzi Galerie (Berlin), Taka Ishi Gallery (Tokyo), Kurimanzutto (New York, Mexico City) and David Zwirner (London, New York, Paris, Hong Kong).
