= Emma Hart (artist) =

English artist

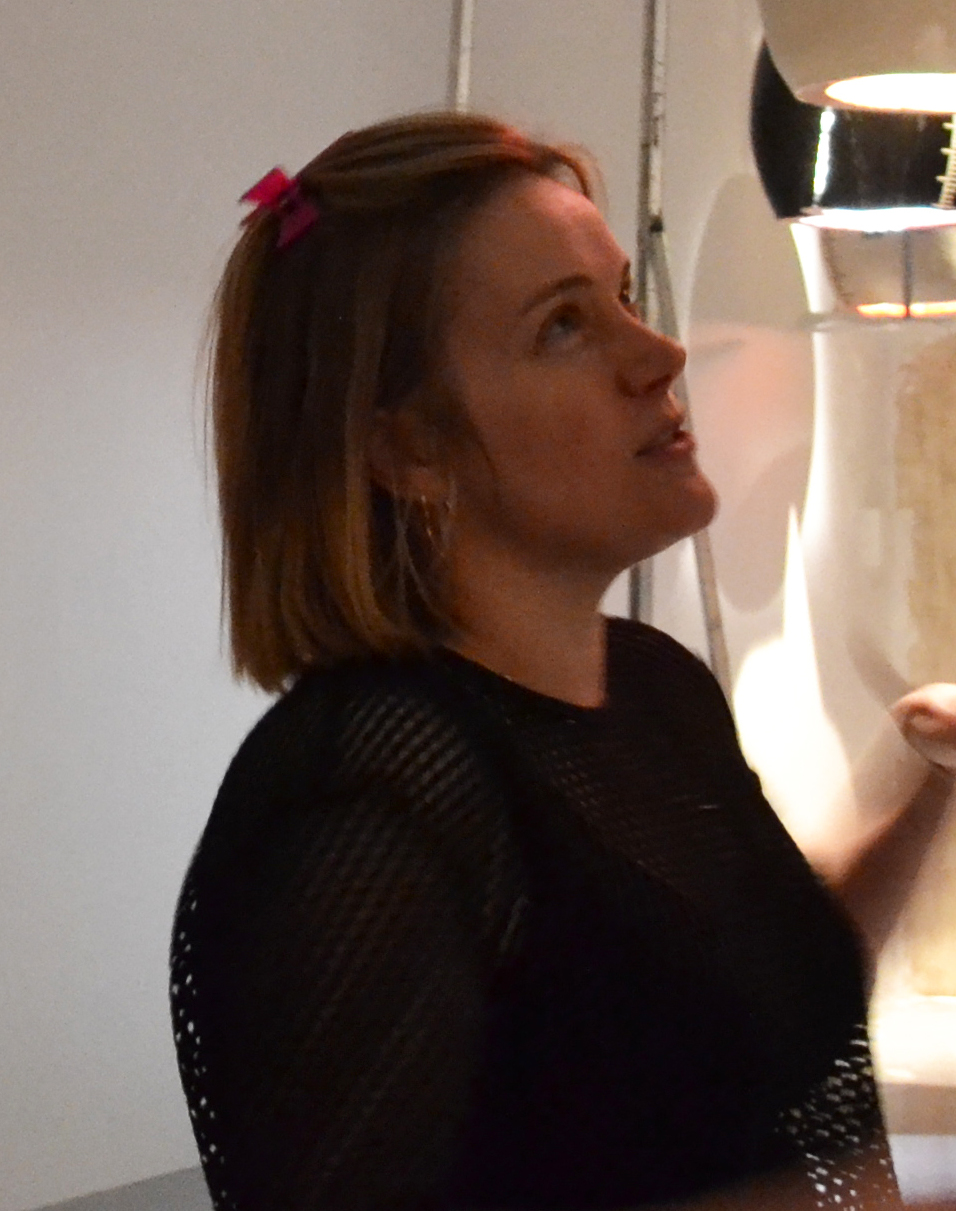
- Born: 1974 (age 51–52); London, United Kingdom
- Occupations: Artist and lecturer
- Employer: Central Saint Martins
- Website: emmahart.info

Emma Hart (born 1974) is an English artist who works in a number of disciplines, including video art, installation art, sculpture, and film. She lives and works in London, where she is a lecturer at Slade School of Art.

In 2016, she was the winner of the Max Mara Art Prize for Women.

== Early life and education ==
Hart studied Fine Art at Slade School of Fine Art, graduating with an MA in 2004, and completed a PhD in Fine Art in 2013 from Kingston University.

== Career ==
Hart's art has been exhibited both in traditional gallery spaces and unconventional spaces such as "a semi-derelict flat above an abandoned frame-maker's shop" in Folkestone, as part of the 2014 Folkestone Triennial. Her artwork addresses questions of social class, familial behaviour, and the connections between relatives. Hart's initial training was in photography, but she has gradually focused more and more on sculptures using ceramics. She has also evoked her own life in her art: Dirty Looks, a 2013 exhibit at London's Camden Arts Centre, incorporated references to a job she once had working at a call center.

Upon winning the Max Mara Art Prize for Women in 2016, Hart embarked on a six-month-long residency in Italy, which was her first time spending more than three weeks outside of London.

A book accompanying her exhibit Banger at the Fruitmarket Gallery in Edinburgh included a short story by experimental fiction writer Ali Smith.

== Selected exhibitions ==
=== Solo ===
- TO DO, Matt's Gallery, London, 28 September–20 November
- Dirty Looks, Camden Arts Centre, London 26 July - 29 September 2013
- Mamma Mia!, Whitechapel Gallery, London 12 July - 3 September 2017
- BANGER, The Fruitmarket Gallery, Edinburgh, 27 October 2018 - 3 February 2019

=== Group ===
- The World Turned Upside Down, Mead Gallery, Coventry, 2013
- Bloody English, OHWOW Gallery, Los Angeles, 2013
- Folkestone Triennial, 2014
