= Tai Shani =

British artist

- Born: 10 June 1976 (age 50); London, England
- Known for: Installation, Performance, Film, Image, Photography, Writing, and Poetry.
- Awards: Turner Prize, 2019

Tai Shani (born 10 June 1976) is a British artist. Shani uses performance, film, photography, sculptural installations and experimental texts to explore forgotten histories and stories. She is currently a Tutor in Contemporary Art Practice at the Royal College of Art. Shani was born in London.

In 2019, her work DC: SEMIRAMIS commissioned by Glasgow International (May–April 2018) and The Tetley, Leeds (July–October 2018), and her participation in Still I Rise: Feminisms, Gender, Resistance at Nottingham Contemporary and the De Le Warr Pavilion, Bexhill-on-Sea, was nominated for the Turner Prize. She was awarded the Prize, along with three other artists, after jointly requesting from the jury that all four artists win "in the name of commonality, multiplicity and solidarity".

Shani has spoken about the inaccessibility of performance art, as well as against cuts to arts funding and the increasingly "expansionist, market and state-driven managerial approach within museums and galleries", expressing solidarity with striking arts workers during the 2020 pandemic.

== DC: Productions ==
DC: Productions, which formed part of her 2019 Turner Prize installation at the Turner Contemporary, is inspired by the 15th-century protofeminist text The Book of the City of Ladies by Christine de Pizan. The title "DC: Productions" alludes to Freud's description of feminine sexuality, with DC short for ‘Dark Continent’. The White Review dubbed Shani's reimagining of the story as a "feminist science fiction".

Shani's debut book, Our Fatal Magic (ISBN 9781907222818), collects texts from the DC Productions project. The book moves between "genres of horror, sci-fi, and smut, all produced with pulp".

== Selected other works ==
'Moans of approaching Death from unsatisfied Desire and other physical manifestations of Lovesickness', performed by Francesca Cluny at Tate Modern, 24 June 2016, within the Painting With Light exhibition.

Tai Shani collaborated with Let's Eat Grandma and Maya Lubinsky to produce "Mystical Best Friend, A Miracle Play" as part of the Miracle Marathon festival at the Serpentine Sackler Gallery 8–9 Oct 2016.

In 2019–2020 Rafael Barber Cortell at CentroCentro, Madrid, Spain, commissioned Shani and Florence Peake to produce work as a pair as part of the curatorial project Absolute Beginners. Shani and Peake built upon their collaborative piece Andromedan Sad Girl, which was presented for the first time at Wysing Arts Centre in 2017. The work seeks to "imagine fluid mythologies capable of representing non-hierarchical civilizations through a series of sculptures and mural paintings".

Shani was commissioned along with her fellow Turner Prize winners Lawrence Abu Hamdan, Helen Cammock, and Oscar Murillo to create a site specific piece at the Anteros statue, Picadilly Circus, London UK. However, the project did not come to fruition after organisers rejected the mentions of Palestine in the proposed work. Shani writes that the artists were responding to the history of the statue: "built in the late nineteenth century, [it] commemorates the 7th Earl of Shaftesbury, who was instrumental in the colonisation of Palestine". Shani has further written on how the art world can adopt techniques of boycott, divestment, and sanctions to support Palestine.

In 2025, Shani presented The Spell or The Dream at Somerset House, London, a ten-metre-tall sculpture of a reclining blue figure encased in a glass vitrine. The work was accompanied by The Dream Radio, a temporary broadcast featuring contributions from artists, writers, and academics including Yanis Varoufakis, Brian Eno, Hannah Black, and the Palestinian Sound Archive.

== Awards ==
Tai Shani and her fellow shortlisted artists Lawrence Abu Hamdan, Helen Cammock, and Oscar Murillo were jointly awarded the Turner Prize in 2019 after they wrote to the judges as a collective. In their letter the artists explained their decision: "The politics we deal with differ greatly, and for us it would feel problematic if they were pitted against each other, with the implication that one was more important, significant or more worthy of attention than the others."

== Personal life ==
Shani was born in the UK. She was raised in Goa, India, before moving to Brussels to attend a private school at the age of 12. She is of Jewish descent.
