= Lawrence Abu Hamdan =

Contemporary artist based in Beirut

- لورانس أبو حمدان
- Born: 1985 (age 40–41); Amman, Jordan
- Education: Goldsmiths, University of London
- Known for: audio, listening
- Website: LawrenceAbuHamdan.com

Lawrence Abu Hamdan (born 1985, Amman) is a contemporary artist based in Dubai. His work looks into the political effects of listening, using various kinds of audio to explore its effects on human rights and law. Because of his work with sound, Abu Hamdan has testified as an expert witness in asylum hearings in the United Kingdom.

His work has been featured in major group exhibitions, as well as solo exhibitions at Tate Modern, Witte de With Center for Contemporary Art or The Showroom, and is included in the collection of several major institutions.

He jointly won, with Tai Shani, Oscar Murillo and Helen Cammock, the 2019 Turner Prize for his work based on interviews with former detainees at a Syrian prison. In 2023 he founded Earshot, "the first agency for sound and acoustic analysis dedicated to open-source investigators and the field of human rights."

== Early life and education ==
Born in Amman, Jordan to a Lebanese father and an English mother, Abu Hamdan grew up in York, attending Bootham School, a private day & boarding school in the UK. In the 2000s he played in a series of DIY bands, including Isambard Kingston Brunel, Poltergroom and Cleckhuddersfax, who released records on the London-based label Upset The Rhythm. Abu Hamdan received his PhD from the Centre for Research Architecture at Goldsmiths, University of London in 2017.

== Career and artwork ==
Abu Hamdan describes his work as concerned with the "politics of listening." Describing himself as a "private ear", his work confronts specific instances and examples of listening and the voice as they related to legal and political contexts. In his 2012 radio documentary The Whole Truth, he explored new technologies that were attempting to act as lie-detectors for voices. In a 2015 commission for The Armory Show in New York, he distributed bags of potato chips in foil wrappers. The work built on research undertaken by scientists at the Massachusetts Institute of Technology in which they were able to turn common objects into listening devices by capturing vibrations recorded on physical objects and transferring them back into speech. His audio investigations have been used as evidence in UK asylum and immigration courts, and in support of organisations such as Amnesty International and Child Protection International, as well as researchers in forensic architecture. He keeps an Earwitness Inventory, which he has described as "both a sound-effects library specifically designed to solicit earwitness testimony for legal and advocacy cases as well as a repository for acoustic experience." In September 2026, Abu Hamdan staged a 4 day takeover of the Barbican Centre in London, Repercussions, exhibiting works and events concerning his work as a 'Private Ear'. This included the film 450XL: A silent movie surrounding the purported use of a sonic weapon by the Serbian government against protestors in 2025, and Zifzafa, a video installation exploring the effects of a planned wind farm on the Jawlani community in the Israeli occupied Golan Heights in Syria.

He has won awards including the 2016 Nam June Paik New Media Award, the 2020 Edvard Munch Award, and the 2019 Turner Prize, which he won jointly with Helen Cammock, Oscar Murillo and Tai Shani. He has held solo exhibitions at multiple institutions including Tate Modern (2018), Hammer Museum (2018) and Witte de With Center for Contemporary Art (2019), and his work is in the collections of the Museum of Modern Art, Guggenheim, Arts Council England, Van Abbe, Centre Pompidou, Museo Reina Sofía and Tate Modern.

Abu Hamdan is a fellow at the University of Chicago, was a guest at the DAAD Artists Program in Berlin in 2017–18, and was a fellow at the Vera List Center for Art and Politics at the New School in New York from 2015 to 2017.

Lawrence Abu Hamdan is represented by Galerie Mor Charpentier, Paris.

== Major works ==
- The Whole Truth (2012).
- Saydnaya (The Missing 19db) (2017).
- After SFX (2018).
- Walled Unwalled (2018).

== Exhibitions ==
=== Solo exhibitions ===
- 2012: Aural Contract: The Freedom of Speech Itself, The Showroom, London
- 2014: Tape Echo, part of Positions, Van Abbemuseum, Eindhoven
- 2015. Taqiyya, Kunsthalle St. Gallen
- 2016: Earshot, Portikus, Frankfurt
- 2018: Hammer Projects: Lawrence Abu Hamdan, Hammer Museum, Los Angeles
- 2018: Walled Unwalled, Tate Modern, London
- 2018: Earwitness Theatre, Chisenhale Gallery, London
- 2019: Lawrence Abu Hamdan, a solo exhibition, Witte de With Center for Contemporary Art, Rotterdam
- 2019: Lawrence Abu Hamdan, Sfeir-Semler Gallery, Beirut
- 2019: Lawrence Abu Hamdan (Witte de With – Center for Contemporary Art, Rotterdam)
- 2019: Earwitness Theatre (Institute of Modern Art, Brisbane)
- 2019: Naqt (Sfeir-Semler Gallery, Beirut)
- 2019: The Voice Before the Law (Hamburger Bahnhof – Museum für Gegenwart, Berlin)
- 2020: Artist's Rooms: Lawrence Abu Hamdan (Jameel Arts Centre, Dubai)
- 2021: São Paulo Art Biennial (São Paulo)
- 2021: Dirty Evidence (Bonniers Konsthall, Stockholm)
- 2021: Green Coconuts and Other Inadmissible Evidence (Secession, Vienna)
- 2022: cross border crimes & the witness-machine complex (Sfeir-Semler Gallery, Hamburg)
- 2022: The Sonic Image (Sharjah Art Foundation, Sharjah)
- 2023: Cross-Border Crimes (Museo Universitario Arte Contemporáneo, Mexico City)
- 2023: Walled Unwalled and Other Monologues (Museum of Modern Art, New York)
- 2023: 45th Parallel (Talbot Rice Gallery, Edinburgh)

=== Group exhibitions ===
- British Art Show 8 (2015–17).
- Liverpool Biennial (2016).
- 3rd New Museum Triennial (2015).
- May You Live in Interesting Times, 58th Venice Biennale, Venice (2019).

== Publications ==
- Hamdan, Lawrence (2016). Lawrence Abu Hamdan : (inaudible) : a politics of listening in 4 acts. Berlin: Sternberg Press. ISBN 978-3-95679-241-0. OCLC 965200118.

== Awards and fellowships ==
- Vera List Center Fellow, New School, New York (2015–17)
- Nam June Paik Award (2016)
- DAAD Visual Artists Residency (2017)
- Abraaj Group Art Prize (2018)
- 20th Baloise Art Prize (2018)
- Turner Prize (2019)
- Edvard Munch Award (2020)
- Audience Prize of the Toronto Biennale (2022)
- Glasgow Short Film Festival: Bill Douglas Award (2023)
