= Edgar Calel =

Maya-Kaqchikel artist

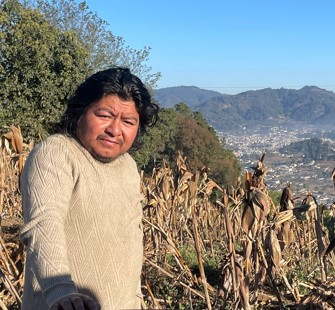
Edgar Calel in Chi Xot, San Juan Comalapa, Guatemala

Edgar Calel (b. 1987) is a Maya-Kaqchikel visual artist and poet from Chi Xot, San Juan Comalapa, Guatemala. Calel is known for multimedia contemporary art that explores the complexities of indigenous experiences and engages with the Maya-Kaqchikel cosmic worldview, traditions, and rituals to new publics internationally. Calel's artwork has been exhibited in exhibitions and galleries in Europe and North America, including the Helsinki Biennial, Liverpool Biennial, Berlin Biennale, Tate Modern, the Carnegie Museum of Art, the Sculpture Center, Museo Nacional Centro de Arte Reina Sofía, and the National Gallery of Canada, with his works featuring in the national collections of the UK and Canada, among other countries. In 2023, Calel was included in Phaidon Press's Latin American Artists: From 1785 to Now.

== Biography ==
Edgar Calel was born in 1987 in Chi Xot, San Juan Comalapa, an indigenous Maya Kaqchikel community in the highlands of Guatemala. At age 19, Calel received a scholarship to study at the Escuela Nacional de Artes Plásticas "Rafael Rodríguez Padilla" in Guatemala City.

Following his studies at ENAP, Calel traveled throughout Central America developing his practice. In 2008, Calel was invited to a residency program at the Escuela de Arte Espira/La Espora in Managua, Nicaragua. From there, he went on to further residencies throughout Latin America, including in Córdoba, Argentina and Belo Horizonte, Brazil.

Calel is associated with a broader collective of Guatemalan artists, many represented by Proyectos Ultravioleta, and is considered a leader of a new wave of institutional critique that has garnered media attention for their artistic responses to power dynamics and historical shifts, contributing to the visibility of a generation of indigenous Guatemalan artists on the international stage.

== Work ==
Calel works as a poet and multimedia artist with a focus on the ancestral culture and indigenous experience of the Maya Kaqchikel community. His work is noted for incorporating the Kaqchikel spirituality, rituals, and communal practices and using contemporary art to transmit these aspects to a wider public. His works often draw attention to the violence, racial discrimination, and exclusion faced by indigenous communities in modern Guatemala, particularly in the course and aftermath of the Guatemalan Civil War.

In 2021, Calel gained attention for his novel approach to art custodianship in his installation "'Ru k’ox k’ob’el jun ojer etemab’el' (The Echo of an Ancient Form of Knowledge)." Recognizing that the installation, which incorporates Maya-Kaqchikel rituals blessings, cannot be reduced to its physical form, the Tate worked with Calel to establish a unique custodial agreement in which the Tate acquired the installation, without owning it outright, for a period of 13 years (a number corresponding to the 13 joints of the human body in the Mayan cosmic worldview). Speaking on the acquisition of Calel's installation, Gregor Muir, Tate's Director of Collection, said:

"Functioning like altarpieces on which we see sacrificial fruits and vegetables, his arrangement of rocks with all their associated rituals challenge the very concept of what it is to own something. The work purposely asks us to redefine collecting through a custodial agreement whereby the Tate retains a direct line to the artist and the Maya community. While we can never own Calel’s installation, we have much to learn from its intrinsic questioning."

According to a statement by Tate, once this 13-year custodianship of the work ends, "a new agreement will be made with the artist and his community, either to renew this custodianship, to pass it on to another institution, or to return the elements of the work to the earth." Calel's custodianship model has since garnered attentionfrom The Art Newspaper’s chief contributing editor, Gareth Harris and others, as a promising alternative for ethical museum and curatorial conduct.

In the 2023 Liverpool Biennial, Calel worked alongside other artists from the global south, exhibiting art that responded to the city of Liverpool's role in the transatlantic slave trade. Calel spoke of his work acting "as a form of resistance in the wake of ongoing racism, social exclusion and cultural erasure of Indigenous people."
