= Lena Herzog =

Russian-American artist and photographer (born 1970)

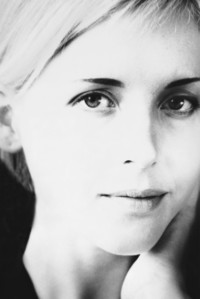
- Born: Elena Pisetski; 1970 (age 55–56); Sverdlovsk, Russian SFSR, Soviet Union
- Other name: Elena Herzog
- Citizenship: United States (since 1999)
- Education: Leningrad University; Mills College
- Occupations: Visual artist; photographer
- Years active: 1997–present
- Notable work: Tauromaquia, Flamenco, Pilgrims, Lost Souls
- Spouse: Werner Herzog (m. 1999)
- Website: lenaherzog.com

Elena Herzog (née Pisetski; born 1970) is a Russian-American visual artist and photographer.

== Early life ==
Elena Pisetski was born in 1970 in Sverdlovsk, Russian SFSR (present-day Yekaterinburg, Russia). In 1987, Herzog moved to Leningrad (now St. Petersburg) to attend the Philological Faculty of Leningrad University, where she studied languages (English and Spanish) and literature. In 1990, she emigrated to the United States and graduated with a degree in philosophy from Mills College, specializing in the history and philosophy of science. Herzog was also a research consultant at Stanford University.

== Career ==
She started taking photographs in 1997 and studied photographic printing techniques with Italian printer Ivan Dalla Tana in Milan and later with French printer Marc Valesella. Herzog combines some of the very early photographic darkroom processes with contemporary ones and her own techniques to achieve her desired effects.

Herzog's work ranges from classical documentary to the experimental and conceptual and has been published and reviewed in The New Yorker, The New York Times, The Los Angeles Times, The Paris Review, Harper’s Magazine, El País, El Mundo The Believer, The British Journal of Photography, and Cabinet, among others. Her work has been exhibited at the Los Angeles County Museum of Art, Pasadena Museum of California Art, Yerba Buena Center for the Arts (San Francisco), the International Center of Photography (New York), and the British Museum, among others.

Her book Strandbeest: the Dream Machines of Theo Jansen was published by TASCHEN in 2014. Herzog has authored six books / monographs of photography.

In 2016, Herzog's complex video/audio installation Last Whispers: Oratorio for Vanishing Voices, Collapsing Universes and a Falling Tree, in which she collaborated with composer and director Marco Capalbo and sound designer Mark Mangini, premiered at the British Museum in the Living and Dying Gallery adjacent to the Rosetta Stone. A film and surround-sound experience that incorporates archival recordings of endangered languages, Last Whispers began a world tour in 2019.

== Personal life ==
Herzog is an American citizen, naturalized in 1999. Since 1995, she has lived in California with her husband, German filmmaker Werner Herzog. They have collaborated on several projects including a book of stills from the film Bad Lieutenant: Port of Call New Orleans which was published by Rizzoli in 2009. Werner Herzog wrote the introduction to Lena's book Pilgrims, which was released in 2002.

== Bibliography ==
=== Books ===
- Strandbeest. The Dream Machines of Theo Jansen ISBN 978-3-8365-4849-6 (2014)
- Lost Souls ISBN 978-0-9825908-0-5 (2010)
- Bad Lieutenant ISBN 978-0-7893-2013-1 (2009)
- Flamenco: Dance Class ISBN 1-902699-44-0
- Tauromaquia: The Art of Bullfighting ISBN 1-902699-23-8
- Pilgrims ISBN 1-902699-43-2 (2002)

=== Exhibitions ===
- Panoramas, Fahey / Klein Gallery, Los Angeles (2012)
- Lost Souls, International Center of Photography (2010)
- The Circle of Bliss, Los Angeles County Museum of Art (2003)
- Reflecting Buddha, Pasadena Museum of California Art (2003)
- Ensayo, (multimedia show) Yerba Buena Center of the Performing Arts, San Francisco (2003)
- Flamenco, Foyles Gallery, London (2003)
- Tauromaquia, Museum of Carruajes, Seville, Spain (2002)
- Below Zero, Focus Gallery, San Francisco (2000)
- Black and White Photographs from Andalucia and Shinxiang, Focus Gallery, San Francisco (1998)
