= Max Mara Art Prize for Women =

The Max Mara Art Prize for Women is a biennial arts prize awarded to a young female artist working in the United Kingdom. It is organized by the Max Mara fashion company and the Whitechapel Gallery in London. The prize includes a six-month residency in Italy, during which the artist creates an art project to be exhibited at the Whitechapel Gallery and at the Collezione Maramotti in Reggio Emilia, in Emilia-Romagna in northern Italy.

Between 2006 and 2020 the winners of the prize were Margaret Salmon, Hannah Rickards, Andrea Büttner, Laure Prouvost, Corin Sworn, Emma Hart, Helen Cammock and Emma Talbot.

== See also ==
- List of European art awards
- List of awards honoring women
