= Peefeeyatko =

- Directed by: Henning Lohner
- Written by: Henning Lohner
- Produced by: Peter Lohner; Henning Lohner
- Starring: Frank Zappa; Henning Lohner; John Cage; Karlheinz Stockhausen; Iannis Xenakis; Matt Groening; Bob Stone; Pierre Boulez
- Cinematography: Van Carlson
- Edited by: Sven Fleck
- Music by: Frank Zappa
- Release date: 1991
- Running time: 59 min
- Language: English

Peefeeyatko is a 1991 biographical art film written and directed by Henning Lohner about and in collaboration with acclaimed American composer Frank Zappa. Running 59 minutes, the documentary essay has been called "an intimate music portrait," allowing an insight into the composer's secluded world.

Featuring discussions with Zappa himself as well as interviews with friends, colleagues and famous contemporaries of the composer, the production focuses on Zappa executing his compositional work, including footage in Zappa's studio environment, marking the first time Zappa allowed a film crew to study and accompany him during his artistic process. Zappa's entire soundtrack was an original composition, exclusively released through this film.

== Content and form ==
Peefeeyatko is a filmic essay and documentary portrait of the work and music of American composer and musician Frank Zappa, featuring various video clips and interviews. It shows several days in the late years of Zappa's life, as he spends much of his time composing, living secluded from the outside world at his home and music studio in Los Angeles, California.

1 1/2 years prior to the filming of Peefeeyatko, Zappa had, in composing, turned away from Rock and Roll music for which he had become famous. Ever since, he worked on new, contemporary, orchestral electronic music. This creative process is depicted in the film, showing Zappa composing in solitude and beyond any commercial conventions or commitments.

Thereby, Peefeeyatko also includes footage in and around Zappa's studio environment, showing Zappa creating symphonic musical pieces on a digital synthesizer, which was new at the time and is named a "Synclavier." Zappa leads the audience through his large archive for sounds and compositions, letting the viewer participate in the development of his compositional work. The film shows Zappa building up a composition by entering notes on the keyboard and combining the result with earlier recorded tracks.

By contrast, in a staged interview Zappa discusses music and composition. Here, he talks about the variety of his own taste in music — regarding his interest in blues and rhythm since being very young while simultaneously being intrigued by experimental music like the one by French born American composer Edgard Varèse. He also discusses his own music style and his relationship to the outside world — and how both are interconnected. This connection is emphasized by short clips of metaphorical images, impressions and visual stories, which lead to the final music video sequence of Zappa's original composition, with the visual images composed in accordance to Zappa's music.

Furthermore, Zappa explains the sense and purpose of his creations and defies the conventions of the term “melody.” In order to describe the radical nature of his musical eclecticism, Zappa explains in the film: "The easiest way to sum up the aesthetic would be: anything, anytime, anyplace for no reason at all. And I think with an aesthetic like that you can have pretty good latitude for being creative."

The film also features interviews with acclaimed fellow musicians like Iannis Xenakis, John Cage, Karlheinz Stockhausen and Pierre Boulez.

At the end of the film, it is revealed that the title “Peefeeyatko” is a term from the language of Bigfoot — which are ape-like creatures in North American folklore — and means "Give me more apples." This term is considered appropriate by Zappa, as he is doing something that “no person has done before” — which is why there is no word for it.

== Production ==
Peefeeyatko marked the first time Zappa allowed a film crew to study and accompany him while he was composing. Just before the filming, Zappa had been diagnosed with terminal cancer. The main part of the film was shot over a few days at Zappa's house in December 1989.

Peefeeyatko was released on West German television October 10, 1991. In January 1992, Peefeeyatko was presented at the Midem (Marché International du Disque et de l’Edition Musicale) in Cannes, an esteemed trade show which is billed as the leading international business event for the music ecosystem. Furthermore, it was shown at various film festivals around the world, amongst them at the Portland Art Museum in 1996.

== Reception ==
On the occasion of Peefeeyatko's national broadcast on German television, Süddeutsche Zeitung, one of the largest daily newspapers in Germany, called Peefeeyatko an "intimate, but also funny portrait."

In a review of the productions presented at the Midem in Cannes, Swiss newspaper Neue Zürcher Zeitung commented that Lohner had translated Zappa’s personality into the cinematic medium completely adequately by showcasing an ever-changing frequency of multimedia frenzy.

Encyclotronic called Peefeeyatko "an intimate music portrait of American composer Frank Zappa” and wrote that the film “seeks to reveal the sensitivities of Zappa's personality and character also beyond narrative content."

Openculture wrote, "Like its subject, Lohner's film is eccentric, with scenes from monster movies spliced in with footage of Zappa working and talking."
