= Hannah Rickards =

British artist

Hannah Rickards (born 1979) is a British conceptual sound artist. She has won the Max Mara Art Prize for Women, the Philip Leverhulme Prize in Visual and Performing Arts and the Nigel Greenwood Art Prize.

== Life and work ==
Rickards was born in 1979 in Hammersmith, London. She studied at Central Saint Martins, graduating in 2002. In 2007, she returned to teach there as a lecturer in Fine Art.

Rickards is a conceptual sound artist. In 2007, Rickards interviewed people from Alaska who said they could hear the aurora borealis. During a solo show at The Showroom gallery in Marylebone, London, she displayed transcripts from her interviews on three monitors in red, green and blue.

Rickards' 2009 two-screen film work No, there was no red, was displayed at the Whitechapel Gallery before it toured to the Collezione Maramotti in Reggio Emilia, Italy.

Rickards' 2014 exhibition at Modern Art Oxford was accompanied by a monograph examining her artistic practice and with an introduction by Paul Hobson.

After winning the Philip Leverhulme Prize in 2015, Rickards took a two-year sabbatical from teaching at Central Saint Martins, during which time she worked on a new piece at the Experimental Media and Performing Arts Center, in Troy, New York, and undertook research trips to the Banff Centre for Arts and Creativity in Banff, Alberta.

== Publications ==
- To enable me to fix my attention on any one of these symbols I was to imagine that I was looking at the colours as I might see them on a moving picture screen. Oxford: Modern Art Oxford, 2014. By Paul Hobson, Sally Shaw, Isla Leaver-Yap, Rickards, and Adam Chodzko.
- Grey light. Left and right back, high up, two small windows. Sternberg/Fogo Island Arts, 2016. By Melissa Gronlund, Will Holder, Alexandra McIntosh, Nicolaus Schafhausen, and Rickards.

== Awards ==
- 2009: Max Mara Art Prize for Women
- 2015: Philip Leverhulme Prize in Visual and Performing Arts
- 2018: Nigel Greenwood Art Prize

== Exhibitions ==
- MaxMara Art Prize for Women: Hannah Rickards: No, there was no red, Whitechapel Gallery, London, 2009
- To enable me to fix my attention on any one of these symbols I was to imagine that I was looking at the colours as I might see them on a moving picture screen., Modern Art Oxford, Oxford, England, 2014
- Modern Art Oxford, Oxford, England, 2016
- One can make out the surface only by placing any dark-coloured object on the ground, The Polygon Gallery, North Vancouver, Canada, 2018-2019
