= Helen Cammock =

English artist (born 1970)

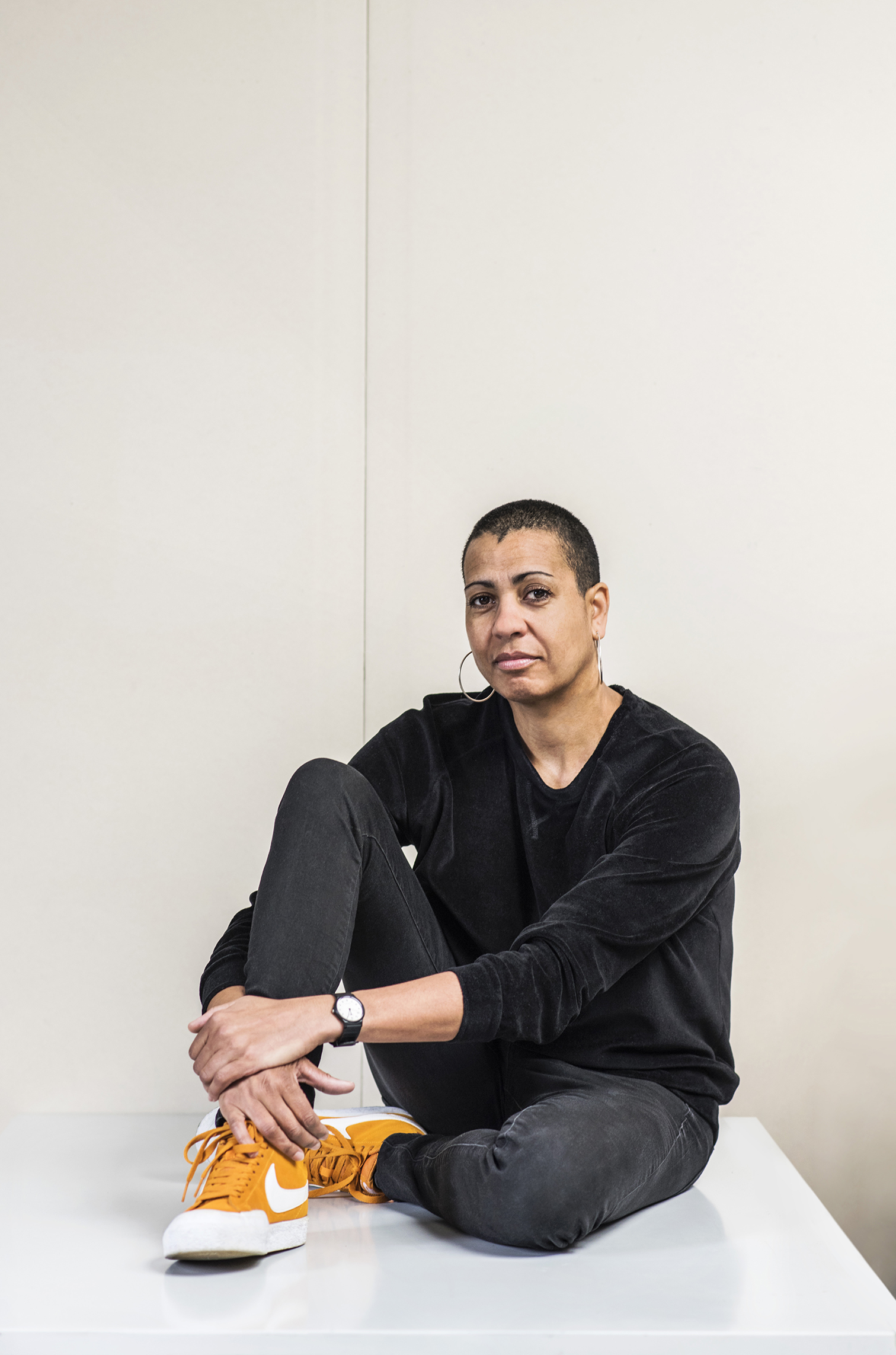
- Born: 1970 (age 55–56); Staffordshire, England
- Education: Royal College of Arts (MA, 2011), University of Brighton (BA Hons, 2008)
- Occupation: Artist
- Known for: Film, Image, Photography, Writing, Poetry, Spoken Word, Song, Performance, Printmaking and Installation
- Awards: Max Mara Art Prize for Women, 2018; Turner Prize, 2019

Helen Cammock (/ˈkæmɒk/ KAM-ok; born 1970) is a British artist. She was shortlisted for the 2019 Turner Prize and was awarded the prize along with the other three nominees (Tai Shani, Oscar Murillo and Lawrence Abu Hamdan). For the first time ever, they asked the jury to award the prize to all four artists and their request was granted. She works in a variety of media including moving image, photography, poetry, spoken word, song, printmaking and installation.

== Life and work ==
Cammock was born in 1970 in Staffordshire, England. She grew up in London and Somerset. Her Jamaican father was a ceramicist and art teacher. Cammock's film Character Building deals with the acts of racism that she, her sister, and mother faced for being a mixed-race family.

Cammock worked for 10 years as a social worker. At the age of 35, she began her studies in Photography at the Royal College of Arts, followed by study at the University of Brighton.

Following the award of the Max Mara Art Prize in 2018, Cammock travelled across Italy to Florence, Rome, Palermo, Bologna, Venice and Reggio Emilia. She filmed a performance on Beatrice Cenci's spinet in Bologna. During this time in Italy, Cammock made her work Che si può fare, which is an exploration into women's lament, an important theme in much of her work.

"I am drawn to the poetry and music of lament; but also a personal, generational and historical lineage of sadness, longing and loss as a black woman. I know this lament does not belong only to my experience – it is something that is often ignored or undermined as part of world histories; and of course it is present most visibly in conflict, displacement and refugee stories."

— Helen Cammock, interview by Chris Fite-Wassilak in Frieze magazine, April 2018

Cammock's work often seeks to connect women's stories and voices across time, with common themes of oppression, feminist resistance, and solidarity, and exploring intersections of gender and race, the collective and the individual.

Her 2025 video work Persistence was displayed at the National Portrait Gallery from late 2025 until June 2026. It was removed from display due to controversy regarding the role of Winston Churchill in the Bengal famine of 1943.

== Exhibitions ==
- 2020: They Call It Idlewild at Wysing Arts Centre

The exhibition consisted of video and installed billboards across the Wysing Arts Centre site, with dialogue and text including questions "Can you remember when you last did nothing? When you last did nothing, can you remember how it felt?". Although made before the 2020 pandemic took hold, Erica Scourti noted in her review that "Cammock's static camera, placed originally to linger on interior details of Wysing's studio spaces, accommodation and grounds, all places of artistic activity now dormant, seems to anticipate our arrested motion".

- 2019: Che si può fare, which premiered at the Whitechapel Gallery, London, in summer 2019 and was shown at the Collezione Maramotti, Reggio Emilia, Italy in 2019–2020.

At the Whitechapel, "The main work is a three-channel film featuring interviews with activists, musicians, historians and artists from Cammock's time in Italy." The lives and work of women Baroque composers, Barbara Strozzi, Francesca Caccini, Lucrezia Vizzana are also explored. A reviewer for the London Evening Standard noted that "its abiding message is of inspiring resistance to oppressive forces".

- 2019: The Long Note – Irish Museum of Modern Art, Dublin, Ireland
- 2018: The Long Note – Void, Derry, Northern Ireland"The Long Note- Helen Cammock". Archived from the original on 31 July 2019.

The Long Note was nominated for the Turner Prize, and shown at Turner Contemporary in Margate, Kent, UK. The film and installation examines the civil rights movement in Derry, with a particular focus on the role of women, and makes connections between Irish civil rights and Black civil rights. In several sequences, Cammock combines found footage of Nina Simone with footage from the Troubles.

- 2017: Shouting in Whispers – Cubitt Gallery, London

== Awards ==
- 2018 – Max Mara Art Prize for Women
- 2019 – Turner Prize

== See also ==
- List of English women artists
