= The Revenge of the Dead Indians =

- Directed by: Henning Lohner
- Written by: Henning Lohner
- Produced by: Christoph Jörg; Peter Lohner; Henning Lohner
- Starring: John Cage; Merce Cunningham; Noam Chomsky; Dennis Hopper; Frank Zappa; Rutger Hauer; Yoko Ono; Yehudi Menuhin; Benoît Mandelbrot; Murray Gell-Mann; Iannis Xenakis; Matt Groening; John Zorn
- Cinematography: Van Carlson
- Edited by: Sven Fleck
- Music by: John Cage
- Release date: 1993
- Running time: 130 min or 150 min.
- Languages: German, English, French

The Revenge of the Dead Indians (original German title: Die Rache der toten Indianer) is a 1993 documentary film essay directed by Henning Lohner about composer John Cage and his theories about music. It pays tribute to Cage's thoughts, music, and influence and has been described as "an unexpected and fascinating combination of intellectual thought, viewpoints and opinions."

Featuring discussions with Cage himself as well as interviews with friends, companions and colleagues of the famous composer, the film thematically combines "found" video and audio landscapes inspired by Cage's texts, music and philosophy. It is structured according to Cage's compositional methods and translates these musical processes freely to the film medium.

The film was released after Cage had recently died. It has been released on video and DVD since 10 June 2008.

== Content and form ==
Both in content as well as in its cinematic approach and structure, The Revenge Of The Dead Indians is a homage to John Cage, paying tribute to one of the most influential American composers of the 20th century. The film can neither clearly be categorized as a documentary nor as a feature film. Rather, it is a combination of "found" videos and diverse soundscapes. It has also been called a "film essay."

The mode of filmic depiction is based on, and inspired by, the philosophy and the compositional creative work of Cage himself. Lohner portrays Cage in regards to the musical principle that every image, every statement and every scene can entirely stand on its own, complete in itself as its own narrative entity, yet also remain central to the overall structure and phrasing of the film. It was Lohner's goal to honor Cage's creative mind, Cage's works and his influence. Thereby, the filmmaker's attention is focused on “forgotten” landscapes: places which one easily passes and which are located at the roadside and are not popularly touristic, otherwise unnoticed or ignored in daily life.

Narratively, The Revenge Of The Dead Indians deals with the major issues that Cage was occupied with: Coincidence and chaos, his buddhist worldview — rejecting to manipulate the world —, art as imitation of nature, and the identity of music and sounds. Therefore, short clips of Cage's concerts and his musical performances are shown. Furthermore, short images, sometimes only for a few seconds, of nature, landscapes and cities are featured; these images were recorded world-wide and are partially accompanied by music and sounds. Together, they add up to a "large, through-composed picture collage" inspired by Cage's texts.

Additionally, conversations with Cage himself are shown repeatedly during the film. The film also features interviews with 42 individuals — from well-known artists, actors, architects, choreographers, composers, theoreticians and writers to unknown street cleaners and market vendors who love street noise and sounds — in conversation with each other. Amongst the interview partners are famous personalities such as Heiner Müller, John Zorn, Giorgio Strehler, Iannis Xenakis, Frank Zappa, Yoko Ono, William Forsythe, Alison Knowles, Yehudi Menuhin, Richard Serra, Merce Cunningham, Ellsworth Kelly, Dennis Hopper and Noam Chomsky, talking about their encounters with Cage, the impression his music left on them, and his significance for their own work.

They also comment on phenomena that Cage dealt with, such as coincidence, chaos, anarchy, noise and silence.

The film ends with a performance of Cage's piece 4′33″, performed in 1990 at the Invalidenstraße in Berlin, coincidentally the day that the old checkpoint between East and West Berlin was torn down.

== Title ==
The film's title derives from dramatist Heiner Müller who is interviewed in the film, remarking that John Cage was “the revenge of the dead Indians on European music.” Thereby, he refers to the murdered Native Americans who are a central part of American history but have been pushed aside and ignored ever since: Müller explains that "culture comes from the oppressed, the displaced and has therefore become the unconscious; which rebels, and is the Indian element of Cage."

== Background and production ==
In the early 1990s, Lohner worked with Cage on Cage's only film production, titled One 11. Both had met in August 1990 when Cage had come to Germany to give a series of concerts. Lohner was working for German Public Television and was asked to document Cage's visit to Berlin. Subsequently, they collaborated during the final years of Cage's life. During that time, Lohner filmed interviews and footage with Cage, and after Cage's death decided to assemble some of it into The Revenge of the Dead Indians.

Concert performances incorporated in the film were recorded live during the "Musicircus" homage at Symphony Space in New York, November 1, 1992, and at the John Cage music festival at the Akademie der Schönen Künste in East Berlin, August 1, 1990. Furthermore, Lohner and cinematographer Van Carlson filmed in the deserts of New Mexico, in Napa Valley in California, in the European landscapes of France, Italy and Germany, as well as in big cities like Los Angeles, New York, San Francisco, Milan, Paris, Osaka, Tokyo and Hong Kong.

The Revenge of the Dead Indians was financed through 45 TV-documentaries which Lohner during that time realized for the ZDF and Arte, as the filmmaker himself recalls:

"Every tape of raw material went into the fundus for the Dead Indians. We were engaged in recycling and making subversive use of the existing production and broadcast structures (for whom we had, after all, supplied over 45 films by now) – and we kept all the raw material, the left-overs, precisely the typical television garbage, the tape ashes, from which then this film could emerge."

Lohner explains that the film was also his revenge on the conventional, rating-driven television system, as the "classic television task is typically focused on a previously articulated topic, which has to be realized within certain content-based and technically outlined conditions. In this sense, the task within public and private television is subjected to rigid guidelines, and thus is not open to experiments, coincidences or individual initiative."

The film emerged from over 250 hours of footage and 200 hours of recorded sound, woven together from over 1200 cuts, with the final edit having a script organized like a music score. The sound and visual material was edited to more than 1200 cuts before the final film length of 130 minutes was reached. The shortest scene has the duration of exactly one frame, the longest scene has the duration of exactly 4 minutes, 33 seconds.

Lohner and his editor Sven Fleck put together a score for the edits, "hoping that chance could emerge again from the non-coincidental. The editing of the film had to deconstruct the composed aspects, so that the material could be interpreted by the viewer in infinitely different ways." The selection of the images and texts of the film was based on a pattern of musical composition. Lohner and Fleck put together catalogues of images which lexically referred to similarities in the image content, while all the recorded interviews, readings and conversations were copied word by word onto several thousand pages and then divided into thematic chapters. Through several selective processes, they were “sieved” and assembled into a three-act-structure.

== Reception ==
The Revenge of the Dead Indians has been called "an unexpected and fascinating combination of intellectual thought, viewpoints and opinions." The blog For All Events commented that the film was "an excellent documentary introduction to the music and ideas of John Cage. […] The film delivers a sympathetic and enjoyable presentation of his music and his ideas. He was a charming, interesting, thoughtful man."

In the German newspaper Tageszeitung, critic Birgit Glombitza raved that Lohner's 130-minute-homage to Cage was a "symphony of coincidences" that illuminates the compositional methods of the man whom modern music owed its symbiosis of harmony and chaos to.

Music magazine klassic.com called The Revenge Of The Dead Indians a "fascinating, artistically ambitious, in the end slightly exhausting, but always inspiring portrait of John Cage and his outstanding importance for music and art of the 20th century."

== Featured personalities ==
- Yves Bazillou
- Michael Berger
- John Cage
- Farid Chahboub
- Noam Chomsky
- Merce Cunningham
- Jacqeline Daubert
- René Delesalle
- Ellsworth Kelly
- William Forsythe
- Corinne Fortin
- Betty Freeman
- Frank Gehry
- Murray Gell-Mann
- Matt Groening
- Ben Habdallah
- Rutger Hauer
- Dennis Hopper
- Alison Knowles
- Raymond Kurzweil
- Edward Lorenz
- Benoît Mandelbrot
- Yehudi Menuhin
- Mohamed Ben Methnic
- Marvin Minsky
- Heiner Müller
- M. Neraqueller
- Jean Nouvel
- Yoko Ono
- Baramouh Parianen
- Soopaya Parianen
- Tomaso Poggio
- René Sancier
- Richard Serra
- Giorgio Strehler
- Claude Trouve
- Iannis Xenakis
- Frank Zappa
- John Zorn

== Sources ==
=== External links ===
- The Revenge of the Dead Indians at IMDb
- "John Cage Centennial Tribute". Archived from the original on 2019-03-08.
- THE REVENGE OF THE DEAD INDIANS
- Revenge of the Dead Indians (In Memoriam John Cage)
- Electronic Arts Intermix: Die Rache der Toten Indianer, John Cage
