= One11 =

One^{11} is a 1992 monochrome art film by John Cage and Henning Lohner. It is the only feature-length film production Cage was ever involved in. The film has no plot and consists of black-and-white images depicting a composed and chance-determined play of electric light. It can be accompanied by the orchestra piece 103. Described as "film without subject" and "abstract study in light and shade", it was completed in 1992 only weeks before Cage's death.

One^{11} has garnered acclaim from film and music critics alike. Hailed for its dream-like, meditative quality as well as its striking visuals and sounds, the film originally aired on German television and has been presented at various theatrical venues and exhibitions since its premiere in September 1992.

== Content ==
One^{11} is a film without a subject consisting of ever-evolving patterns of light and shade against a fixed backdrop. Filmed in black and white, chance operations were used with respect to the camera shots and editing. It is musically accompanied by the orchestral work 103. The film and the musical piece are of the same duration and run in parallel, without relating directly to each other; both are 90-minutes long, divided into seventeen parts. Each of the parts is based on approximately 1200 random operations devised by a computer and determining the lighting and the movements of a crane-mounted camera. The title refers to a chronological order in Cage's repertoire: it is the 11th composition that Cage wrote for a single performer – in this case, the camera.

Cage stated the film has "no plot, no characters, nothing", hoping it would "give pleasure without having any meaning whatsoever". He wanted it to be "free of politics, economics and even of oneself".

== Production ==
For a long time, John Cage had resisted the idea of creating a film. But the German-born Los Angeles film composer Henning Lohner convinced him to make a feature-length film for cinema and TV. Cage reportedly said, laughing, "if I have the opportunity to do something then I jump at it, instead of hesitating, because there isn't much time left!"

As early as in 1952, John Cage had started to address both the perception of emptiness and the random quality of what happens in a prescribed space in his piece 4:33, which consisted entirely of silence. Forty years later, having spoken about silence musically, Cage now wished to treat it visually – through a film about light itself. Cage said, "I think light gives me the pleasure that sound gives. [...] [I]n this day of violence and overpopulation, war and economic collapse, I think it gives us something to enjoy." He commented on the filming of One^{11} by saying, "Of course the film will be about the effect of light in an empty space. But no space is actually empty, and the light will show what is in it. And all this space and all this light will be controlled by random operations."

This concept was implemented professionally in a Munich television studio in 1992 under the direction of Henning Lohner. It was shot in 35mm black-and-white by cameraman Van Theodore Carlson. Filming began on April 22 at a large TV studio in Munich, with a crew of about a dozen TV engineers and technicians. Working with 35 mm cameras on a tripod, crane or hand-held, Carlson often changed their lens openings, as required by the score. The work was completed only weeks before John Cage's death in 1992. The film premiered in Cologne, Germany, on September 19, 1992, accompanied by the live performance of the orchestra piece 103 by the WDR Symphony Orchestra of the German Radio.

In the DVD released by Mode Records, viewers can choose between two different performances of Cage's orchestral 103 to accompany the film: the version recorded at the premiere by the WDR Symphony Orchestra as well as a version by the Spoleto Festival Orchestra.

== Reception ==
One^{11} received critical acclaim. Shortly after its premiere, famous French filmmaker Louis Malle called the film "very strong, very daring, and finally completely mesmerizing." Writing for BBC Music Magazine, Barry Witherden said, "What makes it art is the mediation of artists", while The Solute hailed the work's "antiquated magic", stating that the film has "the feel of a dream or meditation from an age that's already gone."

Peter Dickinson called One^{11} in the Gramophone magazine "a splendid project carried out with dedication by all concerned" and praised the "remarkable quality of these uniquely pure visual images, studies in light ranging from total black to total white. ... The play of lights brings up slowly moving circular objects eerily reminiscent of distant moons transmitted from outer space posing the eternal questions of existence." Dickinson concluded that "Cage's formulae for removing personal taste have paradoxically produced mesmeric images that only he could have devised."

In his review for The Wire magazine, Philip Clark wrote: "The black and white grainy quality of the picture allows for a rich palette of tones and textures, and the images are so disarmingly striking that your eyes can't help but listen carefully. ... The sounds are otherworldly and hovering. ... Cage himself looks frail and died shortly after One^{11} appeared. But what an extraordinary valedictory throw of the dice."

The blog The Sound of Eye called the film "a masterpiece", writing, "while One^{11} is certainly one of the most accomplished and beautiful exercises in [Cage's] repertoire, it can also be said be seen as the most lucid and transparent demonstration of its conceptual and philosophical principles. A rare sense of timelessness emerges from these plays of light, and the film's pristine beauty can surely entrance anyone not interested or learned in Cage theory."

Reviewing the film in 2014 with regards to the John Cage exhibit "Neither" in London, writer and broadcaster Morgan Quaintance said that the work was "exceptional", writing for Art Agenda: "At the exhibition's core is, thrillingly, an underexposed work by Cage that was also his last. What's more remarkable is that One^{11} and 103 (1992), a combined 90-minute film and sound work, exposes a different, more somber and mysterious dimension of the influential composer's output. Made in collaboration with German filmmaker Henning Lohner, the film is an abstract study in light and shade."
