= Margaret Salmon =

American film director

- Born: 1975 (age 50–51); Suffern, New York
- Occupations: Film-maker, artist

Margaret Salmon is an American and British based film maker-artist.

The work of this New York-born filmmaker is fuelled by references to the great realist tradition in film, be it the propaganda documentary of the Farm Security Administration in the United States, Italian neorealism, or French cinéma vérité. Her subjects are taken from everyday life: people with modest incomes, showing their at once ordinary and dramatic lives. Salmon is particularly sensitive to interactions between the soundtrack and the image, which she uses to produce disturbing effects that heighten the documentary sobriety of her films with a lyrical dimension. She shoots all of her works, working as both Director and Cinematographer, on 16mm & 35mm film.

She won the first MaxMara Art Prize for Women in association with the Whitechapel in London in 2006. She has had a solo show at the Witte de With, Rotterdam and the Whitechapel Art Gallery in London in 2007 and Salmon was shown at The Venice Biennale in 2007.

== Biography ==
Salmon was born in Suffern, New York on June 1, 1975, and now lives and works in Glasgow, Scotland. She graduated from the School of Visual Arts (SVA) in New York with a B.A. in 1998 and received an M.A. from the Royal College of Art (RCA) in London in 2003.

She won second prize at the Beck's futures student show at the ICA while at the Royal College of Art. She appeared in the New Contemporaries shows at the Liverpool Biennial and the Barbican Centre in London in 2004 and was the first recipient of the MaxMara Art Prize for Women in association with the Whitechapel Gallery in 2006, which included a six-month residency in Italy. In 2006 she won the Paris-based Art Prize 'Prix Gilles Dusein' in association with La Maison européenne de la photographie. Her solo show at the Whitechapel was in Time Out London's Top 5 Critics Pick. Salmon was a visiting artist/resident at The American Academy in Rome and Cittadellarte-Fondazione Pistoletto in Biella, in Italy during 2006 as part of winning the MaxMara Art Prize. She has received grants from the Arts Council of England and Elephant Trust among others.

== Exhibitions ==
=== Solo exhibitions ===
- 2011: Margaret Salmon, (curated by Dominic Molon), Contemporary Art Museum St. Louis, St. Louis, 8 March - 27 March - Salmon's 'first solo museum exhibition in an American museum'.

=== Group shows and festivals ===
- 2007: Think with the Senses – Feel with the Mind. Art in the Present Tense, Venice Biennale, Arsenale, Venice, Italy.

== Filmography ==
- P.S. (shot 1998; completed 2002).
- M 2002 (2002)
- Peggy (2003)
- Ramapo Central (2003)
- Ninna Nanna (2007)
- M 2007 (2007)
- Fireman (2008)
- Guns Trilogy (2008)
- Rooms - East New Orleans (2008)
- Hyde Park (2009)
- The Enemies of the Rose (2010)
- Times Square (2010)
- Colour Line (2011) – study of man in truck based on the story John Told Me (2010)
- Gibraltar(2013)
- Housework (2014)
- Oyster (2014)
- Pyramid (single screen) (2014)
- Bird (2016)
- Eglantine (2016)
- Mm (2017)

== Awards ==
- MaxMara Art Prize for Women in association with the Whitechapel, 2006 (winner)

== Publications ==
- Portraits in Time, The films of Margaret Salmon. Whitechapel Publishing, 2007.
- Margaret Salmon. WdW Publishing, 2007.

== Cinematography ==
- Leipzig music video, Matthew Herbert (2010)
- Dublin music video, Matthew Herbert (2010)
- Medea, Ursula Mayer (2013)
- Through the Nose music video, Megan Wyler (2013)
- To the Editor of Amateur Photographer, Luke Fowler and Mark Fell (2014)
- Silent Sticks, Corin Sworn (2015)
- The Shakes music video, Matthew Herbert (2015)
- Atom Spirit, Ursula Mayer (2016)
- Allegro Largo Triste, Aurélien Froment (2017)
- A Blemished Code, Anne-Marie Copestake (2017)
- We the People are the Work, Antonia Vega and Eduardo Thomas (2017)
