= 2025 in art =

The year 2025 in art involves various significant events.

== Art fairs ==
Listed are art fairs with an article on the English Wikipedia.

=== January ===
- 22 – 26: London Art Fair

=== February ===
- 5 – 9: Zona Maco, Mexico City.
- 6 – 9: India Art Fair, New Delhi

=== March ===
- 5 – 9: Art Madrid
- 15 – 20: TEFAF, Maastricht

=== April ===
- 18 – 20: Art Dubai
- 24 – 27: Expo Chicago

=== May ===
- 1 – 4, 8 – 11: Clio, New York
- 8 – 11: 1-54, New York
- 8 – 11: Independent, New York
- 17 – 18: Springfield Old Capitol, Illinois

=== June ===
- 7 – 8: 57th Street, Chicago
- 19 – 22: Art Basel

=== July ===
- 11 – 13: Cairns Indigenous Art
- 17 – 19: Ann Arbor Street Art Fair

=== August ===
- 9 – 11: Darwin Festival
- 28 – 31: Enter Art, Copenhagen

=== September ===
- 5 – 7: The Armory Show, New York
- 25 – 28: British Art Fair, London

=== October ===
- 3 – 5: Art Jakarta
- 16 – 19: Highlights – Internationale Kunstmesse München, Munich
- 23 – 26: Art Toronto

=== December ===
- 5 - 7: Art Basel Miami Beach, Miami Beach

== Events ==
=== March ===
- March – Rembrandt's only known seascape, The Storm on the Sea of Galilee, stolen in 1990 in a famed art heist from the Isabella Stewart Gardner Museum in Boston is seemingly recovered by FBI from an art gallery in Manhattan. After video of the event goes viral on social media it is revealed that it was staged for a film shoot.

=== April ===
- April – A 12-foot tall bust of Elon Musk which was inspired by a Reddit meme is defaced in Texas.
- April 3 – The Tate Modern in London announces that Jorge and Darlene Pérez the art collectors and Perez Art Museum namesakes donated the monumental Joan Mitchell triptych Iva (1973) to the institution.
- April 23 – The shortlist for the 2025 Turner Prize is announced: Nnena Kalu, Rene Matić, Mohammed Sami and Zadie Xa, with the exhibition held at Cartwright Hall in Bradford as part of its UK City of Culture year.

=== May ===
- May 27 - The organizers of the 2026 Venice Biennale announce that they will go forward with the late Cameroonian-Swiss artistic director of the event Koyo Kouoh's creative vision for the exhibition after she unexpectedly died more than a year before its opening.

=== July ===
- July 15 - The Japan Art Association announces the laureates of the 36th Praemium Imperiale.

=== September ===
- September 25 – More than 600 artifacts related to the British Empire and Commonwealth are stolen from Bristol Museum.

=== October ===
- October 19 – 2025 Louvre robbery: thieves disguised as workers steal eight pieces of the French Crown Jewels from the Galerie d'Apollon of the Louvre art museum in Paris in a daring daylight raid; the Crown of Empress Eugénie is abandoned nearby.
- October 24 – Xie Lei wins the Prix Marcel Duchamp work by the four finalists goes on view at the Musée d'Art Moderne de Paris.

=== November ===
- November 18 – Portrait of Elisabeth Lederer (1914–1916), a life-size oil on canvas portrait by Gustav Klimt, sells for $238.4 million $US rendering it the most expensive work of Modern Art ever sold at auction and the second most expensive work of art ever sold at auction, after Leonardo da Vinci's Salvador Mundi which sold for $450.3 million $US in 2017.
- November 20 – The Dream (The Bed) (1940) by Frida Kahlo sells for 54.7 million $US at Sotheby's in New York, setting both a new record for the highest price of an artwork by a female artist at auction (besting the previous 44.4 million $US highmark paid for Georgia O'Keeffe's Jimson Weed/White Flower No. 1 in 2014 also at Sotheby;s in New York) and that of a Latin American artwork at auction.
- November 27 – Turner and Constable: Rivals and Originals opens at the Tate Britain in London

=== December ===
- December 3 – The Winter Egg, one of the few Fabergé eggs still in private hands, is sold at Christie's in London, England, UK, for £22.9 million (US$30.2 million), setting a new auction record for a work from the House of Fabergé.
- December 7 – Eight engravings by Henri Matisse and five works of Candido Portinari are stolen from Mário de Andrade Library in Brazil.

== Exhibitions ==
- January 10 until March 16 - Nick Cave: Amalgams and Graphts at the Jack Shainman Gallery in New York City.
- January 18 until June 1 - Gertrude Abercrombie: The Whole World is a Mystery at the Carnegie Museum of Art in Pittsburgh, Pennsylvania.
- January 23 until March 11 - Christopher Hart Chambers: Passages at Crossing Art in New York City.
- January 26 until November 15 - Pirouette: Turning Points in Design, Museum of Modern Art, New York
- February 4 until March 22 - Ronnie Landfield Recent Works Findlay Gallery, Palm Beach, Florida,
- February 8 until May 11 - Caspar David Friedrich: The Soul of Nature at the Metropolitan Museum of Art in New York City.
- February 14 until June 15 - Anselm Kiefer: The Early Works at the Ashmolean Museum at Oxford University in Oxford, England.
- February 18 until March 8 - Sylvie Covey: Botanical Space at the NoHo M55 Gallery in New York City.
- March 6 until April 19 - Walton Ford: Tutto at Gagosian in New York City.
- March 6 until April 19 - Julio Galán (a two part exhibition) at Luhring Augustine Gallery and Kurimanzutto in New York City.
- March 23 until August 2 - Jack Whitten: The Messenger at MoMA in New York City.
- March 31 until June 22 - Anselm Kiefer: Solaris at Nijo Castle in Kyoto, Japan.
- April 9 until August 10 - Amy Sherald: American Sublime at the Whitney Museum of American Art in New York City.
- April 9 until August 31 - David Hockney; 25 at the Louis Vuitton Foundation in Paris, France.
- April 18 until July 3 - Picasso: Tête-à-tête (in collaboration with Paloma Picasso) at the Gagosian Gallery on Madison Avenue in New York City.
- April 27 until August 3 - Sargent and Paris at the Metropolitan Museum of Art in New York City.
- April 18 until May 29 - Don Perlis' New York at Ilon Gallery in New York City.
- May 4 until June 26 - David Mellen: Wound of Absence at the Ivy Brown Gallery in New York City.
- May 7 until June 28 - Will Cotton: Between Instinct and Reason at Templon in New York City.
- May 30 until September 14 - In the Medium of Life: The Drawings of Beauford Delaney at The Drawing Center in New York City.
- July 16 until August 30 - Summer Show at Shin Gallery in New York City.
- July 17 until May 31, 2026 - The Magical City: George Morrison's New York at the Metropolitan Museum of Art in New York City.
- September 4 until February 1, 2026 - Man Ray: When Objects Dream at the Metropolitan Museum of Art in New York City.
- September 24 until January 18, 2026 - Sixties Surreal at the Whitney Museum of American Art in New York City.
- October 11 until February 1, 2026 - Monet and Venice at the Brooklyn Museum.
- October 17 until March 2, 2026 - Gerhard Richter at the Louis Vuitton Foundation in Paris.
- October 23 until May 9, 2026 - Monuments at MOCA, LA in Los Angeles,California, (co-organized by The Brick, which is also located in Los Angeles}.
- October 29 until November 21 - David Szauder: Glitches & Glory at the Elza kayal Gallery in New York City.
- November 10 until April 11, 2026 - Wifredo Lam: When I Don't Sleep, I Dream at the MoMA in New York City.
- November 13 until February 28, 2026 - Jeff Koons: Porcelain Series at the Gagosian Gallery in New York City.
- November 15 until January 17, 2026 - Joseph Yaeger: Polygrapher at Modern Art in London, England.
- December 16 until march 14, 2026 - The House on Utopia Parkway: Joseph Cornell’s Studio Re-Created by Wes Anderson at the Gagosian Gallery, Paris.

== Awards ==
- Bennett Prize - Amy Werntz
- Turner Prize - Nnena Kalu
- Prix Marcel Duchamp - Xie Lei
- Praemium Imperiale (painting) - Peter Doig
- Praemium Imperiale (sculpture) - Marina Abramović
- Praemium Imperiale (architecture) - Eduardo Souto de Moura
- Praemium Imperiale (music) - András Schiff
- Praemium Imperiale (theatre/film) - Anne Teresa De Keersmaeker
- Praemium Imperiale Grant for Young Artists - National Youth Theatre
- Hasselblad Award - Sophie Ristelhueber

== Works ==
- Beeple - Regular Animals (sculptural animatronic instillation premiered at Art Basel Miami Beach).
- Jack Butcher - Self Checkout (created for and shown at Art Basel Miami Beach in conjunction with his Visualize Value project concern).
- Nick Cave - Let me kindly introduce myself. They call me MC Prince Brighton created for the Princeton University Art Museum in Princeton, New Jersey (mosaic).
- Adam Cvijanovic - What's So Funny About Peace, Love, and Understanding - at the narthex in St. Patrick's Cathedral in New York City (completed).
- Jens Galschiot - The Orange Plague
- Victor "Marka27" Quiñonez - Brownsville King of Love (mural) in Brownsville, Brooklyn, New York.
- Lachlan Turczan and ivy Ross and the Google design team - Making the Invisible Visible for Milan Design Week in Milan, Italy.
- Joseph Yaeger - We Come in With Some of Who We Are
- Make America Wait Again

== Deaths ==
=== January ===
- January 3 – La Chunga, 87, Spanish flamenco dancer, painter. and painter's muse (Salvador Dalí) (born 1938)
- January 4
  - Ed Askew, 84, American painter (born 1940)
  - Peter Brandes, 80, Danish painter and sculptor (born 1944)
  - Elisabeth Haarr, 78, Norwegian textile artist (born 1945)
- January 4 – Jagdish Mittal, 99, Indian art collector (born 1925)
- January 5 – Philippa Blair, 79, New Zealand artist (born 1945).
- January 7 – Leo Segedin, 97, American painter (born 1927)
- January 8 – Alastair MacKinven, 53, British artist (born 1971) (death announced on this date)
- January 13 – Oliviero Toscani, 82, Italian photographer (Benetton) (born 1942)
- January 16
  - David Lynch, 78, American film director and visual artist (born 1946)
  - George A. Tice, 86, American photographer (born 1938)
- January 17 – Jules Feiffer, 95, American cartoonist, author, and visual artist (born 1929)
- January 21
  - Jo Baer, 95, American painter (born 1929)
  - Håkon Bleken, 96, Norwegian painter (born 1929)
  - Renina Katz, 99, Brazilian engraver (born 1925)
- January 22 – Aaron De Groft, 59, American art museum director (Orlando Museum of Art) (born 1965) (death announced on this date)
- January 24
  - Rutherford Chang, 45, American conceptual artist (born 1979)
  - Jaune Quick-to-See Smith, 85, American artist and curator (born 1940)
- January 27 – Alonzo Davis, 82, American artist and academic (born 1942)
- January 28 – Graham Nickson, 78, British painter, longtime dean of the New York Studio School; (born 1946)

=== February ===
- February 1 – C. Richard Kramlich, 89, American venture capitalist and video art collector (born 1935)
- February 2 – Helga de Alvear, 88, German-Spanish art collector and dealer (born 1936)
- February 3
  - David Edward Byrd, 83, American graphic artist (born 1941)
  - Lim Tze Peng, 103, Singaporean painter (born 1921)
- February 5
  - Satoru Abe, 98, American sculptor and painter (born 1926)
  - Waldo Díaz-Balart, 93, Cuban painter and sculptor (born 1931)
- February 8 – Yrjö Kukkapuro, 91, Finnish interior architect and furniture designer (born 1933)
- February 9 - Walter Robinson, 74, American painter and art writer (born 1950).
- February 10 - Mustafa Arruf, 66, Spanish sculptor (born 1958)
- February 11 - Kay Smith, 101, American visual artist (born 1923)
- February 12 - Mel Bochner, 84, American conceptual artist (born 1940)
- February 20 - Frankétienne, 88, Haitian painter (born 1936)
- February 23 - Ming Fay, 82, Chinese-born American sculptor (born 1943)

=== March ===
- March 1 - Jack Vettriano, 73, Scottish painter (The Singing Butler) (born 1951)
- March 3 - Victor Cicansky, 90, Canadian sculptor (born 1935)
- March 14 - Fred Eversley, 83, American sculptor (born 1941)
- March 17 - Peter Sedgley, 95, English artist, co-founder of Space Studios (born 1930)
- March 22
  - Joe Goode, 87, American painter.
  - Asaf Lifshitz, 82, Israeli sculptor (born 1942)
- March 25 - Abdul Karim Al-Orrayed, 90–91, Bahraini artist (born 1934)
- March 27 - Marcia Marcus, 97, American painter (born 1928)

=== April ===
- April 6 - Max Kozloff, 91, American art historian and art critic (born 1933)
- April 11 - Gretchen Dow Simpson, 85, American painter (born 1939)
- April 14 - Elaine Wynn 82, American art collector and philanthropist (born 1942)
- April 19 - Guy Ullens, 90, Belgian art collector (born 1935)
- April 22 - Zurab Tsereteli, 91, Russian-Georgian sculptor (Birth of the New World, To the Struggle Against World Terrorism), painter, and architect, president of the Russian Academy of Arts (born 1934)
- April 23 - Tony Bechara, 83, Puerto Rican-American painter (born 1942)
- April 27 - Suki Seokyeong Kang, 48, South Korean visual artist (born 1977)

=== May ===
- May 2 - Dara Birnbaum, 78, American video and installation artist (born 1946)
- May 9 - André Rouillé, 76–77, French historian and theorist of photography (born 1948) (death announced on this date)
- May 10 - Koyo Kouoh, 57, Cameroonian-born Swiss museum curator (Zeitz MOCAA) (born 1967)
- May 12 - Yasunao Tone, 90, Japanese sound artist (born 1935)
- May 21 - Eva, German performance artist (Eva & Adele)
- May 23 - Sebastião Salgado, 81, Brazilian photographer (born 1944)

=== June ===
- June 4 - Daniel Lelong, 92, French gallerist and publisher (born 1933!)
- June 6 - Graham Gund, 84, American architect (Lowry Center) and art collector (born 1940)
- June 10 - Günther Uecker, 95, German painter, sculptor, and installation artist (born 1930)
- June 14
  - Leonard Lauder, 92, American art collector and philanthropist (born 1933)
  - Henk van Os, 87, Dutch art historian(born 1938)
  - Joel Shapiro, 83, American sculptor (born 1941)
- June 15 - Thornton Willis, 89, American painter (born 1936),
- June 18 - Marcia Resnick, 74, American photographer (born 1950)
- June 22 - Arnaldo Pomodoro, 98, Italian sculptor (Sphere Within Sphere) (born 1926)
- June 25 - Pat Williams, 87, American elected official and arts advocate (NEA) (born 1937)
- June 26 - Peter Hutchinson, 95, British born American conceptual, land artist (born 1930),

=== July ===
- July 1 - Sir Brian Clarke, 71, British painter, architectural artist and printmaker (born 1953)
- July 10 - Radomir Damnjanović Damnjan, 89, Serbian-Italian painter (born 1935)
- July 19 - Raymond Saunders, 90, American artist (born 1934)
- July 20 - Hamiduzzaman Khan, 79, Bangladeshi sculptor (born 1945)
- July 29 - Lena Cronqvist, 86, Swedish painter and sculptor (born 1938)
- July 31 - Robert Wilson, 83, American experimental theater stage director and playwright (born 1941)

=== August ===
- August 9 - Amnon Barzel, 90, Israeli art critic (born 1935)
- August 17
  - Humberto Calzada, 81, Cuban-American artist (born 1944)
  - Joe Caroff, 103, American graphic designer (born 1921)
- August 18 - Eduard Carbonell i Esteller, 79, Spanish art historian, director of the Museu Nacional d'Art de Catalunya (1994–2005)(born 1946)

=== September ===
- September 3 - Rosalyn Drexler, 98, American artist and writer (born 1926)
- September 3 - Robert Grosvenor, 88, American sculptor (born 1937)
- September 15 - Norman Toynton, 86, British painter (born 1939) (died in June death announced on this date)
- September 18 - Agnes Gund, 87, American philanthropist and arts patron, president of the Museum of Modern Art (1991–2002) (born 1938)
- September 25 - Juraj Bartusz, 91, Slovak sculptor (born 1933)
- September 30 - Takako Saito, 96, Japanese artist (born 1929)

=== October ===
- October 3 - Milton Esterow, 97, American art journalist (The New York Times, ARTnews) (born 1928)
- October 5 - Ken Jacobs, 92, American experimental filmmaker (born 1933)
- October 9 - Frank Wimberley, 99, American painter, (born 1926)
- October 13 - Drew Struzan, 78, American artist, illustrator, and film poster designer (born 1947)
- October 20 - Ed Kerns, American artist (born 1945)
- October 22 - Jackie Ferrara, 95, American sculptor and draughtswoman (born 1929)
- October 29 - Alison Knowles, 92, American visual artist (Fluxus) (born 1933)

=== November ===
- November 4 - Giorgio Forattini, 94, Italian political cartoonist (La Repubblica, La Stampa, Il Giornale) (born 1931)
- November 10 - Dorothy Vogel, 90, American art collector (born 1935)
- November 19 - Ronald Davis, 88, American painter (born 1937)
- November 21 - Llyn Foulkes, 91, American visual artist (born 1934)
- November 27 - Robert A.M. Stern, 86, American architect (born 1939)

=== December ===
- December 5 -
  - Frank Gehry, 96, Canadian-American architect (Guggenheim Museum Bilbao, Gehry Residence, Louis Vuitton Foundation) (Pritzker Prize winner 1989) (born 1929)
  - Wolfgang Petrick, 86, German painter (born 1939)
- December 9 - Arthur L. Carter, 93, visual artist and publisher (The New York Observer (born 1931)
- December 11 - Janet Fish, 87, American painter (born 1938)
- December 11 - Ceal Floyer, 57, Pakistani-born British visual artist (born 1968)
- December 18 - Ram V. Sutar, 100, Indian sculptor (Statue of Unity) (born 1925)
- December 19 - Robert Mnuchin, 92, American art dealer (born 1933)
- December 21 - Sigmund Abeles, 91, American painter (born 1934)
- December 22 - Gathie Falk, 97, Canadian painter and sculptor (born 1928)
- December 30 - Margarete Palz, 88, German textile artist (born 1937)
