= Daniel Lismore =

British artist (born 1984)

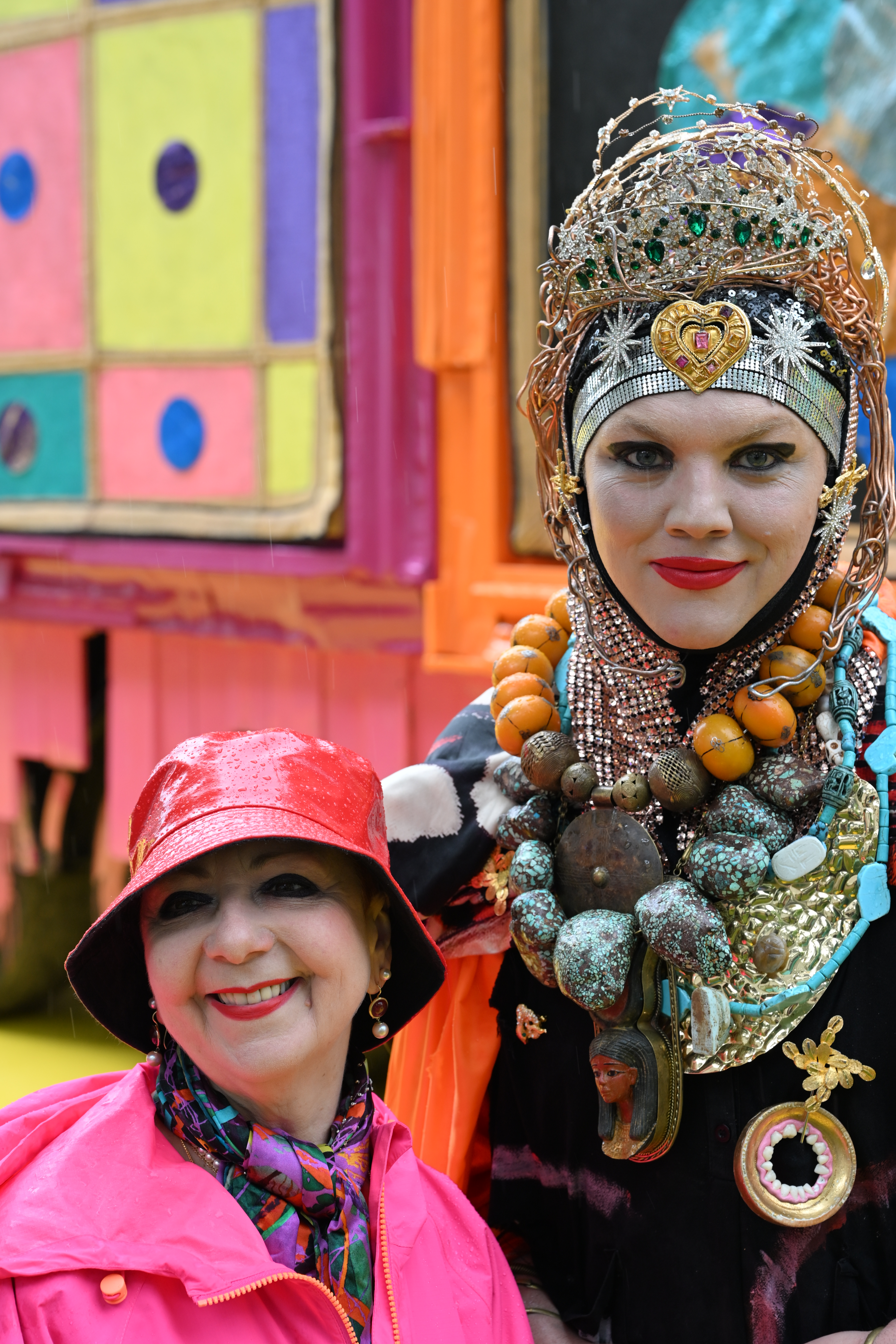
- Daniel Lismore accompanied by Adele at the Biennale di Venezia 2026
- Born: 24 December 1984 (age 41); Bournemouth, England
- Occupation: Artist
- Website: daniellismore.com

Daniel Lismore (born 24 December 1984) is a British fabric sculptor, designer, and campaigner. Described by Vogue Magazine as "England's Most Eccentric Dresser" he is best known for his flamboyant dress sense serving a form of statement, sculpture and even armour.

== Early life ==
Daniel Lismore was born in Bournemouth and raised by his paternal grandparents in the village of Fillongley, on the border of Coventry. He studied photography and fashion design at the Butts College, Coventry. He moved to London aged 17, where he worked as a photographer and model. He has been photographed by some of the world's most famous photographers including Mert and Marcus, Steven Klein, David LaChapelle, Mario Testino and Ellen von Unwerth. A prominent fixture of the London fashion and nightlife circuits, he regularly hosted club events in Mayfair, Soho and East London, where he emerged as one of London's most inventive dressers at early noughties club nights like Boombox. As he said in an interview with Disorder Magazine, "The first club I went to was Ghetto and I discovered Kashpoint and Boombox", he says. "Then I hosted a night at Kabarets Prophecy on Golden Square and clubs in Mayfair… all the clubs I loved have been shut down".

Lismore has been named by Vogue as England's most eccentric dresser.

He took various jobs in fashion, including journalism for i-D Magazine, wardrobe assistant roles at Vogue and Pop magazine. "I had a dream about this beautiful Maasai jacket with a nod to Marie Antoinette. We wanted to juxtapose the richness in the two cultures, so we went to Versailles and I took out my photos from Africa and we came up with this whole collection", he says. "Working on the collection was very unlike dressing myself. I wanted to dress beautiful women, beautifully". Nicki Minaj, Mariah Carey, Rita Ora, Debbie Harry and Cara Delevingne are among the label's famous clientele.

In April 2019 Lismore gave a TED Talk at the main TED2019 conference in Vancouver, titled "Be Yourself" where for the first time he spoke about the art of living sculpture.

During the COVID-19 pandemic, Lismore resided between Coventry and London working on LGBTQ+ activism and new art work including painting and 3D tapestries.

February 2022, His touring museum show ‘Be Yourself, Everyone Else is Already Taken’ debuted in the Uk in his hometown of Coventry City for the UK Capital of Culture at the Herbert Art Gallery And Museum. The show was opened by artists Gilbert & George, attracting over 35,000 attendees including Boy George, Oscar Winning art director Tim Yip and Golda Rosheuvel.

== Living sculpture ==
He has been seen wearing outfits that combine haute couture with vintage fabrics, found objects, chainmail, ethnic jewellery, millinery and more. He has received comparisons to the Australian performance artist Leigh Bowery and Gilbert & George.

== Exhibitions ==
In 2013, Lismore presented his first self-portrait exhibition at the Tate Modern followed by another show at the Tate Britain in 2014.

His first solo exhibition, curated by SCAD director of fashion exhibitions Rafael Gomes - "Be yourself, Everyone else is already taken" opened at Savannah College of Art and Design in Atlanta, Georgia, United States on 22 January 2016. The exhibition featured 45 sculptures, each styled individually and installed in an imperial regiment, inspired by the Terracotta Warriors of China. The travelling exhibition received over 40,000 visitors worldwide and was ranked by WGSN as the second most significant global fashion exhibition of 2016:

The exhibition travelled to many other museums attracting tens of thousands of people including celebrities such as Rose McGowan, Bjork and David Beckham.

- February, 2022 – Be yourself, Everyone else is already taken, The Herbert, Coventry, United Kingdom
- November, 2019 – Be yourself, Everyone else is already taken, Stary Browar, Poznań, Poland
- July, 2019 – Be yourself, Everyone else is already taken, Pan Museum, Naples, Italy
- June, 2018 – Be yourself, Everyone else is already taken, Harpa Conference Center, Reykjavík, Iceland
- December, 2016 – Be yourself, Theater of Self, Miami Art Basel, United States
- January, 2016 – Be yourself, Everyone else is already taken, Savannah College of Art and Design, Atlanta, Georgia, United States.

In 2017, Lismore was invited to exhibit alongside Lina Condes at the Palazzo Pissani during the Venice Biennale. For the show, he 3D scanned himself and presented a series of sculptures.

== Campaigning ==
Lismore is an active campaigner and is an ambassador of the climate change charity Cool Earth. He has worked closely with Vivienne Westwood on her Climate Revolution projects and also undertook voluntary work for the charity Icross and NWI in Kenya. In 2016, he was the face of H&M's "Close the Loop" Campaign to help encourage recycling of clothes. Lismore's personal wardrobe archive spans highlight his commitment to sustainable fashion.

In 2016, Lismore caused a stir when a controversial photograph of him, taken beside the British UKIP politician Nigel Farage was published on The Evening Standard. In the photo, Lismore can be seen with a word of "four little letters" (beginning with 'c') written on his right hand, which is pointing at the politician.

== Publications ==
In 2016, Skira Rizzoli Publications in New York published the first monograph of his work, Be yourself; everyone else is already taken. Contributors include Stephen Fry, Hilary Alexander, Debbie Harry, Matt Lucas, Edward Enninful, Stefano Pilati, Boy George, and Vivienne Westwood. The book was launched at the opening of the show at Art Basel in Miami, United States in December 2016. In June 2017, to celebrate the book's publication in the UK, he was invited by The Victoria and Albert Museum to present a talk in conversation with eminent fashion editor Hilary Alexander to discuss the subject of personal identity and style today.

== Awards ==
In October 2016, Lismore became a public ambassador for the Tate.

In 2017, Lismore was listed in Out Magazine's "Out 100" alongside Stephen Fry and was listed #80 in the Top 100 of The Guardian's Pride Power List 2018, 2021 & 2022.
