= Arml =

ARML may refer to:

- Augmented Reality Markup Language, a standard to describe Augmented Reality scenes and environments
- American Regions Mathematics League, an annual high school mathematics team competition
