= Zadie Xa =

Canadian visual artist

- Born: 1983 (age 42–43); Vancouver, British Columbia, Canada
- Education: MA in Painting, Royal College of Art, 2014; BFA, Emily Carr Institute of Art and Design, 2007
- Known for: Artist
- Website: https://www.zadiexa.com/

Zadie Xa (born 1983) is a Korean-Canadian visual artist who combines sculpture, painting, light, sound, video, and performance to create immersive multi-media experiences. Drawing inspiration from fields such as ecology, science fiction, and ancient religions, her work explores how beings imagine and inhabit their worlds. Her work is centered on otherness and is informed by personal experience within the Korean diaspora, as well as by environmental and cultural contexts of the Pacific Northwest.

Xa's work has been shown in solo and group exhibitions at numerous galleries in Canada, the United States, and Europe, including Serpentine Gallery in London, UK; Palais de Tokyo, in Paris, France; Polygon Gallery in North Vancouver, British Columbia; and Remai Modern in Saskatoon, Saskatchewan, Canada, among others. Xa's work is also in the holdings of the permanent collection at The Box, Plymouth (previously the Plymouth City Museum and Art Gallery).

In addition, Xa has been a participant in the 58th Venice Biennale in 2019, the 13th Shanghai Biennale in 2020, and Frieze Live 2020.

In 2020, Xa was a recipient of the Sobey Art Award, Canada's largest prize for young Canadian artists. In 2025, she was nominated for the Turner Prize.

== Early life and education ==
Xa was born in Vancouver, British Columbia, and was raised by her mother, an immigrant from South Korea. Xa is now based in London, United Kingdom.

Xa earned a BFA at the Emily Carr Institute of Art and Design (now the Emily Carr University of Art + Design) in 2007. After graduating, she lived in Madrid for four years. She then moved to London to attend the Royal College of Art, where she earned an MA in Painting in 2014.

== Work ==
Xa's visual and performance work is inspired by street style, music videos, quilting techniques, and traditional clothing, among other sources, and frequently references the performing arts, religion, and folklore of Korea. The primary method Xa uses in her work as a visual artist is collage and assemblage, in which she cuts, layers, and pastes different elements and media to create a new work.

In 2018, following her participation as a solo artist in the Frieze Art Fair that year, the Contemporary Art Society’s Collections Fund at Frieze acquired a cloak and mask related to Xa's performance practice. The work was purchased along with the first film installation of American artist Kehinde Wiley. Both acquisitions were donated to The Box Plymouth (previously the Plymouth City Museum and Art Gallery), located in Plymouth, Devon, UK, to be part of the museum and art gallery's permanent collection.

== Select works ==
=== Solo exhibitions ===
- 2020-2021: Moon Poetics 4 Courageous Earth Critters and Dangerous Day Dreamers, at the Remai Modern, Saskatoon, Canada, and Leeds Art Gallery, UK
- 2017: The Conch, Sea Urchin and Brass Bell, at the Pump House Gallery, London, UK

=== Group exhibitions ===
- 2021: Interior Infinite, The Polygon Gallery, North Vancouver, Canada
- 2020: The Word for Water is Whale, 13th Shanghai Biennale: Bodies of Water, Shanghai, China

=== Performances ===
- 2021: Scorpion, in collaboration with Benito Mayor Vallejo, National Gallery London, UK
- 2020: Dream Dangerous, in collaboration with Benito Mayor Vallejo, Jia-Yu Corti, and Ophelia Liu, Frieze Live 2020: The Institute of Melodic Healing, London, UK
- 2019-2020: Grandmother Mago, at the Art Gallery of Ontario, Toronto, Canada and the Venice Biennial's “Meetings on Art” performance program, Venice, Italy
  - This work explores a fictional grandmother-shaman figure and is influenced by talchum, a traditional Korean mask dance.
- 2018: Flooded with ICE/Hellfire Can't Scorch Me, Hayward Gallery, Southbank Center, UK
- 2018: Iridezcent Interludez, “Do Disturb 2018”, Palais de Tokyo, Paris

=== Sobey Art Award ===
Zadie Xa was nominated for the Sobey Art Award in 2020 and was on the longlist as a representative of the West Coast and Yukon region (other geographic categories for the Sobey Art Award include the Prairies and North, Ontario, Quebec, and the Atlantic). That year, the program award fund was equally awarded to 25 finalists, including Xa, Joseph Tisiga, Sara Cwynar, Caroline Monnet, and Jordan Bennett, among others.

=== 2025 Turner Prize ===
Zadie Xa was one of four artists shortlisted for the 2025 Turner Prize; the other nominees were Nnena Kalu, Rene Matić, and Mohammed Sami.
