= Enter Art Fair =

Art fair in Copenhagen, Denmark

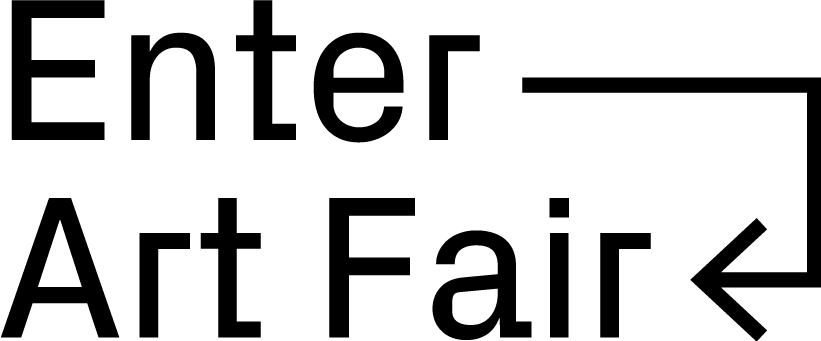

Enter Art Fair is Scandinavia's largest art fair and is held annually in Copenhagen, Denmark. The fair takes place over four days in late August, and brings together over 90 galleries from more than 20 countries and 40 cities at Lokomotivværkstedet, a 10,000 m^{2} historic events venue. The fair attracts about 25,000 visitors a year and includes an arts program and outdoor exhibition space.

== Background ==
Enter Art Fair was founded by Julie Leopold Alf who initiated and launched Code Art Fair at Bella Centeret. Enter Art Fair focuses on international contemporary art compared to other art fairs in the region. The fair is backed by Danish investor Lars Seier Christensen among others, and has since its inception had a strong focus on digital art and new ways to experience and acquire art. Galleries apply to participate and a curatorial committee selects these according to specific criteria. The galleries present paintings, sculptures, glass art, ceramics, graphics, video, photography and digital art. Enter Art Fair includes an Art Program, Digital Section, Young Galleries Section and Sculpture Garden.

The inaugural event was held in 2019 in a 3,000 m^{2} tent at Refshaleøen and included 35 international galleries attracting 6,000 visitors. The fair moved to Tunnel Fabrikken in Nordhavn in 2020 and included 50 galleries attracting 20,000 visitors. At the 2022 edition, 78 galleries from 23 countries were represented along 350 artists and 60 institutions. Since 2023, the fair has been located at the large events location Lokomotivværkstedet, which formerly was used for maintenance of the Danish locomotives.

=== Art Program ===
The Art Program was introduced by Julie Leopold in 2020 and champions artistic expression and emerging artists. From 2020 to 2022, Irene Campolmi ran the trilogy performance program "A Space of Intimacy" which invited artists, including Michele Rizzo, Miles Greenberg and Fallon Mayanja, to respond to issues of identity, sound and technology. She was in 2022 recognised by art critic Maria Kjær Themsen for curating the best performance of the year in Denmark. In 2024, Diana Velasco curated the Art Program with a focus on digital art for the first time. The program has since its inception been supported by the Danish Art Foundation, Augustinus Fonden and Ny Carlsberg Foundation.

- The 2020 edition was titled "Thinking Feelings" and included a performance exploring the Black body in space and "hyper-romantic" gesture by artist Miles Greenberg.
- The 2021 edition was titled "The Shape of Sound" and included sound installations by artists Stine Deja, Marie Munk and Jens Settergren. Based on theories by Julia Kristeva, Boris Groys, and Mihay Csikszentmihalyi, a dance performance by artist Michele Rizzo and composer Lorenzo Senni explored the interaction between techno music, dance and para-religious practices. In addition, artist Fallon Mayanja presented the performance "Feminine" which explored composer Julius Eastman's original composition "The Holy Presence Of Joan D'Arc" and curator Legacy Russell's Glitch Feminism: A Manifesto.
- The 2022 edition was titled "A Space of Intimacy" and included a performance on queer love by artist Jules Fischer and cello musician and composer Josefine Opsahl. The performance was acknowledged for its innovative approach by curator and author Maria Kjær Themsen in the newspaper Information.
- The 2023 edition presented Austrian-Uzbek artist Nikima Jagudajev's ongoing live performance, "Basically", at the main entrance of the fair. Here nine artists invited visitors to interact with them in a playful performance blurring the boundaries between art and space. On the last day, Danish artists Nicolai Risbjerg, Jonas Sørensen, Kristoffer Raasted and Mia Winding performed four pieces in collaboration with Art Hub Copenhagen.
- The 2024 edition was curated by Diana Velasco for the first time. Titled "Betwixt - Analogue and Digital Realms", it included talks, performances and artworks spanning AI, VR, NFTs and digital interventions. The Art Program explored the term "phygital” through physical and digital realms. Highlights included the artist LoVid (US) interactive webcam piece "Heartsleeves" and the artist duo Operate (US) presented "Human Unreadable" which showcased generative digital motifs and algorithm-based choreography. A new performance piece was made especially for Enter Art Fair by the French multimodale artist group, consisting of dancer and choreographer Natacha Paguignon, dancer Kynsie Serre, AR producer Maxime Touroute, musician Odalie and four Augmented Reality dancers. Performed twice a day, spectators experienced how the physical and digital art world collide at four site-specific locations at the fair.

=== Digital Section ===
The Digital Section spotlights the convergence of technology and creativity, showcasing digital artworks that are redefining contemporary art. Galleries and their artists has presented curated booths with digital paintings and illustrations, 3D printed sculptures, augmented reality (AR) and interactive digital installations, video art, generative art, NFTs (Non-Fungible Tokens) and blockchain-based art. In 2024, artists included Line FInderup, Monica Rizzolli, Lolo & Sosaku, Stephan Breuer, Gordon Cheung, Mohsen Hazrati, Genesis Kai, Charlie Stein, Michael Wesely, Kristian Levin, David Lisser, Jenni Pasanen, Irina Angles and Dr. Formalyst, and Lauren Moffatt.

=== Young Galleries Section ===
Enter Art Fair’s Young Galleries Section includes galleries that are five years or younger and a strong focus on emerging artists. The Monocle magazine said: "It’s a smart move that dispels any notions of the art world’s stuffiness while providing it with a much-needed breath of fresh air." In 2023, The Danish Arts Foundation awarded Galleri Maria Friis, represented in the Young Section, a special recognition for the gallery’s innovative curation of their booth.

== See also ==
- Art Basel
- Frieze Art Fair
- The Armoury Show
- Art Cologne
- India Art Fair
