= 2025 Turner Prize =

British prize for contemporary art

The 2025 Turner Prize was awarded to Nnena Kalu for her sculptures and drawings. Announcing the prize, the jury praised the "bold and compelling work" and "the powerful presence" of her works. Kalu was awarded £25,000 in a ceremony held at Bradford Grammar School.

The other nominees were Rene Matić, Mohammed Sami, and Zadie Xa. The nominees' work is being shown at Cartwright Hall Art Gallery in Bradford as part of its UK City of Culture celebrations.

== Nominations ==
The Turner Prize is named after the English landscape painter J. M. W. Turner and is awarded annually to a British visual artist. The 2025 nominees were announced on 23 April, Turner's 250th birthday.

The chair of the prize jury was Alex Farquharson, the director of Tate Britain, and the other jurors were Andrew Bonacina, Sam Lackey (the director of the Liverpool Biennial), Priyesh Mistry (of the National Gallery), and Habda Rashid (of the Fitzwilliam Museum). Farquharson compared the nominees' art, such as Xa's and Sami's, to Turner's own paintings.

=== Nominees ===
Kalu was nominated for her presentation as part of Conversations at the Walker Art Gallery in Liverpool and Hanging Sculpture 1 to 10 at Manifesta 15 in Barcelona. She creates hanging shapes by wrapping fabrics and other materials. The jury praised "her unique command of material, colour and gesture" and "highly attuned responses to architectural space". Kalu has limited verbal communication and had been an artist with Action Space, a charity which assists artists with learning disabilities, for over 25 years when she was nominated. She was the first artist with learning disabilities to be nominated for the prize.

Matić was nominated for their solo exhibition AS OPPOSED TO THE TRUTH, which dealt with the rise of right-wing populism, at CCA Berlin. Their work shows personal photographs mixed with sound and other elements. The jury were impressed by Matić's power to consider identity. said the show was about people "holding on to one another, caring for each other, and learning to live with vulnerability." Aged 27, they were the youngest nominated artist, and the youngest since Damien Hirst in 1995.

Sami, the highest-profile nominee, was nominated for his solo exhibition After the Storm at Blenheim Palace in Oxfordshire. His art shows "dreamlike scenes" without people, explores "memory and loss", and reflects his experiences of the Iraq War and time as a refugee in Sweden. The jury praised his "powerful representation of war and exile".

Xa was nominated for her presentation Moonlit Confessions Across Deep Sea Echoes: Your Ancestors Are Whales, and Earth Remembers Everything with Benito Mayor Vallejo at Sharjah Biennial 16. The New York Times described it as "large-format paintings, recorded sounds and an arrangement of 650 brass wind chimes inspired by Korean shamanic ritual bells". The jury described her work as "a sophisticated development of Xa's reflective and enchanting practice".

== Turner Award exhibition ==
The nominees' work is currently being shown in an exhibition at Cartwright Hall Art Gallery in Bradford from September 27, 2025. The exhibition will run until 22 February 2026, and is part of Bradford's UK City of Culture celebrations. By the time the prize was awarded, 34,000 people had visited the exhibition.

Reviewing the show for The Guardian, Adrian Searle described Matić's work as "at once rich and sparse, restrained and confessional", and Sami's as "equally unsettling and deliberately ambiguous", but less convincing. He called Xa's installation a "woozy, overwrought and overthought exercise in luxury brand shamanism", but praised the variety and physicality of Kalu's sculptures and stated that she deserved to win the prize. In the same newspaper, Jonathan Jones described the shortlist as "soppy", lacking the controversy of previous Turner Prizes and political engagement, but said that Sami was the best artist in the group and "a shoo-in" to win.

Artnet described Kalu's drawings as "charged, swirling vortexes", Matić's as "an uplifting celebration of resilience and defiance", Sami's as "mesmerizing" and "haunting", and Xa's as "enchanting, immersive" and "immediately spectacular". The article stated that Kalu was the standout artist, but that critics thought Sami most likely to win.

ARTnews said that the prize had lost status in recent years, and doubted that the shortlisted works would cause the stir of Damien Hirst's Mother and Child Divided.

Meanwhile, The Daily Telegraph said that the nominees had "an emphasis on concept over competence", adding that the prize had lost its innovative spirit and should be scrapped.

== Winner ==
The winner was announced on 9 December at a ceremony at Bradford Grammar School, close to Cartwright Hall. The prize was announced by the magician Steven Frayne. Kalu was awarded £25,000, and the other nominees were given £10,000. Kalu is the first artist with a learning disability to win the prize; however, Farquarson stated that the award had been made on merit alone.

Announcing the prize, the Tate said:

The jury awarded the prize to Nnena Kalu, who creates hanging sculptures from wrappings of different materials making cocoon-like shapes, as well as large-scale drawings made with vigorous, rhythmic lines. The jury commended Kalu's bold and compelling work, praising her lively translation of expressive gesture into captivating abstract sculpture and drawing. Noting her distinct practice and finesse of scale, composition and colour, they admired the powerful presence these works have.

Kalu accepted the award wearing a rosette saying "Idol, Legend, Winner, Whatever", a comment a workshop participant had made about her. Two of her team accompanied her on stage, and Charlotte Hollinshead, Kalu's facilitator and studio manager, said that Kalu had made history.

The Guardian called her a worthy winner, while ARTnews said that "the reactions to Kalu’s victory suggest that the award had at least gone to the right person".
