= Lina Condes =

Ukrainian artist

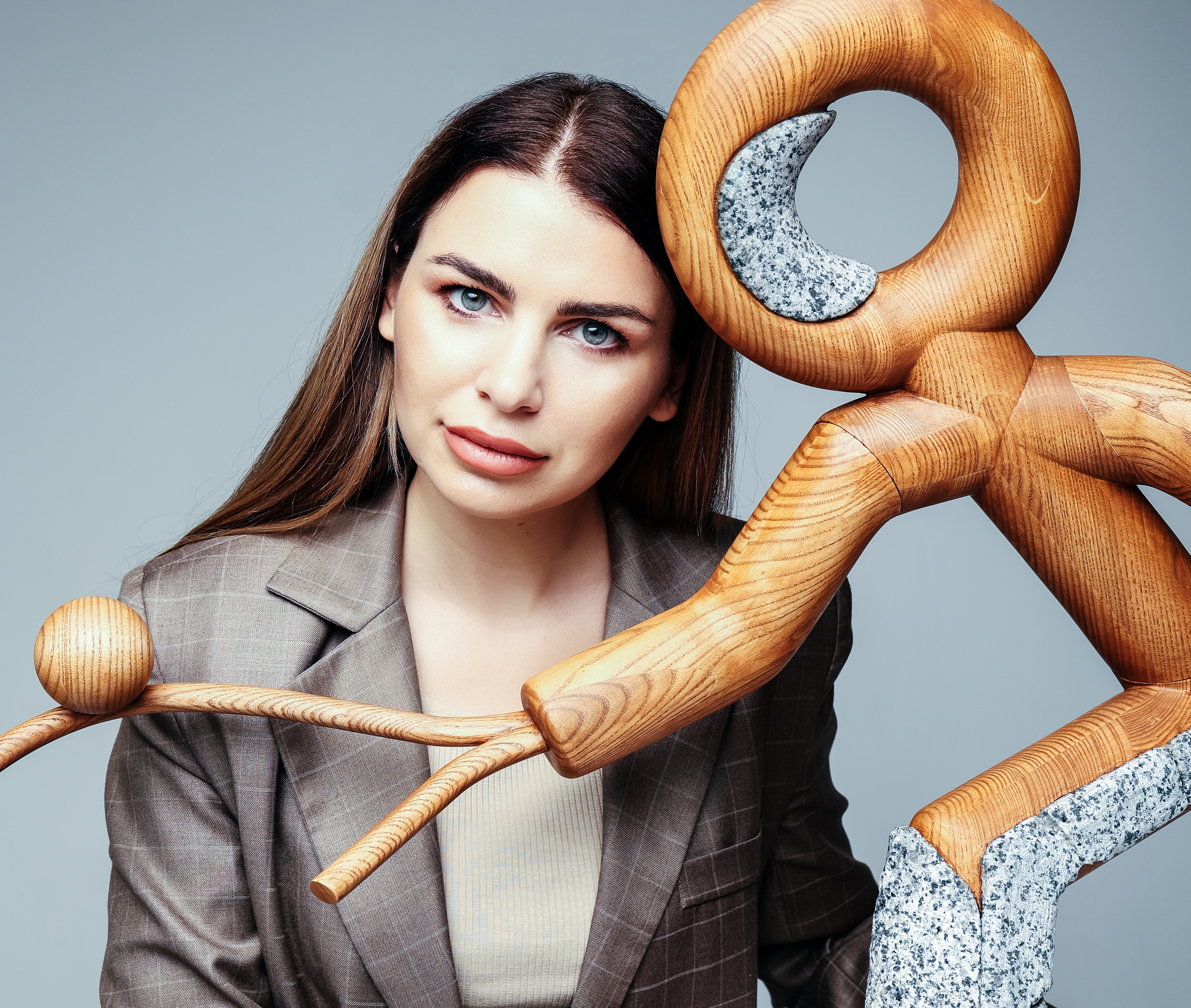
- Born: 3 November 1988 (age 37); Cherkasy, Ukraine
- Known for: sculpture
- Movement: Pop art

Lina Condes (Ukr. Лiна Кондес; born 3 November 1988, Cherkasy city, Ukraine) is a Ukrainian artist. She is known for her stick figure sculptures, through which she seeks to authentically represent the emotional and mental lives of modern people. Condes focuses on ‘mental states’ — different emotions and psychological conditions — by blending materials, shapes and colors. She has exhibited in Kyiv, London, Miami and New York.

== La Biennale di Venezia ==
Condes presented "Sphinx", an interactive sculpture in which a watchful eye merges with a stylized body observing what surrounds it, sometimes with benevolence, sometimes with malevolence, during 57th International Art Exhibition – La Biennale di Venezia.

== Career ==
2020

Christies’ group show “Educate”, NYC

2019

Christmas Public Art Installation. Flushing, Queens. Crossing Art Gallery, NYC

Art Miami Public Art Installation. Art Miami Organization. FL

Delano Hotel Public Art Installation. FL

Group show “Heat”. Biennale di Venezia. Venice, Italy

Solo show “Dwellings of Eternity”. Crossing Art gallery. NYC, USA

Art New York. NYC, USA

Art Palm Beach. Miami, USA

2018

Art Display during New York Fashion Week. New York (USA)

Art Palm Beach. Miami (USA)

“Eternity” auction by Paddle8 x SOS by Lena Perminova x Magdalena M. Gabriel

“Endless Summer” charity auction & golf event. Los Angeles, USA

On the top of the world (Art Jed Gallery / St. Moritz)

Art Palm Beach (Avant Gallery)

2017

Solo project "Extraterrestrial Odyssey" during Biennale Di Venezia'57

Red Dot Show during Art Basel Miami

Fontainbleau Miami Beach (Lina Condes' Art Display during Art Basel Miami)

Delano South Beach (Lina Condes' Art Display)

Epic Hotel Art Display (Avant Gallery) during Miami Art Week

2016

Scope Show during Art Basel Miami (Avant gallery Miami)

Istanbul Contemporary (M17 Contemporary Art Center)

Solo exhibition "Art Fusion" SV gallery. Beirut (Lebanon)

Solo exhibition "Hard Art" M17 Contemporary Art Centre. Kyiv(Ukraine)

International exhibition of sculptures and installations "Open19" Stucco Museum. Venice (Italy)

Art video "Hard Art"

Art video "Sphinks"

Art video "Pulsation"
