= Rene Matić =

British visual artist

- Born: 1997 (age 28–29); Peterborough, Cambridgeshire, England
- Education: Central Saint Martins (BA, 2020)
- Occupation: Visual artist
- Known for: Photography; film; installation
- Awards: Turner Prize nominee (2025)

Rene Matić (born 1997) is a British artist based in London. Their practice encompasses photography, film, and installation, engaging with subcultures, identity, faith, family, and the liminal spaces of Britishness. In 2025, they were nominated for the Turner Prize for their solo exhibition As Opposed to the Truth at CCA Berlin.

== Early life and education ==
Matić was born in Peterborough, Cambridgeshire to an English mother and an English-born Irish-Saint Lucian father. Matić graduated from Central Saint Martins in 2020.

== Selected work and exhibitions ==
Matić’s photographic series flags for countries that don’t exist but bodies that do (2018–ongoing) weaves together intimate portraits, political ephemera, and club culture as a site of queered identity and resistance.

Solo and duo exhibitions include upon this rock at South London Gallery (2022), which featured sculptural work, film about the artist’s father, and photography exploring British skinhead subculture and diasporic family history.

== Awards ==
They were nominated for the 2025 Turner Prize and were awarded the Spirit Now London Acquisition Prize at Frieze Art Fair London, with works acquired by The Hepworth Wakefield permanent collection. Matić is the second-youngest artist to be nominated for the Turner Prize. The jury praised Matić's ability to express "concerns around belonging and identity" through an intimate body of photographs of family, friends and everyday scenes, paired with sound, banners and installation. The exhibition of the four shortlisted artists was held at Cartwright Hall in Bradford from September 2025 to February 2026 as part of the city's UK City of Culture programme; the prize went to Nnena Kalu in December 2025.
