= Art Madrid (Spain) =

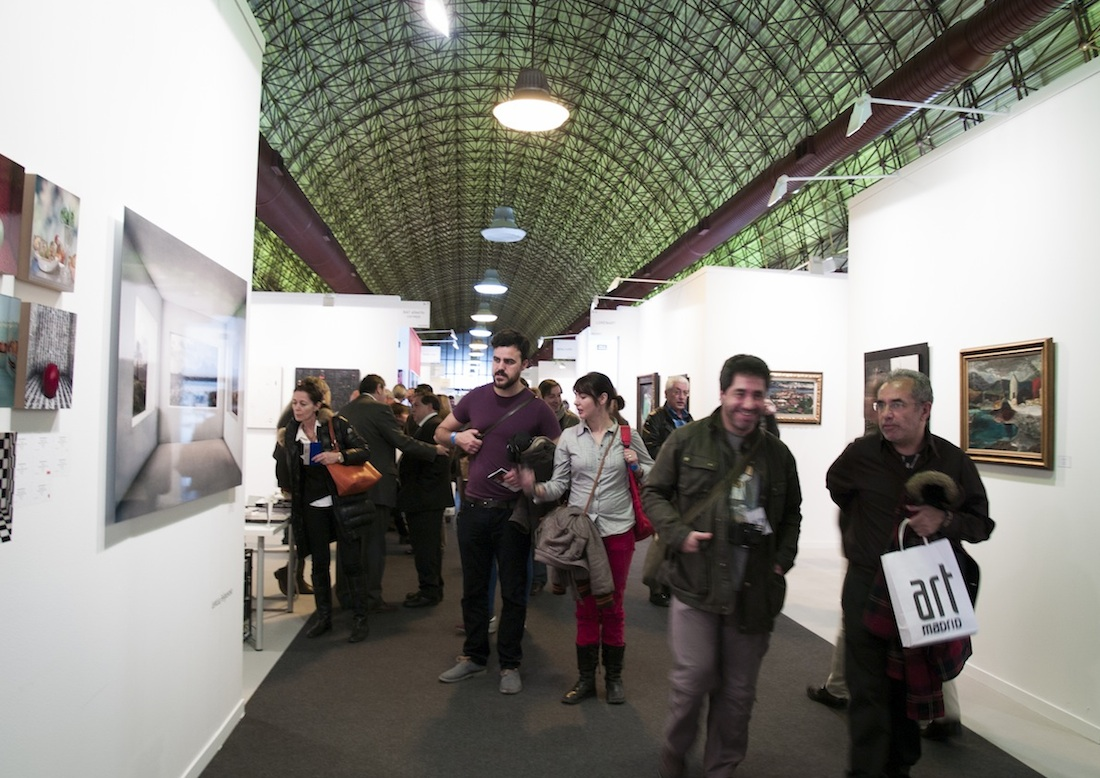
Art Madrid 13

Art Madrid is a contemporary art fair organized since 2006 by the company Arte y Asociados in Madrid, Spain. It takes place around the same time as ARCO (the International Fair of Contemporary Art). By number of galleries, it is the second largest contemporary art fair in Spain.

In its third annual event, Art Madrid, 80 galleries of modern art and contemporary art were present, 59 from Spain, and 21 from other nations. In 2007, it received 23,000 visitors and sales surpassed 20 million Euros.

From September 25 to October 1 2008, Arte y Asociados, Art Madrid's organizing company, launched the first edition of FIART Valencia, the "International Fair of Modern and Contemporary Art of Valencia". The fairgrounds at the Feria de Valencia pavilions included 4,000 square meters of exhibition space and a projection of 50 participating galleries. The event coincided with Habitat Valencia Forward, which includes the International Furniture Fair of Valencia and the International Decoration Fair.

== Galleries in Art Madrid 2008 ==
- A. Cortina - Barcelona
- Ab - Antoni Botey - Barcelona
- Alba Cabrera - Valencia
- Aleph - Ciudad Real
- Alexandra Irigoyen - Madrid
- Angel Guido Art Project - Argentina
- Anquins - Reus
- Antonio Prátes - Portugal
- Art Lounge - Portugal
- Arte & Arte Gallery - Madrid
- Arte Privado - Argentina
- Artetrece - Madrid
- Atelier - Barcelona
- La Aurora - Murcia
- Barcelona - Barcelona
- Bat Alberto Cornejo- Madrid
- Beaux Arts Gallery – Miami (EE.UU.)
- Benlliure - Valencia
- Bennassar - Baleares
- Carlos Teixidó - Barcelona
- Carme Espinet - Barcelona
- Carmen Del Campo - Córdoba
- Clave - Murcia
- Comosmoarte - Alicante
- Cordeiros Galería - Portugal
- Cornión - Asturias
- Del Cisne - Madrid
- Del Palau - Valencia
- El Museo - Colombia
- Felisa Navarro - Álava
- Flecha - Madrid
- Francesc Llopis - Barcelona
- Friends Art - Barcelona
- Gabriel Vanrell - Baleares
- Galiano - Cuba
- Gallery Bandi - Corea
- Gallery Lazar Vujic - Eslovenia
- Giart - Girona
- Gómez Turu Gallery - Barcelona
- Hispánica - Madrid
- Jordi Pascual - Barcelona
- Katuin - Holanda
- Levy - Alemania
- Lina Davidov - Francia
- Lorenart - Madrid
- Luis Burgos - Madrid
- Manel Mayoral - Barcelona
- Maneu - Baleares
- Marges U - Girona
- Marimón - Baleares
- Marita Segovia - Madrid
- Michael Schmalfuss - Alemania
- Mikel Armendia - Navarra
- Mito - Barcelona
- Múltiple - Madrid
- Muro - Valencia
- Nave Del Arte - Madrid
- Paloma Larroy - Madrid
- Perve - Portugal
- Pilares - Cuenca
- Praxis - Nueva York (EE.UU.)
- Preciado Fine Art – Miami (EE.UU.)
- Principal Art - Barcelona
- Punto - Valencia
- El Quatre - Barcelona
- Rafael Lozano - Madrid
- Raiña Lupa - Barcelona
- Rayuela - Madrid
- Rita Castellote - Madrid
- Rosalía Sender - Valencia
- Sao Mamede - Portugal
- Sen - Madrid
- Servando - Cuba
- Set Espai Dart - Alicante
- Tizas - Madrid
- Toulouse – Rio de Janeiro (Brasil)
- Trazos Gallery - Canadá
- Tres Punts - Barcelona
- Vali30 - Valencia
- Xanon - Bilbao
