= Abdul Karim Al-Orrayed =

Bahraini artist (1934–2025)

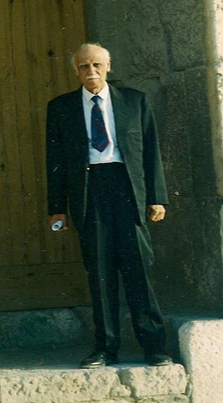
- Born: 1934; Bahrain and its Dependencies
- Died: 25 March 2025 (aged 90–91)

Abdul Karim Al-Orrayed (Arabic: عبد الكريم العريض; 1934 – 25 March 2025) was a Bahraini artist who co-founded the Arts Amateurs Association and Bahrain Contemporary Arts Association alongside Rashid Oraifi and Hussain AlSini.

== Biography ==
Al-Orrayed established the first private art gallery in Bahrain in 1960. He attended most of the Arts Amateurs Association's exhibitions. He was a member of the Bahrain Delegation to the First Conference of the Plastic Arts in the Arab World in Syria in 1975.

Orrayed died on 25 March 2025.

== Exhibitions ==
Al-Orrayed participated in all exhibitions of arts for Bahraini artists mounted by the Ministry of Information; all Spring Art Exhibitions held by the Contemporary Arts Association; the 1976 exhibition of the Arab Union for Plastic Arts in Rabat; the 1977 Second Arab Art Exhibition in Algiers; the 1981 Bahrain Art Exhibition in Singapore; the 1983 Fourth Arabic Biennial in Jordan; the 1984 Cairo Biennial; and the 1984 Exhibition of the Bahrain Contemporary Art Association –Oman. He had personal exhibitions in 2002 and 2007.

== Books ==
- Window on History 1999.
- Art Harvest 2002.
- Manama through Five Centuries 2006.
- English edition of Manama People & Heritage 2009.
- Days Of Art & Literature 2013.

== Prizes ==
Al-Orrayed won several prizes in Bahrain and abroad including the 1984 State Art Encouragement Award, the 1999 Al Dana Golden Award in Kuwait. In 2007, he was awarded the Shaikh Isa Medal for his contributions to art.
