= Margarete Palz =

German textile artist (1937–2025)

Margarete Palz (28 September 1937 – 30 December 2025) was a German textile artist. After studying craftmanship and art history in Saarbrücken, she taught art at a high school in Zweibrücken until 2000. Thereter she drew upon her creative talents, especially for designing exotic dresses which have been exhibited in Germany and beyond. For these she has received a series of awards, most recently as the winner of the 2021 Wearable Art Competition in Mandurah, Australia.

== Early life ==
Born in 1937 in Moravská Ostrava, Czechoslovakia, Margarete Palz and her family were expelled after World War II and settled in Zweibrücken when she was 11 years old. As there was practically nothing in the shops, her maternal aunt showed her how to make her own clothes, introducing her to cloth, colour, and wool. From 1957, she studied at the Saar Collage of Art and Design. She went on to study history of art at Saarland University and at the Free University of Berlin until 1961.

== Career ==
In 1966, Palz was appointed a high-school art teacher at the Hofenfels-Gymnasium in Zweibrücken where she remained until 2000. Her initial work was based mainly on abstract art and graphics, inspired by her instructor Oskar Hohlwech. She was a member of Neue Gruppe Saar which promoted involvement in art and crafts. Thanks to her brother, the photographer Gerhard Heisler, she discovered the potential of film and photographic paper, the materials she began to use for creating exotic dresses. In this connection, from 1990 she participated in "Unikater Kunstkleider" presenting visionary dance theatre clothing.

In 2006, Palz undertook a teaching assignment at the Mode Design School in Zürich. In addition to several solo exhibitions in the Saarland, Palz exhibited in Los Angeles (2017), Berlin (2014), and Mainz (2008).

== Death ==
Margarete Palz died on 30 December 2025, at the age of 88.

== Awards ==
Palz received a number of awards, including the prize for Creative Excellence, Gen-I, New Zealand (2013) and the Artist of the Year Award for her Oscillating Curves at the Wearable Art Competition, in Mandurah, Australia (2021).
