= Zona Maco =

Art fair in Mexico City

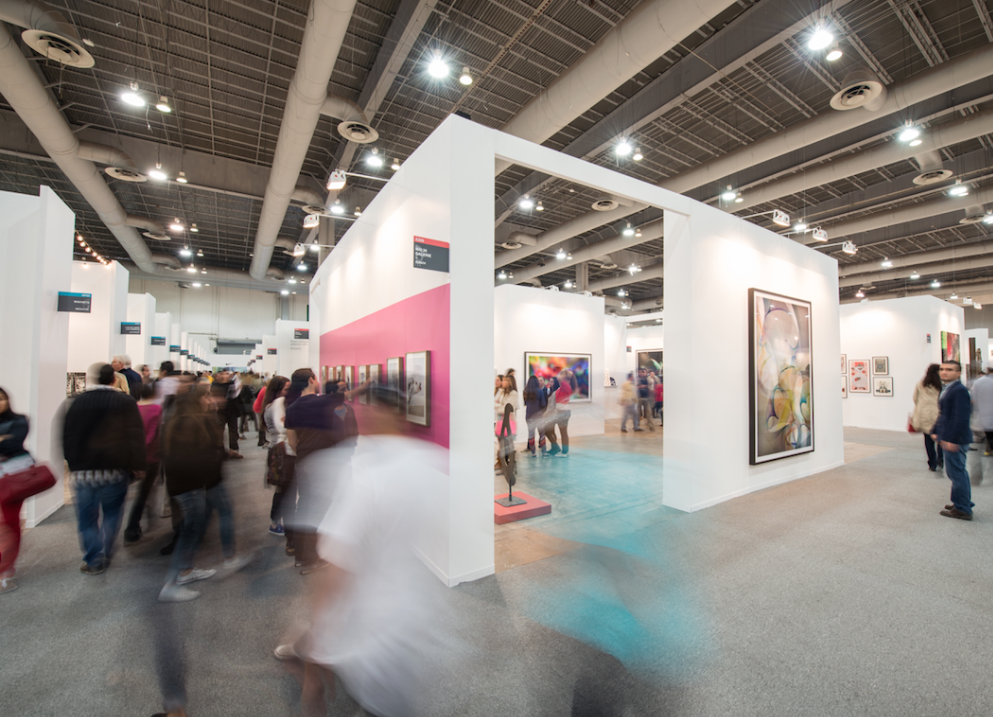
ZⓈONAMACO in 2015

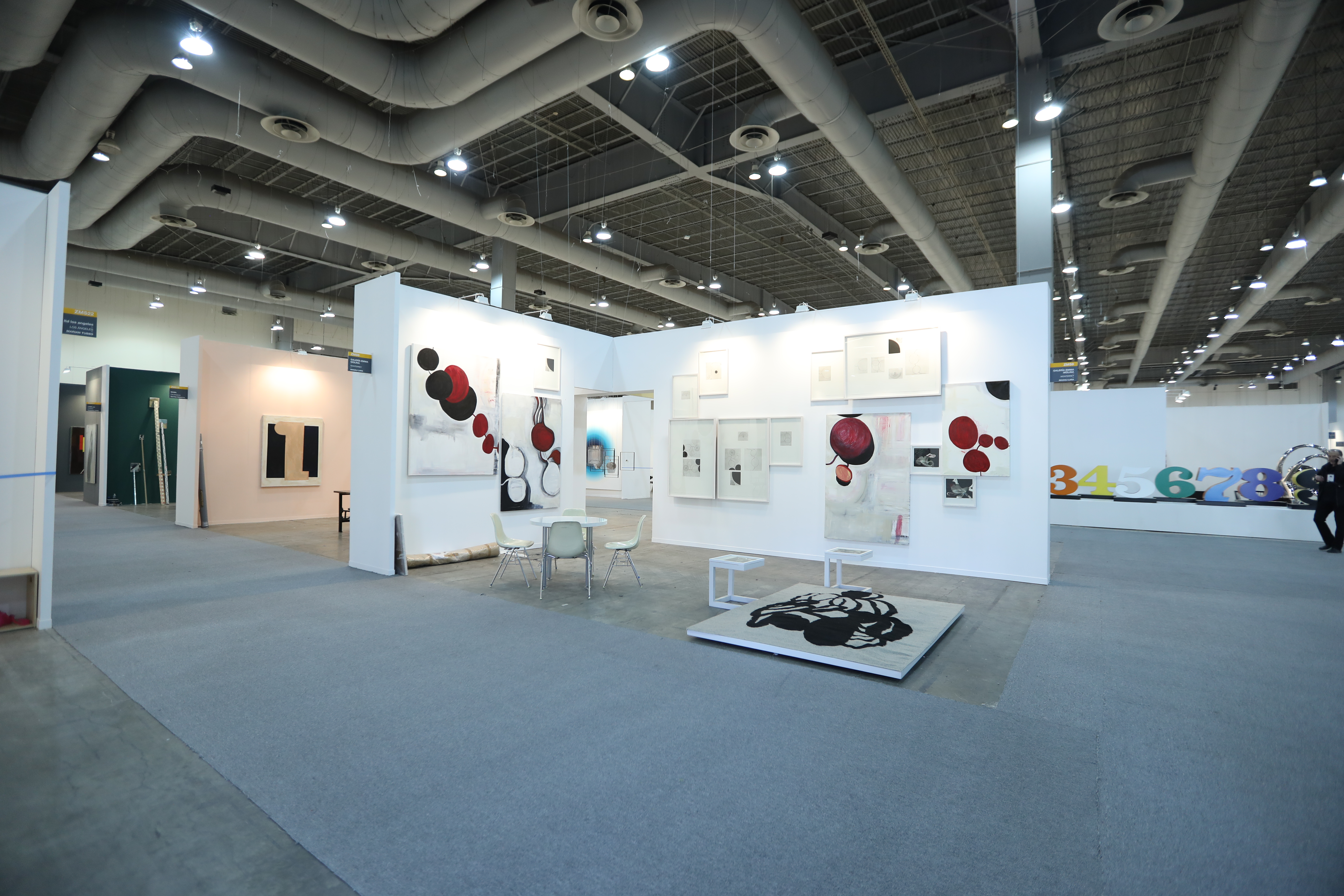
ZⓈONAMACO in 2017

Zona Maco (stylized as ZⓈONAMACO) is an annual international art fair in Mexico City. Founded in 2003 by Zélika García, it is held in February at Centro Citibanamex. “Maco” is an abbreviation of “México Arte Contemporáneo”. It was most recently held February 5-9, 2025.

The fair consists of these events: Zona Maco Arte Contemporáneo showcases contemporary and modern artworks and design; Zona Maco Diseño features furniture, jewelry, textiles, every-day and decorative objects, as well as limited editions and historical pieces; Zona Maco Foto features vintage, modern and contemporary photography and video; and Salón del Anticuario hosts antiquarians.

The fair hosts a program of lectures and activities in museums, galleries and exhibition sites across Mexico City. Zona Maco is the largest Latin American art fair.

== History ==
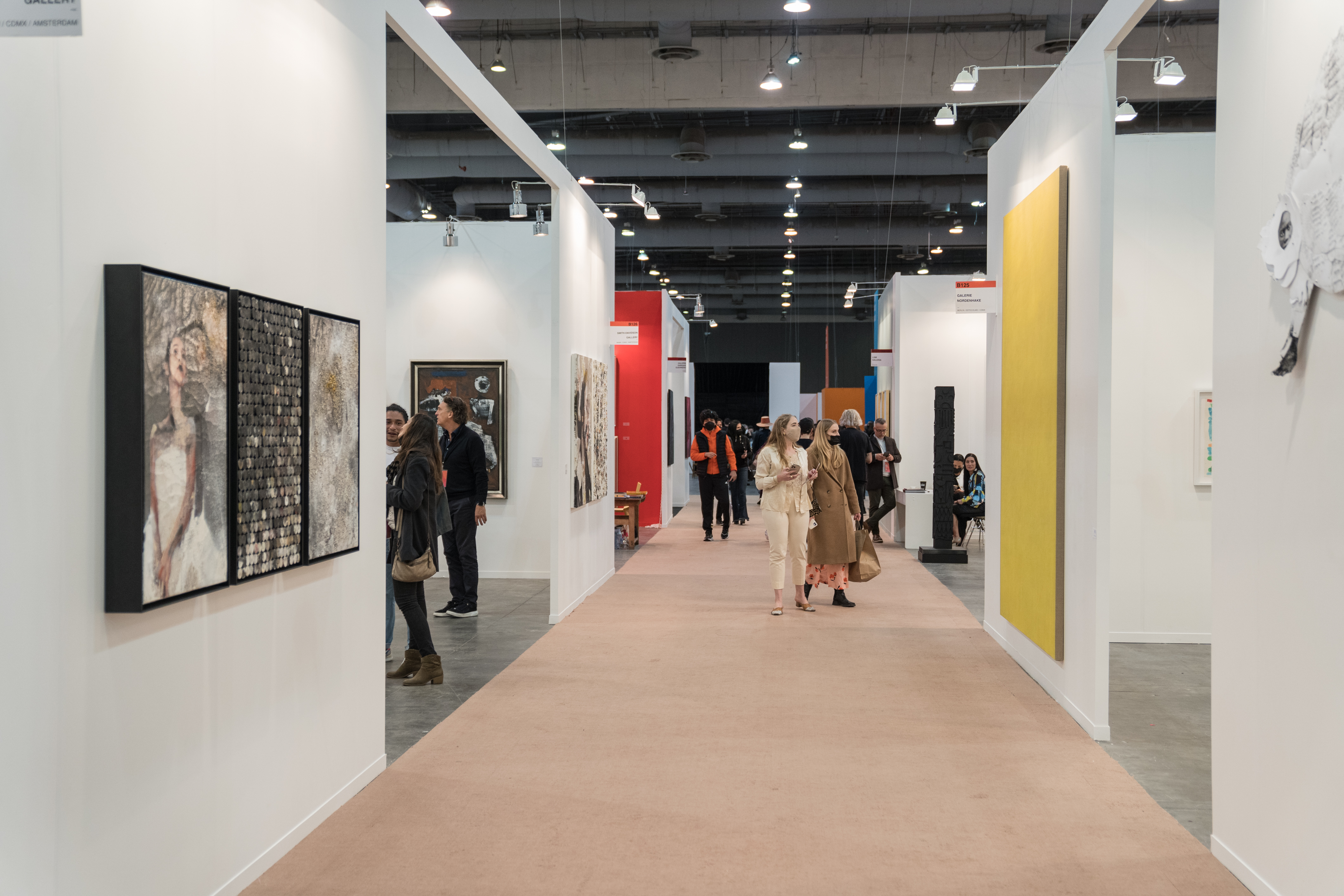
ZⓈONA MACO México Arte Contemporáneo, Edición 2022

Zélika García founded Zona Maco Arte Contemporáneo in 2003, Salón del Anticuario in 2014 and Zona Maco Foto in 2015. García currently serves as Director, while Direlia Lazo serves as Artistic Director.

Zona Maco México Arte Contemporáneo Contemporary Art Mexico was held 2009 - 2016 at Centro Banamex, Mexico City. Zona Maco Foto was held 2015- 2016, at Centro Banamex, Mexico City. Zona Maco Salón del Anticuario Antiquarian Hall was held 2014 - 2016, at Centro Banamex, Mexico City. Feria Internacional de Arte Contemporáneo en México International Contemporary Art Fair in Mexico was held in 2008, at Centro Banamex, Mexico City. Maco México Arte Contemporáneo Contemporary Art Mexico was held in 2007, at Residencial Palmas Park, Mexico City. Maco México Arte Contemporáneo Contemporary Art Mexico was held 2004 - 2006, at Expo Reforma, Mexico City. La Muestra 2 was held im 2003, at World Trade Center, Mexico City. La Muestra 1 was held in 2002 in Monterrey, Mexico.
