= Eva & Adele =

German performance art duo

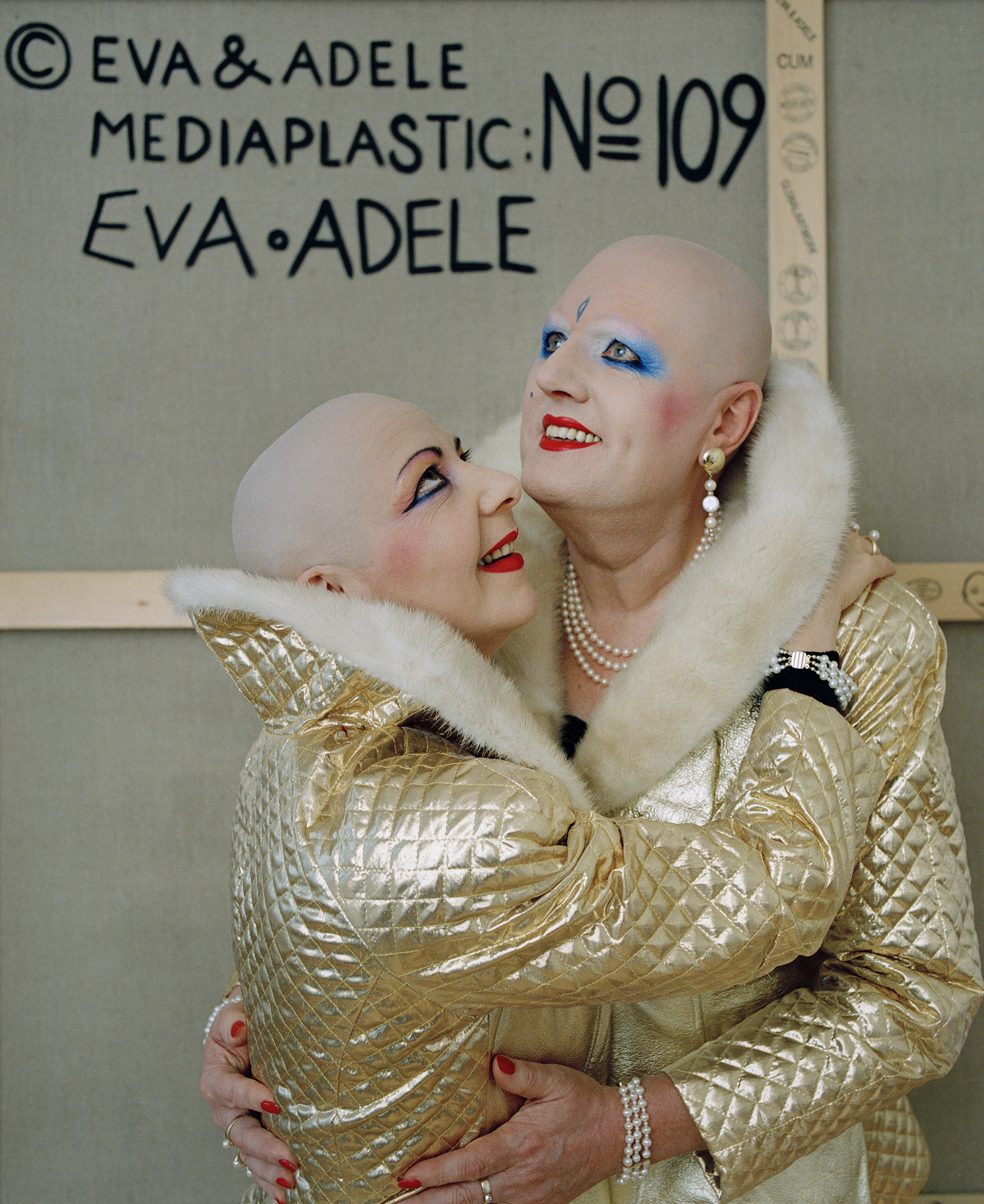
Eva & Adele photographed by Oliver Mark, Berlin 2002

Eva & Adele were an artistic couple who claim to have "landed their time machines" in Berlin after the Wall fell in 1989, claiming to be "hermaphrodite twins from the future". Both refused to reveal their real name or age. They were famous for sharing an invented gender, which is neither male nor female. Eva died in Berlin on 21 May 2025.

They were also known for their performance art. They had been represented by an art gallery since 1997, as they made paintings, video art, photography, and costume design. They also had their own perfume line and a watch with Swatch.

Eva & Adele were known to dress identically in matching makeup, bald heads and ladylike outfits. They were known for promoting trans rights and taking selfies with many fans as part of their art project entitled "Wherever we are is museum."

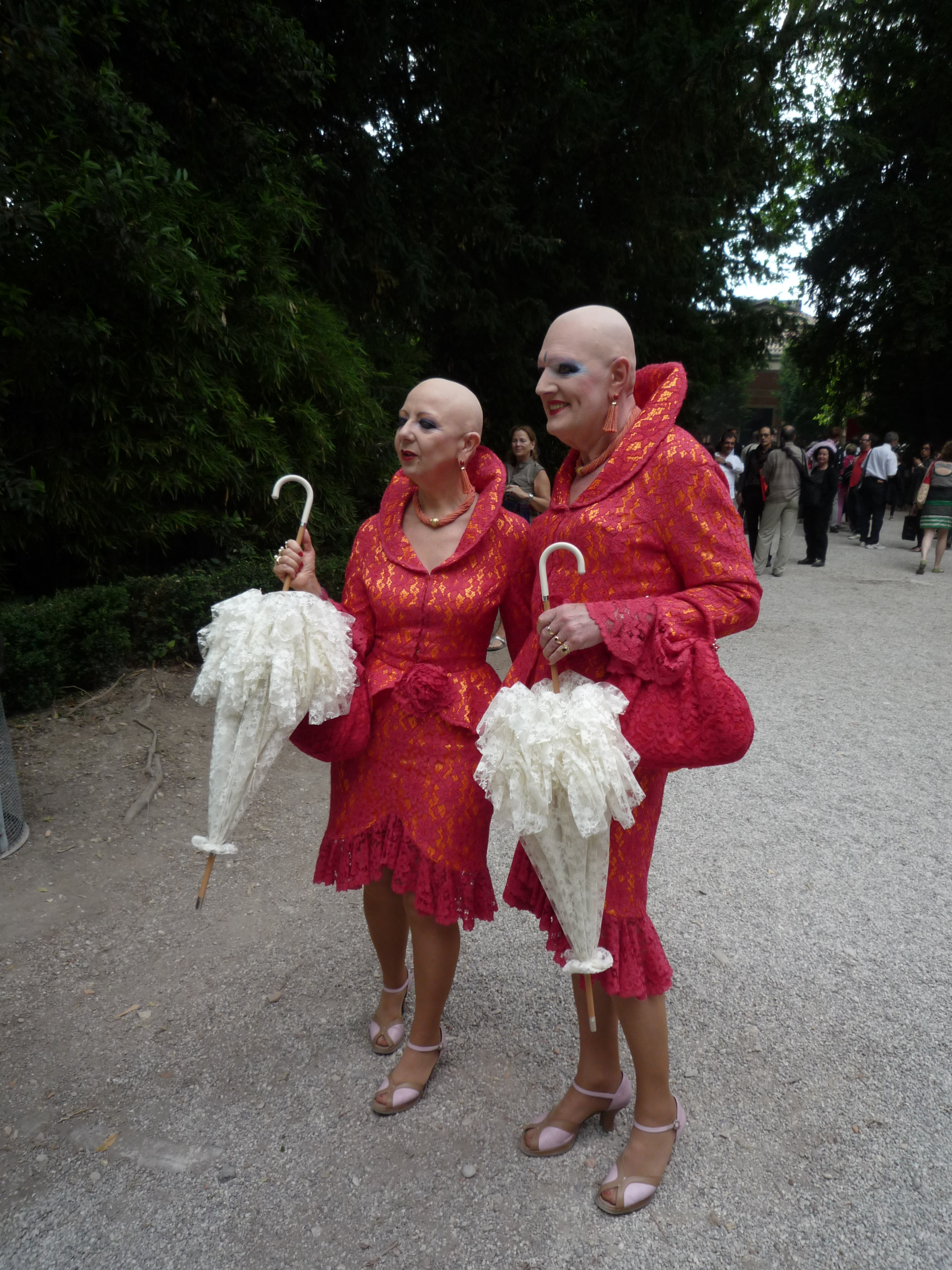
Eva and Adele Venice Bienale 2011

They were recognized as the world's longest running performance art duo and were often photographed as fashion icons at art events, like Art Basel Miami Beach and the Venice Biennale.

== History ==
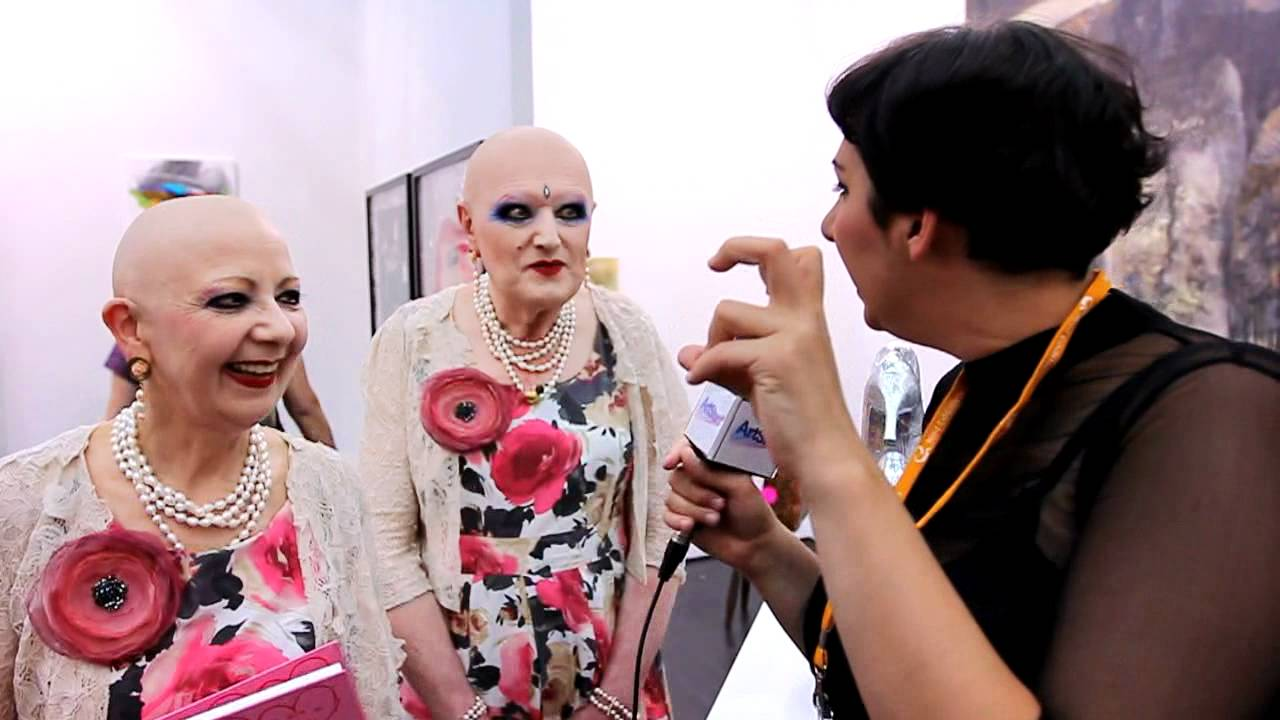
German artists Eva & Adele at the Vienna Art Fair in 2011.

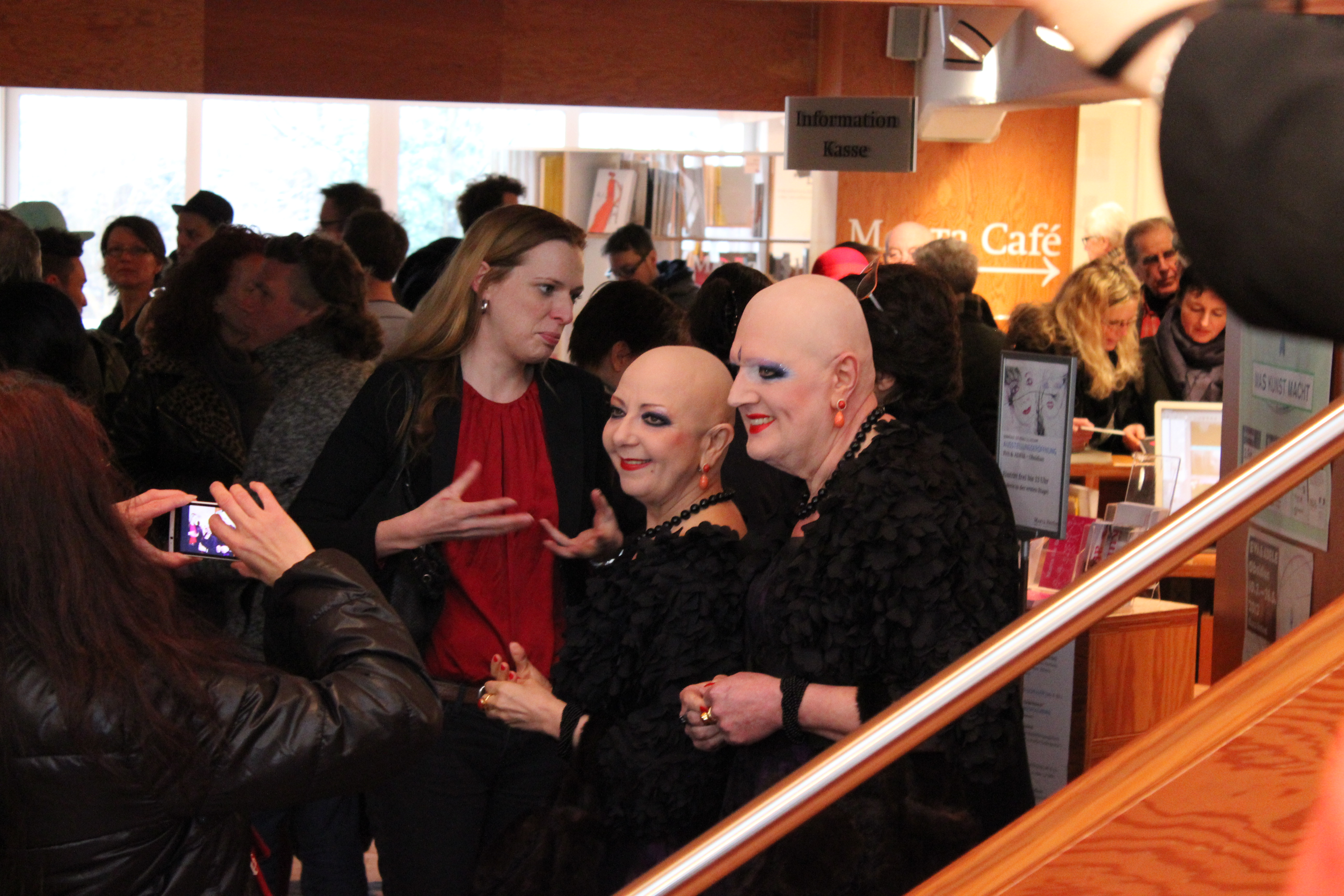
Eva & Adele in 2013 at MARTa Herford Museum in Herford, Germany

The duo claimed that since they met they vowed never to spend a night apart, nor to receive guests in their house without being fully made up. They were married in 2011, after a three year battle to get Eva's sex listed as female on her birth certificate.

Eva (who was taller) argued to the court that although her body was a man, her soul was not. After reading numerous psychiatric and psychological reports, the judge agreed. Eva's birth certificate was then reissued with her sex as female.

They were on many "best dressed" lists. In 2015, they created their own watch with Swatch which was released during the Venice Biennale.

Their philosophy was called "Futuring," a belief that your thoughts create the future, similar to The Secret.

== Artwork ==
In 2018, the duo had a 20 year retrospective featuring their Polaroid photos, paintings, drawings, art installations, and costume design work at the Me Collectors Room, a museum in Berlin, Germany. They also had a retrospective at the Musee d'Art Moderne Paris in Paris, France in 2016.

Their artwork has been called campy, and the duo were described as stalwarts of the Berlin art scene. They were known for looking like "a weird couple."

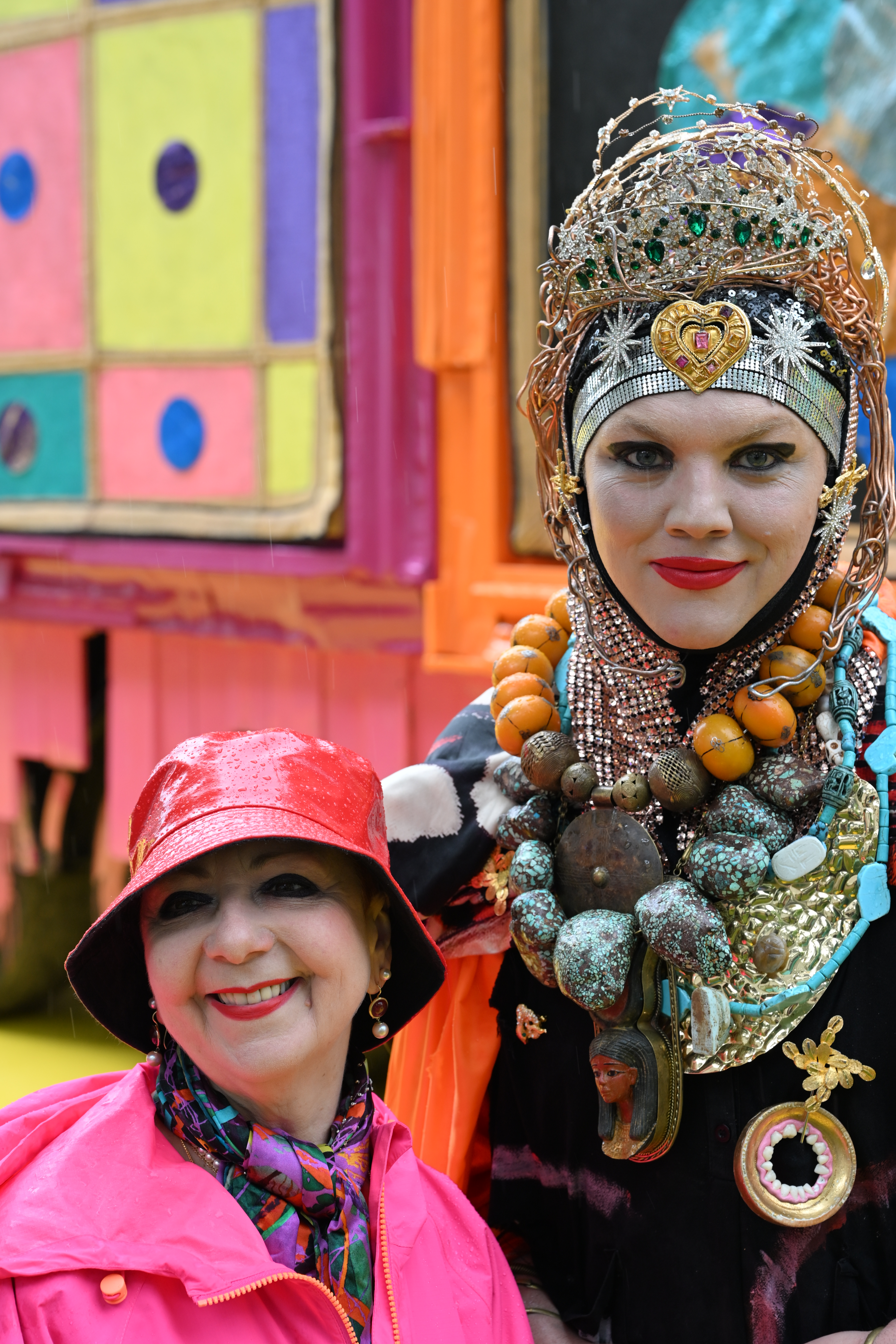
Adele accompanied by Daniel Lismore at the Biennale di Venezia 2026

== In the media ==
From 1997 to 2002 Eva & Adele made appearances on the Channel 4 show Eurotrash as 'The Eggheads.' They were interviewed by many YouTubers and local European TV stations. Many photos of Eva & Adele can be found on photo agency websites like Getty Images and Shutterstock.
