= Xie Lei (artist) =

Xie Lei (born 1983)

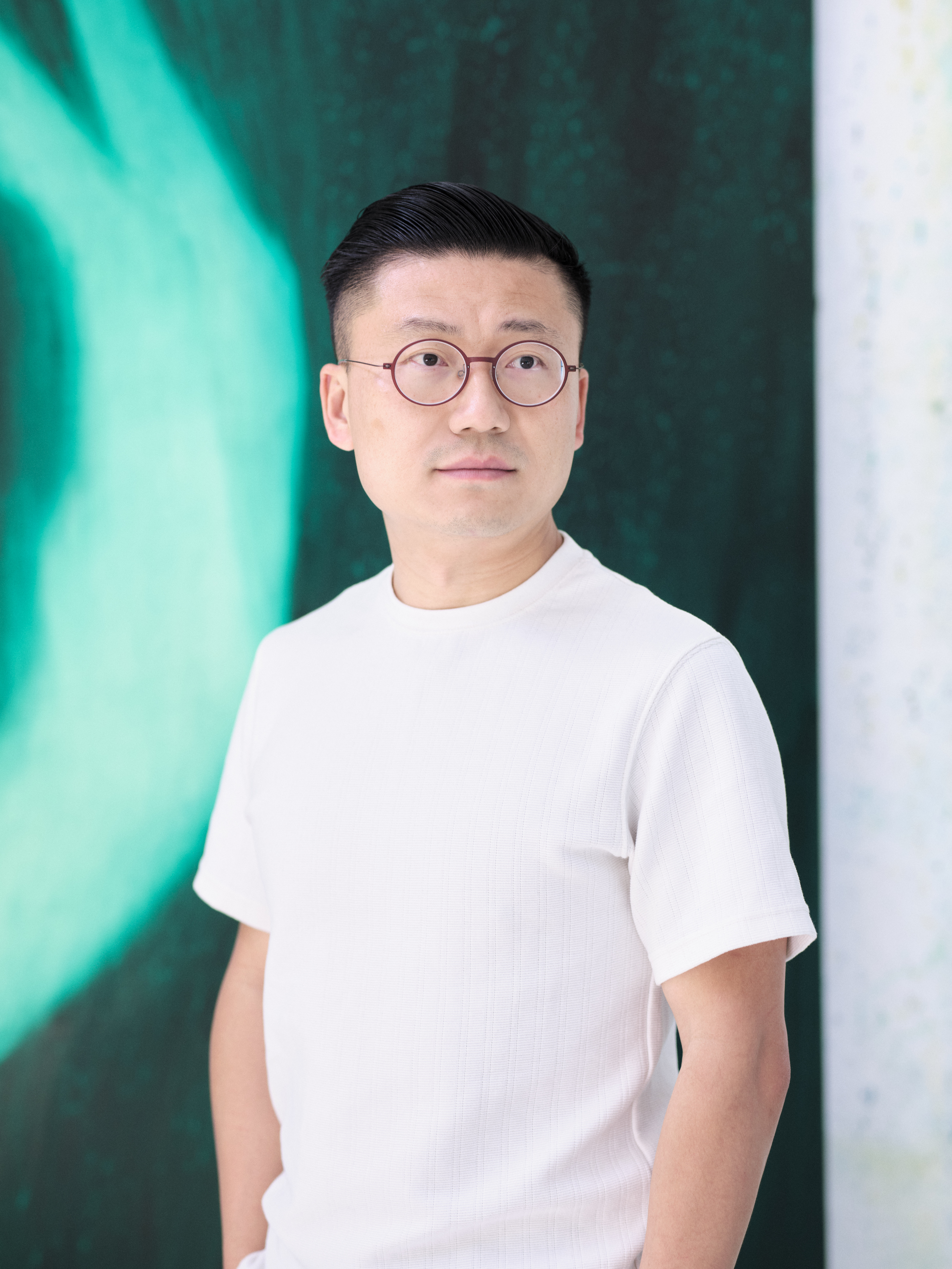
- Xie Lei in 2025
- Born: 1983 (age 42–43); Huainan, China
- Education: Central Academy of Fine Arts; École Nationale Supérieure des Beaux-Arts
- Occupation: Painter
- Awards: Prix Marcel Duchamp (2025)

For the Chinese kickboxer, see Xie Lei.

Xie Lei (born 1983) is a Chinese-born painter who lives and works in Paris. He won the Prix Marcel Duchamp in 2025. For ArtReview, his artwork "explores the tension between visibility and evanescence."

== Education ==
Xie was born in Huainan in 1983 and earned a bachelor's degree at the Central Academy of Fine Arts in Beijing, followed by a master's degree and a doctorate at the École nationale supérieure des beaux-arts in Paris. He also completed a painting research programme at the Royal College of Art in London.

== Work ==
Xie paints from memory rather than from live models, describing his subjects as "chimeras, combinations of elements drawn from my memory". He has cited the painters Eugène Delacroix, Francisco Goya and Diego Velázquez, the psychoanalyst Julia Kristeva, and the Chinese writers Zhuang Zhou and Pu Songling as influences.
