= Gretchen Dow Simpson =

American painter (1939–2025)

- Born: Gretchen Hansell Dow; May 17, 1939; Cambridge, Massachusetts, U.S.
- Died: April 11, 2025 (aged 85); Providence, Rhode Island, U.S.
- Education: Rhode Island School of Design
- Occupation: Painter
- Spouses: John Ramsey Simpson Jr. (m. 1968; div. 1982); James Baird (m. 2013)
- Children: 2
- Website: gretchendowsimpson.com

Gretchen Hansell Dow Simpson (née Dow; May 17, 1939 – April 11, 2025) was an American painter from New England. She is the author of over 60 magazine covers for The New Yorker.

== Background ==
Born Gretchen Hansell Dow on May 17, 1939 in Cambridge, Massachusetts, she was the daughter of Elizabeth Sagendorph Dow and Richard A. Dow, who lived in Dover, Massachusetts. She was educated at the Rhode Island School of Design in Providence, Rhode Island, class of 1961.

== Career ==
Simpson spent many years living in New York City, where she began her career in advertising. She was best known for her paintings of New England architecture, noted for its dedication to geometry and scale. Her work is best known for her attention to details, proportions, and lighting effects. Simpson considered herself a “painter with a photographer’s eye,” and architectural forms always drew her. Between 1974 and 1993, over 50 of her paintings were featured as covers of The New Yorker. Her covers stopped appearing in the magazine when editor Tina Brown began commissioning more topical material for the publication.

Her work has been exhibited in New York City, Maine, and Rhode Island, and many of her paintings are in private collections. In October 2012, a 1,300-square-foot highway mural, based on one of her paintings, was installed on Interstate 95 in Pawtucket, RI as part of the then Rhode Island Governor Lincoln Chafee's Highway Beautification Project.

== Personal life and death ==
On April 20, 1968, she married John Ramsey Simpson Jr, a.k.a. actor John Ramsey. Her two daughters are Megan and Phoebe. John and Gretchen Simpson divorced in 1982. In 2013, Simpson married James Baird, a professor of chemistry at Brown University. The couple lived in Providence, Rhode Island.

In 2005, Simpson received a Pell Grant. In 2009, she received an honorary doctorate from Bryant University, a private university in Rhode Island.

On April 11, 2025, Simpson died at home from complications of Lewy body dementia. She was 85.
