= Joseph Yaeger =

American painter

Josepph Yaeger (born 1986 in Helena, Montana) is an American painter who completed his academic art education in England. He is known for working solely in the medium of watercolor on.heavily gessoed canvas and linen works, many psychological in nature and in paint only revealing some of the alluded to totality.

== Biography ==
Jaeger received his MFA from the Royal College of Art in London 2019.

Yaeger exhibited ten watercolors on gessoed linen at his inaugural solo exhibition at Modern Art in London which ran from November 15, 2025 until January 17. 2026. Like Damian Loeb before him, he employs film stills as source material. Annabel Downes in reviewing Polygraph in the pages of Frieze wrote of the assembled works ..."As you spend time with these paintings, their beginnings as film stills fade, and the figures step forward as the protagonists of a new narrative, assembled in your own mind"...

In September of 2026 a solo exhibition of his work, Agita opened at the Gladstone Gallery in New York City and runs from September 16 until October 31. Shana Nys Dambrot writing in Flaunt says of the works in this exhibition. ..."In a refined earthen and nitrate palette, the sounds of the pictorial space are muffled as if by velvet, and like all hushed tones, one must lean closer to hear them"...

On May 19, 2026 Jaeger's There is a Light and It Always Goes Out (2021) sold for 477,300 $US at Phillips in New York (a new high price st auction for a work by the artist).
