= Kay Smith (artist) =

American painter (1923–2025)

- Born: February 27, 1923; Vandalia, Illinois, U.S.
- Died: February 11, 2025 (aged 101); Chicago, Illinois, U.S.
- Education: Art
- Alma mater: School of the Art Institute of Chicago
- Known for: Paintings and illustrations
- Website: www.kaysmithartist.com

Albina Kathryn Smith (née Metzger; February 27, 1923 – February 11, 2025) was an American visual artist, who specialized in using watercolors and depicting landscapes.

== Early life ==
Smith was born in Vandalia, Illinois, on February 27, 1923. She grew up in Vandalia and was the fourth of six children.

== Career ==
During World War II, Smith moved to Chicago and attended classes at the School of the Art Institute of Chicago. She worked as a commercial illustrator until the 1970s, when she turned to historical subjects. She visited historical sites to depict them accurately and raise awareness about these sites importance to the national heritage.

For 21 years, she taught a watercolor class at the Old Town Triangle Art Center in Old Town, Chicago.

She had produced four books on her artwork and more than 250 paintings. She illustrated over 30 books for Thomas Jones, an editor at J.G. Ferguson Publishing Co.

== Later life and death ==
At the age of 73, Smith was struck by Guillain–Barré syndrome which left her almost paralyzed. After rehabilitation, her daughter encouraged her to keep painting. She was still taking commissions after turning 90. She died in Chicago on February 11, 2025, at the age of 101.

== Awards and recognition ==
In 1994, Smith was named the Artist Laureate of Illinois by The Lincoln Academy of Illinois. On the occasion of her 100th birthday, 27 February 2023 was proclaimed Kay Smith Day in Chicago by the Mayor's office.

== Major works ==
Red Tails escorting the B17s in the permanent collection of the Pritzker Military Museum & Library

Smith's major works include a series of Abraham Lincoln-related sites, Red Tails escorting the B17s on display at the Pritzker Military Museum & Library, and paintings depicting famous Illinois sites on display at the Illinois Governors' Mansion.

She was commissioned by The Ernest Hemingway Foundation of Oak Park to do paintings depicting the Ernest Hemingway books The Snows of Kilimanjaro and The Old Man and the Sea. Some of her Hemingway paintings were exhibited as part of the Hemingway Centennial Celebration in Oak Park in 1999.

Her works have hung in the Harry S. Truman Library and Museum, the Illinois Institute of Technology, the Yorktown Victory Center (Yorktown, VA) and the Three Arts Club in Chicago.

== Bibliography ==
- Edgell, David L. (2006). Managing Sustainable Tourism: A Legacy for the Future. Psychology Press. ISBN 0-7890-2771-2.
- Jones, Thomas C. (1981). So proudly we hail – keystones of American freedom: 375 years of remarkable events prepare the people of America to face the challenge of the '80s. Hall of Fame Press. LCCN 81083601.
- Monroe, Dan, Lura Lynn Ryan, and Kay Lovelace Smith. At Home with Illinois Governors: A Social History of the Illinois Executive Mansion, 1855–2003. [Springfield, IL]: Illinois Executive Mansion Association, 2002. ISBN 0-9725610-0-5 OCLC 51813131
- Whitney, David C., Kay Lovelace Smith, and Thomas C. Jones. The American Legacy: A Pageant of Great Deeds and Famous Words. Chicago: J.G. Ferguson, 1975. OCLC 2205978
- Whitney, David C. and Kay Lovelace Smith. The Colonial Spirit of '76: The People of the Revolution: The Lives of Members of the Continental Congresses and Other Prominent Men and Women of the Period. Chicago: J.G. Ferguson Pub. Co., 1974. OCLC 1229396
