= Art Jakarta =

Contemporary art fair in Indonesia

- Genre: Arts festival
- Frequency: Annually
- Locations: Jakarta, Indonesia
- Country: Indonesia
- Inaugurated: 2009
- Next event: October 2026
- Website: https://artjakarta.com/

Art Jakarta is a contemporary art fair, held annually at Jakarta International Expo in Kemayoran, Jakarta, Indonesia. The fair has been organised by PT Artindo Jakarta Seni Kini since 2019, and was previously known as Bazaar Art Jakarta. Artists, galleries, collectors, and art critics from all over the world participate in this fair. The fair is already established as one of Southeast Asia's most significant art fairs.

== Chronology ==
Since its inception in 2009 up to 2016 the fair was known as Bazaar Art Jakarta (BAJ), held at The-Ritz Carlton Pacific Place, Jakarta. In its last edition as BAJ, 23 overseas and 19 local art galleries took part. More than 1,500 art pieces were displayed in the fair.

In 2017, Bazaar Art Jakarta changed its name to Art Jakarta and was held from 28 to 30 August. Among the galleries attending were Jakarta's Vivi Yip Artroom and Ruci Art Space, Bandung's Lawangwangi Creative Space, Zola Zulu and Singapore's Art Xchange Gallery, Art Front Gallery Element Art Space, Pearl Lam Galleries and Yavuz Gallery.

The 10th edition of Art Jakarta was held in 2018, from 2 to 5 August, presenting 51 art galleries. As many as 20 galleries came from Indonesia and the rest were from overseas. Among the galleries were ROH Projects, Gajah Gallery, RUCI Gallery, Mizuma Gallery, Lawangwangi Creative Space, YEO Workshop, Image Warehouse, Museum MACAN, Ciputra Museum and many others. A segment called Japan Art Now presented the 10 Japanese artists, along with sessions to celebrate 10 years of the fair and talks with artists. Art Jakarta 2018 presented more than 1,000 works from more than 300 artists both local and international.

From 2019 to 2023, Art Jakarta moved to a bigger venue, Jakarta Convention Center (JCC) in Senayan, Jakarta, under the leadership of a new team, Fair Director Tom Tandio and Artistic Director Enin Supriyanto. In 2019, 70 local and overseas galleries from 14 countries took part. Among the participants were Singapore based Gajah Gallery, Arario Gallery from South Korea, Mizuma Gallery from Japan, Galerie Ovo from Taiwan along with local galleries such as Nadi Gallery, Semarang Gallery and Can's Gallery. Other than galleries and auction houses, Philips Asia displayed artworks, watches and jewelry.

Since 2024, Art Jakarta has found a new home at JIExpo, hosting more local and international galleries at a bigger space. In 2025, 75 galleries from 16 countries participated, marking the fair's biggest number of participants to date. This edition featured Korea Focus, showcasing 12 Korean galleries in collaboration with the Korean Ministry of Culture, Sports and Tourism, and the Korea Arts Management Service, and was attended by first-time participants, which were Artinformal Gallery, EDSU House, Esther Schipper, Kaikai Kiki Gallery, and Nan Ke Gallery.
