= Eduard Carbonell i Esteller =

Spanish Art Historian (1946–2025)

Eduard Carbonell i Esteller (20 January 1946 – 18 August 2025) was a Spanish art historian.

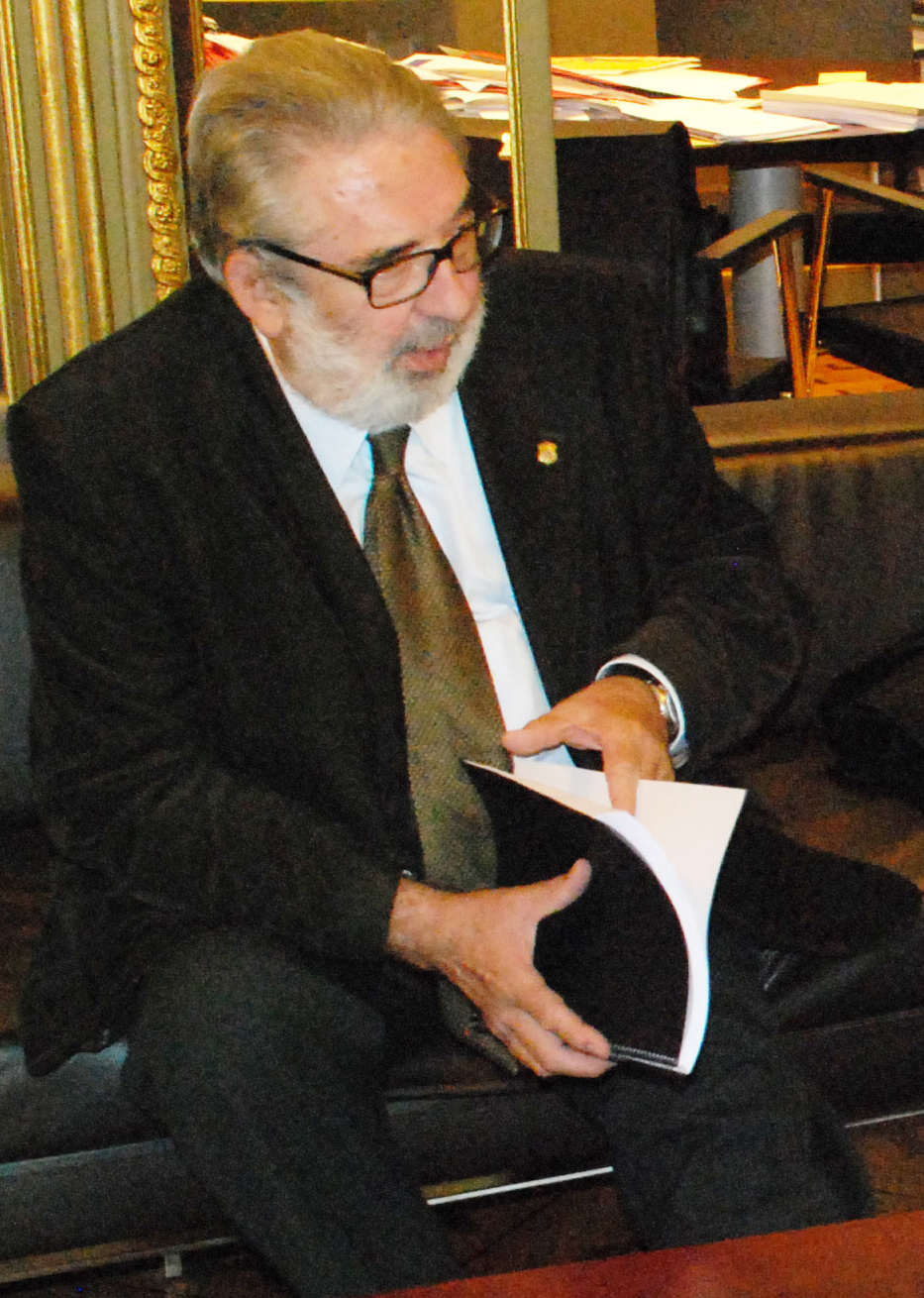
Eduard Carbonell

== Life and career ==
Esteller was born on 20 January 1946. He studied Philosophy and Literature at the University of Barcelona and at the Complutense University of Madrid. He went to Italy to further his studies and later obtained a doctorate in Art History from the University of Barcelona.

For 16 years he was a professor at the UAB. He was a professor of History of Medieval Art at the University of Girona and the UAB. Between 1988 and 1994 he was Director General of Cultural Heritage of the Generalitat of Catalonia. He participated in the creation of the Museum Law of 1990 (17/1990) and in the theoretical conception of the MNAC, an art history museum that was a public entity subject to private law. He was one of those responsible for the exhibition on Caravaggio's work, which took place in 2005.

He was the Director of the National Art Museum of Catalonia, between 1994 and 2005.

Carbonell i Esteller died on 18 August 2025, at the age of 79.
