= Nnena Kalu =

British artist (born 1966)

- Born: 1966 (age 59–60); Glasgow, Scotland
- Occupation: Artist
- Years active: 1980s–present

Nnena Kalu (Igbo pronunciation; born 1966) is a British artist who won the 2025 Turner Prize.

== Early life ==
Kalu was born in Glasgow to Nigerian parents in 1966, and moved to Wandsworth in London at a young age. She is autistic and has limited verbal communication.

She began making art in the 1980s at Hill House day centre in Tooting, in south London.

== Work ==
Kalu began making sculptures around 2010, after making flat artworks for years. She begins with a bundle of paper, cloth, or another base structure, and then elaborates it - often compulsively - by wrapping, layering, and binding materials such as ropes, strips of fabric, unspooled VHS cassette tape, netting and rubbish. Her sculptures are usually made of found materials. In 2013, she began making distinctive drawings which have been compared to whirlpools, usually completed in pairs or trios, sometimes fours or sixes, but not alone. Kalu creates the drawings together, often with her eyes closed.

Critics have focused on the physicality of her work, comparing her sculptures to bodies and "disembowelled organs".

== Career ==
In 1999, Kalu began working as an artist at ActionSpace in Clapham, an organization which assists artists with learning disabilities.

In 2016, her works were shown in Belgium alongside artists such as Laure Prouvost, who won the Turner Prize in 2013; at the 2018 Glasgow International; Humber Street Gallery; and at Studio Voltaire. Her first commercial show was in 2024, at Arcadia Missa in London. The gallery is her official representative.

Creations of Care, Kalu's first major institutional show, was held in 2025 at the Kunsthall Stavanger in Norway. Later in 2025, she won the Turner Prize, the most prominent British art award. The jury nominated her for her work in Conversations at the Walker Art Gallery in Liverpool, and Hanging Sculpture 1 to 10 at Manifesta 15 in Barcelona. The BBC described her winning works as drawings of tornado-like swirls, and brightly coloured sculptures that are wrapped haphazardly with layers of materials such as ribbon, string, card and VHS tape.

She was the first artist with a learning disability to win the prize, and her facilitator and studio manager, Charlotte Hollinshead, made a speech on her behalf, in which she said that Kalu "has faced an incredible amount of discrimination" and hoped that award would help "smash the prejudice away."

Kalu's works have been included as part of the Arts Council Collection and the collection of The Tate.
