= Kininmonth =

Kininmonth is a surname. Notable people with the surname include:

- Alexander Kininmonth (disambiguation)
- Caroline Kininmonth (1907–1978), British artist
- Peter Kininmonth, Scottish international rugby union player, who played for Scotland and the Lions
- William Kininmonth (architect) (1904–1988), Scottish architect whose work mixed a modern style with Scottish vernacular
- William Kininmonth (meteorologist), retired Australian meteorologist and opponent of anthropogenic global warming theory
