= Exeter College =

Exeter College may refer to:

- Exeter College, Oxford, a college of Oxford University
- Exeter College, Devon, a further education college in Exeter, Devon
- Exeter College of Art and Design, a former college in Exeter, Devon
