= Alexander McNeish =

Scottish artist

Alexander McNeish (1932-2000) was a Scottish artist. Alexander McNeish was born at Bo'ness, near Linlithgow on the Firth of Forth, Scotland, the son of a coal miner. He attended Edinburgh College of Art from 1952 to 1957 studying under John Maxwell.

In 1960 he exhibited with Albert Irvin at Galerie Im Griechenbeisl.

In 1963, 10 of his lino prints illustrated a Gael Turnbull book of poetry called A Very Particular Hill, a lino cut of his also illustrated a William McGonagall poem in the British periodical Poor. Old. Tired. Horse.

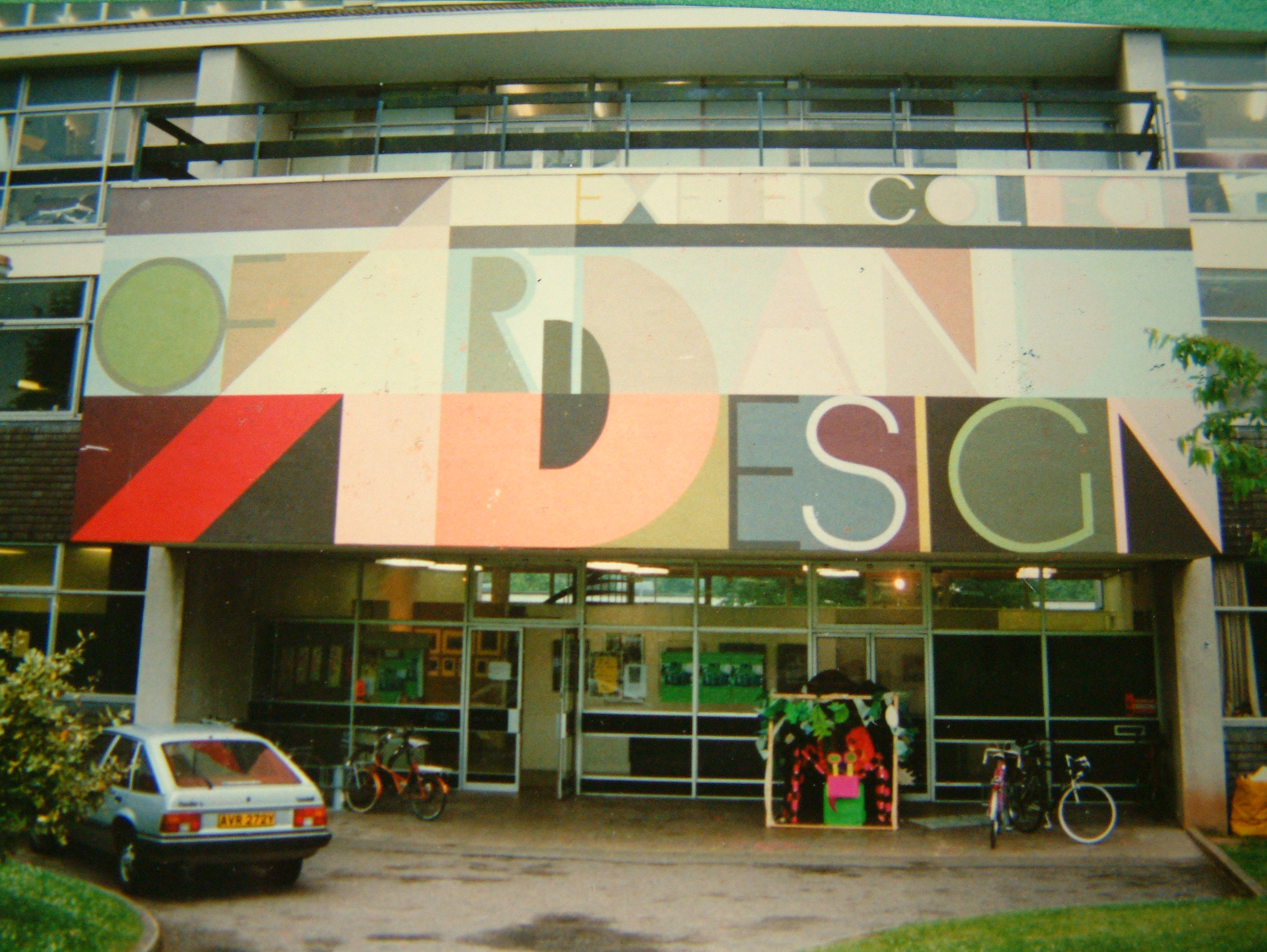
Exeter college of art

He taught at Wolverhampton College of Art in 1962 and was head of painting at Exeter College of Art and Design from 1965 to 1980.

His work can be found in the collections of the Manchester Art Gallery the Royal Albert Memorial Museum, Exeter, the Arts Council and the City Art Centre in Edinburgh. McNeish was one of a group of heavy drinking Scottish art teachers known as the "Scottish Mafia" or "Scotia Nostra".
