= Winifred Rushforth =

Scottish medical practitioner and Christian missionary

Winifred Rushforth OBE
- detail of Jessie Ann Matthew photo
- Born: Margaret Winifred Bartholomew; 21 August 1885; West Lothian, Scotland
- Died: 29 August 1983 (aged 98); Edinburgh, Scotland
- Education: University of Edinburgh
- Known for: Something is Happening: Spiritual Analysis and Depth Psychology in the New Age, Dream Groups
- Spouse: Frank Victor Rushforth
- Scientific career
- Fields: Women's health, surgery Depth psychology Spirituality
- Workplaces: Davidson Clinic

Margaret Winifred Rushforth OBE (née Bartholomew; 21 August 1885 – 29 August 1983) was a Scottish medical practitioner and Christian missionary in India who, influenced by Hugh Crichton-Miller and his friend, Carl Jung, became the founder of a family clinic in Scotland, a therapist, Dream Group facilitator and writer. During a long and active career, spent mostly in Edinburgh, Scotland, she came to be revered and regarded as a local personality for people interested in spirituality and self-actualization.

== Early life and education ==
Rushforth was born in West Lothian, Scotland, in 1885 and educated at the Edinburgh Ladies' College. She was a member of the Bartholomew family, farmers on the Hopetoun Estate since about 1650. Rushforth graduated with an MB ChB from the University of Edinburgh in 1908.

== Career ==
=== India ===
On graduating, she sailed for India to be a medical missionary. There she later met her husband, stockbroker Frank Victor Rushforth (1888–1945), and she spent the best part of the next 20 years as a surgeon and hospital administrator, specialising in women's health.

=== UK ===
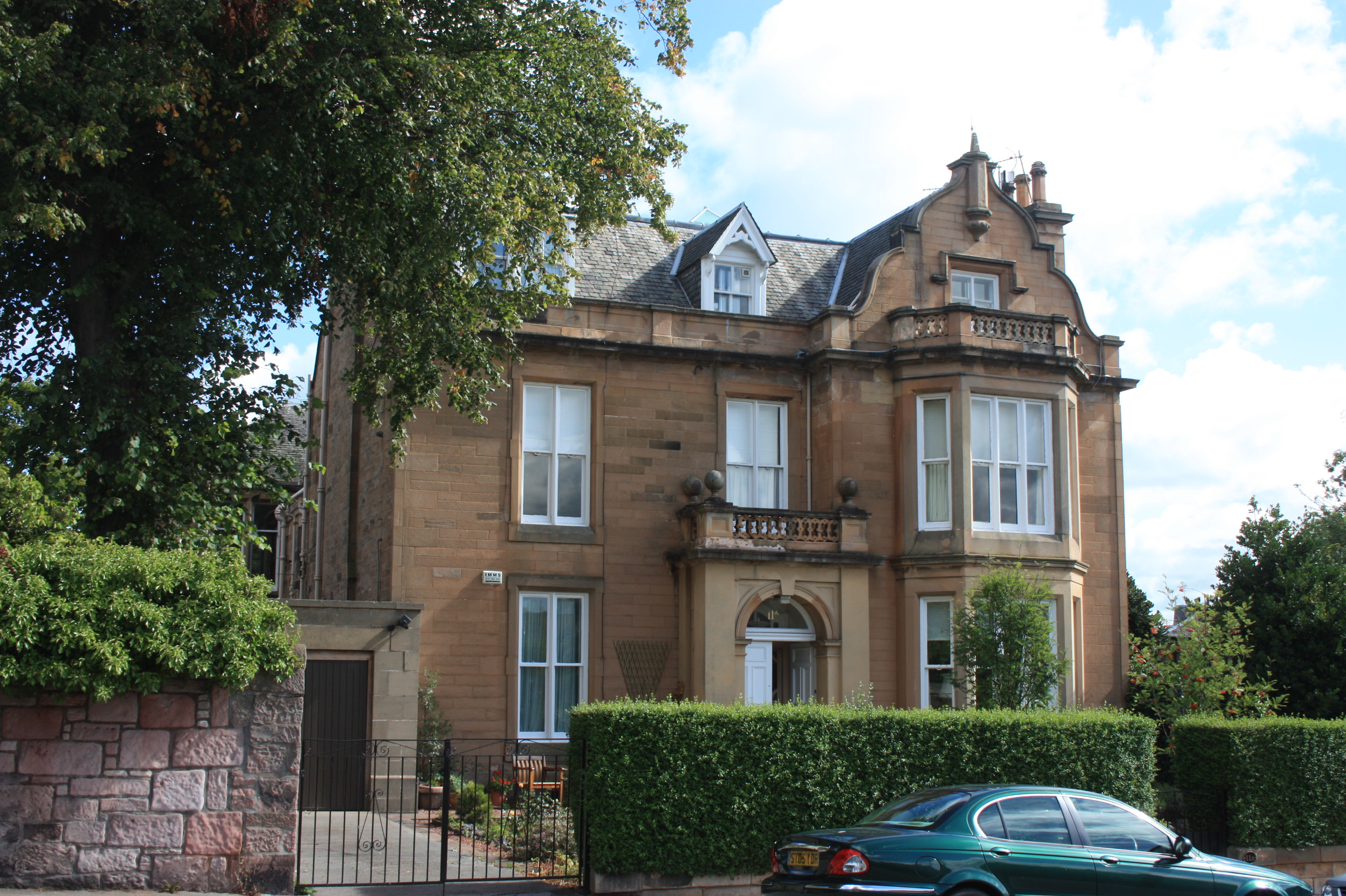
11 Lauder Road, Edinburgh

==== The Davidson Clinic ====
She became interested in psychology and, on returning from India, spent some time working at the Tavistock Clinic in London, alongside fellow Scot, Hugh Crichton-Miller. She became a candidate for training at the Clinic but before completing her studies, her husband took up a position at Edinburgh College of Art, and they moved back to Scotland. She set up a private practice in Edinburgh in 1929. In 1939, during the burgeoning of the Child Guidance movement, she established the Davidson Clinic with the aim of bringing family support and advice to the community, along the model of the pre-war Tavistock Clinic. In 1943 she was joined by the German émigré, Vera von der Heydt who stayed until 1951. She retired from the clinic in 1967 and the following year was awarded the OBE.

==== Wellspring, Sempervivum and the Salisbury Centre ====
In 1978, she was instrumental in setting up Wellspring after the Davidson Clinic closed and its tasks were taken over by the National Health Service in Scotland. In the late 1970s, she established a movement entitled Sempervivum which brought together free thinkers at annual 'Easter Schools'. Dr Rushforth gave regular lectures at the Salisbury Centre, in Salisbury Road, Edinburgh, until her late 90s. She ran weekly dream groups and "Search for God" groups from her house at 11 Lauder Road, Edinburgh, almost until the time of her death.

Her daughter, Dr Diana Bates, continued Rushforth's work and was Director of Wellspring in Edinburgh for some years.

== Personal life ==
Rushforth was interested in C.G. Jung's research into symbolism, spirituality and the numinous. She corresponded with Jung towards the end of his life - although they never met.

For many years, Rushforth was a close friend of Sir Laurens van der Post. She was fascinated, in particular, by his work on the Bushmen of the Kalahari and kept a carved wooden statuette of a bushman, by the contemporary sculptor Christopher Hall, in the drawing room of her home in Edinburgh. Her portrait in the Scottish National Portrait Gallery features the sculpture. It was van der Post who first told Prince Charles about Dr Rushforth's work on dreams and psychoanalysis, and urged the Prince to meet her.

In the early 1980s, Rushforth's book Something is Happening was gifted to Prince Charles by Alick Bartholomew, a relative of Rushforth's, who assisted Prince Charles on the re-decoration of Highgrove House. In March 1983, Prince Charles and Princess Diana visited Dr Rushforth in Edinburgh. They spent an hour discussing Dr Rushforth's theories, on dreams and spirituality, over afternoon tea. Dr Diana Bates, who was also present, later remarked that it was evident how thoroughly Prince Charles had read Dr Rushforth's books and how deeply he had thought about spiritual matters. In the months that followed, Prince Charles wrote regularly to Dr Rushforth and sent her hand-written copies of his forthcoming speeches, for her interest.

== Death and legacy ==
When Winifred Rushforth died, in August 1983, Prince Charles was said to be very taken aback. "If only I had got to know her sooner!" he is said to have exclaimed.

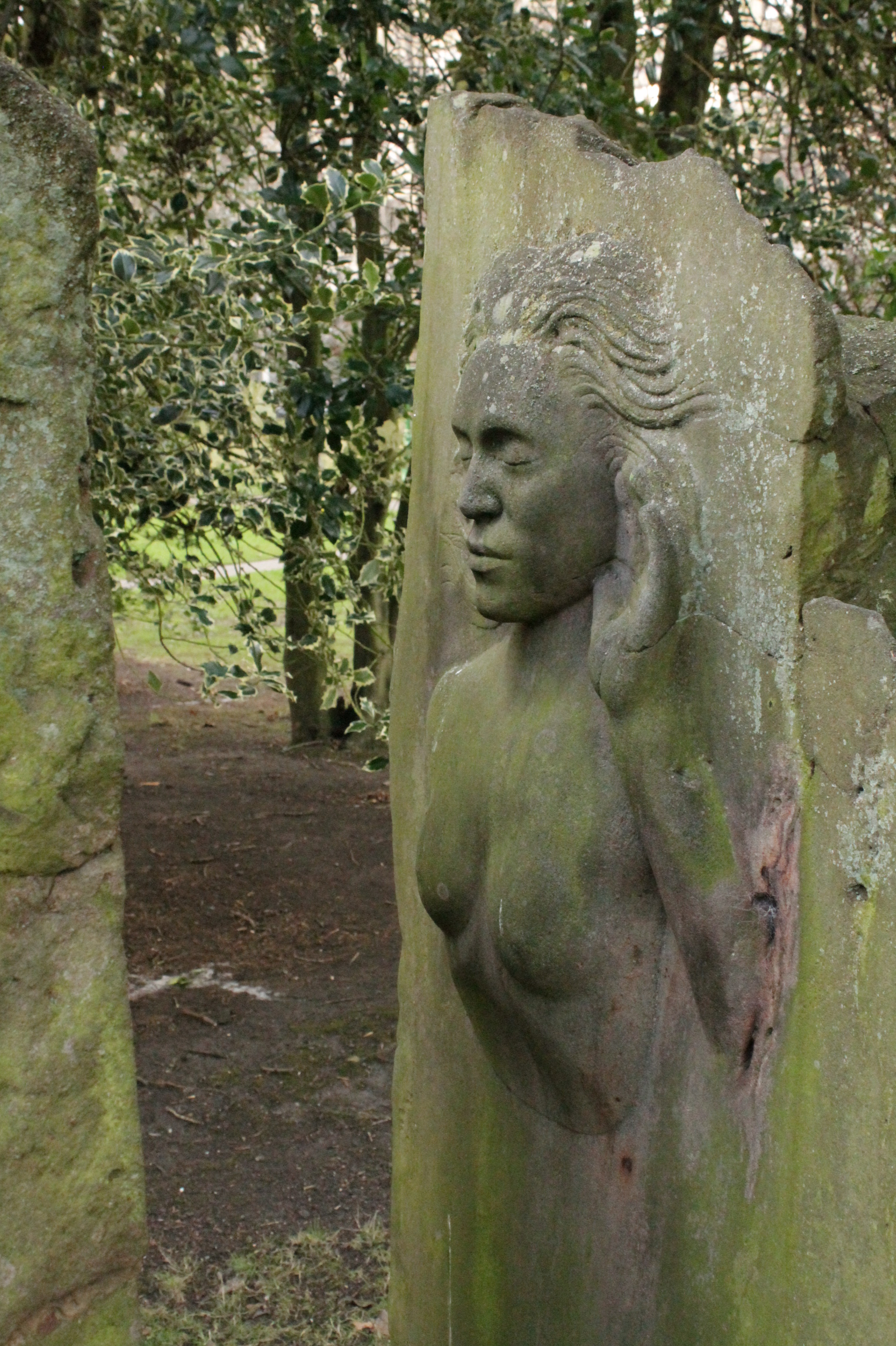
The Dreamer, memorial to Winifred Rushforth in George Square, Edinburgh

Sir Laurens van der Post attended Dr Rushforth's Memorial Service in Old St Paul's Church, Edinburgh, as Prince Charles's representative. The service was conducted by the then Bishop of Edinburgh, Richard Holloway. Father Jock Dalrymple gave the eulogy.

A 1982 portrait of Rushforth by the artist Victoria Crowe is held in the collection of the Scottish National Portrait Gallery. In 2002, a memorial sculpture in Edinburgh's George Square Gardens, "The Dreamer", by the sculptor Christopher Hall was dedicated by Prince Charles.

== Awards and honours ==
- 1968, OBE

== Selected works ==
- Something is Happening: Spiritual Analysis and Depth Psychology in the New Age (Turnstone Press, 1981)
- Ten Decades of Happenings (Gateway Books, 1984) (autobiography)
- Life's Currency: Time, Money and Energy : An Anthology of Shorter Writings (Atrium, 1986)
