= McKell =

McKell is a surname. Notable people with the surname include:

- Iain McKell, English photographer
- Michael McKell (born 1959), English actor and singer/songwriter
- Mike McKell, American lawyer and politician
- William McKell GCMG (1891–1985), Australian politician, Premier of New South Wales from 1941 to 1947, 12th Governor-General of Australia

== See also ==
- Electoral district of McKell, electoral district of the Legislative Assembly in the Australian state of New South Wales, created in 1988
