= Poth (disambiguation) =

Poth may refer to:

- Poth, Texas, United States, a city
- Brian Poth (born 1975), American actor
- Diána Póth (born 1981), Hungarian figure skater
- Frederick A. Poth Houses, historic houses in Philadelphia, United States
- Poth and Schmidt Development Houses, historic houses in Philadelphia, United States
- Poor. Old. Tired. Horse., British poetry magazine, 1960s
