= John Maltby =

English sculptor and potter (1936–2020)

- Born: 15 July 1936; Cleethorpes
- Died: 22 December 2020 (aged 84)
- Education: Leicester College of Art and Goldsmith's College
- Occupations: Artist, potter and sculptor
- Years active: 1962–2020
- Known for: Pottery, Sculptor
- Spouse: Heather Helmore
- Children: Joe and Philippa

John Maltby (15 July 1936 – 22 December 2020) was a distinguished English sculptor and studio potter. He was apprenticed to David Leach for two years before setting up his own pottery near Crediton in Devon. After surgery in 1996 left him too weak to make pots, Maltby began to create small ceramic sculptures.

== Education and career ==
John Maltby was born and brought up in Cleethorpes in Lincolnshire, where he attended Clee Grammar School. His father, a fish merchant, wanted Maltby to go into the same trade, but he was uninterested in doing so. After leaving school he went on study for a degree at Leicester College of Art specialising in sculpture and then Goldsmiths College in south London.

After a period of teaching art at a small private boys' school at Caterham in Surrey near London, he visited Bernard Leach after reading Leach's A Potter's Book. On Leach's advice Maltby joined his son David Leach in 1962 at Lowerdown Pottery in Bovey Tracey, Devon where he was Leach's apprentice for nearly two years. He then set up his own pottery at Stoneshill near Crediton in 1964. From the late 1980s until 2011, he taught a week-long ceramic course at Aberystwyth University. He also lectured at Cumbria College of Art and Design, and was a visiting tutor at West Surrey College of Art and Design.

After surgery in 1996 left Maltby too weak to make his pots, he began to make small ceramic sculptures of figures such as angels, birds, and fish. As well as ceramics, Maltby painted on wooden boards – especially depicting boats, inspired by his own love of sailing and the works of Alfred Wallis – and made painted wooded automata.

Maltby was a member of the Kenn Group of Artists (along with Clifford Fishwick, Michael Mason, William Ruscoe, Amy Elton, Frank Middleditch, Rowland Hill, Peter Thursby and others) and exhibited in the group's annual shows regularly, often in Exeter College of Art and Design or the gallery of the Royal Albert Memorial Museum in the city, but also further afield. He was also a member of the Craft Potters Association and the British Crafts Centre, and an advisor to the Leach Archive.

His work has been exhibited worldwide and is represented in many public collections including the Victoria and Albert Museum. Maltby's life and work was celebrated in a retrospective exhibition and accompanying book in the summer of 2022 at the Yew Tree Gallery in Morvah, Cornwall.

== Style ==
His early pieces were in the Leach Anglo-Japanese style. It was after he set up his own pottery his individual style developed. From an early age he loved the sea and this remained an influence throughout his career as were his European travels and abstract artists. Following a major heart operation in 1996 Maltby was unable to undertake the work of kneading clay and manipulating large pieces, this lead him to start making smaller more sculptural works.

== Personal life ==
Maltby's parents were John a fish merchant and his wife Gladys. Whilst at Caterham he met Heather Helmore who was working as the school matron and they married in 1962. They had two children Joe and Philippa. Heather died in 2007 and John in 2020. He was still working in his pottery until shortly before his death.
