= Henry John Lintott =

Henry John Lintott (1877– 21 October 1965) was a British artist and teacher. Over the course of a long career at the Edinburgh College of Art, he influenced many leading 20th-century Scottish artists, including Anne Redpath.

== Life ==
Henry John Lintott was born in Brighton in 1877. He trained at the local School of Art, before studying in London and Paris. He moved to Edinburgh in 1902, becoming one of the first staff members at the Edinburgh College of Art. He taught there for more than 40 years, influencing many students, including Anne Redpath, John Maxwell, and William MacTaggart.

The National Galleries of Scotland describe Lintott as "a painter of portraits, landscapes and allegorical subjects", whose method was "slow and meticulous" and his style "often soft and dream-like". He was best known for large canvases of women, as well as landscapes.

In 1916, Lintott was elected an Associate of the Royal Scottish Academy, and later made a full member. He exhibited regularly, including at the Royal Scottish Academy in Edinburgh and the Royal Academy in London. He was also a member of The Society of Eight, a fixed membership group of likeminded artists.

His son, Henry Lintott (1908–1995) was the British High Commissioner in Canada.

On Lintott's death in Edinburgh in 1965, the Royal Scottish Academy mourned the loss of its oldest member, and "a very distinguished artist". They wrote:

Henry Lintott was an artist of real distinction, and his portraits were outstanding, scorning the fashionable formulas of the moment, and for that reason perhaps not always winning the recognition they deserved.

In 1967, the RSA held a memorial exhibition for Lintott, with a catalogue by Cordelia Oliver.
