= Marek Laczynski =

Polish printmaker, illustrator, and teacher (1925–2021)

Marek Laczynski (1925 – 23 November 2021) was a printmaker, illustrator and teacher, born in Warsaw Poland. Laczynski was a member of the Polish Home Army in 1941 and was involved in the Warsaw Uprising. From 1949 to 1952 he studied book illustration at the Borough Polytechnic and then lithography at the Central School of Art and Design from 1962 to 1964. He was a founding member of the Printmakers Council in 1965. He taught printmaking at Exeter College of Art and Design from 1964 until 1985, when he moved to Austria.

His work is held in the V&A, the University of Exeter, Aberystwyth University School of Art Museum and Gallery and London University. The British Museum holds nine of his woodcuts.

== Bibliography ==
- The Wizard and His Pupil - a Polish Fairy Tale 1972 Bartholomew Press, Exeter
- Faces of Fear 1973 Exeter College of Art and Design
