= Shashi Caan =

American design futurist

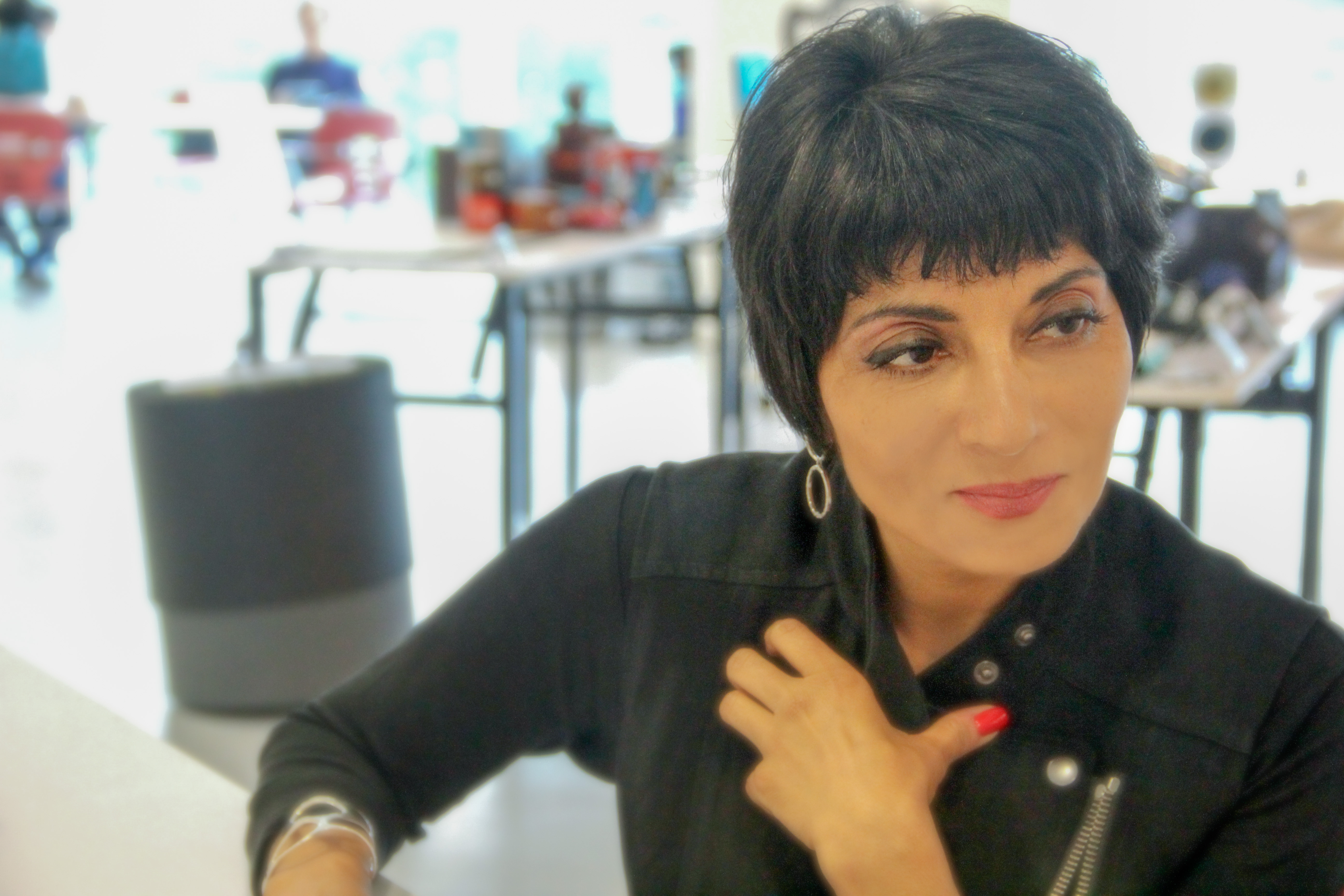
Shashi Caan

Shashi Caan is an architect, product designer, educator and author. Her work encompasses architectural interiors, product design, research into color and spatial experience, and design education. She studied at Edinburgh College of Art and holds master's degrees in industrial design and architecture from Pratt Institute. The Glass House conversation described her approach as bridging practice, theory and education, while integrating social and environmental stewardship into design.

== Design practice ==
Caan worked at Swanke Hayden Connell, Gensler and Skidmore, Owings & Merrill (SOM), where she served as design director and associate partner. In 2002 she established the Shashi Caan Collective, a multidisciplinary design practice.

Her product designs include the Translations carpet collection for Karastan Contract, which translated architectural materials and structures into woven patterns and textures. Her later Sensory collection for the same manufacturer drew on research into touch and tactile communication. She also contributed to the team that designed Collaborative Voice, the first collection of MetaFloor flooring, which received a Best of NeoCon award.

Caan designed E-motion, an illuminated sculpture at the Carnegie Science Center in Pittsburgh, with lighting designer Matthew Tanteri. Installed in 2000, the sculpture functions as a weather beacon, using colored light to indicate forecast conditions.

== Research, writing and education ==
In 1997, Caan curated Virtual Color: Light, Hue, and Form Integrated at the New York School of Interior Design. The exhibition and its accompanying catalogue explored colour in architecture.

With colleagues at the Collective, Caan developed Spatial Color, a live experimental installation examining color and human behavior. In a 2013 interview, she described three equally sized rooms in red, blue and yellow, with controlled lighting, in which the team observed visitors' movement, time spent and consumption of food and drink. She described the experiment as an investigation of assumptions about color and its relationship to design and practice.

Caan became chair of the Interior Design program at Parsons School of Design in 2002. In a 2005 interview with Metropolis, she described an approach to education that integrated knowledge from other disciplines while developing interior design's own body of knowledge. She has also taught at Pratt Institute.

Her book Rethinking Design and Interiors: Human Beings in the Built Environment, was published by Laurence King in 2011. An Architectural Record review highlighted its argument for grounding formal and aesthetic design decisions in empirical knowledge of human needs and behavior. The book examines interior environments and human well-being, drawing on psychology, experiential learning and design education.

== International leadership and educational initiatives ==
Caan served as president of the International Federation of Interior Architects/Designers (IFI) from 2009 to 2014 and was appointed its chief executive officer in November 2017.

Caan became IFI President-Elect in 2007. In preparation for IFI's fiftieth anniversary in 2013, she conceived and orchestrated the development of the IFI Interiors Declaration. Completed in 2011, it drew on four international surveys, dedicated workshops and concluding symposium in New York, incorporating input from 88 countries. Its subsequent adoption program invites city and national governments to affirm its principles. IFI reports adoption by 127 cities and nations.

Caan founded Globally We Design (GloWD), also known as GloW-DESIGN, an initiative examining design education and its relationship to practice. Its ReDesignEd Educators Forum in Singapore developed the Universal Design Education Charter, released in 2018, addressing technology, sustainability, knowledge and professional responsibility.

A subsequent ReDesignEd forum at the National Autonomous University of Mexico (UNAM) in April 2023 produced the Mexico City Manifesto. The Royal College of Art's research repository describes the document as incorporating contributions from more than 50 design educators and practitioners from five continents.

GloWD also operated the Global Experimental Live-Lab (GEL-Lab), a digital design studio exploring collaborative approaches to design education across disciplines, institutions and countries. A 2023 event listing published by ArchDaily described the program as comprising 400 students and 40 faculty from 40 countries. GloWD's account of its 2020 studio documents participation across five continents.

== Recognition ==
Caan was named Designer of the Year by Contract magazine in 2004 and Educator of the Year by IFMA Greater New York in 2006. In 2010, the New York School of Interior Design awarded her an honorary Doctor of Fine Arts degree. She served as a juror for Singapore's President's Design Award in 2013.

She is a Fellow of IFI and Royal Society of Arts, and an honorary fellow of the American Society of Interior Designers, the British Institute of Interior Design and the Design Institute of Australia. An AIA Las Vegas newsletter records her CIDI fellowship designation, FCIDI.
