= Edinburgh School of Architecture and Landscape Architecture =

Architecture school of Edinburgh College of Art

- Type: Public
- Established: 1907
- Affiliations: Edinburgh College of Art University of Edinburgh (2004-present) Heriot-Watt University (1968-2004)
- Location: Edinburgh, Scotland; 55°56′43″N 3°11′54″W
- Campus: Lauriston Place and Chambers Street
- Website: eca.ed.ac.uk
- Location in Scotland

The Edinburgh School of Architecture and Landscape Architecture (ESALA) is part of Edinburgh College of Art at the University of Edinburgh in Scotland. The school was ranked 5th in the UK in the 2013 Guardian University Guide and 4th in the Complete University Guide, for architecture. In 2016 Edinburgh ranked 3rd in the country for Architecture according to the Complete University Guide.

== History ==
In 1907, Edinburgh College of Art was established under the control of the Scottish Education Department, following the approval of a major reorganisation of Edinburgh’s higher art education. At the time, Edinburgh College of Art was divided into four schools: Drawing and Painting, Design and Crafts, Architecture, and Sculpture. The establishment of the new School of Architecture was initially aimed for the training of architects and artists, which was supported by public subscriptions and foundations. The first architecture courses were taught in 1908, in which it experienced numerous changes in teaching staff, structure, syllabus, and its role in the education of architects, in the period from 1908 until 1968. The first Head of the School of Architecture within Edinburgh College of Art was John Watson, appointed in 1908. Meanwhile, The Forbes Chair of Architecture, which was a joint post with Edinburgh College of Art, was established in 1947, in which Raymond Gordon Brown was the holder of the title as well as the Head of School of Architecture within the University of Edinburgh. Between 1968 and 2004, Edinburgh College of Art enjoyed associate status and awarded degrees of Heriot-Watt University.

Since 2004, the University of Edinburgh became the accrediting body for Edinburgh College of Art, in which degrees and programmes obtained at Edinburgh College of Art had been validated by the University of Edinburgh. In 2009, the School of Architecture within the University of Edinburgh merged with Edinburgh College of Art's School of Architecture and Landscape Architecture to form the Edinburgh School of Architecture and Landscape Architecture (ESALA), and established academic federation between the two institutions. From 2009 to 2011, ESALA as a joint school was belonged to both Edinburgh College of Art and the University of Edinburgh's School of Arts, Culture, and Environments. In 2011, Edinburgh College of Art merged with the University of Edinburgh. As the result, Edinburgh College of Art has combined with the university's School of Art, Culture, and Environment to form a new enlarged Edinburgh College of Art within the University of Edinburgh's College of Humanities and Social Sciences.

== Curriculum ==
All professional programmes in architecture are accredited by the Royal Institute of British Architects (RIBA) and the Architects Registration Board (ARB). Professional programmes in landscape architecture are accredited by the Landscape Institute (LI).
