= Ian Hamilton Finlay =

Scottish poet, writer, artist and gardener (1925–2006)

- Finlay at Little Sparta, 1994
- Born: 28 October 1925; Nassau, Bahamas
- Died: 27 March 2006 (aged 80); Edinburgh, Scotland
- Known for: Poetry, concrete poetry, art, gardens, sculpture, publishing
- Notable work: Little Sparta with Sue Finlay; Sea Poppy I (with Alistair Cant); Starlit Waters; The Little Seamstress (with Richard Demarco); Tree-Shells (with Ian Gardner)

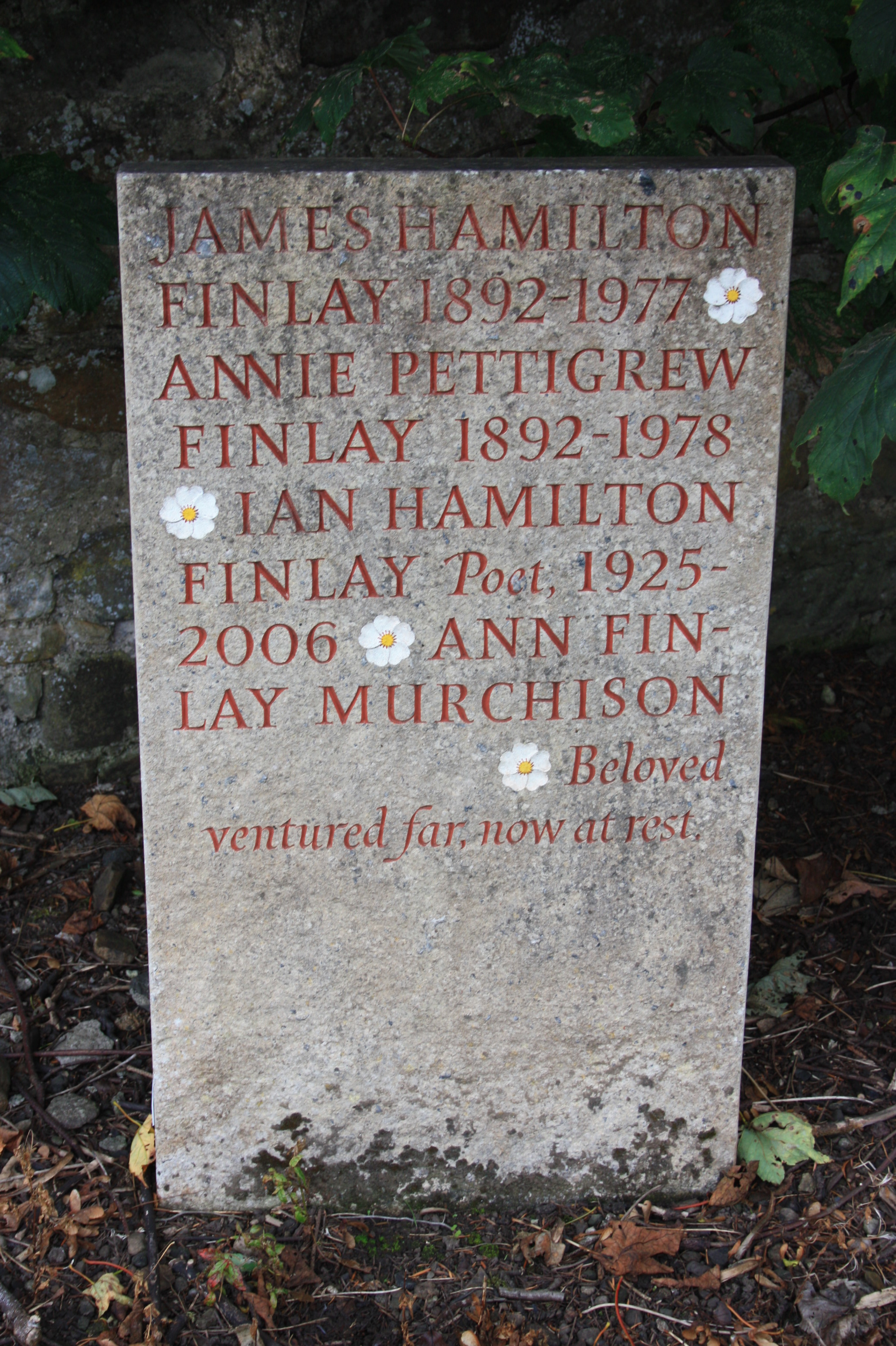
The grave of Ian Hamilton Finlay, Abercorn churchyard

Ian Hamilton Finlay CBE (28 October 1925 – 27 March 2006) was a Scottish poet, writer, artist and gardener.

== Life ==
Finlay was born in Nassau, Bahamas, to James Hamilton Finlay and his wife, Annie Pettigrew, both of Scots descent.

Finlay attended Dollar Academy in Clackmannanshire. At the age of 13, with the outbreak of the Second World War, he was evacuated to family in the countryside (firstly to Gartmore and then to Kirkcudbright).

Finlay attended Glasgow School of Art.

In 1942, Finlay joined the British Army. Throughout his life, Finlay suffered severely from agoraphobia.

Finlay was married twice and had two children, Alec and Ailie.

Finlay died in Edinburgh in 2006. He is buried alone in Abercorn Churchyard in West Lothian, Scotland. The grave lies in the extreme south-east corner of the churchyard. The gravestone refers to his parents and sister.

== Poetry ==
At the end of the war, Finlay worked as a shepherd. He then started to write short stories and poems, while living on Rousay, in Orkney.

In 1958, Finlay published his first book, The Sea Bed and Other Stories, with some of his plays broadcast on the BBC, and some stories featured in The Glasgow Herald.

In 1960, Finlay published his first collection of poetry, The Dancers Inherit the Party, with Migrant Press. A second edition was published in 1962; and the third edition, published by Fulcrum Press in 1969, included a number of new poems.

Dancers was included in its entirety in a New Directions annual a few years later.

In 1963, Finlay published Rapel, his first collection of concrete poetry (poetry in which the layout and typography of the words contributes to its overall effect), and it was as a concrete poet that he first gained wider acknowledgement and readership. Much of this work was issued through his own Wild Hawthorn Press, in his magazine Poor. Old. Tired. Horse. Finlay reduced the monostich form (single line poems) to one word with his concrete poems in the 1960s. Repetition, imitation and tradition lay at the heart of Hamilton's poetry, and exploring "the juxtaposition of apparently opposite ideas".

== Art ==
Finlay composed concrete poems to be inscribed into stone, incorporating these sculptures into the natural environment.

This kind of "poem-object" features in the garden Little Sparta that he and Sue Finlay created together in the Pentland Hills near Edinburgh from the mid-1960s. Whilst these sculptures were added to the garden Finlays understanding was that "the work would be the garden itself." The five-acre garden also includes more conventional sculptures and two garden temples.

In December 2004, in a poll conducted by Scotland on Sunday, a panel of fifty artists, gallery directors and arts professionals voted Little Sparta to be the most important work of Scottish art. Second and third were the Glasgow School of Art by Charles Rennie Mackintosh and The Skating Minister by Henry Raeburn. Sir Roy Strong has said of Little Sparta that it is "the only really original garden made in this country since 1945".

The Little Sparta Trust plans to preserve Little Sparta for the nation by raising enough to pay for an ongoing maintenance fund. Magnus Linklater (Chair), Neil Firth, Richard Ingleby (of Ingleby Gallery), Iain McFadden (Treasurer), Andrew Patrizio, Paul Stirton, Camilla Toulmin, Ann Uppington and Nicky Wilson are trustees. Former trustees include Ian Appleton, Stephen Bann, Stephen Blackmore, Patrick Eyres (of New Arcadian Press), John Leighton, Duncan Macmillan, Victoria Miro, Paul Nesbitt and Jessie Sheeler.

Hamilton Finlay and George Oliver's 1973 Arcadia screenprint uses camouflage in modern art to contrast leafy peace and military hardware. He continually revisited war themes and the concept of the Utopian Arcadia in his work.

Finlay's work is notable for a number of recurring themes: classical writering (especially Virgil); fishing and the sea; the French Revolution; a continual revisiting of World War II and the memento mori Latin phrase Et in Arcadia ego. His 1973 screenprint of a tank camouflaged in a leaf pattern, Arcadia, referring to the Utopian Arcadia of poetry and art (another recurring theme), is described by the Tate as drawing "an ironic parallel between this idea of a natural paradise and the camouflage patterns on a tank". In the 1982 exhibition The Third Reich Revisited, Nazi iconography featured on architectural drawings by Ian Appleton, with captions by Finlay which could be read as a sardonic critique of Scotland's arts establishment.

Finlay came into conflict with the Strathclyde Regional Council over his liability for rates on a byre in his garden, which the council insisted was being used as commercial premises. Finlay insisted that it was a garden temple. His propaganda campaign against the Council between 1982 and 1985 became known as the Little Spartan War.

Finlay's use of Nazi imagery led to an accusation of neo-Nazi sympathies and antisemitism which resulted in the loss of two commissions to mark the bicentenary of the French Revolution in 1989, The Belvedere of Thiais and Un Jardin Revolutionaire at Hôtel des Menus Plaisirs, Versailles. Finlay sued the Paris magazine Art Press which had made the accusations, and was awarded nominal damages of one franc. The stress of this situation brought about the separation between Finlay and his wife Sue.

One of the few gardens outside Scotland to permanently display his work is the Improvement Garden in Stockwood Discovery Centre, Luton, created in collaboration with Sue Finlay, Gary Hincks and Nicholas Sloan.

Finlay was nominated for the Turner Prize in 1985. He was awarded honorary doctorates from Aberdeen University in 1987, Heriot-Watt University in 1993 and the University of Glasgow in 2001, and an honorary and/or visiting professorship from the University of Dundee in 1999. The French Communist Party presented him with a bust of Saint-Just in 1991. He received the Scottish Horticultural Medal from the Royal Caledonian Horticultural Society in 2002, and the Scottish Arts Council Creative Scotland Award in 2003. Finlay was appointed a CBE in the Queen's 2002 New Year Honours.

Finlay's work has been seen as austere, but also at times witty, or even darkly whimsical.

He is represented by the Wild Hawthorn Press, the Archive of Ian Hamilton Finlay, which works closely with the Ingleby Gallery (Edinburgh) and the Victoria Miro Gallery (London) in the U.K.

== Collaborators ==
Finlay's designs were most often built by others. Finlay respected the expertise of sandblasters, engravers and printers he worked with, having approximately one hundred collaborators including Patrick Caulfield, Richard Demarco, Malcolm Fraser, Christopher Hall, Margot Sandeman. He also worked with a host of lettering artists including Michael Harvey and Nicholas Sloan and Vincent Butler.

== Printed works ==
- Wild Hawthorn Press
- Little Sparta Trust
- Ingleby Gallery
- National Galleries of Scotland
- Victoria Miro Gallery
- Tate
- UK Government Art Collection
- Art Gallery of New South Wales

== Sculptures and gardens ==
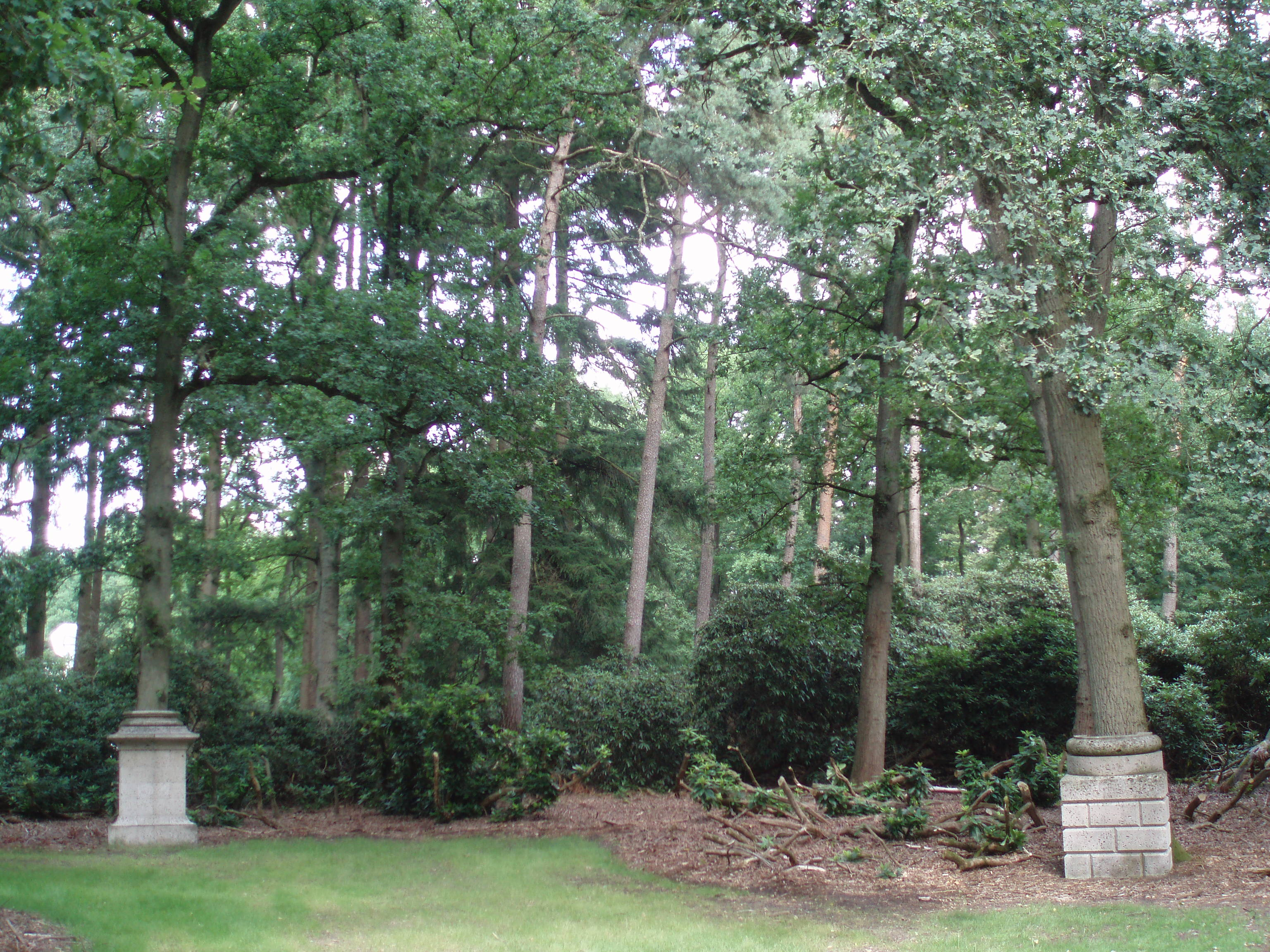
Five Columns by Finlay in the Kröller-Müller Museum

A partial list of Finlay sculptures and gardens. A few photographs are reachable through the external links.

- Little Sparta, (with Sue Finlay), Dunsyre, Lanarkshire, Scotland, 1966
- Canterbury sundial, Canterbury, England, University of Kent, near Rutherford College, 1972
- UNDA wall, Schiff, Windflower, Stuttgart, Germany, Max Planck Institute, 1975
- anteboreum, Yorkshire, England, private garden
- sundial, Liège, Belgium, University of Liège, 1976
- sundial, Bonn, Germany, British Embassy, 1979
- Five Columns for the Kröller-Müller, second title: A Fifth Column for the Kröller-Müller, third title: Corot – Saint-Just, tree-column bases named LYCURGUS, ROUSSEAU, ROBESPIERRE, MICHELET, COROT, Otterlo, the Netherlands, Rijksmuseum Kröller-Müller, 1982
- sundial, Cherrybank Gardens, Perth, 1984
- a basket of lemons, a plough of the Roman sort, two oval plaques, Pistoia, Italy, Villa Celle, 1984
- Vienna, Austria, Schweizergarten, 1985
- Brittany, France, Domain de Kerguehennec, 1986
- Eindhoven, the Netherlands, Van Abbemuseum, 1986
- A Remembrance of Annette, with Nicholas Sloan, Münster, Germany, Uberwasser Cemetery, 1987
- UNDA, with Sue Finlay and Nicholas Sloan, San Diego, Stuart Collection, 1987
- Furka Pass, Switzerland, 1987
- Strasbourg, France, Musée d'Art Moderne or Musée des Beaux-Arts, 1988
- Grove of Silence, Vincennes, with Sue Finlay and Nicholas Sloan, Forest of Dean, England, 1988
- Frechen-Bachem, Germany, Haus Bitz, 1988
- Preston, England, Harris Museum and Art Gallery, 1989
- Cologne, Germany, Ungers Private Library, 1990
- bridge columns, Broomielaw, Glasgow, Scotland, 1990
- Ovid wall, Aphrodite herm, tree-plaque, capital, with Nicholas Sloan, Luton, England, Stockwood Park, 1991
- tree-plaque, Hennef, Germany, private garden, 1991
- Lübeck, Germany, Overbeck-Gesellschaft, 1991
- Karlsruhe, Germany, Baden State Library, 1991
- Dudley, England, The Leasowes, 1992
- Six Milestones, The Hague-Zoetermeer, the Netherlands, 1992
- Paris, France, private garden, 1993
- Frankfurt/Main, Germany, Schröder Münchmeyer Hengst & Co, 1994
- stone bench, stone plinth, three plaques. pergola, tree-plaque, others, Grevenbroich, Germany, 1995, named: Ian-Hamilton-Finlay-Park 2014
- Foxgloves, with Peter Coates, Durham, UK, Botanic Gardens, 1996
- Shell Research Centre Thornton grounds, Finlay and Pia Simig with or for Latz+Partner, Chester, UK, 1997–
- paving, eight benches, tree plaque, with Peter Coates, Serpentine Gallery, Kensington Gardens, London, UK, 1997
- Fleur de l'Air, with Pia Simig, Peter Coates, Volkmar Herre, Harry Gilonis, John Dixon Hunt, Wild Hawthorn Press, Provence, France, 1997–2003
- Et In Arcadia Ego, with Peter Coates for Stroom, The Hague, the Netherlands, 1998 (see Fashion, art, society in Camouflage)
- The Present Order, with Peter Coates, for Barcelona City Council, supported by the British Council, Barcelona, Spain, Park Güell, 1999
- Petrarch in Island of Sculptures, Pontevedra, Galicia, 1999
- with Peter Coates, Hamburg, Germany, 1999
- benches, with Peter Coates, Erfurt, Germany, Erfurt Federal Labour Court, 1999
- Cythera, with Peter Coates, Lanarkshire, Scotland, Hamilton Palace grounds, 2000
- Six Definitions, Dean Gallery grounds, Edinburgh, Scotland, National Galleries of Scotland, 2001
- Ripple with Peter Coates, Luxembourg, Casino Luxembourg, 2001 or 2002
- with Peter Coates, Neanderthal, Germany, 2002
- with Peter Coates, Carrara, Italy, Carrara International Biennale, 2002
- Basel, Switzerland, with Peter Coates, 2003
- with Peter Coates, St. Gallan, Switzerland, private residence, 2004
- seven Idylls, Dean Gallery allotments, Edinburgh, Scotland, Dean Gallery Allotments Association, 2005
- L'Idylle des Cerises with Pia Maria Simig (with Peter Coates), Ingleby Gallery, Edinburgh, Scotland, preparatory drawings and sculpture, 2005

== Books ==
- Finlay, Ian Hamilton (September–October 2004). Ken Cockburn; Lilias Fraser (eds.). The Dancers Inherit the Party and Glasgow Beasts, An' a Burd. Polygon in association with Scottish Poetry Library. ISBN 1-904598-13-7. Original: 1960 Migrant Press, 1961 Wild Hawthorn Press, 1961 Wild Flounder Press, 1969 Fulcrum Press, 1995 or 1996 or 1997 Polygon ISBN 0-7486-6207-3.

== Bibliography ==
- Finlay, Ian Hamilton (September 2004). Ken Cockburn; Lilias Fraser (eds.). The Dancers Inherit the Party and Glasgow Beasts, An' a Burd. Polygon in association with Scottish Poetry Library. ISBN 1-904598-13-7. Original: 1960 Migrant Press, 1961 Wild Hawthorn Press, 1961 Wild Flounder Press, 1969 Fulcrum Press, 1995 or 1996 or 1997 Polygon ISBN 0-7486-6207-3
- Eyres, Patrick. "The Third Reich Revisited". Cencrastus. No. 10, Autumn 1982. pp. 23–27. ISSN 0264-0856.
- Plenel, Edwy (13 May 1989). "Querelle d'artistes sur fond de bicentenaire Les douteuses provocations de M. Finlay" (in French). Le Monde.
- Waite, Lorna J. (1989). "Sculptural Revolution"". The List. No. 97, 30 June - 13 July 1989. p. 12.
- Zdenek, Felix/ Simig, Pia (1995). Ian Hamilton Finlay: Works in Europe 1972–1995. Ostfildern.
- Finlay, Ian Hamilton (18 November 2006) [acquired 1989, completed 27 February 1997, revised March 2004]. "Ian Hamilton Finlay papers 1948–1992, Getty Research Institute, Research Library, Accession no. 890144".
- Hendry, Joy; Alec Finlay (February 1997). Wood Notes Wild: Essays on the Poetry and Art of Ian Hamilton Finlay. Polygon. ISBN 0-7486-6185-9. Original: 1994 Chapman Publishing ISBN 0-906772-61-3
- Finlay, Ian Hamilton (1995). Zdenek Felix; Pia Simig (eds.). Works in Europe 1972–1995 Werke in Europa. Werner Hannappel (photographer). Cantz Verlag. ISBN 3-89322-749-0.
- Gillanders, Robin; Alec Finlay; Ian Hamilton Finlay (18 May 1999). Little Sparta: Portrait of a Garden. National Galleries of Scotland. ISBN 0-903598-85-X.
- Weilacher, Udo (September 1999). "Poetry in Nature Unredeemed – Ian Hamilton Finlay" (interview) in Between Landscape Architecture and Land Art. John Dixon Hunt (Foreword). Birkhauser. ISBN 3-7643-6119-0.
- Rashwan, Nagy; Ian Hamilton Finlay (December 2001). "The Death of Piety: Ian Hamilton Finlay in conversation with Nagy Rashwan". Jacket (15). ISSN 1440-4737.
- Lubbock, Tom (August 2002). Susan Daniel-McElroy (ed.). Ian Hamilton Finlay: Maritime Works. Tate Gallery Publishing Ltd. ISBN 0-9539924-5-4.
- Tate St. Ives (2002). Ian Hamilton Finlay Maritime Works: Notes for Teachers (PDF). Archived from the original on 29 January 2006.
- Finlay, Ian Hamilton (September 2004). Pia Simig; John Dixon Hunt (eds.). Fleur de l'Air: A Garden in Provence by Ian Hamilton Finlay. Volkmar Herre (photographer). Wild Hawthorn Press. ISBN 0-9548192-1-7.
- Sheeler, Jessie (2003). Little Sparta, the Garden of Ian Hamilton Finlay. Andrew Lawson. Frances Lincoln. ISBN 0-7112-2085-9. Archived from the original on 5 February 2012.
- Finlay, Ian Hamilton (2006). "The Lilly Library, Indiana University".
- Finlay, Ian Hamilton (2006). "The National Archives of the UK (TNA): Public Record Office (PRO) GB/NNAF/P9981".
- Abrioux, Yves (15 December 2006). Ian Hamilton Finlay. A Visual Primer (N.e.of 2r.e. ed.). Reaktion Books. ISBN 0-948462-40-X. Original: 1992 MIT Press ISBN 9780262011297 or ISBN 0-262-01129-8

== See also ==
- Monostich
- Concrete poetry

== Sources ==
- Eyres, Patrick (1982), The Third Reich Revisited, in Hearn, Sheila G. (ed.), Cencrastus No. 10, Autumn 1982, pp. 23 – 27, ISSN 0264-0856
- University of Glasgow (September 2001). "Invitation to the Eleventh Jubilee Celebrations".
- BBC News (31 December 2001). "Honours for Scotland".
- Scottish Arts Council (2003). "Ian Hamilton Finlay CBE". Archived from the original on 8 October 2007.
- Cooke, Rachel (14 August 2005). "Gardener's word". The Observer. London: Guardian News and Media Limited.
- Craig, Cairns (2010). "Finlay, Ian Hamilton", in Oxford Dictionary of National Biography online, accessed 29 September 2016. (subscription required).
- University of Dundee (1 March 2006). "Duncan of Jordanstone Alumni Shine". Archived from the original on 29 September 2007.
- Hoyle, Ben (28 March 2006). "Ian Hamilton Finlay". Times Online. London: Times Newspapers Ltd. Archived from the original on 20 May 2008.
- Lubbock, Tom (29 March 2006). "Ian Hamilton Finlay". The Independent. London: Independent News and Media Limited. Archived from the original on 13 November 2006.
- Tate Britain (2006). "Turner Prize History". Archived from the original on 26 September 2006.
- Royal Caledonian Horticultural Society (2006). "Awards". Archived from the original on 29 December 2006.
