= Kitty Burns =

- Born: Katherine Burns; October 10, 1925; Edinburgh, Scotland
- Died: 2016 (aged 90–91)
- Other name: Katherine Burns McKeon
- Education: Edinburgh College of Art
- Occupation: Artist
- Relatives: Melanie Wilson (Granddaughter)

Kitty Burns (Katherine Burns McKeon; 10 October 1925 – 2016) was a Scottish artist, who worked in oil on canvas, and on mosaics and frescos. She spent many years in Hong Kong, where she became recognised as one of the region's leading artists.

== Personal life ==
Kitty Burns was born Katherine Balfour Kinnear Burns in Edinburgh, Scotland on 10 October 1925, the daughter of Joseph William Burns. She attended Trinity Academy, Edinburgh. Her father later told The Scotsman that Burns had been "painting since she was a toddler", and that the first mural she painted was in his shop at 38 Dundas Street, depicting "various facets of the fishing industry".

During World War II, she served with the Women's Royal Naval Service (W.R.N.S.), during which time she won the W.R.N.S. Art Competition. Afterwards, she studied drawing and painting at Edinburgh College of Art 1946–1950, where her teachers included William Gillies and Leonard Rosoman. She subsequently worked as an art teacher at John Knox's Academy, Haddington.

Burns married Leonard J. McKeon, an income tax official. In 1951, the couple moved from Edinburgh to East Africa. In 1962, the family moved to Aden, and later to Fiji. In 1972, they moved to Hong Kong, where they lived for 11 years. In 1983, they settled in France. They had two sons and a daughter.

Their daughter, Karen McKeon, also became an artist. Their granddaughter, Melanie Wilson, is a rower, who was a silver medallist at the 2016 Summer Olympics.

== Career ==
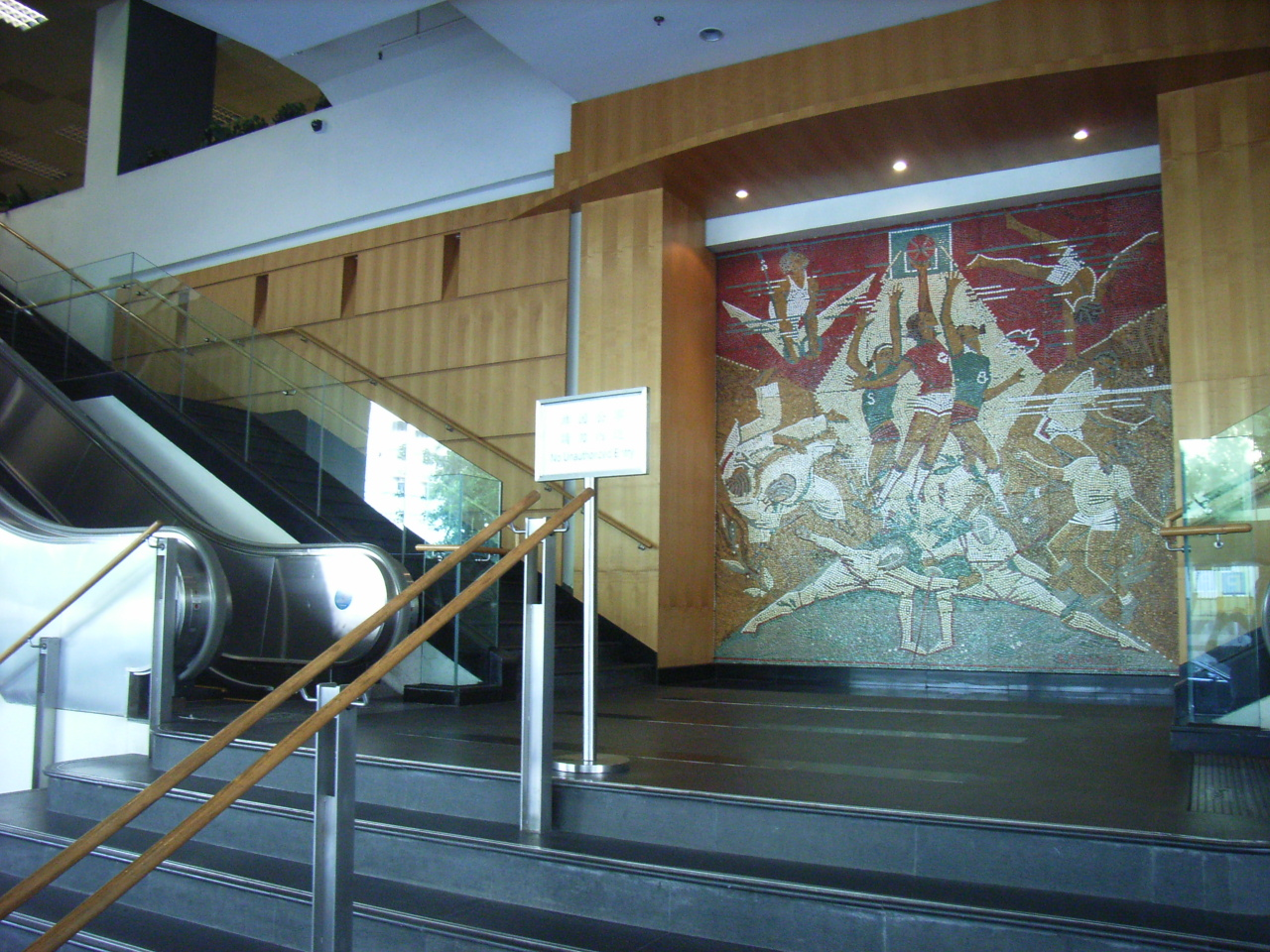
Mural by Kitty Burns, Queen Elizabeth Stadium, Hong Kong

Burns exhibited regularly, particularly in oils. She drew inspiration from a collection of sketches made over travels in Africa, Arabia, Fiji, and Hong Kong. Her work was exhibited in England, Scotland, East Africa, Aden, Fiji, Hong Kong, and Australia. She signed her work Kitty Burns.

In 1958, she completed two murals in the new High Court building in Dar es Salaam, depicting past and present administrators of the law in Tanzania. Three years earlier, in 1955, she has painted another mural for the Little Theatre in the same city. In 1961, The Scotsman reported that "despite running a home and looking after her two children she is reckoned to be one of East Africa's finest oil painters". That year, following her work's inclusion in the Sorsbie Gallery, Nairobi, she was described as "the most outstanding European artist" exhibiting.

In 1979, she was awarded the Hong Kong Urban Council painting prize. In 1981, a mural created by Burns using ceramic glazed tiles was unveiled at Hong Kong's Queen Elizabeth Stadium. She also produced a mural for Shanghai Bank in Paris.

The Hong Kong Museum of Art holds five of Burns' paintings in its permanent collection. The Imperial War Museum holds 'A Military Transport Type: Portrait of a Women's Royal Naval Service Driver' (1945).

In 1990, Burns won 1st prize at the St. Raphael International Exhibition.

In 1992, an exhibition of oil paintings by Kitty Burns and her daughter, Karen McKeon, was staged at Wattis Fine Art in Hong Kong, with both exhibiting in the Biennial at the Hong Kong Museum of Art.
