= Gwyneth Leech =

Gwyneth Leech is an American artist. She is best known for her use of paper coffee cups as a canvas for her artistic pieces and for her paintings of high-rise construction projects.

== Career ==
Leech began drawing on empty paper coffee cups during meetings in 2007 and became interested in creating on the curved cup surface and the endless supply of such a canvas. She first exhibited cups in 2011 as an installation in the NYC Fashion Center's Window Space for Public Art in the Garment District. Her physical presence while working in the window was a significant part of the project.

In the fall of 2011, the cup project transferred to the Flatiron Prow Artspace, 23rd Street and Broadway, in New York City. Leech was in residence working in public five days a week from September 2011 to February 2012, resulting in a final collection of 850 drawings and paintings on her used coffee cups. In 2012, "Drawings 1–655" were included in the "Luxuriant Refuse" exhibit at the Pearl Fincher Museum of Fine Art located in Spring, Texas. In September 2013, "365: A Year in Cups", a window installation for Anthropologie Regent Street, was featured in the London Design Festival.

Leech has since created site-specific installations for City Without Walls Gallery in Newark, New Jersey, and in NYC for No Longer Empty, Westbeth Gallery, Hewitt Gallery at Marymount Manhattan College and for the Susan Teller Gallery. Her largest cup installation so far has been "1001 Cup Stories", which was shown at the Harris Building in Grand Rapids, Michigan, for ArtPrize 2014 and was voted in the top 10 art installations.

Leech has explored different ideas about public drawing including drawing in public view, drawing with the public, and getting the public to draw, often in venues outside the traditional gallery and museum environment. She first drew in the public eye as part of Shiku Haku, a theater piece with Indalo Arts at La MaMa Theatre Club in 2000. In 2010, using the theme of family, she explored getting the public to draw in projects for the Pool Art Fair and for Figment's summer festival on Governor's Island in NYC.

In 2015, the construction of a 42-floor building began outside Leech’s studio window on West 39th Street in New York City. Instead of moving, she decided to create paintings of the process as the new building was constructed. Since then, Leech has been documenting skyscraping building projects including Hudson Yards, Billionaires' Row on West 57th Street, the new Museum of Modern Art tower on 53rd Street, and One Vanderbilt next to Grand Central Terminal.

Leech’s construction series is the subject of an award-winning short documentary by film-maker Angelo Guglielmo, The Monolith. Her construction site paintings have been showcased at Sciame headquarters in New York City (2016), in the Kaufman Arcade Space for Public Art in New York City (2018), at the Clinton/Hell’s Kitchen Studio Gallery in New York City (2019), and in gallery group shows in New Jersey and Massachusetts (2018).

Her prior projects include a series of alternative family portraits in oils called Perfect Families. It was first shown at Franklin 54 Gallery in New York City in October 2006 and traveled to the Southwest Minnesota State University Art Museum in January 2007. The paintings were then exhibited in a number of community venues in New York City including the Hudson Guild (2007), New York Public Library Columbus Branch (2009), First Presbyterian Church (2010) and at Stapeley in Germantown, a senior residence in Philadelphia (2010). A selection of the portraits was included in "All in the Family" at the Islip Art Museum, also in 2010.

== Awards and grants ==
Leech is the recipient of awards and grants including a Hell's Kitchen Foundation Grant, a Glasgow District Council's European Capital of Culture Project Grant, Scottish Arts Council Time Based Media Award, University of Colorado's President's Fund Grant, an Elizabeth Greenshields Memorial Award and a Thouron Fellowship. First artist-in-residence with Scottish Opera (1990).

== Background ==
Leech received a Bachelor of Arts from the University of Pennsylvania, Philadelphia, Pennsylvania, and a Bachelor of Fine Arts and Post Graduate DA from Edinburgh College of Art in Scotland.

She is the granddaughter of Pennsylvania artist and printmaker Michael J. Gallagher and a niece of the choreographer Martha Wittman.

Leech resides in New York City.
