= John Menzies (painter) =

Scottish painter (1871–1939)

John Menzies (1871–1939) was a Scottish painter of landscapes and portraits.

== Biography ==
He was born in Scotland at Old Machar, Aberdeen, in 1871. He lived in Wakefield and in the period 1880–1897 in 8 Jarratt street, Sculcoates, a suburb of Hull, working first as an art student teacher at Hull School of Art and Design in 2 Albion Street and then in drawing and composition at Edinburgh College of Art. He studied art in England where he became influenced by the Newlyn School of Impressionist painters as well as the late 19th century French painters. His wife Maria Menzies was also a successful landscape painter in watercolour and exhibited widely with her husband at Dudley Museum and Art Gallery, Royal Academy, Royal Institute of Painters in Water Colours, Royal Academy in London, Royal Glasgow Institute of the Fine Arts, Walker Art Gallery in Liverpool, Manchester Art Gallery and the Royal Scottish Academy in Edinburgh. He died in Edinburgh in 1939.

== Artwork ==
He was a painter in the traditional British Impressionist manner. He painted outdoors, en plein air, using quick and messy brush strokes trying to capture the atmosphere of a particular time of day or the effects of light in a landscape. He worked quickly with unmixed colours to achieve an effect of dynamism. All the elements painted are fused by the absence of drawing and intensity of vibrating colours. The final effect is a painting full of real sensations and life thanks to the two main protagonists: light and colour.

== Work ==
- Under the willow tree, 1900, oil on canvas
- Afton water, oil on canvas
- September Morning in the Hebrides, 1918, oil on canvas, Harris Museum, Art Gallery & Library
- Morag – Portrait of a young girl in a blue smocked dress, 1916, oil on canvas
- Portrait of Diana Pamela Galtrey Wallace nine years old with her pony, 1928, oil on canvas
- Loch Lomond – Night, oil on card
- On the river Kelvin, oil on board
