= Frances Walker (artist) =

Scottish printmaker (born 1930)

Frances Walker CBE RSA RSW
- Born: 19 August 1930 (age 95); Kirkcaldy
- Education: Edinburgh College of Art
- Known for: Printmaking

Frances Walker CBE RSA RSW (born 19 August 1930) is a Scottish painter, printmaker and retired lecturer.

Born in Kirkcaldy, she has lived in Aberdeen for more than 60 years. After teaching art in the Hebrides, Walker accepted a lecturer position in Drawing and Painting at Gray's School of Art, Aberdeen, where she also contributed to the foundation of Peacock Visual Arts print studio.

Walker's work takes inspiration from nature of the Western Isles and Antarctica, where she visited upon receiving the James McBey Travel Award from Aberdeen Art Gallery in 2007. She received the Churchill Award for art in 2014. Her technique includes screenprinting, lithography, monoprinting, etching, and collagraphy.
