= William Snell Morrish =

English landscape painter (1844–1917)

William Snell Morrish (March 1844 – 24 October 1917) was a prominent Victorian landscape painter, renowned for his depictions of Dartmoor.

== Early life and education ==
Morrish was born in Chagford, Devon, where his father, also named William, was a portrait painter and proprietor of a drapery and grocery store. Morrish's artistic talent extended to his children; his son Bertram and youngest daughter Maggie also painted Dartmoor landscapes, having received training from him.

Morrish studied at Exeter School of Art (later renamed Exeter College of Art and Design) and the Heatherley School of Fine Art in London. After his education, he returned to Chagford, where he began exhibiting watercolours in his early twenties. One of his early successes was "On the Moor Near Chagford," exhibited in 1866 and sold for fifteen guineas. Three years later, he sold "Sharpitor Rocks near Chagford" for twice that amount.

== Career and works ==
Morrish's primary subject matter was the moorland views near his hometown and along the River Teign. Around 1880, he traveled to Switzerland and painted several landscapes there. He regularly participated in exhibitions with other Devon artists and exhibited four times at the Royal Academy of Arts in London.

By 1881, Morrish's reputation was well-established. George Pycroft, in his book Art in Devonshire, noted, "He received some education at Heatherleigh's School in London, but his chief source of instruction was the work and conversation of the artists who in summer visited his picturesque neighbourhood. He paints with a bold, firm touch in the open air; his work is characterised by perfect fidelity and truthfulness, and he is an admirable delineator of Dartmoor scenery" (Art in Devonshire, 1881, p. 96).

Twenty years later, historian William Crossing wrote in the Western Morning News that "W.S. Morrish, a keen observer of Nature, possessing a full knowledge of the country he loves to paint, has given us some splendid pictures of the glorious heather which is its pride" (Western Morning News, August 1903).

Morrish is particularly noted for his atmospheric portrayals of the moor in all weather conditions, capturing its wide expanses of heather and gorse, tors, and rivers. His brief period in Switzerland likely enhanced his observational skills, which he applied to the landscapes around Chagford.

== Legacy ==
Morrish's works were highly regarded, and even John Ruskin is known to have purchased his paintings for his personal collection during visits to Devon. Morrish spent most of his life in Chagford, where he died in 1917, leaving behind a legacy of richly detailed and atmospheric landscapes of Dartmoor.
