= Paul Carter (artist) =

Scottish artist (1970–2006)

Paul Carter (4 March 1970 – 12 August 2006) was a Scottish artist known for his constructions. After his untimely death he was described in The Scotsman newspaper as "an important contemporary Scottish artist, and an inspiration both to his peers and his students."

Carter was born in Edinburgh, Scotland. In 1990 he graduated in Sculpture from Edinburgh College of Art with first-class honours. In 1994 he took part in the "Aerial Project" with other Edinburgh and Glasgow artists. He began teaching at the Edinburgh School of Art in 1997, subsequently also teaching at the Glasgow School of Art.

Carter's artworks included large installations and sculptures. He set out to demystify contemporary art, in his art practice and his teaching. His work was influenced by his varied interests in music, the 1960s countercultures, theology and physics. From 1998 music featured as part of his art. He exhibited his work across Europe, in Canada and Japan. According to his obituary by artist Robert Montgomery, he would "be remembered as an artist whose work opened up the sometimes narrow critical discourse of post-conceptual art in Scotland in the 1990s to questions of science, spirituality, politics and God."

Carter died in a car crash near Gosford House, East Lothian, on 12 August 2006 aged 36.

== Publications ==
ISBN 0-9552612-0-1The Embassy Gallery
