= Elizabeth Ogilvie =

Scottish environmental artist

- Born: 1946 (age 79–80); Montrose, Angus
- Education: Edinburgh College of Art
- Spouse: Robert Callender
- Website: http://www.elizabethogilvie.com/

Elizabeth Ogilvie (born 1946) is a Scottish environmental artist renowned for her work exploring the impact of climate change. Her work is held in several public and private collections and she exhibits internationally. Ogilvie is considered one of the most significant Scottish artists of her generation.

== Biography ==
Ogilvie was born near Montrose and grew up near the Cairngorms in Scotland. Ogilvie attended Edinburgh College of Art from 1964 to 1969, where she studied sculpture.

While initially focusing on sculpture, Ogilvie has spent much of her career creating drawings on paper. In the 2000s–early 2010s, she undertook research in Greenland, working with scientists and connecting with the local Inuit community; the resulting project was titled Out of Ice. More recent works are created across many mediums including water, music, light, architecture and video.

Ogilvie has lectured at the University of Edinburgh where she is an Honorary Senior Research Fellow. She uses her converted derelict cinema home and studio in Kinghorn to support early-career artists through her cultural trust, Lateral Lab.

In August 2018, the Black Dog Press published a book based on Ogilvie's Out of Ice project.

== Selected awards and commissions ==
Ogilvie has been the recipient of several awards and commissions, including the following,

- Ogilvie produced the 'Liquid Room' installation with a Creative Scotland Award, given by the Scottish Arts Council
- In 2015, Ogilvie was celebrated as part of the Saltire Society's Outstanding Women of Scotland Award
- Forth Valley Royal Hospital commissioned Ogilvie to create two digital artworks, titled 'Cloud Gate', with support from Artlink Central and the Baring Foundation’s Arts and Older People programme in 2018
- In 2018, Ogilvie won an international competition run by Culture Perth and Kinross to create the city’s largest public art project. The installation titled Meander was submitted jointly by Ogilvie and fellow Scottish artist, Rob Page and was unveiled by MSP John Swinney in November 2019.

== Selected exhibitions ==
- Summer Show 2, Serpentine Gallery, London, 8 August–6 September 1981
- A Poetics of Water, Stephen Lacey Gallery, London, 11–20 November 1999
- Liquid Room, Kirkcaldy, 30 June–15 September 2001
- Bodies of Water, Dundee Contemporary Arts, 16 December 2005 - 12 February 2006
- Elizabeth Ogilvie: Out of Ice, Ambika P3, London, 17 January–9 February 2014
- Out of Ice - The Secret Language of Ice, CASO Gallery, Osaka, 22 November–10 December 2014
- The Artist and the Sea, City Art Centre, Edinburgh, 26 September 2015 – 8 May 2016

== Works held in collections ==
Pieces by Elizabeth Ogilvie are held in several public collections, including the following works,

Title	Year	Medium	Gallery no.	Gallery	Location
Sea Journals (triptych, left wing)	1988	ink, acrylic & graphite on hand-made paper	CAC1988/52	City Art Centre	Edinburgh, Scotland
Sea Journals (triptych, centre panel)	1988	ink, acrylic & graphite on hand-made paper	CAC1988/52	City Art Centre	Edinburgh, Scotland
Sea Journals (triptych, right wing)	1988	ink, acrylic & graphite on hand-made paper	CAC1988/52	City Art Centre	Edinburgh, Scotland
Sea Paper	1987	graphite on handmade paper	GMA 3470	National Galleries Scotland	Edinburgh, Scotland
