= Queen Elizabeth Stadium =

Arena in Wan Chai, Hong Kong

Coordinates: 22°16′30″N 114°10′43″E

- Traditional Chinese: 伊利沙伯體育館
- Simplified Chinese: 伊利沙伯体育馆
Transcriptions
Standard Mandarin
- Hanyu Pinyin: Yīlìshābó Tǐyùguǎn
Yue: Cantonese
- Jyutping: ji1 lei6 saa1 baak3 tai2 juk6 gun2

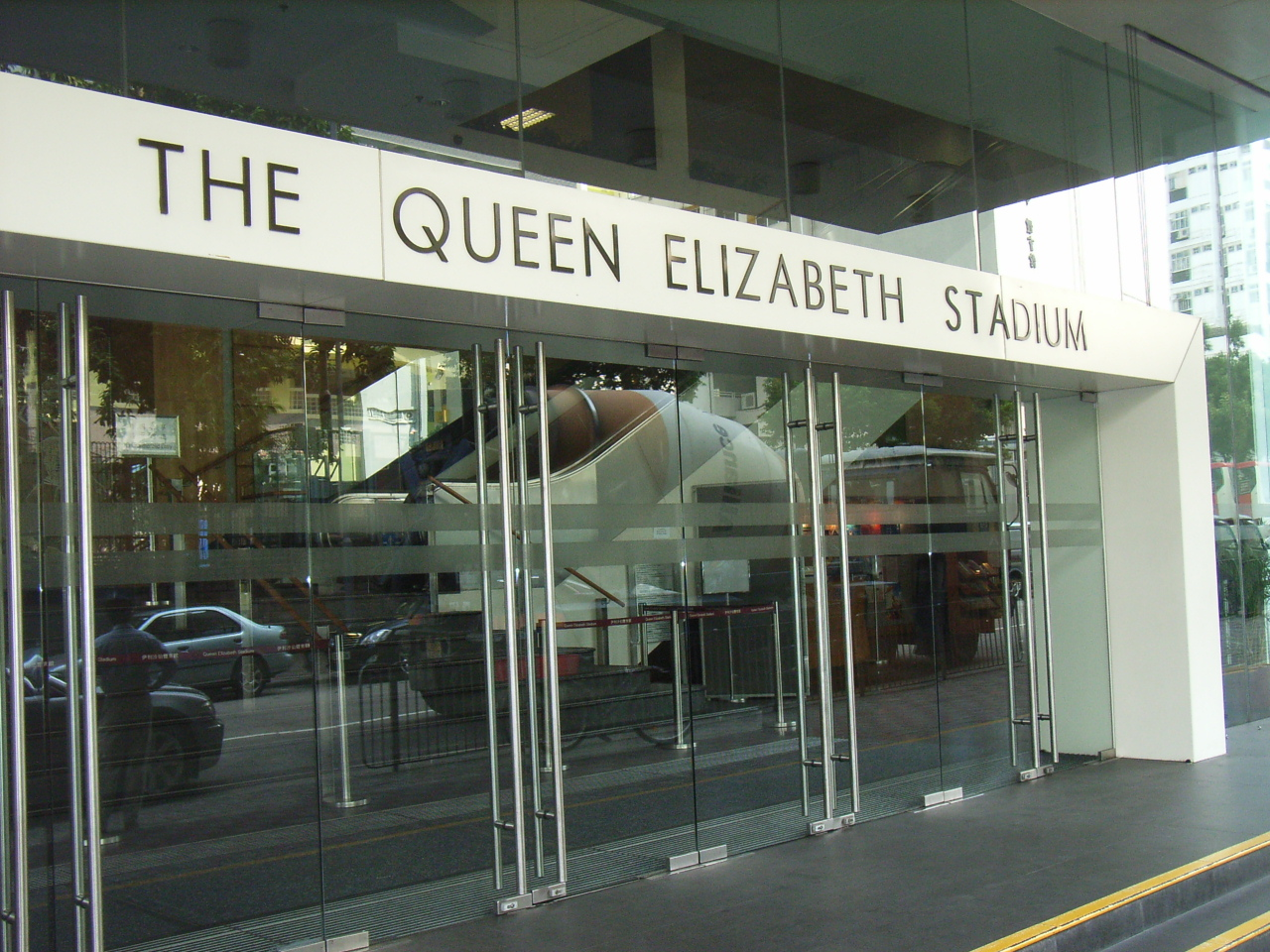
The Queen Elizabeth Stadium, no.18 Oi Kwan Road, Wan Chai, Hong Kong

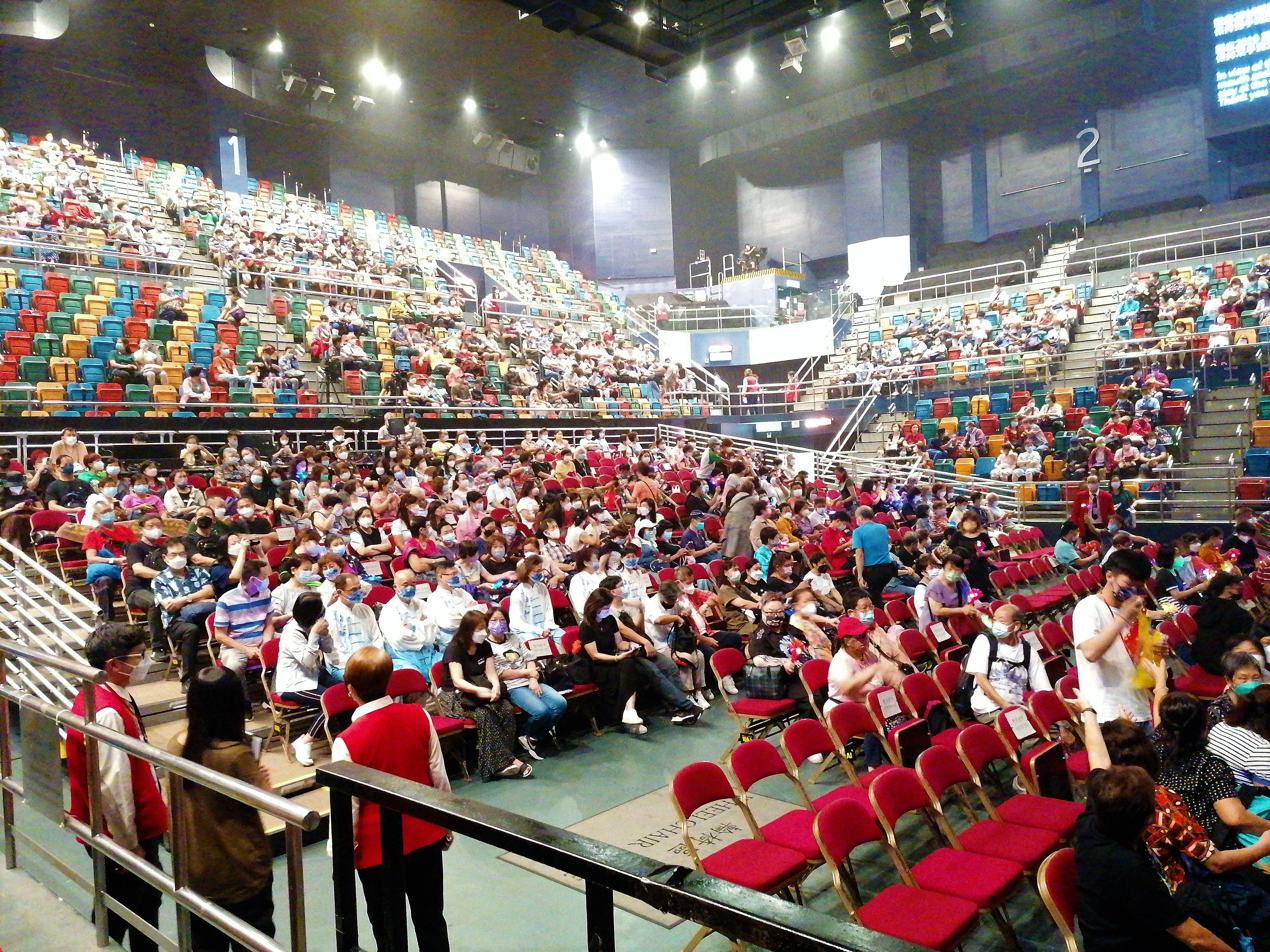
The arena in the Queen Elizabeth Stadium, Wan Chai, HK

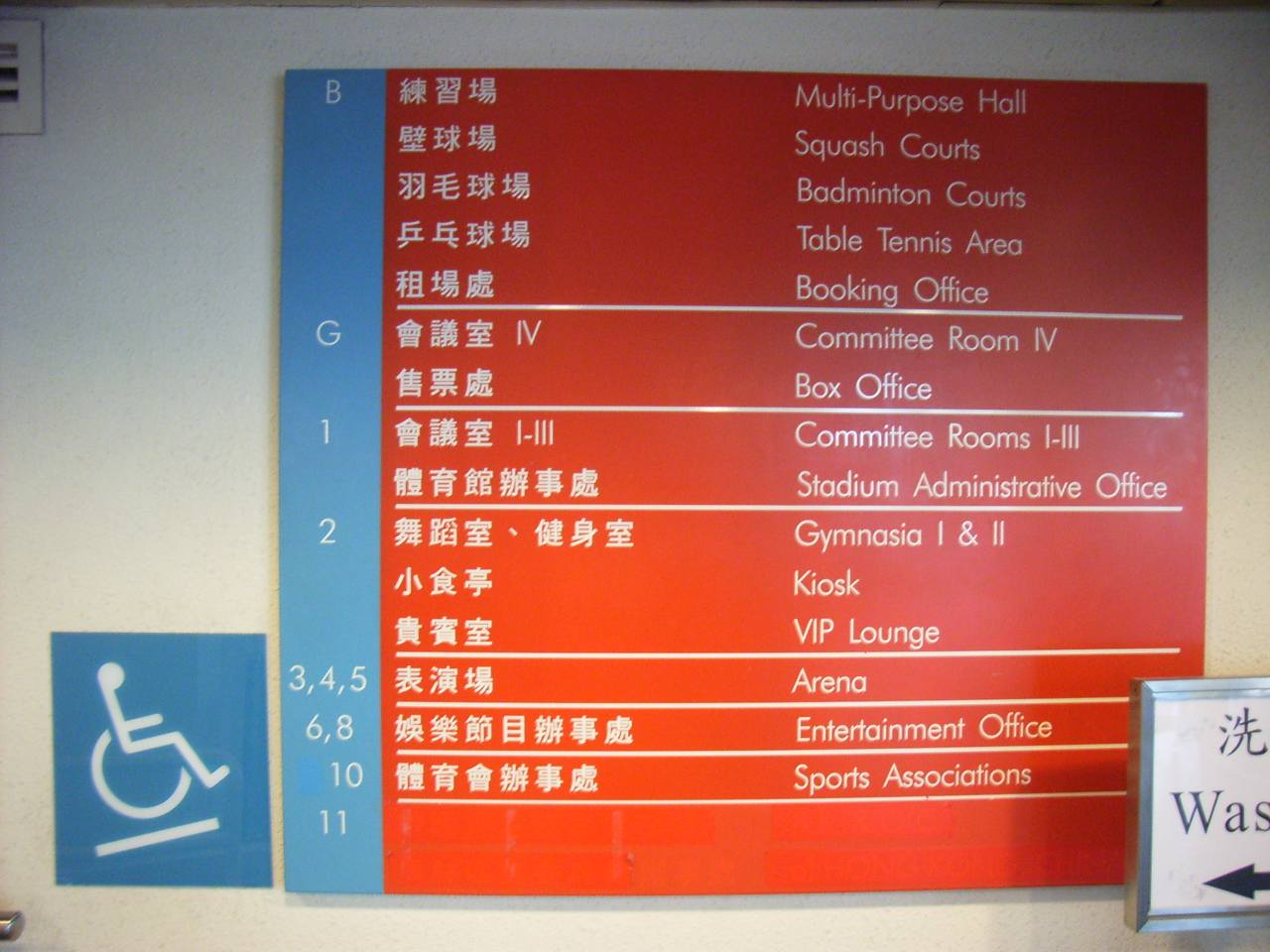
The occupation of the Queen Elizabeth Stadium, Wan Chai, HK

The Queen Elizabeth Stadium is an indoor sport facility on the Morrison Hill in Wan Chai, on the Hong Kong Island of Hong Kong. First opened in 1980, it has a 3,500-seat arena, gymnasia, squash and badminton courts, and a multi-purpose hall. It was built by the Urban Council, and is now managed by the Leisure and Cultural Services Department of the Hong Kong Government.

It hosted the official 1983 Asian Basketball Championship and the 2023 Gay Games.

== History ==
Queen Elizabeth II made her first visit to Hong Kong, then a British colony, in May 1975. This Royal Visit became the namesake of the stadium. The construction was funded by various means including donations from local philanthropists such as Sir Tang Shiu-kin, and the Royal Hong Kong Jockey Club.

The foundation stone was laid by the Acting Governor Sir Denys Roberts on 21 December 1977. The stadium was opened by the Governor Sir Murray MacLehose on 27 August 1980. In 1981, a mural by Scottish-born artist Kitty Burns was unveiled. The stadium has become one of the major venues for cultural and sports activities in Hong Kong.

== Popular culture ==
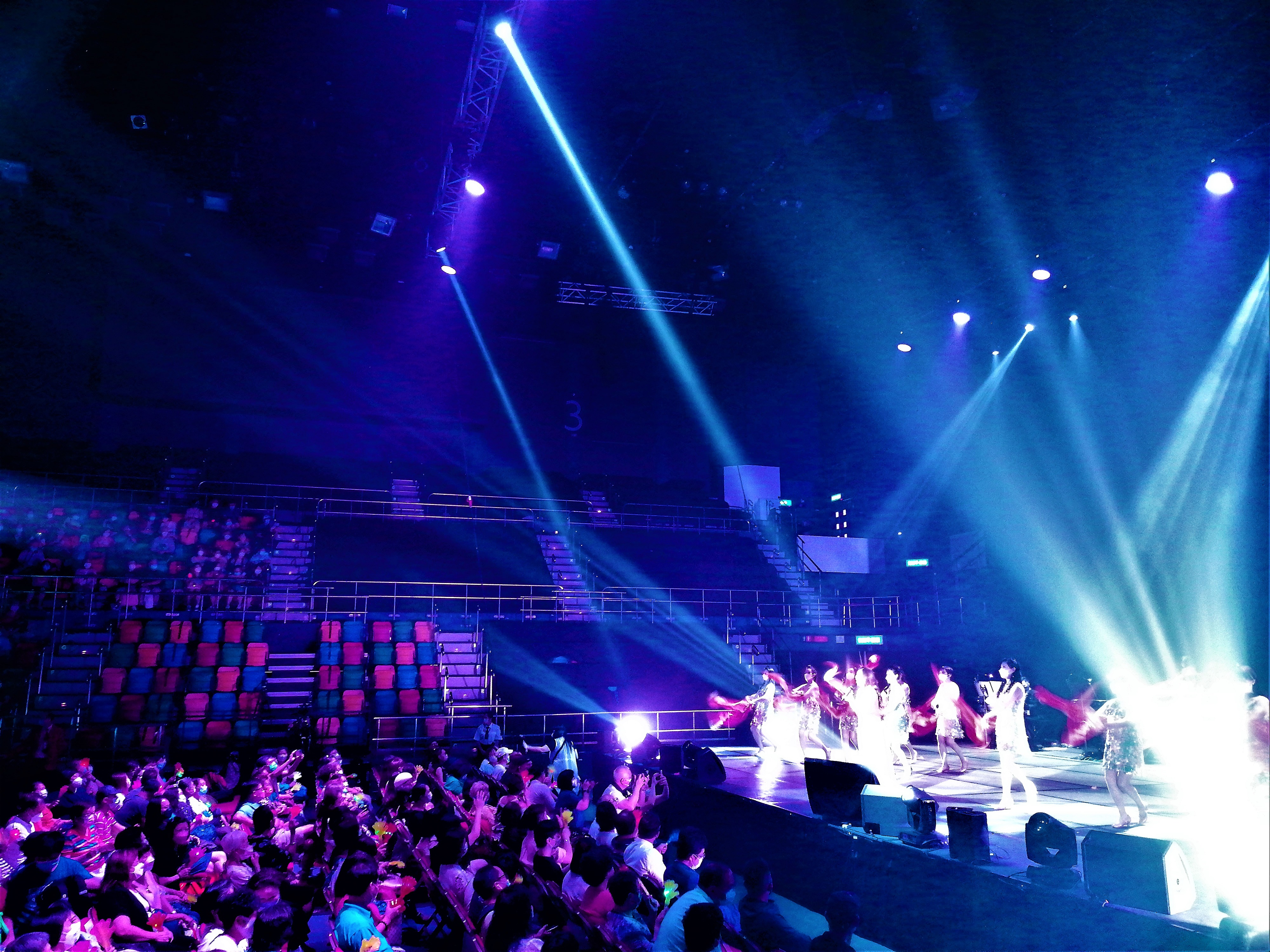
A concert held at Queen Elizabeth Stadium in 2022.

Japanese pop singer Kenji Sawada, widely popular across Asia at the time, was one of the first artists to use the stadium as a concert venue (December 1980, just four months after its opening), followed by Taiwanese pop singer Teresa Teng in 1982. Many successful home-grown artists and pop stars also held concerts at the venue including George Lam, Michael Kwan, Danny Chan, Alan Tam, Samuel Hui and Beyond (See 1970s and 1980s in Hong Kong). However, the stadium's status as the top concert venue in Hong Kong, or even Asia, was gradually eclipsed by the larger stadium Hong Kong Coliseum.

The stadium is also one of the major venues during the 2009 East Asian Games.
