= Heather Tweed =

Heather Tweed (born 1959) is a visual artist, educator and writer based in the UK whose artwork is exhibited nationally and internationally. Graduating from Exeter College of Art and Design in 1983, she first came to national attention with her Anubis Other World Tour series of exhibitions beginning in 1997.

She has had solo exhibitions in London, Edinburgh, Bristol, Bath, Birmingham, Yorkshire and Exeter and in many groups shows, and been selected for exhibition by the Saatchi Gallery.

In 2009 her Abscission series of installations took place during the Edinburgh Fringe Festival. In 2010 her Lost Not Found: Abscission was part of the official Edinburgh Art Festival.
