= Fanny Lam Christie =

Hong Kongese-Scottish sculptor

- Born: 1952 (age 73–74); Hong Kong
- Education: Edinburgh College of Art
- Website: https://www.fannychristie.com/

Fanny Lam Christie (born 1952) is a Hong Kong-born artist who specializes in sculpture and works in Scotland. She currently works from her studio in Perthshire, Scotland.

== Education ==
In 2004, Christie graduated with a Bachelor of Arts with Honours from the Edinburgh College of Art. She previously studied painting in Hong Kong in the 1970s, followed by studies in business administration and art education.

== Work ==
Christie's work often focuses on the human relationship with nature. University of Stirling, Perth & Kinross Council and the Scottish Sculpture Park hold works by Christie. She works mainly in bronze and clay, and undertakes private and public commissions as well as site-specific artworks. In 2014–2015, Christie undertook a residency at Stirling University's Institute of Aquaculture. As part of the Grassroots Public Art Grant programme run by West Lothian Council, Christie created a work in Armadale in 2010.

Christie is a member of several professional organisations including the Edinburgh Sculpture Workshop, Visual Arts Scotland, Perthshire Visual Arts Forum, Society of Scottish Artists and the Scottish Artists Union. She is also a member of the artist group, Heartwood Artists.

== Selected exhibitions and awards ==
- NS Macfarlane Charitable Trust award, 2005
- CUSP , Macrobert Arts Centre, 2–30 May 2015
- Reflections of the East art and event series, Stirling University, 20 September–23 December 2015
- Fanny Lam Christie, Birnam Arts & Conference Centre, 3–30 September 2016
- Arts Festival , Shankill Castle, County Kilkenny, Ireland, 9–19 August 2018
