= Henry Lintott =

British civil servant and diplomat

Sir Henry John Bevis Lintott, KCMG (23 September 1908 – 5 January 1995) was a British civil servant and diplomat. He was British High Commissioner to Canada from 1963 to 1968.

== Biography ==
The son of the painter Henry John Lintott, RSA, and Edith Lunn, Lintott was educated at Edinburgh Academy, Edinburgh University, and King’s College, Cambridge. He joined HM Customs and Excise in 1932, and was with the Board of Trade from 1935 to 1948. He was Deputy Secretary-General of the Organisation for European Economic Co-operation from 1948 to 1956, Deputy Under-Secretary of State at the Commonwealth Relations Office from 1956 to 1963, and British High Commissioner to Canada from 1963 to 1968.

Lintott was appointed CMG in 1948 and promoted to KCMG in 1957.

== Family ==
He married firstly in 1934 Phyllis Hamerton; their marriage was dissolved in 1948. He married secondly in 1949 Margaret Orpen; they had one son and one daughter.
