= Cherrybank Gardens =

Gardens in Perth, Scotland

- Location within Perth and Kinross
- Type: Garden
- Location: Perth, Scotland
- Coordinates: 56.3839190°N 3.4620694°W
- Area: 7 acres (2.8 ha)
- Established: 1984 (42 years ago)
- Closed: 2008 (18 years ago)

Cherrybank Gardens was a public garden in the southwestern outskirts of the Scottish city of Perth. Originally Bell's Cherrybank Gardens, when it was created in 1984 by Scotch whisky producers Bell's, whose headquarters were adjacent to the property, the gardens comprised 7 acres (2.8 ha). It included over 900 varieties of heather, the largest collection of its kind in the United Kingdom and known as the Bell's National Heather Collection. Its head gardener was Norman "Norrie" Robertson (1944–2015). Designed in the late 1970s, the gardens featured a sundial designed by Ian Hamilton Finlay.

In 2002, the gardens were gifted to Scotland's Garden Trust (SGT) by Diageo, the multi-national company created following the merger of Bell's owners, United Distillers (and their parent, drinks group Guinness), with International Distillers & Vintners (and their parent, hotel group Grand Metropolitan).

Two years later, in March 2004, the gardens announced its intention to develop an adjacent site into a £30 million National Garden for Scotland named The Calyx. In 2007, the project failed to gain the required lottery funding. The collapse of the Calyx scheme brought about the closure of the gardens in 2008, despite a petition by local residents.

In September 2008, six months after its closure, it was announced that the gardens were due to reopen, but it failed again. In 2012, the property was sold to an energy company.
