= Christopher Hall (sculptor) =

British sculptor (born 1942)

Christopher Hall is a British sculptor, born in 1942 in Nottingham, England, and now living in Scotland.

He attended Loughborough College of Art, as well as Edinburgh College of Art, where he studied sculpture under Eric Schilsky.

Some of Hall's major public works include:

- cloister carvings at Iona Abbey (1967–1997)
- gravestone of John Smith, Labour Party leader, Iona (1994)
- Eye of the Beholder (sandstone, 1998), Borders General Hospital, Melrose, Scotland
- The Dreamer (sandstone, 1998), memorial to Dr Winifred Rushforth at the University of Edinburgh, dedicated by Prince Charles in 2002
- Holy Trinity Carving (Doddington sandstone, 2000), Trinity Church, Embleton, Northumberland;
- Wildlife of the Tyne (Doddington sandstone, 2002), Tyne Court, Haddington, East Lothian
- The Fishers of Fisherrow (Doddington sandstone, 2002), Murdoch Green, Musselburgh, East Lothian
- stone boat at the late Ian Hamilton Finlay's garden, Little Sparta, in West Lothian
