= Elaine M. Goodwin =

British artist and author

Elaine M. Goodwin is a British artist and author. She has exhibited extensively, written several works on art and design, and was founder president of the British Association of Modern Mosaics (BAMM). Together with other prominent artists, Goodwin also co-founded Tessellated Expression for the 21st Century (TE-21), a group of professional artists dedicated to exhibitions of the tessellated art form.

== Education and art career ==
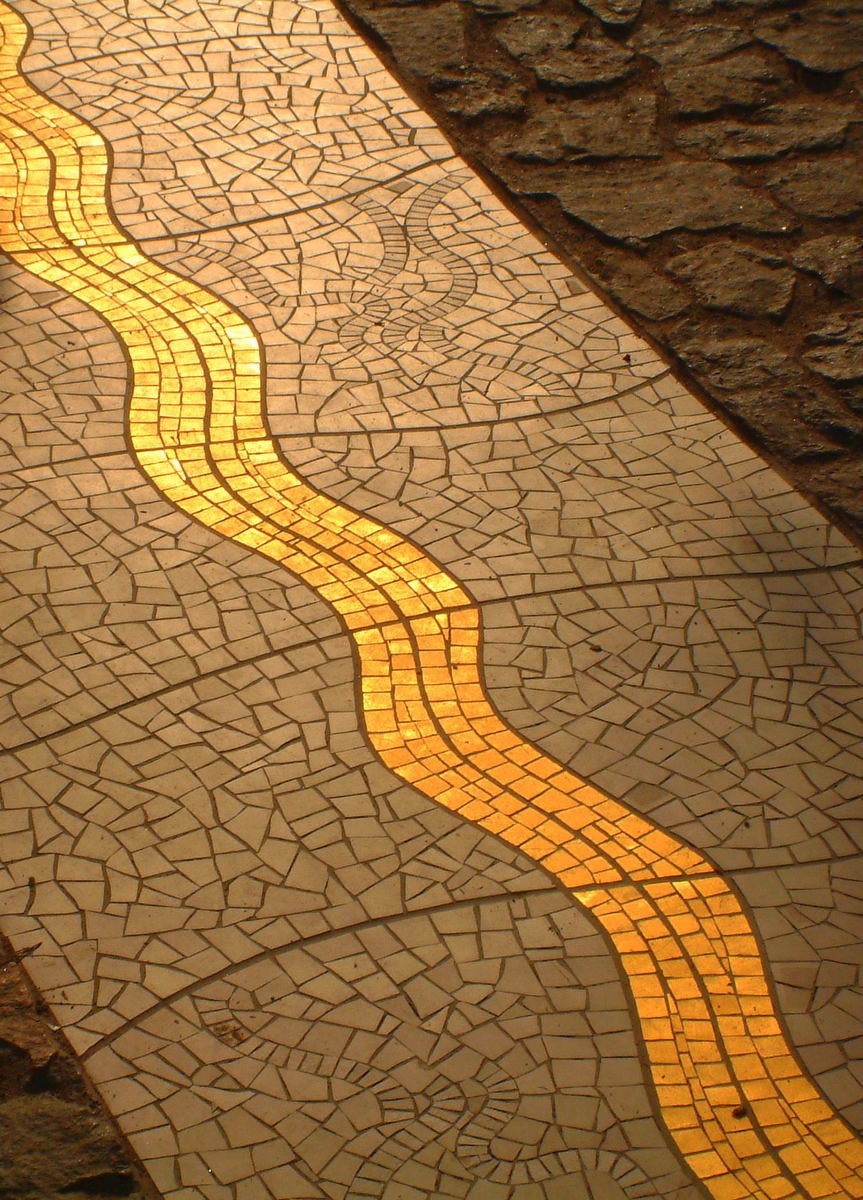
"Liquid Gold" mosaic at The Eden Project

Goodwin studied at the Exeter College of Art and Design, earning a bachelor's degree in Art. She subsequently gained international recognition with her artwork, and one of her first exhibitions, in 1991, was with the Barbican Centre in London. In subsequent years, Goodwin has exhibited her work around Europe, Japan, Egypt, and Morocco.

The majority of Goodwin's artworks are abstract pieces, using a combination of light-reflecting materials such as Venetian gold, smalti, and Carrara marble. Goodwin has stated that her art is "...about light...For all who look, at each and every moment, light is held, captured, and let go". With her extensive experience as an artist, Goodwin lectures and gives master classes, and has performed a curatorial role for the Royal Albert Memorial Museum in Exeter.

Goodwin has accepted many private and public commissions. One of these is a mosaic walkway and pyramid installation that she created for the Eden Project in Cornwall. The pyramid and walkway, which is in the Mediterranean biome, is titled "Liquid Gold" and displays Goodwin's signature use of shiny gold and silver materials.

=== Awards ===
Goodwin was awarded an honorary doctorate by the University of Exeter in July 2010. Goodwin is an elected member of the Chelsea Arts Club in London since 2016.

=== Forty year retrospective ===
The Royal Albert Memorial Museum and art gallery exhibited work by Goodwin in April 2019.

=== Publications ===
- Mosaic Today: Using New and Recycled Materials in Contemporary Mosaic published in 2008.
- Encyclopedia of Mosaics: Techniques, Materials and Designs
- The Human Form in Mosaic.<
- Mosaic: Finding Your Own Voice, Blurb, USA; 2008. ISBN 978-90-812669-4-9

=== BAMM and TE-21 ===
The British Association for Modern Mosaics, otherwise known as BAMM, was formed in 1999. It serves to promote mosaic art and publishes a regular newsletter, organises events and viewings, and helps artists network, among many other activities. An original member and elected president, Goodwin helped to form the association with several other artistic professionals.

Confronted with the challenges of having mosaic art internationally accepted as a modern, expressive, and saleable medium, Goodwin created TE-21 in 2008, along with fellow artists Lucio Orsoni from Italy, Toyoharu Kii from Japan, and Dugald MacInnes from Scotland. TE-21 is a group of professional mosaicists, exhibiting together around the world, and thereby helping to establish this artistic medium in national galleries and collections. The name, Tessellated Expression for the 21st Century, deliberately avoids the word "mosaic", due to its common associations with classic and utilitarian design.
