= Clifford Fishwick =

English painter (1923–1997)

Clifford Fishwick (21 June 1923 in Accrington, Lancashire – 22 January 1997 in Exeter) was a painter and Principal of Exeter College of Art and Design who exhibited regularly with the Newlyn and Penwith Societies. Fishwick is regarded as an important if underrated figure in post-war British painting.

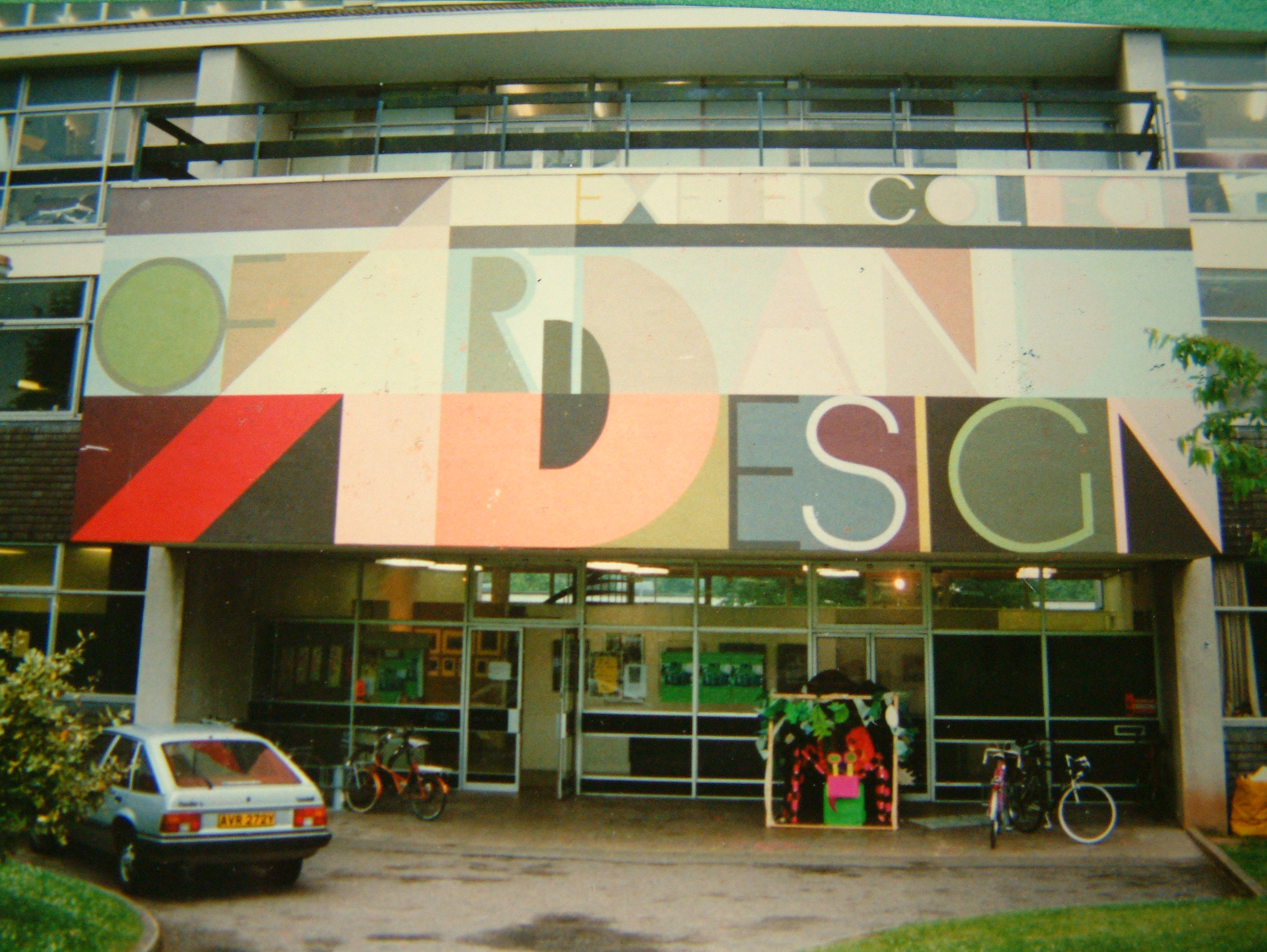
Exeter college of art

Fishwick attended the Liverpool School of Art. He began teaching at Exeter College of Art and Design in 1947 and was principal from 1958 to 1984. He was a member of the Kenn Group of Artists (along with Michael Mason - a former student of his, William Ruscoe, John Maltby, Amy Elton, Frank Middleditch, Rowland Hill, Peter Thursby and others) and exhibited in the group's annual shows regularly, often in the gallery of the Royal Albert Memorial Museum, but also further afield.

Fishwick had a close association with Peter Lanyon and was a member of the Newlyn Society of Artists from 1952 to 1983. Fishwick exhibited widely, including at the Royal Academy and the Penwith Society of Arts. Fishwick lived with his artist wife Patricia (b. 1929) in Topsham, Devon.

A painting titled At the Wheel of Boojum signed and dated 'Clifford Fishwick '56' was sold at Christie's in 2012 for £2000.

After his death, retrospective exhibitions were held in Exeter and Plymouth. His work is held at the British Museum in London, University of Plymouth, Plymouth City Museum and Art Gallery, Royal Albert Memorial Museum, Exeter, and University of Exeter.
