= William Kininmonth (architect) =

Scottish architect (1904–1988)

Sir William Hardie Kininmonth (8 November 1904 – 8 August 1988) was a Scottish architect whose work mixed a modern style with Scottish vernacular.

== Biography ==
Kininmonth was born in Forfar, Angus. He was educated at Dunfermline High School and later, George Watson's College in Edinburgh. His first architectural training was with William Thomson of Leith, where he was articled. From 1925 to 1929 he also attended classes at Edinburgh College of Art under John Begg, where he first met Basil Spence, then a fellow student.

With Spence, Kininmonth spent a year as an assistant in the office of Sir Edwin Lutyens in London, working on designs for the Viceroy's House in New Delhi, and attending evening classes at The Bartlett under Albert Richardson. Returning to Edinburgh, Kininmonth took a teaching post at Edinburgh College of Art, becoming a senior lecturer in 1939. In 1931, Kininmonth set up in practice with Basil Spence, working from a single room in the office of Rowand Anderson & Paul in Edinburgh. Kininmonth & Spence executed several commissions for private houses in Edinburgh, including the former's own modernist house at 46a Dick Place, The Grange (1933). In 1934 Kininmonth and Spence was merged with the Rowand Anderson practice, forming Rowand Anderson & Paul & Partners. When Arthur Balfour Paul died in 1938, Kininmonth and Spence became sole partners. In 1942 he was called up for military service, and served with the Royal Engineers in North Africa and Italy.

After the war, Basil Spence set up his own practice, while Kininmonth continued the renamed Rowand Anderson Kininmonth & Paul.

Kininmonth was knighted in the 1972 New Year Honours, and awarded an honorary degree by the University of Dundee in 1975. During his apprenticeship Kininmonth lived in a house of his own design: 46a Dick Place, The Grange, Edinburgh. He was married to the artist Caroline Kininmonth.

== Selected projects ==
Examples of Kininmonth's work in Edinburgh:

=== Kininmonth & Spence ===
- 46a Dick Place, The Grange (1933)
- Lismhor, No. 11 Easter Belmont Rd, Murrayfield (1933–35)
- 17 Essex Road, Barnton, Edinburgh (1951)

=== Rowand Anderson Kininmonth & Paul ===
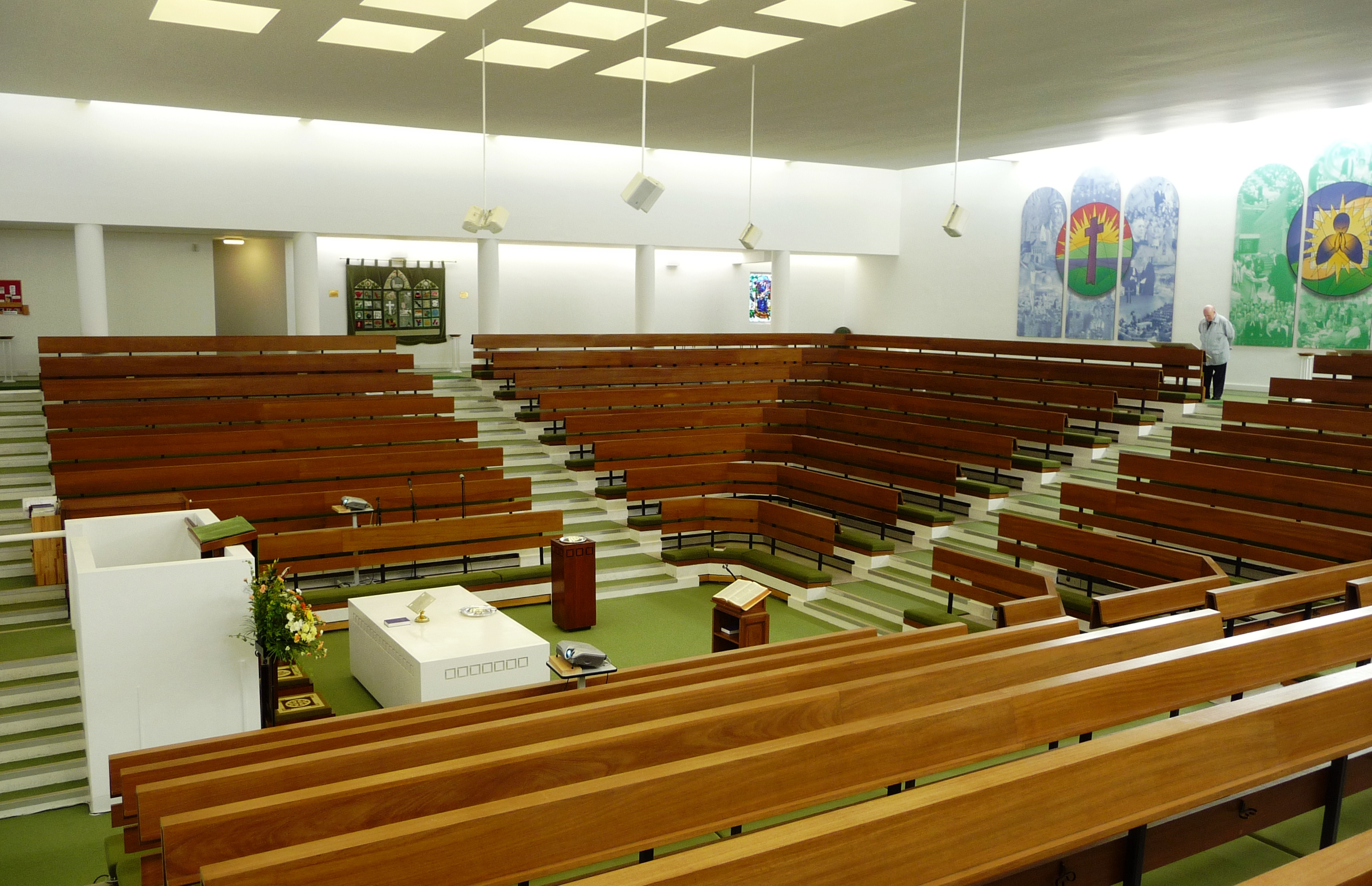
Craigsbank Parish Church, Edinburgh interior

- Adam House, Chambers Street (1954)
- Renfrew Municipal Airport Terminal Building (1954)
- Holland House, first of Edinburgh University's Pollock Halls (1959)
- Mary Erskine's School, Ravelston (1966)
- Scottish Provident Building, No.6 St Andrew Square (1961)
- North British Distillery Company (NBDC) warehouse, Gorgie
- Craigsbank Parish Church, Edinburgh (1964) listed category A
- The Vennel, Linlithgow (1967)
