= Iain McKell =

British fashion, portrait and social documentary photographer

- Born: Weymouth
- Occupation: Photographer
- Website: iainmckell.com

Iain McKell is a British fashion, portrait and social documentary photographer. He has specialized in photographing British subcultures since the 1980s and his work has been published in L'uomo Vogue, i-D and The Face.

== Early life ==
McKell grew up in the West Country, England. He received his formal education at Clifton College, in Bristol. He began working as a seaside photographer in Weymouth, Dorset at the age of 19. After studying graphic design at Exeter College of Art and Design, he relocated to London in 1979, where he found work as a commercial photographer.

== Career ==
McKell held a public exhibition in his own studio in 1984 entitled Iain McKell LIVE, where he photographed members of The Comic Strip, and many of the visitors. This was followed in 1985 by an open workshop in The Photographers' Gallery, showing his work and a documentary film about the previous year. He was subsequently commissioned by Smirnoff and Red Stripe for commercial brand advertising campaigns. McKell has specialized in photographing British subcultures since the 1980s, producing photographic studies of Skinheads, punks, Blitz Kids, and rockabillies. He also spent over ten years befriending and photographing New Age travellers. The result of this project was the publication of a book and various exhibitions. In 2012 he worked with Kate Moss on a photo project for V magazine titled 'Kate & The Gypsies'. In 2012 he published his third book entitled Beautiful Britain, comprising a collection of his photographic work between 1970 and 2012.

== Books ==
- Fashion Forever: 30 years of subculture. New York: Thames & Hudson, 2004 ISBN 1903781086.
- The New Gypsies. Munich: Prestel, 2011. ISBN 3791345192
- Beautiful Britain: Photographs from the 1970s to the Present. Munich: Prestel, 2012. ISBN 978-3791347011

== Exhibitions ==
- Then & Now, Story Gallery, London, 2001.
- The New Gypsies, Fashion Space Gallery, London, 2011; Acte 2 Photo, Paris, 2011; Clic Gallery, New York, 2011.
