= Alexander Kininmonth =

Alexander Kininmonth may refer to:

- Alexander de Kininmund (d. 1344), archdeacon of Lothian and bishop of Aberdeen
- Alexander de Kininmund (d. 1380), archdeacon of Aberdeen and bishop of Aberdeen
