= Edinburgh College of Art =

Art school at the University of Edinburgh

Coordinates: 55°56′42.68″N 3°11′53.52″W

- Colaiste Ealain Dhùn Èideann
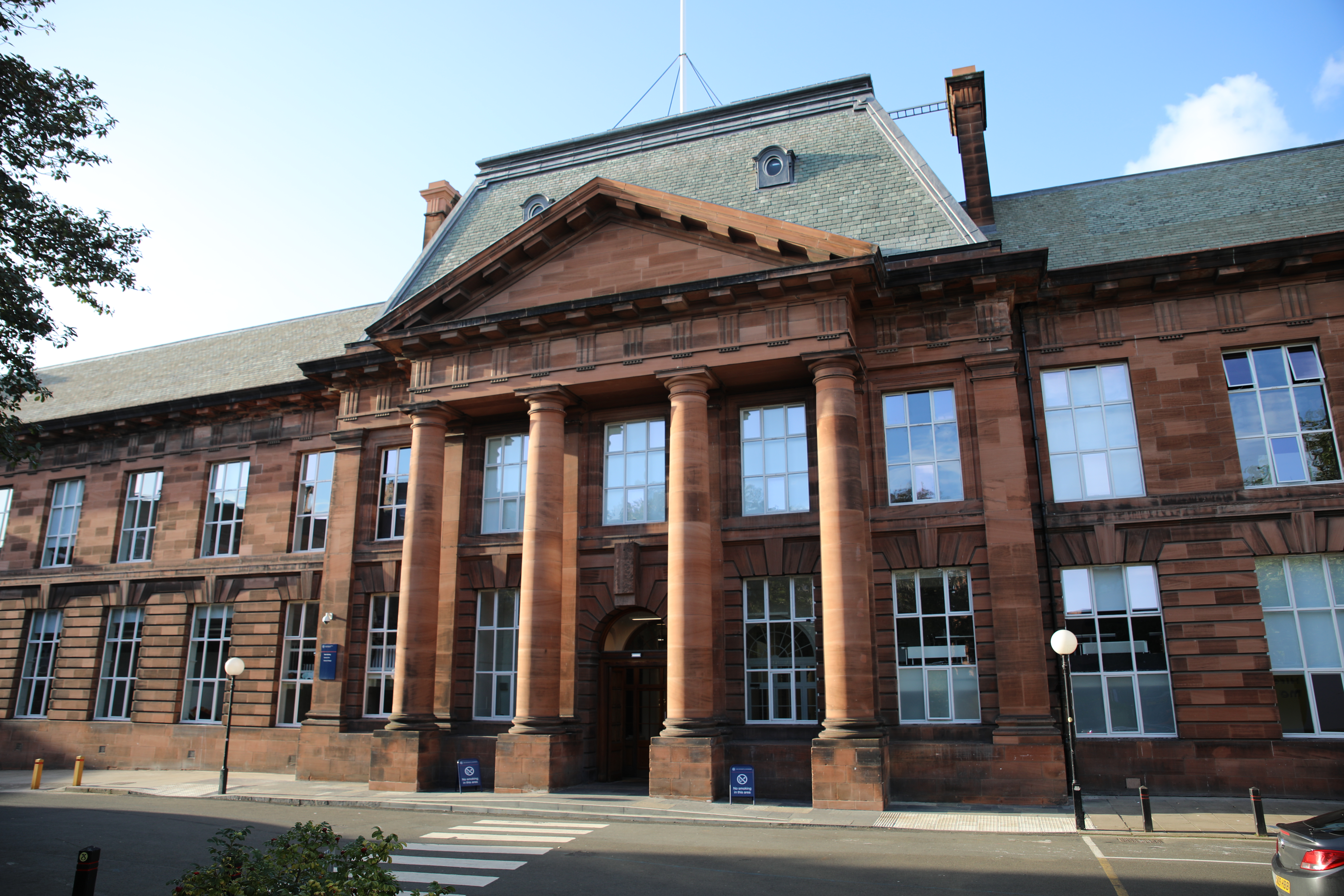
- Type: Art school
- Established: 1760; 266 years ago
- Parent institution: University of Edinburgh (2004–present); Heriot-Watt University (1966–2004); Heriot-Watt College (1885–1966); Watt Institution and School of Arts (1852–1885)
- Chancellor: HRH The Princess Royal, Chancellor of the University
- Principal: Professor Juan Cruz
- Faculty: 447 (203 FTE) (Sep 2021)
- Administrative staff: 158 (133 FTE)
- Students: 3,365 (2020–21)
- Undergraduates: 2,210
- Postgraduates: 885 (taught postgraduates)
- Doctoral students: 265
- Location: Edinburgh, Scotland, UK
- Website: www.eca.ed.ac.uk

The Edinburgh College of Art (ECA) is a department within the College of Arts, Humanities and Social Sciences at the University of Edinburgh in Scotland.

Tracing its history back to 1760, it provides higher education in art and design, architecture, history of art, and music disciplines for over three thousand students and is at the forefront of research and research-led teaching in the creative arts, humanities, and creative technologies. ECA comprises five subject areas: School of Art, Reid School of Music, School of Design, School of History of Art, and Edinburgh School of Architecture & Landscape Architecture (ESALA). ECA is mainly located in the Old Town of Edinburgh, overlooking the Grassmarket; the Lauriston Place campus is located in the University of Edinburgh's Central Area Campus, not far from George Square.

The college was founded in 1760, and gained its present name and site in 1907. Formerly associated with Heriot-Watt University, its degrees have been issued by the University of Edinburgh since 2004. The college formally merged with the university on 1 August 2011, combining with the School of Arts, Culture and Environment and continues to exist with the name Edinburgh College of Art as an enlarged school in the College of Arts, Humanities and Social Sciences.

== History ==
Edinburgh College of Art (ECA) can trace its history back to 1760, when the Trustees Drawing Academy of Edinburgh was established by the Board of Trustees for Fisheries, Manufactures and Improvements in Scotland. This board had been set up by Act of Parliament in 1727 to "encourage and promote the fisheries or such other manufactures and improvements in Scotland as may most conduce to the general good of the United Kingdom". The aim of the academy was to train designers for the manufacturing industries. Drawing and the design of patterns for the textile industries were taught at the Academy's rooms at Picardy Place.

The board was responsible for the construction of the Royal Institution (named for the Royal Institution for the Encouragement of the Fine Arts in Scotland), now the Royal Scottish Academy building, on The Mound and also commissioned the Scottish National Portrait Gallery on Queen Street. From 1826, classes were held at the Royal Institution building. The master of the school was always a fine artist, the first being French painter William Delacour. Subsequent masters included Alexander Runciman and David Allan. The academy's focus gradually shifted from applied arts to encompass fine art, and the school gained a reputation for excellence in both painting and design. Scottish artists who were trained at the Academy include John Brown, Alexander Nasmyth and Andrew Wilson.

In 1858, the academy was affiliated to the Science and Art Department in London, known as the "South Kensington system", under which it became the Government School of Art for the city of Edinburgh. A School of Applied Art was also established under this system. The Drawing School became part of a system of schools managed on similar lines, and distinctive teaching practices were lost. In 1903 it amalgamated with the School of Applied Art. In 1907, the Scottish Education Department took over responsibility for the school, and it became Edinburgh College of Art.

Frank Mears taught architecture at the college on a part-time basis from 1918. In 1925, he began lecturing on planning and, in 1932, founded a one-year postgraduate diploma course in Town and Country Planning.

ECA was officially recognised by the Scottish Government as a Small Specialist Institution for the teaching of art, design and architecture prior to the merger with University of Edinburgh in 2011. From 1968 it was associated with Heriot-Watt University for degree awarding purposes but the validation agreement with Heriot-Watt University was due to end in 2012. In 2004 ECA partnered with the University of Edinburgh for degree awarding purposes, an Academic Federation Agreement to facilitate closer collaboration was put in place between the two institutions in 2007 and they merged in 2011. At the time the merger plan was announced in January 2011, Scottish Government Education Secretary Mike Russell criticised the financial management of ECA.

The joint Edinburgh School of Architecture and Landscape Architecture (ESALA) formed in August 2009 as a joint venture between ECA and the University of Edinburgh.

The first professorship in an ECA subject area was the Reid Professor of Music, which was created in 1839, with the first holder being Scottish composer John Thomson who conducted the first Reid concert in 1841. The Watson Gordon Chair of Fine Art founded some forty years later, the first of its kind in the British Isles and a turning point in the teaching of the History of Art.

In 2005, the college joined with Edinburgh Napier University to launch the Screen Academy Scotland, a new centre of excellence in film learning and education.

== College buildings ==
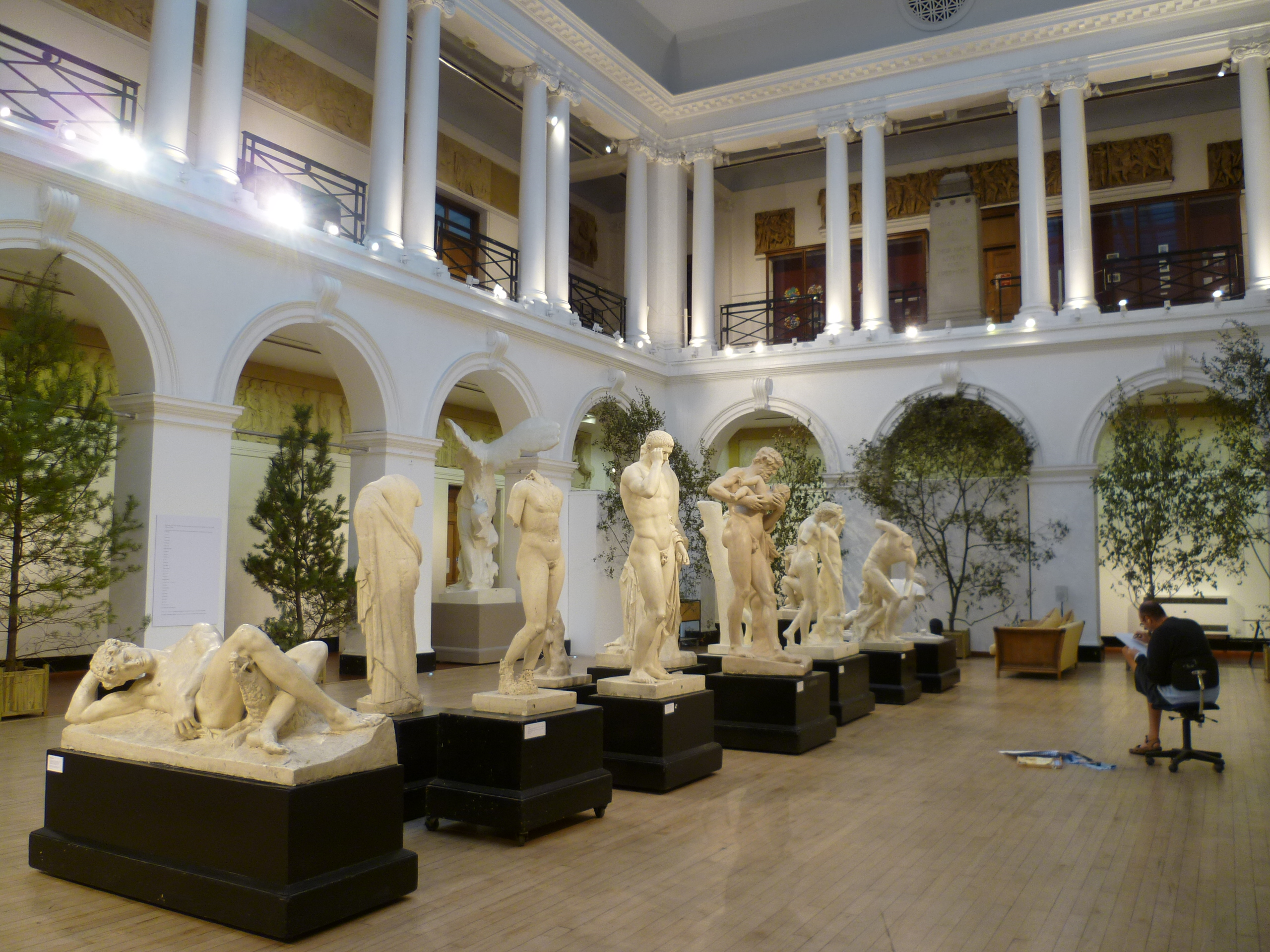
Sculpture Court

With the creation of Edinburgh College of Art in 1907, the institution moved to new premises on Lady Lawson Street. Formerly a cattle market, the site lies above the Grassmarket and opposite Edinburgh Castle. The red sandstone main building was designed in the Beaux-Arts style by John Wilson while working for John More Dick Peddie and George Washington Browne, and was completed in 1909. The main building was listed Category A in 1970. Inside, the Sculpture Court displays casts of the Elgin Marbles and other antique statuary, alongside changing displays of contemporary student's work.

The Architecture Building was added to the east end of the college in 1961, designed by architect Ralph Cowan, who was a professor of architecture at the college. In 1977 the Lauriston Campus was expanded with the addition of the Hunter Building. This L-shaped red sandstone block, designed by Anthony Wheeler in 1971, encloses the college courtyard and fronts Lauriston Place to the south. In the 1990s the college took over a separate group of buildings in the Grassmarket, for use as a library and teaching space, and also took over the former Salvation Army building on West Port. These buildings in the Grassmarket and West Port were disposed of after the college purchased Evolution House.

The nine-storey Evolution House on West Port by Reiach and Hall Architects was completed 2003, adjacent to the main college building. Built as speculative offices, it now houses the art and design library, as well as providing design studios and office facilities for the School of Design. While the college remains mainly concentrated on the Lauriston Place Campus, as a result of the merger with the University of Edinburgh in August 2011, the new enlarged ECA incorporated Minto House on Chambers Street (part of ESALA) and Alison House in Nicolson Square (Reid School of Music). In 2017, the Lauriston Campus expanded to include the former Lothian & Borders Fire & Rescue Service Headquarters, formerly housing the'Museum of Fire', Building (arch. Robert Morham, 1897–1901).

The Wee Red Bar serves as the student union bar, and acts as a year-round venue for gigs and theatre shows, and also acts a venue during the Edinburgh Festival Fringe.

== Events and exhibitions ==
In August 1970, during the Edinburgh International Festival, students staged the STRATEGY: GET ARTS event at the college. Participants included the German performance artist and art theorist Joseph Beuys.

At the invitation of Angus MacLean, president of the Students' Representative Council, the conceptual artist Stephen Willats came to the college to participate in a three-day event on the theme of 'the artist and the community' in March 1972. This led in the following year to the development of the Edinburgh Social Model Construction Project focused on the communities of Leith, Morningside, Slateford and Silverknowes. Willats presented a paper about the project at the Computer Arts Society symposium on the Edinburgh Festival Fringe in August 1973.

In 1982, Kirkland Main co-ordinated the On the Side Of Life: Patrick Geddes 1854 – 1932 exhibition which was mounted in the Sculpture Court during the Festival to celebrate 50 years of teaching Town and Country Planning at the college. The exhibition was designed by John L. Paterson and researched and curated by Michael Cuthbert, Elizabeth Cumming and Martin Andrew Forrest.

From 2020 to 2023, the college was the venue for the Edinburgh International Book Festival.

== Notable alumni and academics ==
See also Category:Alumni of the Edinburgh College of Art

=== Architects ===
- Ian Begg (1925–2017)
- Rab and Denise Bennetts, founders of Bennetts Associates
- David J. Burney, commissioner at the New York City Department of City Planning
- Alan Balfour, former dean of the Georgia Tech College of Architecture
- Theodore S. Clerk, (1909–1965), city planner, first Ghanaian architect and developer of the port city of Tema
- Sir Nicholas Grimshaw (born 1939), architect of the Eden Project, president of the Royal Academy since 2004
- Sir William Kininmonth (1904–1988), architect of Adam House and Pollock Halls, both in Edinburgh
- John McAslan, architect
- Sir Robert Matthew (1906–1975), designed the Royal Commonwealth Pool and founded RMJM
- Sir Frank C. Mears (1880 - 1953), architect and planner
- Sir James Dunbar-Nasmith (born 1927), conservation architect and head of ECA's Department of Architecture 1978–1988
- Patrick Nuttgens (1930–2004), academic and writer on architecture
- B. Marcus Priteca (1889–1971), theatre architect
- Sir Basil Spence (1907–1976), architect of Coventry Cathedral and the New Zealand Parliament Building (nicknamed 'The Beehive') in Wellington, New Zealand

=== Artists ===
- Sarah Gough Adamson, landscape painter
- Sam Ainsley, artist
- Barbara Balmer, painter
- Violet Banks, painter
- Wilhelmina Barns-Graham, artist
- Mardi Barrie, artist
- Dame Elizabeth Blackadder, artist
- John Blair, artist
- Elizabeth York Brunton, painter and printmaker
- Hugh Buchanan, artist
- Kitty Burns, artist
- Alexander Beauchamp Cameron, painter
- Paul Carter, artist
- John Kingsley Cook, artist and College lecturer
- Stanley Cursiter, artist
- Alan Davie, artist
- Mabel Dawson, painter
- Isobelle Ann Dods-Withers, painter
- Yvonne Drewry, painter and printmaker
- Jean Duncan, painter and printmaker
- Moyna Flannigan, painter and printmaker
- William Geissler, artist
- William George Gillies, artist
- Tom Gourdie, artist
- Sir James Gunn, artist
- Charles Martin Hardie, artist
- William Hole, artist
- Gwyneth Leech, artist
- Tessa Lynch, artist
- William McLaren, artist
- Wendy McMurdo, artist
- Caroline McNairn, artist
- David Michie, artist
- John Maxwell, artist
- Robert Montgomery, artist and poet
- Katie Paterson, artist and Honorary Fellow of the University of Edinburgh (2013)
- Sir Robin Philipson, artist
- John Platt, artist
- Nina Pope and Karen Guthrie, aka Somewhere
- Barbara Rae, painter and printmaker
- Anne Redpath, artist
- Patrick Reyntiens, artist
- Paul Rooney, artist
- Helen Stevenson, printmaker
- Alan Sutherland, artist
- Scott Sutherland, sculptor
- Adam Bruce Thomson, artist
- Clare Twomey, artist
- Richard Wright, artist, winner of the 2009 Turner Prize
- Frances Walker, printmaker

=== Painters ===
- John Bellany, painter
- William Crozier, painter
- Victorine Foot, painter
- William Gear, painter
- Alan Gourley – painter and stained glass artist
- Nicola Green, painter
- Callum Innes, painter and Turner Prize nominee
- Lady Caroline Kininmonth, painter
- Henry John Lintott, painter
- David McClure, painter
- Alexander McNeish, painter
- Sir William MacTaggart, painter
- John Menzies (painter) (1871-1939), landscape and portrait painter, taught drawing and composition at Edinburgh
- Emily Murray Paterson, painter
- Janet Pierce, painter
- Samuel Robin Spark, painter
- David Dougal Williams, painter

=== Sculptors ===
- Phyllis Bone, sculptor
- Mary Syme Boyd, sculptor
- Alexander Carrick, sculptor and academic
- Fanny Lam Christie, sculptor
- Christopher Hall, sculptor
- David Harding, sculptor
- Pilkington Jackson, sculptor of the Robert the Bruce statue at Bannockburn, and the college war memorial (1922)
- Donald Locke, sculptor
- Hew Lorimer, sculptor
- Kate Campbell Muirhead, sculptor
- Elizabeth Ogilvie, sculptor
- James Pittendrigh MacGillivray, sculptor
- Sir Eduardo Paolozzi, sculptor and artist
- Scott Sutherland, sculptor

=== Musicians ===
- Louise Alder, soprano
- Sandy Brown, Scottish jazz clarinettist
- Anna Clyne, composer
- Django Django, band
- Al Fairweather, Scottish jazz trumpeter
- Futuristic Retro Champions, Scottish ElectroPop band
- John Maclean, member of The Beta Band and The Aliens.
- Sir James MacMillan, composer and conductor
- Stuart MacRae, composer
- The Magnificents, Scottish rock band
- Jamie Muir, percussionist with Music Improvisation Company, King Crimson, Giles, Muir, Cunningham
- Peter Nelson, composer and music theorist, Emeritus Professor of Music
- Nigel Osborne, composer, teacher, aid worker, Emeritus Professor of Music
- The Rezillos, 1970s new wave band, featuring Jo Callis who went on to The Human League
- Sir Donald Runnicles, conductor
- Rebecca Saunders, composer
- Derek Williams, composer, arranger, conductor
- Roy Williamson, member of The Corries, and author of Flower of Scotland

=== Writers ===
- John Arden, playwright
- Alan Bold, poet
- Ruthven Todd, poet, novelist

=== Other ===
- Dorothy Angus, embroidery artist
- Harriet Braine, musical comedian and archivist
- Shashi Caan, interior architect/designer and president of The International Federation of Interior Architects/Designers
- Rose Ferraby, archaeologist and artist
- Holly Fulton, fashion designer
- Tom Gauld, cartoonist and illustrator
- Supriya Lele, fashion designer
- Katie Leung, stage and screen actress – obtained photography degree
- John Maclean, film director
- Ryan McHenry, film director
- Kerry Anne Mullaney, film director
- David Shaw Nicholls, designer & architect
- Sandy Paris, cricketer
- Aileen Paterson writer and illustrator of children's books
- Adam Robson, rugby player, former head of the Scottish Rugby Union
- Alexander White, footwear designer
- Johanna Gibbons, landscape architect
- Andrew Grant, landscape architect

== See also ==
- List of further and higher education colleges in Scotland
- Leith School of Art, in the north of the city.
