= Caroline Kininmonth =

British artist (1907–1978)

Lady Caroline Kininmonth (1907–1978) was a British artist, known for her paintings of flowers and landscapes in both oil and watercolours.

== Biography ==
Kininmonth spent most of her life in Edinburgh and studied at the Edinburgh College of Art from 1926 to 1930. Working in oils, she painted still-life and botanic subjects plus rural scenes and landscapes. During the 1940s and 1950s she was a regular exhibitor at the Royal Scottish Academy, showing some twenty-five works there. Kininmonth also exhibited with the Scottish Society of Women Artists and the Royal Glasgow Institute of the Fine Arts. She was married to the architect Sir William Kininmonth. The University of Edinburgh and the Arts Council of Scotland hold examples of her paintings.
