= Exeter College of Art and Design =

Former art college in Devon, England

Coordinates: 50.709914°N 3.513501°W

- Active: 1854–2000
- Location: Exeter, Devon, England

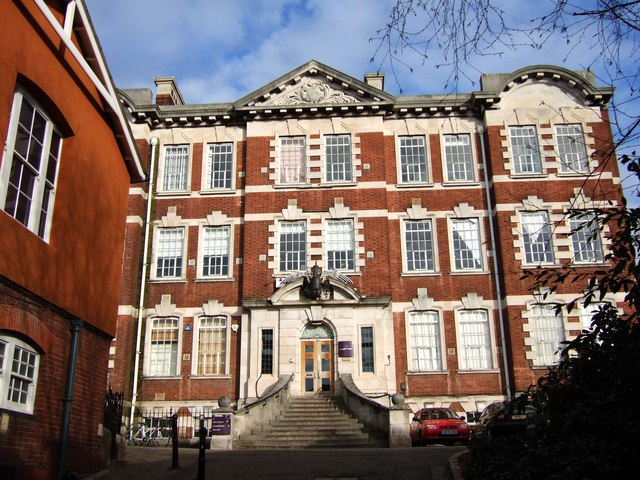
The old School of Art building, now the Phoenix arts centre

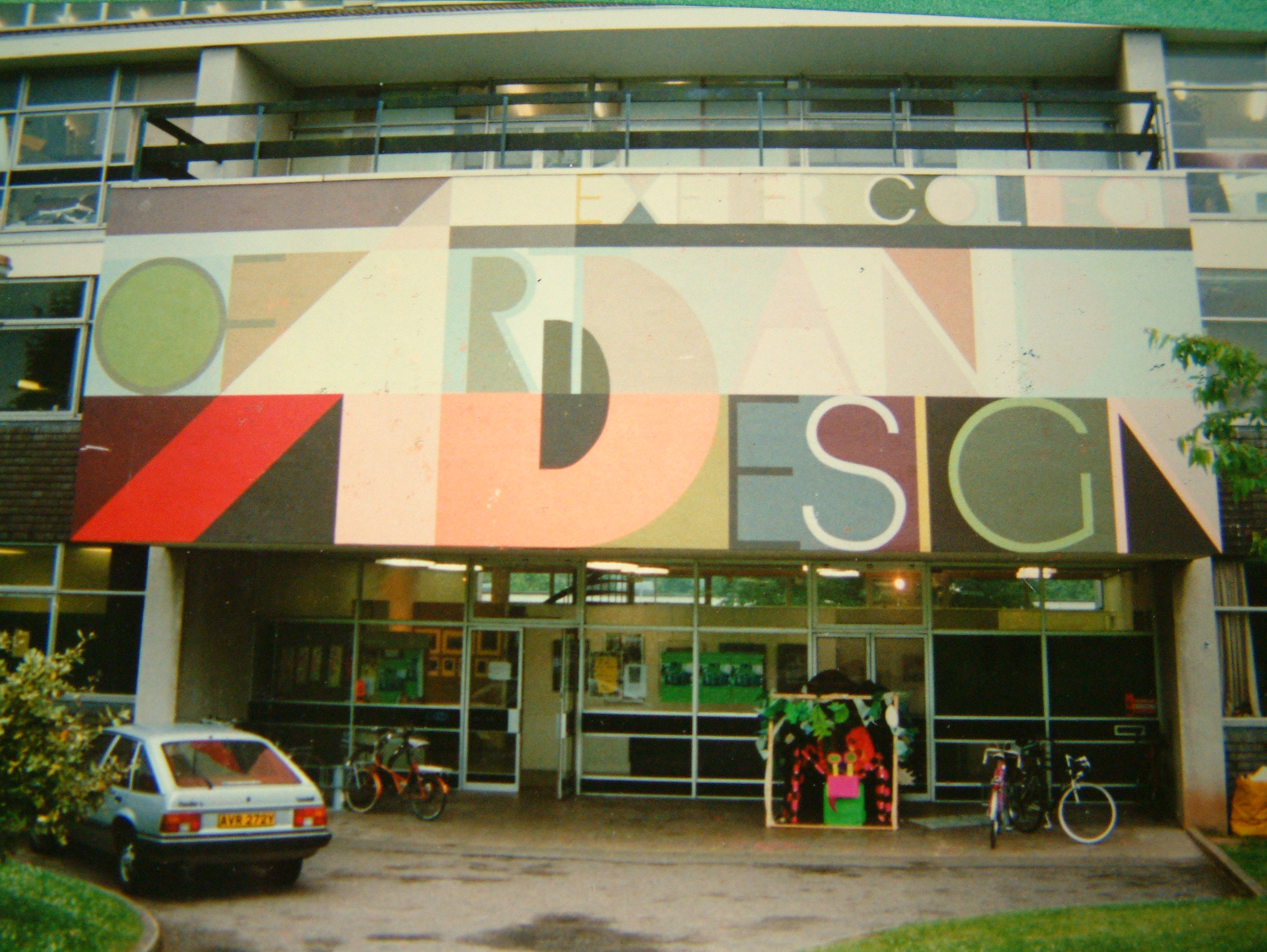
Exeter College of Art and Design Earl Richards Road North site 1980's

Exeter College of Art and Design was an art college based in Exeter, Devon. Founded in 1854, it amalgamated with what would become Plymouth University in 1989.

The main building was located at Earl Richards Road North Exeter from the 1970s with some facilities based at Barts until the early 1980s. Graphics was based on Gandy Street in the old School of Art buildings until it relocated to the main site in 1984. The Printmaking department was initially located at The Mint. The Art College offered higher education courses including Foundation, BA (Hons) and Combination courses with the University of Exeter as well as MA/Pg diplomas. Disciplines were, Fine Art Ceramics, Graphics, Painting, Printmaking, Photography, Sculpture and 4D (Film, Video, Sound).

The Priory Press was introduced by Alan Richards and Bernard Beard in association with The Bartholomew Print Workshop in the 1960s and produces limited edition handmade printed books.

== History ==
The School of Art was founded in Exeter in 1854 as part of the Royal Albert Memorial Museum and promoted by Edward Bowring Stephens, a local sculptor. In 1858, decorative designer Kent Kingdon offered a £5 prize for a decorative design.

In 1951, The Exeter School of Art was renamed as the Exeter Central College of Art.

Clifford Fishwick (1923–1997) was appointed Painting Master in 1947 and was principal of the college from 1958 to 1984. A skilled painter, having trained at Liverpool School of Art, he was a friend of Peter Lanyon and exhibited regularly with the Penwith Society of Arts. Fishwick is now regarded as an important, if underrated, figure in post-war British painting and one of the better artists of the St Ives group.

In 1966, students' print work was featured in an exhibition entitled "An Approach to Printmaking in Exeter" at The Whitechapel Gallery, London. In 1973, the College was renamed again as Exeter College of Art and Design and a new building opened at Earl Richards Road North on the outskirts of Exeter.

In 1976, painting tutor John Butler set up The Spacex (art gallery) which became a registered educational charity in 1990.

The college amalgamated with Polytechnic South West, based in Plymouth, in 1989, and in 2007 the facilities moved permanently to the Plymouth Campus. In 2011, planning permission was granted to demolish and redevelop the site to provide 39 dwellings with parking and landscaping.

== Tutors ==
- Clifford Fishwick (Principal) 1958–84
- Edward Allington (Fellow Ceramics) then Professor, Head of Graduate Sculpture at Slade School of Fine Art
- Chris Garret (4D, also Biff cartoons)
- Marek Laczynski (Printmaking)
- Ray Smith (Painting)
- Alexander McNeish (Head of Painting)
- George Stephenson (Senior Lecturer in Fine art and Sculpture)

== Alumni ==
- John Angel (1881–1960) sculptor
- Christian Birmingham illustrator
- Penny Dale illustrator and writer of children's books.
- Julian Dawson (b. 1954) singer songwriter author
- Elaine M. Goodwin author and mosaic artist
- Iain McKell fashion, portrait and social documentary photographer
- Jon Middlemiss studio potter
- William Snell Morrish (1844–1917) landscape painter
- Chris Pig (b. 1965) printmaker
- Richard Starzak English animator, screenwriter, and film director.
- Andrew Sumner Movie journalist, publisher and TV presenter
- Kev F. Sutherland (b. 1961) comedian and comic strip creator
- Keith Towler social worker
- Heather Tweed (b. 1959) visual artist
- Frederick John Widgery (1861–1942) landscapist and mayor of Exeter
