= Poor. Old. Tired. Horse. =

British visual poetry periodical

Poor. Old. Tired. Horse. (POTH) was a British periodical of visual poetry, running for 25 issues from 1962 to 1967. It was published by Wild Hawthorn Press, which was set up a year earlier in 1961 by Ian Hamilton Finlay. Although most associated with the concrete poetry movement, POTH also contained traditional and avant-garde works. The name originates from a poem by the American poet Robert Creeley.
