= ATLAS Arts =

- Established: 2010
- Location: Portree, Skye, Scotland
- Coordinates: 57.411389°N 6.192071°W
- Type: contemporary art organisation
- Director: Emma Nicolson
- Website: atlasarts.org.uk

ATLAS Arts is a visual arts organisation dedicated to commissioning contemporary arts, culture, heritage, and education based in the Isle of Skye. It was formed in 2010 and since then has delivered a varied programme of contemporary art including installations, sculpture, live performances, film screenings, and collaborative public works. It is one of Creative Scotland's portfolio of regularly-funded organisations.

== History ==
ATLAS Arts was founded in 2010, partly in response to the closure of Skye's former arts centre An Tuireann, and following research conducted by the Scottish Arts Council which found that Skye and Lochalsh had the largest gap in visual arts provision in the northwest of Scotland. Initially the organisation was hosted by HI~Arts (a cultural development agency for the Highlands and Islands of Scotland) until 2012, when it became an independent organisation with charitable status.

From 2013 to 2015 ATLAS Arts collaborated with the Uist-based museum and arts centre Taigh Chearsabhagh to produce a pan-island programme of exhibitions, events, performances, and new commissions. Called Broad Reach, this included hosting an exhibition of work by Vija Celmins as part of the ARTIST ROOMS series of touring exhibitions.

In summer 2014 ATLAS Arts participated in the Scotland-wide exhibition programme GENERATION: 25, commissioning a two large scale out door works and public programme by artists Joanne Tatham and Tom O’Sullivan.

In October 2014 it was announced that the organisation had secured three-year funding as part of Creative Scotland's portfolio of 119 regularly-funded organisations for the period 2015–2018.

== Aims ==
ATLAS Arts' stated aims are to promote the advancement of contemporary art, and culture by promoting and enabling access, initiating projects, and providing opportunities for artists. A strong theme reflected in all the work commissioned by the organisation has been the environment, history, and culture of Isle of Skye and beyond. Additionally the organisation also promotes the advancement of education and the general public's awareness of visual art and culture through a variety of learning programmes including exhibitions, film screenings, performances, talks, workshops, and publications.

== Past projects ==
Artists whom ATLAS Arts have exhibited or collaborated with include:

- Alec Finlay
- Alex Frost
- Anne Martin
- Augustus Veinoglou
- Bethan Huws
- Bobby Niven
- Cailean Maclean
- Caroline Bergvall
- Caroline Dear
- Ceara Conway
- Colin McPherson
- Cooking Sections (Daniel Fernández Pascual & Alon Schwabe)
- Chris Dooks
- Craig Coulthard
- David Lemm
- David Littler
- Deirdre Nelson
- Derek Robertson
- Edwin Pickstone
- Ellie Harrison
- Emma Balkind
- Frances Priest
- Graham Fagan
- Hanna Tuulikki
- Hardeep Pandhal
- Hector MacInnes
- Henry Castle
- Ilana Halperin
- In the Shadow of the Hand (Sarah Forrest and Virginia Hutchinson)
- J. Maizlish Mole
- Jason Singh
- Jeremy Sutton-Hibbert
- Jessica Ramm
- Joanne Tatham
- John Akomfrah
- Johnny Rodger
- Kate McMorrine
- Keg de Souza
- Kirsty McKeown
- Lateral North
- Leighton Jones
- Let's Talk about Space (Kieran Heather and Chris McGarry)
- Luke Fowler
- Marcus Jack
- Margaret Salmon
- Martin Campbell
- Maoilios Caimbeul, also known as Myles Campbell
- Meg Bateman
- Michail Mersinis
- Morag Henriksen
- Niall Macdonald
- Neil Bromwich
- Neil Mulholland
- Nick Hand
- Nicky Bird
- René Jansen
- Richard Skelton
- Robin Haig
- Rody Gorman
- Ruth Barker
- Sharon Quigley
- Sophie Gerrard
- Sophie Morrish
- Su Grierson
- Susan Brind
- Steve Dilworth
- Stuart McAdam
- Thomas Joshua Cooper
- Thomson & Craighead (Jon Thomson and Alison Craighead)
- Tom O’Sullivan
- Vija Celmins
- Will Maclean
- Wounded Knee, also known as Drew Wright
- Zoë Walker

== See also ==
- Creative Scotland
- GENERATION: 25 Years of Contemporary Art in Scotland
- Artist Rooms
