= Ann Martin =

Ann or Anne Martin may refer to:

- Ann M. Martin (born 1955), American author of children's and young adult books
- Ann Martin (journalist), American journalist and news anchor
- Anne Martin (rower) (born 1961), American rower
- Anne Henrietta Martin (1875–1951), suffragist, pacifist, and author from the U.S. state of Nevada
- Bette Bright, English rock singer, born Anne Martin
- Anne Martin (Gaelic singer) (born 1963)

== See also ==
- Anne-Marie Martin (born 1957), Canadian actress and writer
- Lee Ann Martin, Canadian judge
- Anna Martin (disambiguation)
- Annie Martin (disambiguation)
