= Flying Scotsman =

Flying Scotsman may refer to:

- LNER Class A3 4472 Flying Scotsman, steam locomotive built in 1923
- Flying Scotsman (train), London to Edinburgh service since 1862
  - The Flying Scotsman (1929 film), featuring the train and the 1923 locomotive
- Flying Scotsman, nickname of Scottish athlete and rugby player Eric Liddell (1902–1945)
- The Flying Scotsman, nickname of darts player Gary Anderson
- The Flying Scotsman, nickname of Scottish cyclist Graeme Obree
  - The Flying Scotsman (2006 film), about Graeme Obree
- "Flying Scotsman", a song by Spear of Destiny from the 1983 album Grapes of Wrath
- Flying Scotsman Stakes, a horse race run at Doncaster Racecourse
- Scottish Stores, a pub in Kings Cross, London, formerly known as the Flying Scotsman

== See also ==
- Flying Scot (disambiguation)
