= Rab Wilson =

Scottish poet

Rab Wilson (born 1 September 1960, in New Cumnock, Ayrshire) is a Scottish poet who writes mainly in the Scots language. His works include a Scots translation of the Rubaiyat of Omar Khayyam, and the poetry books Accent o the Mind, Life Sentence, and A Map for the Blind.

== Life ==
He held an engineering apprenticeship with the National Coal Board, working at Barony Pit in Ayrshire, but gave up mining as a result of the 1984–1985 United Kingdom miners' strike and instead trained as a psychiatric nurse.

As well as poetry, he has also campaigned on health issues, for the rights of health workers to speak openly about their concerns and act as whistleblowers.

In 2012 he spoke to lawyers at the 4th European Collaborative Conference.

He is closely connected with Scottish national poet Robert Burns, who was also from Ayrshire. Wilson worked on the project Burnsiana with Calum Colvin and discovered that Burns may have taken part of Tam O' Shanter from English poet Edmund Bolton.

In 2013 he was selected as the first James Hogg Creative Resident, living and writing in Ettrick Valley, home of the poet and writer James Hogg.

He won the 2008 McCash Scots poetry competition.

In 2009 he jokingly threatened to behead Conservative politician Kenneth Baker while giving the address to the haggis at the Wordsworth Trust Book Festival Burns Night.

== Works ==
=== The Jolly Beggars ===
Wilson adapted Robert Burns' The Jolly Beggars for the stage. It was a runner-up for the 2007 McLellan Award for Play Writing.

=== Ye're There Horace! ===
Ye're There Horace! was an art book based on the Roman satirist Horace, made in conjunction with artist Hugh Bryden.

=== Burnsiana ===
Burnsiana is a collaboration with artist Calum Colvin, producing an art exhibition and book featuring poems written by Wilson in response to the work of Robert Burns. Colvin produced artworks by painting Burns-related images onto rooms full of objects.

=== Other poetry ===
His other works include the 15-sonnet sequence 1957 Flying Scot, a tribute to a Scottish bicycle manufacturer's marque, Flying Scot. The sequence has been performed as far afield as Brooklyn.
