= Joseph McKenzie =

Scottish photographer

Joseph McKenzie (19 March 1929 – 5 July 2015) was a British photographer known as the "father of modern Scottish photography". He is known for his black and white images of post-war Scottish lives amid urban decay and redevelopment.

McKenzie was born in London in 1929. During the Second World War and afterwards until 1952, McKenzie served as a photographer in the Royal Air Force. Then from 1952 until 1954, he studied photography at the London College of Printing. He initially taught photography at Saint Martin's School of Art, and was later appointed as lecturer in photography at Duncan of Jordanstone College of Art and Design in Dundee where he worked until his retirement in 1986. His students nicknamed him the 'one shot wonder.' for his ability to capture the desired shot only using one frame. Joseph developed and printed all his own work. He was very influential in developing documentary photography as an art in Scotland, and notably helping establish the careers of Calum Colvin and Albert Watson.

During the 1960s McKenzie's photography was exhibited widely throughout Scotland, with notably Glasgow Gorbals Children (1965), Dundee - A City in Transition (1966), Dunfermline and its People, Down among the Dead Men, Gorbals Revisited, and Caledonian Images (Scottish Arts Council, 1969). In 1970 his exhibition Hibernian Images created controversy in its depictions of the embattled lives of young people in Northern Ireland. Amid attempts to censor his work he then largely withdrew from public exhibitions.

A retrospective of his work was held at the Third Eye Centre in August 1987, and published in Pages of Experience; photographs 1947-1987. Another collection, Gorbals children: A Study in Photographs was published in 1990. In 1997 an exhibition, Witness to Mortality: Photographs by Joseph McKenzie was held at the Gallery of Modern Art, Glasgow.
