= Wendy McMurdo =

British photographer

- Born: 1962 (age 63–64); Edinburgh, Scotland
- Education: University of Westminster; Goldsmiths, University of London; Pratt Institute, Brooklyn; Edinburgh College of Art
- Known for: art, contemporary fine art, photography, digital media

Wendy McMurdo (born 1962) specialises in photography and digital media. In 2018 she was named as one of the Hundred Heroines, an award created by the Royal Photographic Society to showcase global female photographic practice.

== Early life and education ==
McMurdo was born in Edinburgh, Scotland. She attended Edinburgh College of Art, Goldsmiths, University of London and Pratt Institute in Brooklyn, New York where she first became interested in photography.

== Photographic work ==
Her work centres around the relationship between technology and identity and she has produced several influential bodies of work which explore this theme.

In the mid-1990s her first one-person show In a Shaded Place – the digital and the uncanny was toured extensively by the British Council. Her subsequent exhibition at the Centro de Fotografia Universidad de Salamanca in 1998 resulted in the publication of the first monograph on her work. She has been included in numerous group shows, including Unheimlich, curated by Urs Stahel at the Fotomuseum Winterthur in Switzerland, Scanner, curated by Lawrence Rinder at the CCA Wattis Institute for Contemporary Arts, San Francisco, California, The Anagrammatical Body – The Body and its Photographic Condition at the Neue Galerie Graz am Landesmuseum Joanneum in Graz, Austria, and Only Make Believe – Ways of Playing, curated by Marina Warner at Compton Verney, UK.

Her work has been commissioned by the Science Museum, London and the Scottish National Portrait Gallery, Edinburgh, and is in a number of collections including that of the Fotomuseum Winterthur, the British Council, agnès b, the National Galleries of Scotland and Seattle's Henry Art Gallery, Washington, USA. Her work has been the subject of documentaries for BBC Two, Channel 4 and the National Galleries of Scotland.

Other commissions include Indeterminate Objects (classrooms) for The Media Wall, The Photographers' Gallery, London, October 2017 – January 2018; a site-specific project "The World in London" for The Photographers' Gallery exhibited during the 2012 Summer Olympics, and The Skater for the Ffotogallery in Wales, 2009, to celebrate 30 years of photographic commissioning.

Recent exhibitions include: "Chat Room" (2019), curated by Hining Ye for the 2021 Shanghai Photofair; newly commissioned work "Night Garden" as part of Florilegium curated by Emma Nicholson, the inaugural biennial exhibition marking the re-opening of Inverleith House at the Royal Botanic Garden Edinburgh; "On aime l'art...!!" from the Collection Lambert, in Avignon, France (2017); "Gravitas", curated by Christiane Monarchi for Photo50 at the London Art Fair, 2017; DATA RUSH at the Old Sugar Factory in Groningen for the 22nd Noorderlicht International Photofestival; "Digital Play : Wendy McMurdo Collected Works 1995 – 2012" at Street Level Photoworks, Glasgow, as part of GENERATION: 25 Years of Contemporary Art in Scotland, a programme of exhibitions across Scotland in 2014. Her short film "Olympia" was showcased by Onedotzero as part of their Future Cities touring programme in 2011/2012. A retrospective of her photographic work was shown at the Institute of Contemporary Interdisciplinary Arts, University of Bath in 2011/2012.

== Academic career ==
McMurdo has been a board member for Stills Gallery (2015-2020) and New Media Scotland (2011-2014); Jill Todd Photographic Award specialist advisor and judge (2011-2014); Royal Society of Edinburgh Young People's Committee member (2010-2014), and Travelling Gallery advisory panel member (2013-2014); external assessor for MA Photography Review, Central Saint Martins, London (2015); Senior Assessor/Lecturer for the Open College of the Arts, UK; External Validator (BA Photography) University of Chester, UK (2015); Lecturer, School of Fine Art, Duncan of Jordanstone College of Art & Design, University of Dundee, UK (1990-2002) and Lecturer, School of Fine Art, Edinburgh College of Art, University of Edinburgh UK (1985-1897).

She is currently a senior lecturer on the MA Photography programme at Falmouth University. In 2015, McMurdo was awarded a PhD degree by publication from the University of Westminster for her work exploring the impact of the computer on photography and identity formation. She is a Senior Fellow of the Higher Education Academy (SFHEA). In September 2018, McMurdo was elected to the Royal Scottish Academy (RSA) as Member (Elect).

== Awards ==
Helen, Backstage, Merlin Theatre (The Glance) 1996

- Henry Moore Fellow (1993–1995)
- Leverhulme Research Fellow (2000-2002, 2010-2012)
- Creative Scotland Awards (2002, 2014)
- Honorary Research Fellow, European Centre for Photographic Research, University of Wales (2010)
- One of the Hundred Heroines by the Royal Photographic Society (2018)
- RSA Edinburgh Printmakers Publishing Award (2020)

== Publications ==
- Gilda Williams (Ed) (1997). Strange Days – British Contemporary Photography. Charta Press. Milan
- David Brittain (Ed) (1999). Creative Camera: Thirty Years of Writing. Manchester University Press. Manchester
- Centro de Fotografia, Universidad de Salamanca (1998, 2000). Wendy McMurdo. Ediciones Universidad de Salamanca. Spain
- Charlotte Cotton (2004). The Photograph as Contemporary Art (World of Art). Thames & Hudson. London
- David Campany (Ed) (2007). Art and Photography (Themes & Movements). Phaidon Press Ltd. London
- Daniel Rubinstein (2009). Digitally Yours; The Body in Contemporary Photography. The Issues in Contemporary Culture and Aesthetics, 2&3. pp. 181–195. ISBN 0955003725. University of the Arts. London
- Ffotogallery (2009). Wendy McMurdo: The Skater. Ffotogallery. Wales.
- Sylvia Wolf (2010). The Digital Eye: Photographic Art in the Electronic Age. Prestel. New York
- Hilde Van Gelder & Helen Westgeest (2011). Photography Theory in Historical Perspective: Case Studies from Contemporary Art. Wiley-Blackwell. Chichester, UK
- David Hopkins (2021). Dark Toys: Surrealism and the Culture of Childhood. Yale University Press. UK Europe and Overseas
- Various (2021). Nachbilder. Eine Foto Text Anthologie. Herausgegeben von der Plattform Kulturpublizistik der Zurcher Hochschule der Kunste und dem Fotomuseum Winterthur Spector Books.

== Exhibitions ==
=== Solo or two-person exhibitions ===
- superNATURAL, Stills Gallery, Edinburgh, 1999. With Machiko Edmonson.

=== Group exhibitions ===
- ESP – Contemporary Artists Investigate The Paranormal, Ikon gallery, Birmingham, 1999. With Susan Hiller, Brian Catling and Tony Grisoni.
