= Keg (disambiguation) =

A keg is a small cask used for storing liquids.

Keg or KEG may also refer to:

- The Keg, a Canadian-owned chain of steakhouse restaurants and bars
- KEG, postnominals for a Knight of the Order of the Eagle of Georgia
- keg, the ISO 639-3 code for Tese language
- keg, a cane fife, double-headed bass drum
- Keg beer, beer which is served from a pressurized keg

== People ==
- Keg Johnson (1908–1967), American jazz trombonist
- Keg de Souza (born 1978), Australian artist

== See also ==
- KEGG
