= Flying Scot =

Flying Scot may refer to:

- Flying Scot (dinghy), a class of day sailer dinghy designed in 1957
- The Flying Scot (film), a 1957 British crime film directed by Compton Bennett
- Flying Scot (bicycles), a marque used by Scottish bicycle manufacturer, David Rattray and Co.
- Scottish Formula One competitor, Jackie Stewart.

== See also ==
- Flying Scotsman (disambiguation)
