= Derek Robertson =

Derek Robertson may refer to:

- Derek Robertson (American football), American college football quarterback
- Derek Robertson (artist) (born 1967), Scottish artist
- Derek Robertson (footballer) (1949–2015), Scottish football goalkeeper
- Derek Robertson (politician), Australian politician
