= Needlework Development Scheme =

The Needlework Development Scheme (NDS) was a collaborative program between industry and art education that ran from 1934 to 1961. Its aim was to encourage and initiate a new standard for British embroidery design in both hand and machine work. The organisation was primarily responsible for developing collections of foreign and British embroidery, that could be loaned to training colleges, Women's Institutes, and schools.

== Establishment ==
The scheme was started by the four Scottish art schools, Aberdeen, Dundee, Edinburgh and Glasgow in 1934 under the name Needlework Development in Scotland Scheme. The project was a collaboration between industry and art education, that was to help elevate the standard of design and technique in Scottish embroidery. It provided teachers and students with opportunities to study directly from high-quality examples carefully selected from leading designers across the United Kingdom and Europe. The scheme was sponsored anonymously by thread producers J & P Coats. The idea had been conceived by Coats' marketing director in Vienna, Colin Martin. Inspired by the enthusiasm for embroidery and needlework in Hungary, he believed something similar could be done in Scotland and had approached the art schools.

== Development and Growth ==
By 1939, the scheme had collected over 900 embroideries but the outbreak of the Second World War saw the project temporary disbanded. The scheme was restated after the war in 1944. Throughout the 1950s, the program was extended to include schools in England, Wales and Northern Ireland. As the nation began to recover from wartime shortages, new educators brought renewed enthusiasm and innovative techniques improving the standards of the needlework. This period saw an increase in publications by talented designers, featuring rich illustrations that highlighted their unique approaches to embroidery challenges. From 1950 to 1957, exhibitions showcasing pieces from the Scheme were held across the UK, including at the 1951 Festival of Britain. British artists, including the painter and illustrator Mary Kessell were speciality commissioned to create experimental designs for the scheme which could then be reinterpreted in embroidery.

== Impact and Legacy ==
The program ended in 1961, having achieved its original aims, and the collection of over 3,500 embroideries, was given to various museums and organisations, including the Victoria and Albert Museum in London and the National Museum of Scotland in Edinburgh.
