= Sneha Solanki =

- Born: 1973 (age 52–53); Leicester, England
- Occupations: Artist and educator
- Website: electronicartist.net

Sneha Solanki (born 1973, Leicester) is an artist and educator. Her practice includes citizen science, performance, sound and installation.

== Early life ==
Born to parents from Gujarati heritage in Leicester – her father was born in Kenya and her mother in Navsari, Gujarat, India. Initially Solanki's father was refused entry into the UK despite holding a British passport and born under British imperial rule in Kenya. Her father was later admitted into the UK. Both maternal and paternal grandparents lived and worked under British colonial rule in India, Iraq, Kenya and Mauritius. Her parents in the UK both worked in Leicestershire regional manufacturing industries. Solanki has two siblings, an older brother and a younger sister. Solanki lived in Leicester until her later teens when she moved to Loughborough, UK to study art, she then moved to Newcastle upon Tyne, UK, Groningen, NL and to Dundee, UK to further her education.

== Career ==
Solanki holds a BA Hons Fine Art, Northumbria University and a MSc in electronic imaging, Duncan of Jordanstone College of Art and Design, University of Dundee, UK.

Solanki is an artist working in digital/technological materiality with live, unstable and emergent forms encompassing art, science and technology. An early advocate of a ‘user’ rather than ‘consumer’ focus of technology, Sneha introduced digital arts programs into museums, specifically the Discovery Museum, Newcastle upon Tyne and the Baltic Art Gallery, Gateshead. Other projects include working with young people, women's, and girl's groups on digital imaging, video, net-radio/ streaming media and hand-coding.

Continuing with this thread in her practice, Solanki founded and co-directed Polytechnic, an organisation working with a hands-on, open and distributed approach to art & technology where she produced, curated and led a range of national and international activity between 2002 and 2012 (see projects below)

Solanki also teaches at Newcastle University as a visiting lecturer.

== Projects ==
- Sneha Solanki acted as Ecologies programme curator with Ghost Trace Stellar, Open Music Archive, Spectral Ecologies with Martin Howse and the Bio Art Lab, 2010; Grow your own Media Lab with Access Space, Sheffield UK and the open source Cube Cola Lab with Kayle Brandon and Kate Rich
- Solanki also worked in collaboration with artist Kate Rich (Bureau of Inverse Technology & Feral Trade) for a number of years as Hostexe and supermodem, producing audio hospitality events and the first net-casting/net-radio project Flat of Culture (2001) in Newcastle upon Tyne.
- Her seminal work The_Lovers has been shown in the Salon of the Museum of Contemporary Art, Belgrade, The Museum of Contemporary Art of Voivodina, Novi Sad, Brown University Watson Institute, Boston, USA and the Post & Tele Museum, Copenhagen, Denmark.
- Her later artworks include ‘Field Recordings’ - a spectral tour of military communications, ‘Analogue is not Digital’ - a commentary on the death of analogue television, and 'Super-natural' - a synthetic biology artwork which makes a connection between two points in time, the peak in witchcraft from the cusp of the enlightenment period in Western history and the emergent molecular technologies in our current time. Sneha synthesized 'Tituba' a slave and the central protagonist from the Salem witchcraft trials into a new and unique chemically engineered bio-synthetic entity. 'Tituba' was designed as a sensor from circular plasmid vectors and inserts, she was ligated, digested, cloned initially into e-coli DH5 ∂ and then finally transformed into the AmyE gene of Bacillus Subtilis 168 with a two-component regulatory system for sending and receiving signals. She excretes fluorescent protein under stress and is invisible except under blue ultra-violet light. The organism Tituba is currently in deep cryo freeze at −80 °C, Centre for Cell Biology, Newcastle University, UK.

== Other articles in publications ==
- Acoustic.space #7. RIXC & MPLab, Riga, LV. 2008. pg. 260 – 261.
- Reclaiming the Nostalgia of kitchen science – exhibition and work in publication Open_sauces, ed M. Kuzmanovic, Foam, BE. 2010. pg. 42–43.
- Dead History, Live Art? Spectacle, Subjectivity and Subversion in Visual Culture since the 1960s. In: Interaction/Participation: Disembodied performance in new media art. Jonathan Harris (ed.) Tate Liverpool Critical Forum, Volume 9. Liverpool: Liverpool University Press & Tate Liverpool. 2007. pg. 251.
- The Virtual Artaud: Computer Virus As Performance Art. J. Farman in ‘Techknowledgies: New Imaginaries in the Humanities, Arts, and TechnoSciences’. M. Valentis (ed) Cambridge Scholars Press. 2007, pg. 160 – 161.
- Infection as Communication. A. Ludovico. Neural, Issue 22 English edition. 2005, pg. 37.
- Collaboration with Kate Rich here but as supermodem (we also worked as hostexe)

== Sources ==
- "os_reader_p4 [the libarynth]". Libarynth.org. 19 November 2008.
- "Baltic Plus | Home". Balticplus.uk. 20 July 2015.
