= Deborah Phillips =

Scottish painter (born 1965)

- Born: 1965 (age 60–61); Dundee, Scotland
- Occupations: artist, painter

Deborah Phillips (born 1965) is a Scottish painter who has been painting since the age of 14. She worked in merchandise design for approximately a decade and her work was published in notable women's magazines. She began painting full-time in the late 1990s. Her work is owned by both corporate and private collectors throughout the world.

== Biography ==
Deborah Phillips was born in 1965 in Dundee, Scotland the daughter of Scottish artist Douglas Phillips. Phillips' debut at the Royal Scottish Academy and the Royal Glasgow Institute of Fine Art occurred in 1979, when she was fourteen. She graduated with honors from the Duncan of Jordanstone College of Art in 1987 and the following year began working as a merchandise designer for the National Trust for Scotland. In 1993 she accepted a position with Historic Scotland and worked with them for three years as a merchandise controller. Her design work has appeared in magazines including Art Business Today, Artists and Illustrators, International Artist, and Picture Business.

Since the late 1990s, she has painted full-time. Most of her work is painting in acrylics focusing on landscapes of the Scottish countryside. She has exhibited in the United Kingdom and Ireland including venues such as the Royal Scottish Academy, Kensington Exhibition Centre of London, The Bridge Gallery in Dublin, the Glasgow Art Fair, Leith Gallery of Edinburgh and Thompson's Gallery Group of London. She has completed commissions for clients including the Bank of Scotland, Cairn Energy, Marks & Spencer, Princess Anna of Ysenburg and Büdingen and Standard Life.
