= Marine Joatton =

French sculptor (born 1972)

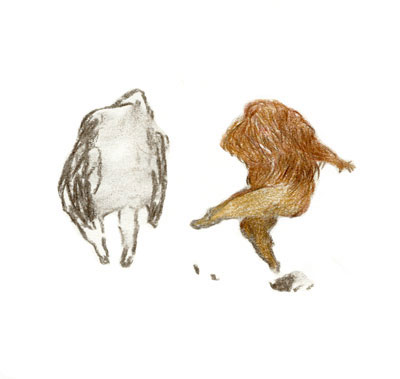
Marine Joatton, Dessin technique mixte

Marine Joatton (born 1972) is a contemporary French artist.

== Biography ==
Marine Joatton was born in Paris in 1972. She received a diploma from the Institut d'Etudes Politiques in Paris when she was 20 years old, but then decided to pursue a career in art. In 1995, she started a course of studies at Duncan of Jordanstone College of Art in Dundee, Scotland, UK. Ecole Nationale Supérieure des Beaux-Arts de Paris (Ensb-a). From there, she obtained a diploma in 2001. Starting 2004, she had her own exhibitions.

== Art ==
Marine Joatton started her artwork with the creation of "monsters", about 200 sculptures made from organic materials which she subsequently painted.

Starting 2002, she focused entirely on painting, starting with small formats of about 30x30cm. Since about 2004, she has been painting bigger formats (114x150).

== Main exhibitions ==
- 2013 : Spontaneous Generation, Gallery 604 (Busan)
- 2011 : Faire ventre de tout, espace d'art contemporain Camille Lambert (Juvisy-sur-Orge)
- 2009 : La contemplation de la flaque, galerie Eric Dupont (Paris)
- 2008 : Venir à bout des taupes, galerie Eric Dupont (Paris)
- 2006 : Un monde retourné, galerie Claude Samuel (Paris)
- 2004 : Les Encombrants, galerie du Haut-Pavé (Paris)
- 2004 : Bête, galerie d'Art de Créteil (Créteil)

== Works in public collections ==
- 2008 : Fonds régional d'art contemporain de Picardie (FRAC Picardie)
- 2005 : Fonds national d'art contemporain (FNAC)

== Works in private collections ==
- 2010 : Fondation Salomon pour l'art contemporain
- 2008 : Fondation Colas
