= Travis Bickle =

Protagonist of the film Taxi Driver

- Robert De Niro as Travis Bickle in Taxi Driver
- First appearance: Taxi Driver (1976)
- Last appearance: Before Watchmen (2012)
- Created by: Paul Schrader
- Portrayed by: Robert De Niro

In-universe information
- Alias: Henry Krinkle
- Nicknames: Cowboy, Killer
- Occupation: U.S. Marine (formerly) Taxicab driver
- Nationality: American

Travis Bickle is the antihero protagonist of the 1976 film Taxi Driver directed by Martin Scorsese. The character was created by the film's screenwriter Paul Schrader. He is portrayed by Robert De Niro, who received Academy Award, BAFTA Award, and Golden Globe nominations for Best Lead Actor for his performance.

== Biography ==
Travis Bickle is a 26-year-old living in New York City. When applying for a job as a taxi driver, he says he is a former U.S. Marine who served in the Vietnam War and was given an honorable discharge in May 1973, and has had "some" education. With few friends, and suffering from depression, loneliness, existential crises, and severe and chronic insomnia, he takes a job as a graveyard shift cab driver to occupy his time, working grueling 12–14 hour shifts 6–7 days a week. Working late at night in dangerous neighborhoods, his customers tend to include pimps and drug addicts. He is visibly angered by them, and begins fantasizing about "cleansing" such "filth" from the streets.

Bickle becomes attracted to a woman, Betsy (Cybill Shepherd), who works in the local campaign office of presidential candidate and United States Senator Charles Palantine. Bickle often spies on Betsy from his cab, and finally enters the office to ask her out. They meet for coffee, and Betsy finds him strange but charming, and agrees to see him again. He then takes her to a porn theater he frequents, which disgusts her and makes her refuse to see him again.

After Betsy rejects him, Bickle becomes increasingly paranoid and starts acting out his fantasies. He buys several guns and takes to carrying them secreted about his person – taped to his limbs, for example, or in hidden spring-loaded holsters. He begins a physical training regimen which consists of doing 50 pushups and 50 pullups every morning and practices an intimidating, thuggish presence in the mirror to use on whoever challenges him. Eventually, he shaves his head into a Mohawk. He attends one of Palantine's speeches, apparently intent on shooting him. However, he attracts the notice of Secret Service agents and flees.

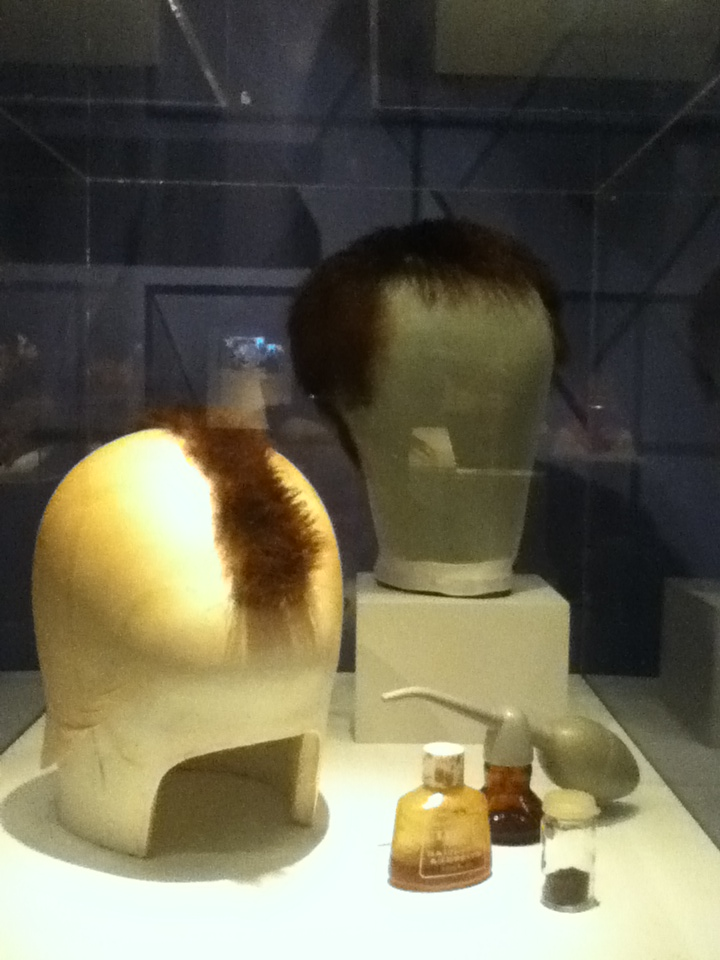
De Niro's wig from Taxi Driver

He later becomes obsessed with protecting Iris Steensma (Jodie Foster), a 12-year-old prostitute he has seen on his route. He pays her pimp, Matthew "Sport" Higgins (Harvey Keitel), for her time, but is not interested in having sex with her; instead, he tries to persuade her to leave prostitution and return home. Iris rebuffs him, only increasing his anger and resolve to take her away from a perilous life. He confronts Sport and shoots him in the stomach, leaving him to die on the street. He then goes on a rampage through a brothel with his concealed weapons while Iris is servicing a client. Bickle shoots the approaching bouncer's hand off as soon as he walks in, but he in turn is shot in the neck from behind by a dying Sport.

Bickle begins to advance only to have the wounded bouncer attack him while going up the stairs. Iris' client, a Mafioso, overhears the previous gunshots; he sneaks up behind the distracted Bickle and shoots him in the arm. Bickle kills the mafioso and the bouncer, and then turns the gun on himself, but finds that he is out of ammunition. Severely injured, Bickle collapses on Iris' couch as she is seen crying. When the police arrive, Bickle stares at them and smiles, pointing his bloodied finger like a gun at his head.

The newspapers hail Bickle as a hero for rescuing Iris. While in hospital, he receives a letter from her parents, thanking him for returning their daughter to them; she had been sent home after the police arrived and found out she was a runaway. After recovering he sees Betsy, who tells him that she read about him in the news; when she gets out of the cab and asks him how much the ride costs, he smiles and drives away.

== Critical response and analysis ==
Taxi Driver, American Gigolo, Light Sleeper, and The Walker make up a series referred to variously as the "Man in a Room" or "Night Worker" movies. Screenwriter Paul Schrader (who directed the other three films) has stated that he considers the central characters of the four films to be one character, who has changed as he has gotten older.

De Niro received a nomination for the Academy Award for Best Actor for his performance as Bickle. In the American Film Institute's AFI's 100 Years...100 Heroes & Villains, Bickle was named the 30th greatest film villain of all time. Empire magazine also ranked him 18th in their "The 100 Greatest Movie Characters" poll. Premiere ranked De Niro's performance as the 42nd best in cinematic history.

== Cultural influence ==
=== You talkin' to me? ===
The character has often been referenced in popular culture due to his famous "You talkin' to me?" monologue. The scene was listed by IGN as the 4th best moment in film history when counting their top 100. Bickle sinisterly utters the line while he stands in front of the mirror, clad in a USMC jacket, threatening his unseen foes with the gun up his sleeve. The line has been parodied multiple times throughout film history, including by De Niro himself in the film The Adventures of Rocky and Bullwinkle. The line can also sometimes be heard in the famous game Grand Theft Auto III when the player tries to steal a taxi by forcing the driver out.

=== John Hinckley Jr. ===
On March 30, 1981, John Hinckley Jr. attempted to assassinate United States president Ronald Reagan in an attempt to impress the actress Jodie Foster, who played Iris in Taxi Driver. Hinckley's inspirations for his assassination attempt were directly linked to Travis Bickle's attempted assassination of Charles Palantine in the film, with Hinckley even fashioning his appearance to resemble Bickle's mohawk and army jacket. Bickle's character was inspired by Arthur Bremer, who attempted to assassinate presidential candidate George Wallace on May 15, 1972. Upon hearing of Hinckley's assassination attempt, Taxi Driver director Martin Scorsese considered quitting the film industry.

=== Contemporary art ===
Several contemporary artists have directly referenced and appropriated Travis Bickle and Taxi Driver in their artwork. These include Douglas Gordon in his video installation 'Through a looking glass' (1999), which features the well-known scene in which Bickle asks, "You talkin' to me?" while gazing into a mirror. In Gordon's piece, the scene is projected onto large dual screens placed on opposite walls of a gallery space and plays on a continual loop. This artwork can be seen in the collection of the Guggenheim Museum, New York. The art duo Beagles & Ramsay created an artwork titled We Are The People – Suck On This (ICA, London 2000), which featured a video based on re-staged, downbeat version of Taxi Driver. Ramsay was dressed and styled to appear like Travis Bickle, complete with mohawk, and handed a petition into the British Prime Minister Tony Blair at 10 Downing Street. This artwork can be seen in the Glasgow Museums Collection and includes the petition which reads We Are The People – Suck On This, which is signed only by the two artists.

=== Joker ===
Todd Phillips' 2019 film Joker pays tribute to Travis Bickle and Taxi Driver through the character of Arthur Fleck (played by Joaquin Phoenix). The character's descent into madness and chaos was seen as reminiscent of Bickle, leaving many critics and audiences to speculate whether the character was an homage to Bickle or simply the use of familiar storylines. The film further references the character by having Robert De Niro play the character of Murray Franklin, a talk-show host pivotal in Arthur Fleck's descent into madness and subsequent transformation into The Joker. De Niro's casting was also a reference to another collaboration between him and Scorsese with their 1983 film The King of Comedy and his character Rupert Pupkin. The film includes a visual reference to Bickle miming shooting himself in the head in a scene in an elevator between Arthur and his neighbour, Sophie (Zazie Beetz). Sophie mentions how much she hates living in the apartment block and mimes shooting herself in the head, which Arthur does as well.

=== Music ===
Australian band The Scientists song 'If its the last thing I do' opens with the line 'Sometimes I feel like Travis Bickle and just want to shoot up all the bad lurking in this town'

The Clash song "Red Angel Dragnet" on the 1982 album Combat Rock references Travis Bickle and directly quotes or paraphrases some of his lines from the movie.

Henry Rollins emulates Travis Bickle in the music video for "Disconnect", from Rollins Band's 1994 album, Weight.

Punk rock band Rancid recorded a song called "Travis Bickle", which was released on their 2003 studio album Indestructible.

Metalcore band Emmure also recorded a song called "Travis Bickle", which was released on their 2007 studio album Goodbye to the Gallows.

Hip-hop artist Prime Minister Pete Nice mentions Travis Bickle in a lyric of the song "Blowin' Smoke" on the Dust to Dust album.

Alternative musician Rusty Cage recreated scenes as Travis Bickle in the music video for the 2018 song "The Grave".

=== Other ===
In the season 4 episode of Oz titled "A Town without Pity", Clayton Hughes dresses in the look of Bickle, complete with the haircut and tries to kill Governor James Devlin.

In the 1990 film Look Who's Talking Too, John Travolta's character refers to another as "Travis Bickle" during an argument with Kirstie Alley.

The limo driver character in the 2003 Comedy Central film Windy City Heat is named Travis Bickle.

Travis Bickle made a cameo appearance during the third issue of the 2012 comic book Before Watchmen: Rorschach, written by Brian Azzarello and illustrated by Lee Bermejo.

Bickle's "finger gun" was also referenced in season 1 of FX horror television series American Horror Story in the scene where the police attempt to arrest Tate Langdon after he commits a mass shooting. Tate mimes the finger gun to his head, resulting in the police opening fire, killing him.

Natasha Lyonne's Russian Doll references Bickle in season 2, episode 1, at the 7:36 mark, with her character Nadia Vulvokov speaking the line, "Hey, Travis Bickle, what year do you think it is, man?"

One of the "Elite Bundle" skin sets in Tom Clancy's Rainbow Six: Siege partially references Travis Bickle's signature mohawk and sunglasses.

In Eden of the East the unnamed male protagonist looks at himself in a mirror holding a gun and states that it reminds him of Taxi Driver.

In season one, episode two of the series Lilyhammer, the main character, American gangster Frank Tagliano, refers to a Norwegian taxi driver as Travis Bickle.
