= Morag Henriksen =

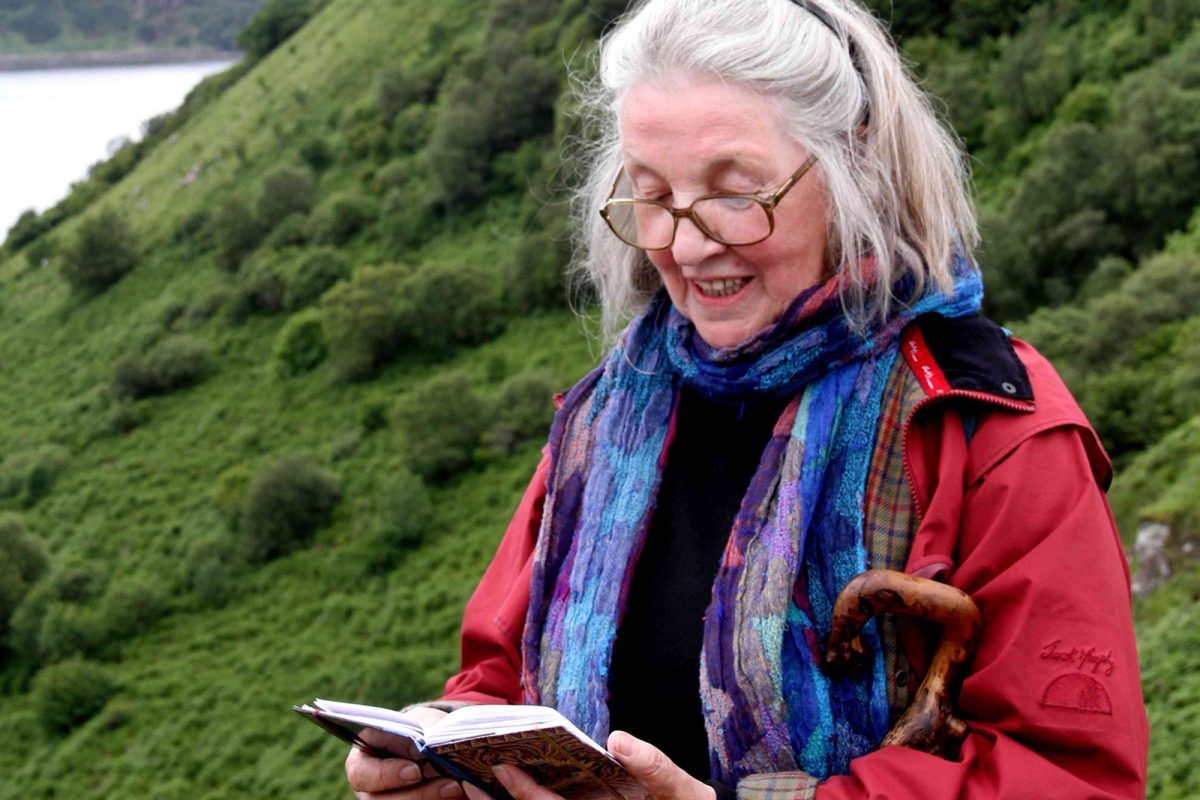
- Born: Morag MacIver Ross; July 1941; Lochcarron, Wester Ross, Scotland
- Known for: Author, poet, singer and teacher
- Notable work: Sing around Scotland, Scenery of Dreams, Tapestry of Scenes

Morag Henriksen describes herself as a Highlander born and bred. Growing up in Lochcarron, where her father was the headmaster of the local school, she developed a life long love of Gaidhlig culture, folk music, singing, story telling and poetry and this informed her later work as a writer.

== Early life ==
Morag MacIver Ross was born in Inverness in the Highlands of Scotland in July 1941. Her father was a strict Free Presbyterian and attended The Free Presbyterian Church in Lochcarron. She studied at the University of Edinburgh and went on to qualify as a teacher at Moray House in 1964. Her first teaching position was held at Drumbrae Primary School. She married Harry Henriksen in 1966.

== Career ==
After their time in Edinburgh, they moved to Portree on the Isle of Skye in 1967. Morag Henriksen started teaching at Portree High School in 1976 before becoming the head teacher at Uig Primary School, where she taught for ten years. During her time at Uig Primary School, she was integral in developing shinty in Skye primary schools. As a primary school teacher in the Isle of Skye in 1985, she was selected to put together a collection of 48 songs from every region of Scotland to form the educational musical resource Sing Around Scotland, produced by Ward Lock Educational. The piano arrangements were by Barrie Carson Turner and illustrations by Harry Henriksen. In 1989, she developed ME and retired from teaching in 1994.

== Creative practice ==
Morag Henriksen performed in the first production by the Uiseag Theatre Group in 1999 at Aros, Portree, Isle of Skye. The play, Cuimhneachadh Mairi Mhor (Remembering Mairi Mhor) told the story of the famous Skye bard Mairi Mhor nan Oran. Morag Henriksen was the script writer and co-producer along with Sylvia Ladlow. The play was performed again on 20 September 2007 at Aros, Portree, Isle of Skye. The event was part-funded by the National Lottery which provided an award of £3,600.

Henriksen's book Scenery of Dreams was launched at the Skye Book Festival in 2014. The book includes a collection of stories from her early childhood. Her third book, Tapestry of Scenes, was in the Skye Book Festival in 2016.

Henriksen was part of the research for ATLAS Arts' project Ragadawn and participated in the artist Caroline Bergvall's language station at Sabhal Mòr Ostaig in 2017, which became part of the final work performed in August 2018.

== Publications ==
=== Books ===
- Sing Around Scotland (1985) Ward Lock Educational
- Tapestry of Scenes (2016) Adelaide Independent Reporter
- Scenery of Dreams (2014) Adelaide Independent Reporter
