= Anna Martin =

Anna Martin may refer to:

- Anna Maxwell Martin (born 1978), English actress
- Anna Mebus Martin (1843–1925), American businesswoman and bank president
- Anna Martin, character in Unreal (TV series)
- Ana Martín, Mexican actress

== See also ==
- Ann Martin (disambiguation)
