= Niall Macdonald =

Scottish visual artist

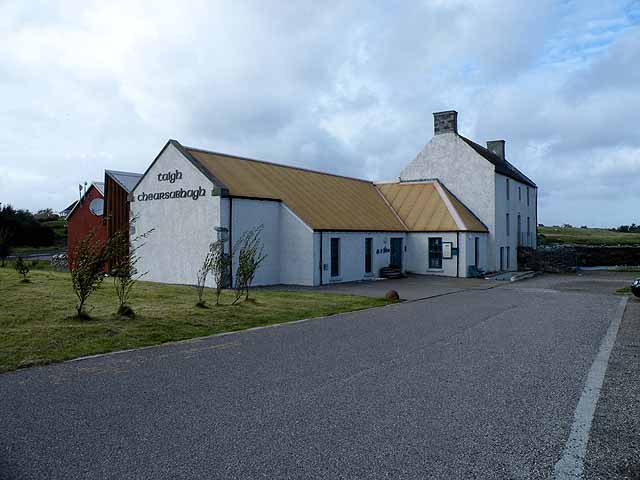
- Born: 1980 (age 45–46); North Uist
- Education: Glasgow School of Art

Niall Macdonald (born 1980) is a Scottish visual artist. He graduated in 2008 from the Glasgow School of Art.

== Biography ==
Macdonald was born in 1980 in North Uist in the Outer Hebrides of Scotland. He received his Master of Fine Art from the Glasgow School of Art in 2008. Macdonald is represented by Koppe Astner (previously Kendall Koppe).

== Exhibitions ==
Niall Macdonald has exhibited nationally and internationally.

- Taigh Chearsabhagh. Lochmaddy, Outer Hebrides, Scotland - November 2017
- Kendall Koppe (now Koppe Astner) - The Ultimate Vessel - 20 Nov 2015 - 8 Jan 2016
- Tramway, Glasgow, Scotland - 2012
