= Moyna Flannigan =

Scottish artist

Moyna Flannigan (born 1963) is a Scottish artist working primarily in drawing, collage and painting.

Flannigan is best known for her imagined paintings of women in psychologically charged situations. "The real subject of my paintings is space, both physical and psychological. [...] Space in a painting is not simply an environment for action; it’s a place with formal relationships that have inherent hidden meaning."

== Education and teaching ==
Flannigan was born in Kirkcaldy in 1963. She obtained a Bachelor of Arts from Edinburgh College of Art in 1985 and a Master of Fine Art from Yale University School of Art, New Haven, Connecticut in 1987. Formerly a lecturer in painting at Glasgow School of Art (1995 - 2005), Flannigan was a teaching fellow at Edinburgh College of Art, University of Edinburgh (2015–2019).

== Influences ==
The Glasgow Herald in 2014, at the time of her Generations show, Flannigan discussed drawing inspiration from the work of surrealist sculptor Alberto Giacometti. His work Femme égorgée (Woman With Her Throat Cut) "fed its way into her subconscious". She has also drawn inspiration from the 1979 art film, Stalker, directed by Andrei Tarkovsky, and from Masaccio's masterly 15th-century fresco, Expulsion From The Garden Of Eden in the Brancacci Chapel, Florence, which she visited as part of her residency at the British School at Rome.

While Giacometti's 1932 bronze, is "a worrying human-insect hybrid, a splayed, disembowelled figure part praying mantis, part crime victim, Flannigan turns up the volume of Giacometti's angst-ridden attitude to the female form; her own painted figures echo his sculpture's splayed structure, but are defiantly, terrifyingly alive with their blood red lips and stiletto heels".

== Exhibitions ==
=== Solo exhibitions ===
- Girl With Tear, A-M-G5, Glasgow, 2019
- Tear, NOW, Scottish National Gallery of Modern Art Edinburgh, 2018–19
- earth sky body, Gimpel Fils, London, 2015
- white heart beating, Galerie Akinci, Amsterdam, 2015
- Stare, part of GENERATION: 25 Years of Contemporary Art in Scotland, Gallery of Modern Art, Glasgow, 2014
- The Body Stretches to the Edge, Galerie Akinci, Amsterdam, 2013
- New Work by Moyna Flannigan – What you see is where you’re at, Part 3, Scottish National Gallery of Modern Art Edinburgh
- Trouble Loves Me, Sara Meltzer Gallery, New York, 2009
- Sphinx, Sara Meltzer Gallery, New York, 2008
- Moyna Flannigan: A footprint in the hall, Mount Stuart Visual Arts Programme, Mount Stuart, Isle of Bute, Scotland
- Well, well, doggerfisher, Edinburgh, 2006
- Poke, Galerie Akinci, Amsterdam, 2006
- A Pie in the Kisser, Sara Meltzer Gallery, New York, 2005
- Once upon our time: Portrait Miniatures by Moyna Flannigan, Scottish National Portrait Gallery, Edinburgh, 2004
- Knucklehead, Sara Meltzer Gallery, New York, 2003
- I'm a stranger here myself, doggerfisher, Edinburgh, Scotland, 2002
- I think about it almost all the time, Sara Meltzer Gallery, New York, 2002
- I could be happy with you, Gallery Akinci, Amsterdam, 2001
- Gallery Albrecht, Munich, Germany, 2000
- Lotta Hammer Gallery, London, 1998
- The British School at Rome, 1997
- CCA, Centre for Contemporary Art, Glasgow, 1996

=== Selected group exhibitions ===
- Cute Carnival curated by Rachel Maclean, Birmingham City Art Gallery, 2019
- Mirrors: when we hunt reality and hang its skin upon our walls, A-M-G5, Glasgow, 2019
- Where the f*ck is my sock, Galerie Akinci, Amsterdam 2017
- The Female Gaze, Pallant House Gallery, Chicester, 2017
- Face 2 Face, Torre Abbey Museum, Torquay, 2017
- Paper Trail: Drawings|Watercolours|Prints, City Art Centre, Edinburgh, 2017
- INK: Public Archive - Five Decades of Printmaking at The Glasgow Print Studio, Glasgow, UK, 2017
- That Which Remains, Mount Stuart, Isle of Bute, Scotland, 2016
- now now, Andrew Cranston, Moyna Flannigan, Graeme Todd, West Barns Arts, Dunbar, Scotland, 2016
- Drawing on Drawing, Andrew Grant Gallery, Edinburgh College of Art, University of Edinburgh, 2016
- Face to Face: British Portrait Prints from the Clifford Chance Collection, Sir John Soane's Museum, London, 2014
- The Miniature Museum, Gemeentemmuseum Den Haag, Netherlands, 2013
- Collectors' Choice, Royal Scottish Academy, Edinburgh, 2013
- Dressed To Kill, City Art Centre, Edinburgh, 2013
- Teasers, Selected Works from the Pizzuti Collection by Women Artists, Pizzuti Collection, Columbus, Ohio, USA, 2012
- Pincushion, a Polarcap Exhibition, John Gray Centre, Haddington, Scotland, 2012
- Twisted Sister, Dodge Gallery, New York, 2012
- A Parliament of Lines, City Art Centre, Edinburgh, Scotland, 2012
- To Have a Voice, Mackintosh Gallery, Glasgow School of Art, Scotland, 2012
- VANHUIT HIER – OUT OF HERE: The Collectors Show, Van Abbe Museum, Eindhoven, Netherlands 2011
- Melting Point, Galerie Akinci, Amsterdam, 2011
- Playboy Redux: Contemporary Artists Interpret the Iconic Playboy Bunny, The Andy Warhol Museum, Pittsburgh, USA, 2010
- Moyna Flannigan/Julie Roberts, Galerie Akinci, Amsterdam, Netherlands, 2009
- What you see is where you're at: Part 1, Scottish National Gallery of Modern Art, Edinburgh, 2009
- Strike A Pose, Stephen Friedman Gallery, London, 2009
- Moyna Flannigan, Isabel Nolan, Hanneline Visnes, doggerfisher, Edinburgh, UK, 2009
- The Fool, Northern Gallery of Contemporary Art, Sunderland, UK, 2009
- Summer Exhibition 2009, (Invited Artist), Royal Academy of Arts, London, 2009
- Maternity: Images of Motherhood, Scottish National Gallery of Modern Art, Edinburgh, 2008
- Out of Shape: Stylistic Distortions of the Human Form in Art from the Logan Collection, The Frances Lehman Loeb Art Center, Vassar College, USA, 2008
- Welcome Home, Sara Meltzer Gallery, New York, 2006
- Moyna Flannigan, Gerben Mulder, Albrecht Schnider, Andrei Roiter, Galerie Akinci, Amsterdam, 2004
- The Birthday Party, Collective Gallery, Edinburgh, 2004
- The Drawing Project, Vamiali's Gallery, Athens, 2004
- Solar Lunar, doggerfisher, Edinburgh, 2004
- Rendered, Sara Meltzer Gallery, New York, 2003
- The Company We Keep, Inman Gallery, Houston, Texas, 2003
- Moyna Flannigan, Gerben Mulder, Elke Krystufek, Ronald Versloot, Galerie Akinci, Amsterdam, 2003
- Love Over Gold: Works from the Collection of the Scottish National Gallery of Modern Art, Gallery of Modern Art, Glasgow, 2003
- New, Green On Red Gallery, Dublin, Ireland, 2002
- New: Recent Acquisitions of Contemporary British Art, Scottish National Gallery of Modern Art, Edinburgh, 2002
- Beuys to Hirst: Art Works at the Deutsche Bank, Dean Gallery, Edinburgh, 2001
- Here and Now: Scottish Art 1990-2001, DCA, Dundee, Scotland, 2001
- Open Country: Contemporary Scottish Artists, Musáe cantonal des Beaux-Arts de Lausanne, Switzerland, 2001
- Annäherung an das Portrait: Moyna Flannigan, Konrad Klapheck & Monica Castillo, Galerie Albrecht, Munich, 2000
- Moyna Flannigan & Chantal Joffe, Galerie Akinci, Amsterdam, 2000

== Selected publications and reviews ==
2007 Crichton Stuart, Anthony. Moyna Flannigan: An Intervention at Mount Stuart, Mount Stuart Visual Arts Programme, Isle of Bute [catalogue]

2006 Dannatt, Adrian. Moyna Flannigan Paintings 1998–2006. Edinburgh. Doggerfisher [catalogue]

2006 Clark, Robert. "Moyna Flannigan, Edinburgh." The Guardian, August 19: 36

2005 Monaghan, Helen. "New York, Moyna Flannigan, Sara Meltzer Gallery 7 Apr - 14 May, MAP, Issue 2/Summer 2005

2004 Lapham, Lewis. "Moyna Flannigan", Harper's Magazine, November, p. 23

2004 Boyce, Martin. "Moyna Flannigan" Scotland on Sunday, Critics' Choice, May 9

2004 Hartley, Keith. "Once upon our time: Portrait Miniatures by Moyna Flannigan", The National Galleries of Scotland, Edinburgh [catalogue]

2003 Herbert, Martin. "Moyna Flannigan", Frieze Art Fair Yearbook 2003, London [catalogue]

2003 Chambers, Christopher. "Moyna Flannigan," FlashArt, July–September, p. 67

2002 Mulholland, Neil. "Moyna Flannigan," FlashArt, November–December

2001Tufnell, Rob and Katrina M. Brown, Here and Now: Scottish Art 1990–2001, DCA, Dundee [catalogue]

2001 Nicod, Caroline, et al. Open Country - Scotland: Contemporary Scottish Artists, Musee cantonal des Beaux-Arts de Lausanne, Switzerland [catalogue]

2001 Hartley, Keith. Locale, City Art Centre, Edinburgh [catalogue]

1999 Marlow, Tim. The NatWest Art Prize 1999, Lothbury Gallery, London [catalogue]

1997 Mania, Patrizia. Fine Art Scholars 1997, British Art School at Rome [catalogue]

1996 Kingston, Angela. Moyna Flannigan, Centre for Contemporary Art, Glasgow [catalogue]
