= Euan Heng =

Scottish-born Australian artist (born 1945)

- Born: 1945 (age 80–81); Oban, Argyllshire, Scotland
- Known for: Painting, drawing, printmaking
- Awards: The Australian Council for University Art and Design Schools Distinguished Research Award, 2004

Euan Heng (born 1945) is a Scottish-born Australian artist.

== Life and work ==
Between 1960 and 1970, he was employed in various occupations, including four years as a merchant seaman travelling the world. He received a Diploma in Art and a Post Diploma from Duncan of Jordanstone College of Art in Dundee, Scotland and Masters in Research from RMIT, in Melbourne. Other activities of the artist have included teaching at Clackmannan College of Further Education (now Forth Valley College) in Scotland, Monash University, Prato Centre in Italy and he is currently an Adjunct Associate Professor in Fine Art at Monash University, Melbourne. When describing his work, Heng explains his process of emptying out his paintings, "no vulgar brush strokes and no detail to distract – just gently modulated pigment to activate flat shapes of colour. I want the visual response to my new paintings to be rapid, if possible, after which the viewer, should he or she wish, can invest further time in unpacking the content, or in discovering the paintings' secrets. By seeking this pictorial suddenness, formally speaking my aim is to avoid the 'expressionistic', and to privilege instead the flatness of the painting's surface". While Heng's work is contemporary in practice his imagery is not always contemporary in origin. He has long been influenced by Italian iconography, medieval paintings and frescoes, and 16th century Mogul art. Heng has been able to spend considerable time in Italy, thanks to his teaching post at the Prato Centre, and aspects of the country's art and landscape have crept into his work.

== Exhibitions ==
Since 1973, Heng has held 35 solo exhibitions in Australia, Italy and Scotland and has participated in over 70 curated and juried group exhibitions in Australia and internationally, including the UK, North America, Europe and Asia. Shows include Reading the Space: Contemporary Australian Drawing #3 at New York Studio School in the US and Interlude Suspended at Niagara Galleries in Melbourne. He has participated in the Auckland Art Fair and Melbourne Art Fair representing Niagara Galleries and Boutwell Draper Gallery, Sydney and the Drawing Biennale at Drill Hall Gallery in Canberra.

== Collections ==
Heng's work is represented in major private and corporate collections, as well as public and university museum collections in all states of Australia including the National Gallery of Australia, National Gallery of Victoria, Art Gallery of New South Wales and the Queensland Art Gallery. Internationally, Heng's work appears in the collections of Hunterian Museum & Art Gallery and Stirling University, both in Scotland. Additionally, illustrated essays, articles and reviews on his work have been published in all major Australian newspapers and recognised art press, including Art Forum International, USA, Asian Art news, Art and Australia and Art Monthly Australia.

== Awards ==
Heng has participated in visiting artist/lectureships and residences in Australia and overseas including, in 1999, the Australia Council Residency at the British School at Rome. In 2004, he received the Australian Council for University Art and Design Schools Distinguished Research Award. In 2010, he was the recipient of a Residencies for Scotland Programme, awarded by the Royal Scottish Academy.
