= GENERATION: 25 Years of Contemporary Art in Scotland =

GENERATION: 25 Years of Contemporary Art in Scotland was a nationwide exhibition programme held in Scotland in 2014 showcasing the work of contemporary Scottish artists.

The programme traced the developments in art in Scotland since 1989. It featured over 100 artists in more than 60 venues. The art that emerged from Scotland during this period is characterised by its diversity, rather than by one particular style or dominant trend.

GENERATION was delivered as a partnership between the National Galleries of Scotland, Glasgow Life and Creative Scotland and is part of Culture 2014, the Glasgow 2014 Cultural Programme.

== Artists involved ==
- Charles Avery
- Beagles & Ramsay
- Karla Black
- Christine Borland
- Martin Boyce
- Roderick Buchanan
- Duncan Campbell
- Steven Campbell
- Paul Carter
- Nathan Coley
- Alan Currall
- Dalziel + Scullion
- Moyna Flannigan
- Alec Finlay
- Luke Fowler
- Michael Fullerton
- Douglas Gordon
- Ellie Harrison
- Louise Hopkins
- Kenny Hunter
- Callum Innes
- Jim Lambie
- Lucy McKenzie
- Wendy McMurdo
- Alan Michael
- Jonathan Monk
- Rosalind Nashashibi
- Katie Paterson
- Ciara Phillips
- David Sherry
- David Shrigley
- Lucy Skaer
- Simon Starling
- Sue Tompkins
- Hanna Tuulikki
- Alison Watt
- Cathy Wilkes
- Richard Wright

== Participating galleries and arts organisations ==
- Aberdeen Art Gallery
- An Lanntair
- ATLAS Arts
- Centre for Contemporary Arts
- Dundee Contemporary Arts
- Dick Institute
- Dovecot Studios
- Duff House
- Edinburgh Art Festival
- Glasgow Print Studio
- Glasgow Women's Library
- Gallery of Modern Art
- Gracefield Arts Centre
- House for an Art Lover
- Inverleith House
- Inverness Museum and Art Gallery
- Kelvingrove Art Gallery and Museum
- Mount Stuart House
- National Galleries of Scotland
- People's Palace
- Paxton House
- Perth Art Gallery
- Pier Arts Centre
- Riverside Museum
- Royal Scottish Academy
- Talbot Rice Gallery
- The Fruitmarket Gallery
- Tramway
