= William Johnstone (artist) =

Scottish artist and writer (1897–1981)

William Johnstone OBE (1897–1981) was a Scottish artist and writer, and Principal of Central School of Arts and Crafts from 1947 to 1960.

== Life ==
Johnstone was born in 1897 in Denholm in the Scottish Borders and grew up to a farming family. After the First World War he gave up the life of a farmer to go to Edinburgh College of Art. Here he met the poet Hugh MacDiarmid who shared many of his political and artistic ideals. Together they formed the concept of the Scottish Renaissance to release the nation from its cultural poverty under a centralised British arts scene.

Johnstone travelled to Paris in his youth, which opened him to the ideas of modernism. He also spent time in the US, where he became interested in Native American cave paintings for their deemed naïve simplicity.

During World War II Johnstone became culturally despondent, turning away from practising art to become a teacher, a role which occupied much of his professional life. In 1938 until 1945 he served as the Principal of the Camberwell School of Art and Crafts in London. And later, in 1947, was appointed as Principal of the Central School of Arts and Crafts. Johnstone was noted for his recruitment of a new teaching staff of fine artists which included the painters Mary Kessell (b. 1914) and Richard Hamilton, brought in to assist at the School of Silversmithing and Jewellery. Johnstone played an important and pioneering role in his teaching and promoting of 'Basic Design principles'—which he had developed from his contacts with the Bauhaus— at both the Camberwell and Central Schools.

He became renowned as a teacher, creating innovative courses and employment in teaching for such important artists as Alan Davie and Eduardo Paolozzi. In 1954 Johnstone's significant contributions to art education saw him awarded an Order of the British Empire. In 1960, Johnstone retired and left the Central School to return home to the Borders to work as a farmer and a painter. This was to be his most prolific period as an artist.

== Art ==
Johnstone's work was directly related to modernism, moving away from direct representation to abstraction. Central to his work was the materiality of paint and its formal attributes. This was heavily influenced by the work of the Abstract Expressionists in America. Also, key was the notion of the unconscious, as inspired by Surrealism.

Johnstone's work also took on a very personal relationship with the landscape of his native land of the Scottish borders. In this landscape he saw the tension between humanity and nature. Despite his abstract tendencies, Johnstone's work still retained a physical sense of the visual world. This is demonstrated in his most celebrated painting A Point in Time 1929–1937 now owned by the National Galleries of Scotland.

Johnstone's work is found in several major UK public collections including the Tate Gallery, the Government Art Collection, The Fleming Collection and the Dundee Art Galleries and Museums Collections.
