= Ceara Conway =

Irish artist and singer

- Born: 1977 (age 48–49)
- Education: Edinburgh College of Art & NCAD
- Occupations: Visual artist, Singer
- Website: https://www.cearaconway.ie

Ceara Conway (born 1977) is an independent Irish contemporary visual artist and vocalist from the Connemara Gaeltacht region in County Galway, in the west of Ireland.

== Biography ==
Conway has a BA in Glass and Architectural Glass from Edinburgh College of Art and studied Community & Public Arts Education at the National College of Art and Design and Glass & Photography at Alfred University, New York.

=== Work ===
She has been commissioned by art organisations and public institutions such as CREATE, Galway European Capital of Culture, Saolta Arts & Galway University Hospitals, Galway Public Arts Office, Ormston House, Waterways Ireland, Difference Exchange (UK), King's College (UK) and Atlas Arts (UK).

Along with her commissioned work, she performs nationally and internationally for prolific events, festivals & visiting heads of state. She has performed with musicians such as Nick Roth, Caoimhin O Raghallaigh, Noirin Ni Rian, Linda Buckley and LAU. She is currently working on an album with producer and musician Sean Mac Erlaine.

=== Selected works ===
- Making Visible, Funded by CREATE and supported by the Arts Council, 2015
- Say Goodbye, Commissioned by Verbal Arts Centre, Ulster Museum and curated by Declan Sheehan, 2016
- Public art installation - Five Continents One People, Creagh Primary School, Galway, 2010
- Public art installation - 15 miles, St Brendan’s Nursing Home in Loughrea, County Galway, 2013-2015
- Live performance response to The Amulet, LAB Gallery, 2015.
- Performance - Iascealaíocht, Connemara, Curated by Gregory McCartney, 2018.
- Vicissitudes, Exile Ritual and Lament and A Vessel for Souls, Derry City of Culture and King's College London, 2013.
