= Mary Kessell =

British painter

- Born: November 13, 1914; London
- Died: 1977 (aged 62–63)
- Education: Clapham School of Art; Central School of Arts and Crafts
- Occupation: Artist
- Spouse: Tom Eckersley

Mary Merlin Kessell (13 November 1914 – 1977) was a British figurative painter, illustrator, designer and war artist. Born in London, she studied at the Clapham School of Art, then later at the Central School of Arts and Crafts. At the end of the Second World War, she was commissioned to work in Germany as an official British war artist; one of only three women selected. She spent six weeks in Germany, travelling to the recently liberated Bergen-Belsen concentration camp as well as other major cities including Berlin. She produced charcoal drawings of refugees, primarily of women and children which she subsequently sold to the War Artists Advisory Committee. After the war Kessell collaborated with the Needlework Development Scheme, NDS, to produce experimental designs for machine and hand embroidery as well as working for Shell as a designer. She later returned to the Central School to teach at the School of Silversmithing and Jewellery alongside the painter Richard Hamilton.

== Early career ==
Kessell was born on 13 November 1914 in London. She began her artistic training at the Clapham School of Art, where she studied from 1935 to 1937, then at the Central School of Arts and Crafts from 1937 to 1939. Throughout her time as a student she illustrated books, one of which was Miss Kimber by Osbert Sitwell in 1937.

== War artist ==
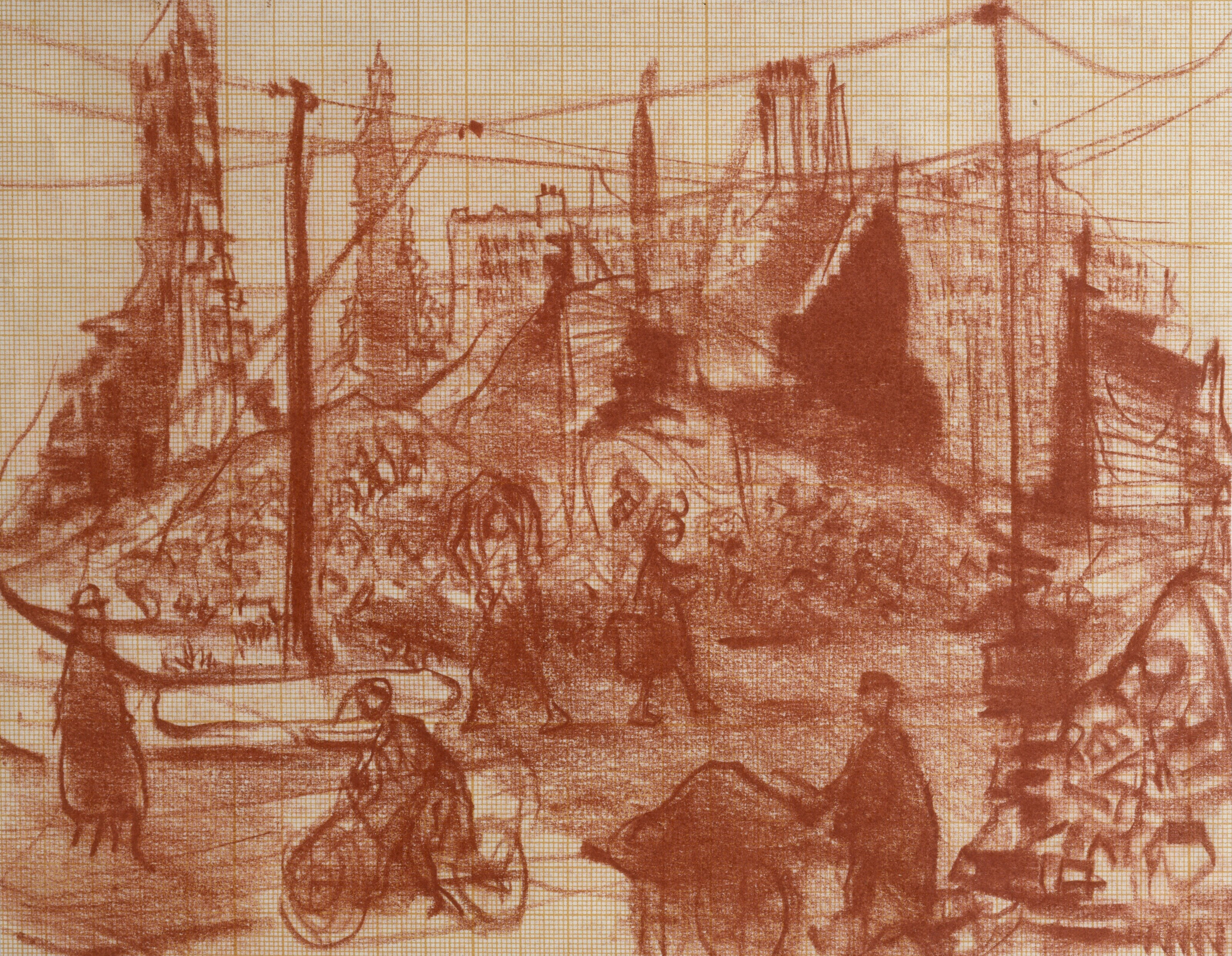
Ruins in Hamburg: The Dock Area (1945) (Art.IWM ART LD 5745a)

During the end of the Second World War, Kessell was based in Germany having been commissioned by the War Artists Advisory Committee, WAAC, as an official British war artist. Just three female war artists worked abroad during World War II; as one of them, Kessell was asked to document refugees "moving through Europe in the aftermath of the German surrender". She spent six weeks in Germany, from 9 August 1945 to 20 September, where she made charcoal drawings of refugees as well as keeping a diary of her experiences.

Kessell's first destination was the Bergen-Belsen concentration camp, which had been liberated by Allied forces four months previously. She arrived later than the other war artists, including Doris Zinkeisen, Edgar Ainsworth and Eric Taylor, who had visited the camp immediately after its liberation. By the time Kessell arrived, the remaining camp buildings had been destroyed and former inmates were being transferred to the nearby displaced persons camp. Convoys for the camp survivors to return to their home countries were being organized and Kessell witnessed a number of these departures. This had a distinct effect on the work she produced. At Belsen, Kessell completed seven drawings in black and sanguine charcoal, which she called Notes from Belsen Camp, 1945. These were the smallest of the drawings produced during her time as a war artist. Unlike the work produced by the other artists, which often featured detailed scenes and backgrounds, Kessell's subjects are entirely removed from any sense of background. The subject themselves, primarily women and children, are drawn as "detail-less bodies".

During her time in Germany, Kessell also visited Hamburg, Lübeck, Hanover, Kiel, Berlin and Potsdam also producing charcoal drawings in a similar style to those that she completed at Belsen. A diary of her time in Germany was published in the Cornhill Magazine in 1946.

== Post-war work ==
After the war, in 1947, Kessell was commissioned to complete needlework designs for the Needlework Development Scheme, a collaborative initiative between education and industry, which sought to promote and improve British embroidery design. Although the scheme had a large and current selection of embroideries in a number of styles, foreign examples represented the collection's best needlework. With the intention of expanding the number of British works, Kessell was chosen to create experimental designs for hand and machine work that could be interpreted by British embroidery artists. The designs were considered particularly "progressive" and proved difficult to reproduce. Machine results were considered more successful than those produced by hand. Although few art schools were accomplished enough to adopt the designs, Bromley College of Art was one that did manage to do so.

In 1939 Kessell painted a mural, Judith and Helofernes, for the old Westminster Hospital. In 1955 she painted Four ancient elements for Imperial Chemical House, Millbank. She worked as a designer in the Shell Studio at Shell-Mex House and produced posters for Shell (1952) and later, in 1964, for London Transport promoting Kew Gardens. Kessell exhibited some of her refugee drawings at the first of her four solo shows to be held at the Leicester Galleries in 1950. In the 1960s Oxfam commissioned Kessell to visit India to produce drawings supporting their work there. These were subsequently published, with a text by Kessell, as A Visit to India for Oxfam in 1969.

Kessell joined the staff at the Camberwell School of Arts and Crafts in 1950 and later taught at the Central School where she was brought in by the then Principal William Johnstone to teach at the School of Silversmithing and Jewellery there, alongside painter Richard Hamilton. She returned to teach at Camberwell between 1955 and 1960. Kessell's work is held in London collections including the Imperial War Museum, the Tate and the Victoria and Albert Museum. A retrospective of her work was held at the Camden Arts Centre in 1980. She was married to the poster designer Tom Eckersley.

== Books illustrated ==
- Mrs Kimber by Oswald Sitwell, Macmillen, 1937.
- Best Poems of 1937 published by Cape, 1938.
- A Sportsman's Notebook by Ivan Turgenev, 1959.
- A Visit to India for Oxfam with text by Kessell, 1969.
