= Beagles & Ramsay =

Art duo from Glasgow, Scotland

Beagles & Ramsay in their studio.

Beagles & Ramsay (John Beagles born 1970 and Graham Ramsay born 1968) are an art duo based in Glasgow, Scotland. They have worked collaboratively since 1997.

== Education and teaching ==
John Beagles studied at the Slade School of Fine Art, London and Graham Ramsay studied at the University of Leeds. Both artists then moved to Glasgow to complete their MFAs at Glasgow School of Art where they also began their collaborative practice.

Beagles teaches at Edinburgh University, and Ramsay teaches on the MFA Programme at Glasgow School of Art. Both artists have also taught at a wide variety of art schools and universities across the UK and internationally.

== Exhibitions and artworks ==
Two key interweaving currents of interest inform the work of Beagles & Ramsay. Firstly the reoccurring use of a kind of fictionalised self-portraiture and secondly, in broad terms, a humorous examination of aspects of contemporary consumer culture. Since 1997 they have explored these themes in a series of sculptures, installations, video, performance, and drawings, which have been exhibited nationally and internationally.

Their presence within the work has always been a performed presence; using doppelgangers has been a means of speaking in alternate voices or drawing upon multiple personae. Producing and inhabiting these shifting personae has allowed them the conceptual space to explore aspects of contemporary culture – such as consumerism, political disenfranchisement, and the cult of celebrity – without the restrictions of a singular, authoritative voice. 'Trilogy' (2000) has the two artists appearing as geriatric versions of themselves trapped in a series of domestic interiors whilst voicing the lyrics to well known songs by Madonna and Prince. This video has been shown in numerous venues including 'Videodrome II' at the New Museum, New York. In the ‘Glitter Desert Island’ series (Tramway, Glasgow 2005, and MOT International, London 2007) they assumed the pose and gaze of the rarefied dandy, reclining on a gold glitter desert island complete with fake palm trees, while ‘We Are The People – Suck On This’ (ICA, London 2000) featured a restaged, downbeat version of Martin Scorsese's Taxi Driver. Ramsay was dressed and styled to appear like the Taxi Driver character Travis Bickle and handed a petition into the British Prime Minister Tony Blair at 10 Downing Street.

Their 2003 solo show, 'Dead of Night' at Gasworks Gallery, London featured an ambitious theatrical installation containing a pair of hand crafted ventriloquist dummy doppelgangers. This work is also informed by research into earlier, pre-modernist traditions within art, specifically the counter tradition of the carnivalesque. The artists within this tradition were adept at synthesising their visual aesthetic with political allegories and satirical content. The influence of this tradition is perhaps most clearly seen in the ongoing series of drawings ‘Unrealised Dreams’ which were first shown in the Scottish Pavilion at the Venice Biennale 2003. This expansive collection of proposals, plans and absurd schemes are carefully rendered in the style of Leonardo da Vinci's sketchbook drawings.

‘Sanguis Gratia Artis’ (2004) was a key work that represented a step away from figurative self-representation. Commissioned by the Henry Moore Foundation and Grizedale Arts for ‘Romantic Detachment’ at MoMA PS1, New York ‘Sanguis Gratia Artis’ featured a black pudding self-portrait using Beagles & Ramsay's blood as the key ingredient. This work toured to several venues in Portugal, and the UK. In 2006 a live cooking performance at the Royal Scottish Academy was banned by Edinburgh City Council. In 2019 this work was acquired for the National Galleries of Scotland collection with support from the Art Fund.

One of their solo exhibitions, ‘Good Teeth' (Glasgow Sculpture Studios, 2008) featured a 4 × 3 metre priapic robot made from gold glitter and a 2.8m × 1.5m neon sign carrying the slogan Good Teeth.

In 2005, they were curated in the international survey exhibition 'When Humour Becomes Painful' at the Migros Museum, Zurich. This exhibition was accompanied by a catalogue with essays by Simon Critchley, Heike Munder and Slavoj Zizek. The video work shown, titled 'New Meat', was acquired for the Gallery of Modern Art/Glasgow City Museums Collection in 2010.

Beagles & Ramsay have also been included in a number of survey exhibitions of Scottish Art that include 'Divided Selves: The Scottish self-portrait from the 17th century to the present day' (2006), 'Generation: 25 years of Contemporary Art In Scotland' (2014), which was organised by the National Galleries of Scotland, and 'The Scottish Endarkenment. Art and Unreason from 1945 to the Present' (2016).

Solo exhibitions have often included combinations of video, print and sculptural elements, such as 'PINGPINGJERKSPASM' at the Pipe Factory (2017) and 'Circular Holding Pattern' Govan Project Space (2019). Most of Beagles & Ramsay's video works since 2013 have used a variety of animation techniques, including traditional stop motion and digital 3D modelling using video game software. A major solo show 'NHOTB & RAD' took place at the Gallery of Modern Art (GoMA) in October 2023 - April 2024. Their video work is distributed internationally by Vtape.

Exhibitions by Beagles & Ramsay have been reviewed in numerous journals and magazines including Artforum, Frieze and Artmonthly, Sight & Sound, in addition to features and reviews in national newspapers such as the Guardian, Observer, the Independent, The Scotsman, Daily Telegraph and the Sunday Times.

Beagles & Ramsay have also curated a number of group exhibitions and other projects. These have included 'Museum Magogo', Glasgow/Melbourne (1999) 'Dub'l InTrooder' at Transmission, Glasgow (2001), 'Rubble Stir'(2010), 'Triumph Of Zero' at Voidoid and 'Good £uck', Gi Festival 2018. They also edit the journal 'Uncle Chop Chop', which has featured contributions from many artists and writers over the past decade including David Shrigley, Mark Fisher, Dan Perjovschi, Erica Eyres, Mick Peter, Clara Ursitti, Owen Piper.

== Beagles & Ramsay publications ==
'Goodnight, Goodnight' with essays by Dave Beech and Dr Richard F Tester. Published by Collective, Edinburgh (1997) ISBN 978-1873653036

'Beagles & Ramsay 1997–2003' with essays by Francis McKee, Sarah Munro and Moira Jeffrey. Published by Gasworks Gallery, London (2003) ISBN 978-0953805952

'Beagles & Ramsay: Self-portraits 1997–2004' with essays by Patrica Ellis and Catherine Austin. Published by Chapter Arts Centre, Cardiff (2004) ISBN 978-1900029124

'Glitter Deserts and Islands' published by Tramway, Glasgow (2007) ISBN 978-1899551385

'Good £uck' catalogue to accompany the group show of the same name curated by Beagles & Ramsay. Glasgow International Festival (2018) ISBN 978-1-873352-11-3

'Pause. Relax. Insert. Beagles & Ramsay new work 2016–2018' (2018) ISBN 978-1-8380637-0-2

'Ceiling Tile Cosmos. Prints, drawings and paintings by Beagles & Ramsay' New Heads On The Block and Rope A Dope Press (2019) ISBN 978-1-8380637-1-9

'Management Joy' with essays by Simon Buckley and Stephen Wilson (2020) Edinburgh College of Art and Govan Project Space. ISBN 978-1-8380637-2-6

'Beagles & Ramsay Video Hits & Misses 1997–2020' (2020) ISBN 978-1-8380637-3-3

== Selected other publications ==
'Morning Star, Evening Star' catalogue, with essays by various authors, Melbourne (1998)

'Crash!' exhibition catalogue, edited by Emma Dexter. Published by the ICA London (1999)

'Nausea' with essays by Mark Hutchinson and Dr. Nicola Cotton, Djanogly Gallery, Nottingham (2002) ISBN 978-1900809115

'There is always an alternative' essays by Dave Beech and Mark Hutchinson, London (2005)

'When Humour Becomes Painful' essays by Simon Critchley and Slavoj Zizek, Migros Museum, Zurich (2005) ISBN 978-3905701043

"Divided Selves: The Scottish self-portrait from the 17th Century to the present day" Talbot Rice Gallery & Fleming Collection (2006)

'Scotland & Venice 2003–2007' Scottish Arts Council (2008) ISBN 978-1851191642

'Generation. 25 Years of Art in Scotland' National Galleries of Scotland (2014) ISBN 978-1906270728

'Poor Things' Fruitmarket, Edinburgh (2023) ISBN 978-1-908612-67-0

== Public collections, commissions, residencies, and awards ==
2019 National Galleries Of Scotland Collection

2018 Public commission for the European Championships Glasgow/Berlin

2018 Commission for The Glasgow International Festival

2015 Creative Scotland Artist Bursary

2010 Gallery of Modern Art/Glasgow City Museums Collection

2009 Macgeorge Fellowship, Victorian College of the Arts, University of Melbourne

2008 Glasgow Sculpture Studios Production Residency

2005 British Council Award

2004 Grizedale Arts Residency and commission for 'Romantic Detachment' at MoMA PS1, New York.

2004 Scottish Arts Council, Creative Development Award

2003 Artist to Artist Scheme, Visiting Arts & Henry Moore Foundation

2003 Scottish Arts Council publication fund

2002 British Council Award

2001 Glasgow City Council Artist Award

2001 Scottish Arts Council Award

2000 Scottish Arts Trust Award

1998 Scottish Arts Council
