= Katy Dove =

Katy Dove (1 December 1970 – 27 January 2015) was born in Oxford and grew up in the village of Jemimaville on the Black Isle near Inverness in Scotland. She was a multi-media artist working across a variety of media including animation and installations. She was also a musician, playing with the band Muscles of Joy.

== Life and career ==
Dove's first degree was in Psychology from the University of Glasgow. After graduation, Dove supported herself by creating and selling jewellery. In 1996, she gained a scholarship from Duncan of Jordanstone College of Art and Design in Dundee. She undertook a BA and specialised in sculpture. It was during this course of study that she became involved with an artist-initiated project with Unit 13 and as part of the project Full Eye with Anne-Marie Copetake and Ariki Porteous. It was also here that whilst under the tutelage of one of her lectures, Cathy Wilkes, Dove began to use sound, music and movement in her art. Her final installation show was a 90-second work called Fantasy Freedom (1999) and it is suggested that it was this mixed media combination that led to her being involved in representing Scotland in The Venice Biennale in Zenomap 2003. After completing her BA, she moved to Glasgow, where she continued to create further projects combining music and art in addition to co founding the band Muscles of Joy.

She has had Solo exhibitions of her work in the Transmission Gallery; Platform and GoMA, Glasgow; Collective and Talbot Rice, Edinburgh; Pump House, London and Spacex, Exeter.

A memorial exhibition of her work, curated by Graham Domke, was held at Dundee Contemporary Arts in autumn 2016, after which it toured the Highlands of Scotland. The exhibition had originally been planned before her death, as a retrospective of her work.
