= Scottish Stores =

Listed pub in Kings Cross, London, England

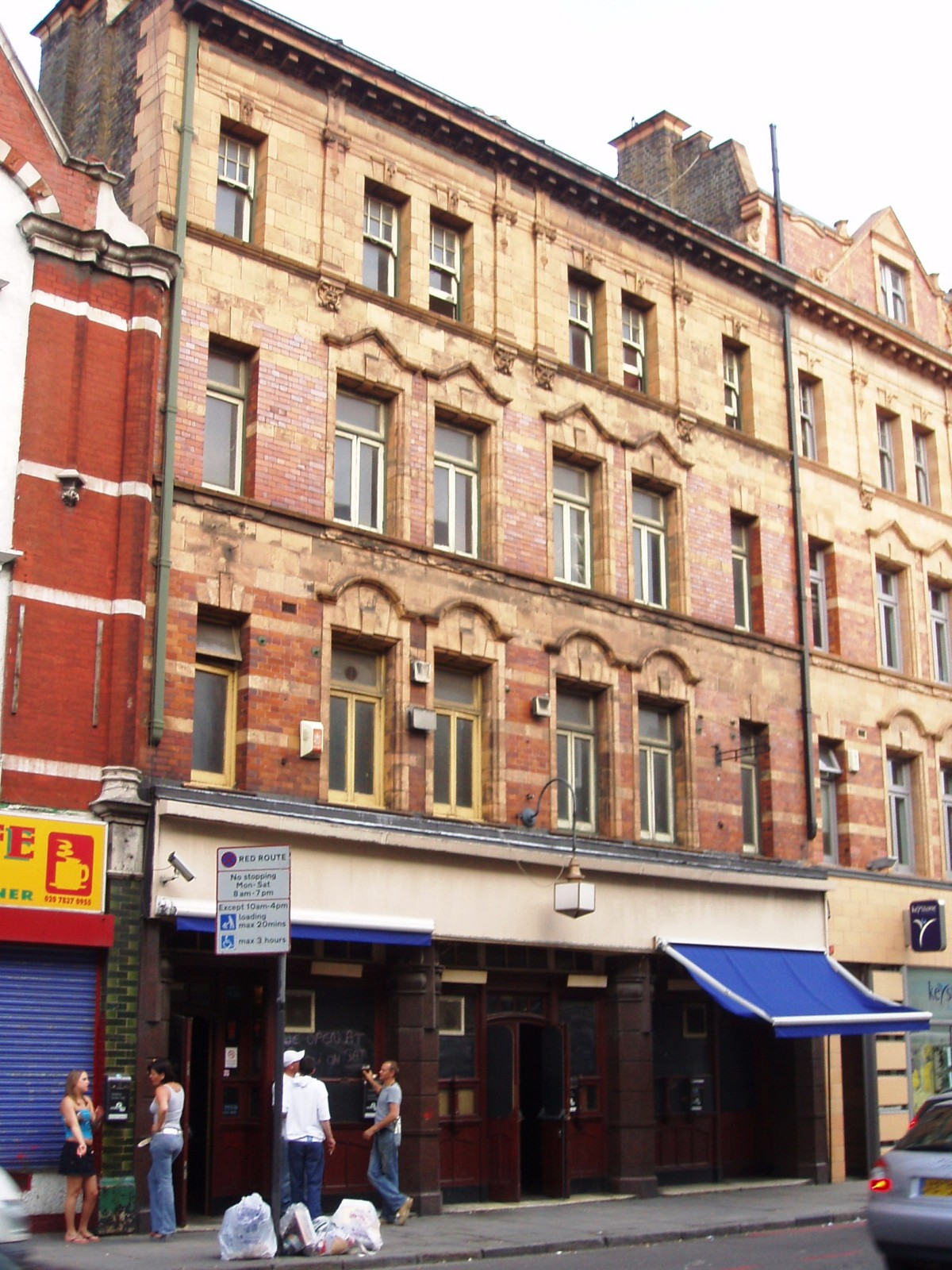
- The pub, then known as the Flying Scotsman, in 2008

- Location within London Borough of Islington Location within Greater London
- Former names: Flying Scotsman

General information
- Type: Public house
- Location: 2–4 Caledonian Road, Kings Cross, London, England
- Coordinates: 51.531082°N 0.12081278°W
- Year built: 1900–1901; 125 years ago
- Renovated: 2015 (restored)
- Client: James Kirk (probable)
- Owner: Keystone Employment Agency Ltd

Design and construction
- Architects: Wylson and Long
- Designations

Listed Building – Grade II
- Official name: 272 to 276, Pentonville Road and Scottish Stores public house 2 to 4, Caledonian Road
- Designated: 30 September 1994
- Reference no.: 1195703

Website
- thescottishstores.co.uk

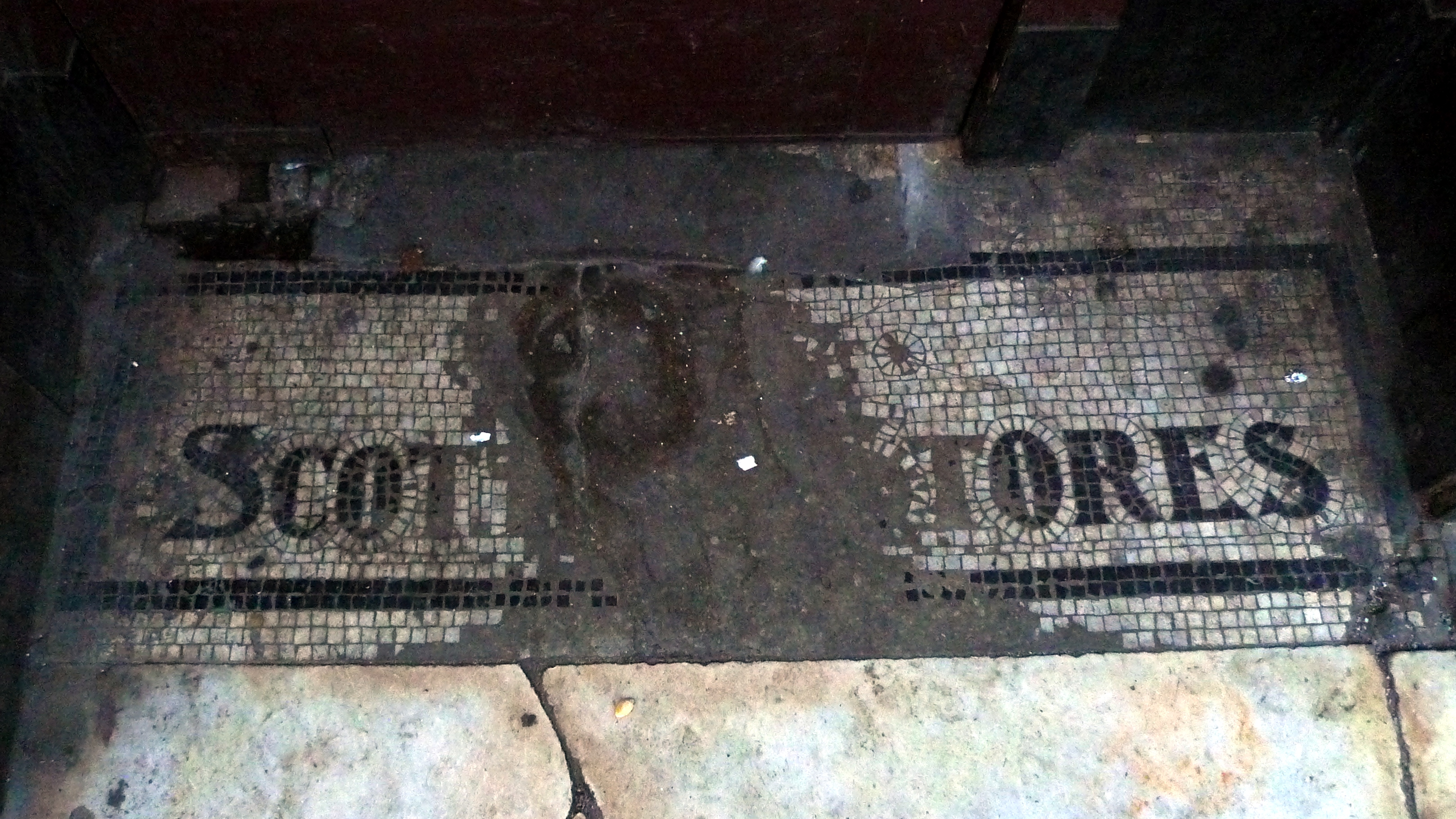
The Scottish Stores, the original name

The Scottish Stores is a Grade II listed public house on Caledonian Road in Kings Cross, London, England. Built in 1900–01 to a design by Wylson and Long, it is noted for its largely intact interior, which has been recognised by the Campaign for Real Ale (CAMRA) as being of "outstanding national historic importance". Known as the Flying Scotsman from the 1980s until 2015, the pub reopened under its original name following a refurbishment that received the CAMRA Historic England Conservation Award in 2016.

== History ==
The building was constructed in 1900–01 as a public house with offices and flats above, to a design by Wylson and Long, probably for James Kirk.

Renamed the Flying Scotsman in the 1980s, it was designated a Grade II listed building on 30 September 1994. The Campaign for Real Ale (CAMRA) regards it as having an interior of "outstanding national historic importance" and awards it a three-star rating on its National Inventory of Historic Pub Interiors.

The Flying Scotsman closed in November 2015 and reopened the following month under its original name, Scottish Stores, as a craft beer pub. The restoration received the CAMRA Historic England Conservation Award in the 2016 Pub Design Awards. In 2016, the pub was extended into the adjacent building, although this had little effect on the historic interior. As of September 2026, the freehold was owned by Keystone Employment Agency Ltd and the pub was leased by The Brill UK LLP.

== Architecture ==
=== Exterior ===
The five-storey building is faced in brown glazed brick with buff terracotta dressings and has a roof concealed behind a parapet. It occupies a curved corner site, with four windows facing Pentonville Road and eleven facing Caledonian Road. The ground floor of the Caledonian Road elevation retains its original 1901 pub frontage, comprising three bays framed by pink granite columns, with glazed screens and entrances at either end and in the centre. Etched glass survives in some windows.

The upper floors are elaborately decorated with terracotta ornament, including moulded window surrounds, keystones, pilasters, cornices and carved heads. The attic storey is distinguished by gables facing both streets and a corner tower with decorative terracotta detailing and metal cresting.

=== Interior ===
The interior is arranged around a central servery, with glazed wooden screens dividing the space into three separate bar areas. The screens incorporate timber panelling, cornices and etched glass, while the bar-back is formed by an arcade of columns and shallow arches. Most of the original partitions survive, although openings have been created between the compartments.

An enclosed staircase at the north-east corner retains etched glass panels and a decorative newel post. Above the bar-back in the southern bar is a cartouche inscribed "The Scottish Stores 1901". Original or early bar counters survive in the three bars, together with extensive timber panelling and other historic fittings.

The interior also retains a set of coloured lithographs by Cecil Aldin, dating from 1900 and mounted within the timber panelling. Additional examples survive in the rear bar.

== In popular culture ==
The pub is the setting for the song "A Pair of Brown Eyes" by The Pogues.

== See also ==
- List of pubs in London
