= Keg de Souza =

Australian artist

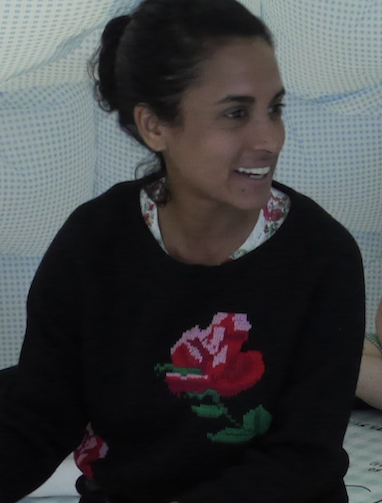
- Born: 1978 (age 47–48); Perth, Australia
- Education: University of New South Wales College of Fine Art
- Occupation: Visual artist
- Website: http://www.kegdesouza.com

Keg de Souza (born 1978) is an Australian artist working across a range of mediums including performance art, drawing, temporary architecture, food, mapping, zines, and artist's booka. Initially training in architecture, she has developed a strong focus of spatial practice also informed by time spent squatting and organising events in Sydney. Often taking a pedagogical approach, she explores themes, situation, social spaces, community, knowledge exchange as well as the commons and places with emphasis on reciprocity, playfulness and participation.

== Biography ==
Keg De Souza was born in 1978 in Perth, Australia and now lives and works in Sydney, Australia. She has been described as an inter-disciplinary artist who works in video, artist’s books, printmaking, inflatable architecture, installation and drawing.

== Education ==
De Souza graduated from University of New South Wales in Art and Design where she exhibited with fellow artist Anna John in The Private Lives of Ups and Downs in 2007.

== Artistic career ==
=== Temporary Spaces, Edible Places ===
De Souza's international picnic project Temporary Spaces, Edible Places began in 2014 at the Delfina Foundation, London. Later that year she was invited to the Isle of Skye by ATLAS Arts to present the work. The project then travelled to the Contemporary Gallery, Vancouver and the AC Institute, New York. In each location, the artist focused on local culture and foods to explore her interest in the politics of food and space in pedagogical learning processes.

"People often gather in spaces around food, and I want to draw on that tendency in order to have my explorations of food grounded in discussion and sharing". Keg de Souza

=== Recent work ===
In July 2018, Keg de Souza first institutional solo exhibition "Common Knowledge and Learning Curves" opened at Artspace Sydney from 29 Jul 2018 until 12 Aug 2018. The exhibition included a meeting place and workshops on 'mindful eating'. The exhibition displayed all the hallmarks of her work including temporal structures using ready-made materials and site-specific events that invited participation from local residents; migrant as well as indigenous, including those who had recently moved into the community.

Other exhibitions include; The National: New Australian Art, Art Gallery of New South Wales (2017); 20th Biennale of Sydney (2016); Setouchi Triennale (2016); Appetite for Construction, Contemporary Art Gallery, Vancouver (2016); Preservation, Contemporary Art Gallery, Vancouver (2015); Temporality in Architecture, Food and Communities, Delfina Foundation, London (2014); 5th Auckland Triennial (2013) and 15th Jakarta Biennale (2013).
