= Derek Robertson (artist) =

Scottish artist

Derek Robertson RSW SSA SAA (born 1967) is a Scottish artist. One of the signature members of the Society of Animal Artists, he is known for his paintings of wildlife and landscapes, and for his poetic narrative work consisting of paintings, constructions and installations. He has been elected several times to the Council of the Royal Scottish Society of Painters in Watercolour. He has written and presented five television programs about his work and the wildlife he portrays. He has written five books about his art: The Mugdrum, Highland Sketchbook, A Studio Under the Sky, Otters, An Artist's Sketchbook, Living Landscapes and Puffins: An Artist's Sketchbook. His work has also illustrated many other publications.

== Life and work ==
Derek Robertson was born near St Andrews, Fife, Scotland. While at the High School of Dundee, he attended weekend art classes by James MacIntosh Patrick before completing a BA (Hons) in drawing and painting at Duncan of Jordanstone College of Art, Dundee.

On graduating in 1989, he was commissioned by HarperCollins to write and illustrate his first book, Highland Sketchbook, which was nominated for the McVities Prize. He was then commissioned by Grampian Television to present a program about his work for the series Portrait of the Wild. He went on to write and present a series of four half-hour programs for Grampian TV/STV entitled Drawn From Wild Places.

Robertson has won several awards, including the RSW Small Painting Prize, Glasgow Art Club Fellowship and John Gray Award.

He has illustrated many publications, most notably Song of the Rolling Earth and Nature's Child by the nature writer Sir John Lister-Kaye.

Robertson exhibits mainly in the UK, but also overseas. His work is held in public and private collections internationally. His wildlife work is noted for his use of outdoor sketching from life and for often using the unusual technique of watercolour on linen.

He has served on the selection and hanging committees for a number of the exhibiting societies in Scotland and on the council of the Aberdeen Artists Society.

He has worked on collaborative projects with the poets Valerie Gillies and Rody Gorman. Robertson was appointed artist in residence at Tentsmuir Nature Reserve and has worked on numerous collaborative projects with scientists and other creative practitioners.

== Wildlife research ==
Robertson is an amateur wildlife researcher. He is a licensed bird ringer and has assisted many research projects which have resulted in co-authored publications, including a collaborative research project on farmland finches with the BTO. His own studies have also been published in scientific papers. He has illustrated and edited a number of papers and publications, including the Fife Bird Atlas. He has accompanied research expeditions to Africa, Scandinavia, and seabird islands such as St Kilda, the Shiant Isles and Handa Island, which have all featured in his paintings. He has served on many research and conservation committees including the Isle of May Bird Observatory, the Tay Ringing Group, and the BTO council and ringing committee.
