= Lee Ann Martin =

Lee Ann Martin was appointed to the Provincial Court of Manitoba on September 17, 2007.

Judge Martin studied law at the Panthéon-Assas University, France in 1991, obtaining a civil law degree and practising in France before returning to Winnipeg. She graduated from the University of Manitoba's Faculty of Law in 2000 and practised with the firm of Aikins MacAulay and Thorvaldson. She also served as the presiding officer of the Workers Compensation Appeal Commission and was an instructor on comparative law at the University of Manitoba's Faculty of Law.
