= Calum Colvin =

Calum Colvin OBE RSA (born Glasgow, 1961) is a Scottish artist whose work combines photography, painting, and installation, and often deals with issues of Scottish identity and culture and with the history of art. He has had solo exhibitions at the Scottish National Gallery of Modern Art, Scottish National Portrait Gallery, and Royal Scottish Academy and has a number of works in the collections of the National Galleries of Scotland, Tate Galleries, and the British Council. He is also Professor of Fine Art Photography and Programme Director, Art & Media at Duncan of Jordanstone College of Art and Design, part of the University of Dundee.

== Life and work ==
Colvin studied at Duncan of Jordanstone College of Art, Dundee from 1979 to 1983, gaining a diploma in sculpture, and at the Royal College of Art, London from 1983 to 1985, where he was awarded an MA in photography.

His art generally involves taking a roomful of objects and painting a design on them so that when seen from one particular viewpoint it appears to form a flat image in a trompe-l'œil style. However, when seen from any other viewpoint the illusion would be broken. Colvin then takes photographs of the room from the particular viewpoint that preserves the illusion and exhibits the photograph. This means that at first glance the viewer thinks they see a flat image and only gradually can pick out the details revealing they are seeing a three-dimensional scene.

His images are full of bright colours, and he initially worked with the Cibachrome colour process, commonly used in advertising and commercial photography.

His exhibition Ossian Fragments of Ancient Poetry (2002) was inspired by James Macpherson's fraudulent works attributed to the ancient Celtic poet Ossian. His exhibition Natural Magic (2009), took its title from David Brewster's Letters on Natural Magic; Brewster pioneered photography in Scotland as well as inventing the kaleidoscope and other optical devices. Colvin played with ideas about illusions and vision, including examining claims that Renaissance artist Jacopo Chimenti had invented stereoscopic images. The exhibition received a five star review from The Scotsman.

== Exhibitions ==
- The Seven Deadly Sins and the Four Last Things, 1993. Inspired by Hieronymous Bosch.
- Sacred and Profane, Scottish National Gallery of Modern Art, 1998
- Ossian Fragments of Ancient Poetry, Scottish National Portrait Gallery, 2002
- Natural Magic, Royal Scottish Academy, 2009
- Burnsiana, 2013. Exhibition and book produced in collaboration with poet Rab Wilson.

== Permanent collections ==
Colvin's work is held in the following permanent collections:

- National Galleries of Scotland collection, including a portrait of composer James MacMillan and versions of Peter Paul Rubens's The Feast of Herod and Titian's Venus Anadyomene.
- British Council
- Tate Galleries.

== Awards ==
- Member of the Royal Scottish Academy
- OBE, 2001, for his contribution to the visual arts
