= Anne Martin (Gaelic singer) =

Gaelic singer

- Anna Mhartainn
- Education: MSc Material Culture and Highland History
- Occupation: Gaelic singer
- Website: http://www.annemartin.scot/

Anne Martin (born 1963), also known as Anna Mhartainn, is a Gaelic singer from the Isle of Skye whose performances explore and celebrate her cultural heritage through music. She has performed internationally in Ireland, Australia and India as well as in Scotland, her native country.

== Early life ==
Anne Martin was born in Linicro, Kilmuir on the Isle of Skye in 1963. Gaelic song was part of her life since early childhood, where traditional music played a significant role.

== Career ==
Anne Martin is an international artist who has performed in Ireland, Australia, Canada and India. She also provided the soundtrack for the 2016 film shot by crofters from the Isle of Skye 'Grazing on the Edge'. Anne Martin was one of the original founders of the Ceol on the Croft festival, a two-day music festival, which took place in Kilmuir on the Isle of Skye for two years running in 2014 and 2015.

In 2017, Anne Martin collaborated with Jason Singh to create Ceumannan – Footsteps 2 as part of a project commissioned by Atlas Arts. The collaboration began on the Isle of Skye, where Jason Singh visited on invitation from Atlas Art. The pair were then funded by the same organisation to visit India where they explored intercultural responses to landscapes and storytelling as well as the harmonic traditions of Indian and Gaelic music. The resulting album is described as a synthesis of traditional Gaelic song and North Indian Raga. Ceumannan was selected as a winning commission at the PRS Foundation's New Music Biennial awards and Martin and Singh performed the piece together as part of the PRS Festival, which took place in Hull in 2017. During their visit to India, Martin and Singh had met international artists Sharat Chandra Srivastava and Gyan Singh. Together they developed a new music piece entitled Routes, which they performed under the band name Lahira with Joe Harrison-Greaves at Sabhal Mòr Ostaig during the Skye Festival in July 2017 and at Celtic Connections in Glasgow in January 2018.

== Discography ==
=== Solo album ===
- Co...? (2002)

=== Collaborative works ===
- Nighean Nan Geug (2005) with Ingrid Henderson
- Ceumannan – Footsteps 2 (2017) with Jason Singh
- Routes (2017) with band Lahira (includes Jason Singh, Joe Harrison-Greaves, Sharat Chandra Srivastava and Gyan Singh)
