= Annie Martin =

Annie Martin may refer to:

- Annie Martin (beach volleyball) (born 1981), Canadian beach volleyball player
- Annie Martin (artist) (born 1957), Canadian artist
- Annie B. Martin (1920–2012), American pioneer of the labor and civil rights movements
- Annie Montgomerie Martin (1841–1918), teacher and headmistress of Adelaide, South Australia
