= Ilana Halperin =

American artist (born 1973)

- Born: 1973 (age 52–53); Manhattan, New York, USA
- Education: MFA (Fine Arts), Glasgow School of Art
- Alma mater: Brown University
- Occupation: Artist
- Website: https://geologicnotes.wordpress.com/

Ilana Halperin (born 1973) is an artist with an interest in the relationships between geological phenomena and daily life. Her artwork is produced using a variety of media, writing, performance, printmaking, sculpture, drawing, and film. She lives and works in Glasgow, Scotland.

== Life and education ==
Halperin was born in 1973 in Manhattan, New York. She grew up near the Bowery neighborhood. Halperin attended the New York High School of Performing Arts (famously known as the setting for the 1980 film Fame), and trained as a stone carver. She graduated with a Bachelor of Arts from Brown University in 1995, before moving to Scotland to study the Master of Fine Art course at the Glasgow School of Art, from where she graduated in 2000.

== Work ==
=== Themes ===
I trained as a stone carver, but I had gone from an interest in carving to an interest in the processes that made stone

— Ilana Halperin, March 2017

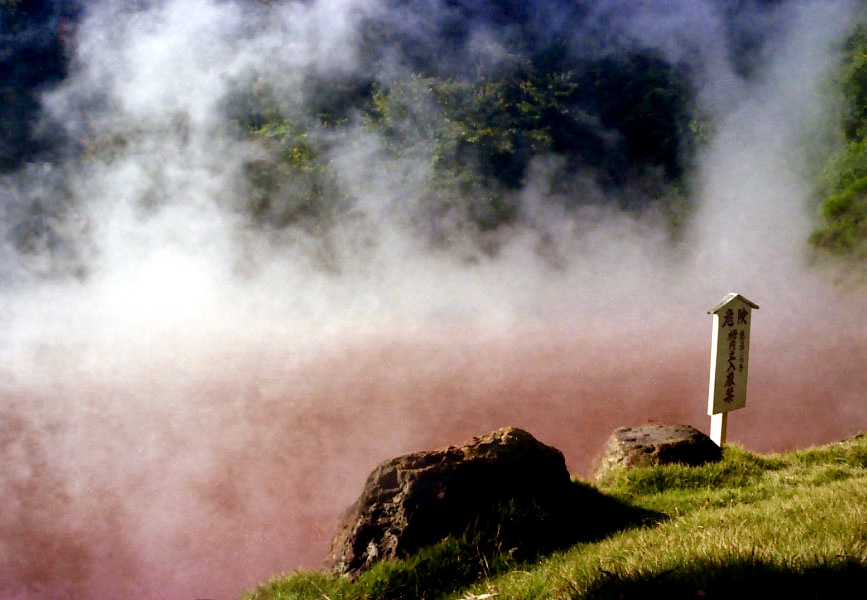
Chinoike Jigoku, one of the eight hells of Beppu, Japan

Halperin's work is predominantly focused around connections between geological time and human time. She conducts fieldwork with specialists worldwide, including mineralogists, geologists, vulcanologists and archaeologists, and creates her work by placing herself or others directly in geologically significant or active locations. This has led to collaborative works such as with the National Soils Archive in Aberdeen, who supplied Halperin with a sample of four soils from a core sample taken at Slighthouses Farm, where James Hutton, the 18th Century Scottish geologist known as the "Father of Modern Geology", lived and farmed. The samples were used to create a series of prints with Peacock Visual Art's Master Printmaker. Halperin used Yame Washi, the oldest Japanese handmade paper (which can last a thousand years) and ink made from two kinds of hot spring minerals collected from the hot spring Hells of Beppu (別府の地獄 Beppu no jigoku), paired with the soil samples.

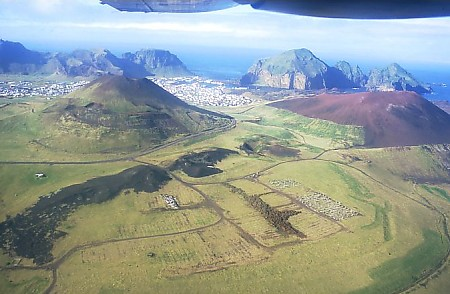
The island of Heimaey, with Helgafell at the left and Eldfell volcano on the right. The extent of the 1973 eruption fissure south of Eldfell is clearly seen.

To celebrate her 30th birthday, in 2003 Halpern travelled to the Island of Heimaey off the southern coast of Iceland, to visit the Eldfell volcano which also appeared in the world in 1973, the same year as Halperin was born. At Heimaey she collected a crystal. In 2013, one decade later, Halperin returned to Eldfell, and on this visit collected an agate from the red lava flow. Both items were included in cases at the National Museum of Scotland, where Halperin received the museum's inaugural Artist's Fellowship in 2013.

=== Awards ===
- Creative Scotland Artist Award
