= Duncan of Jordanstone College of Art & Design =

Art school of the University of Dundee

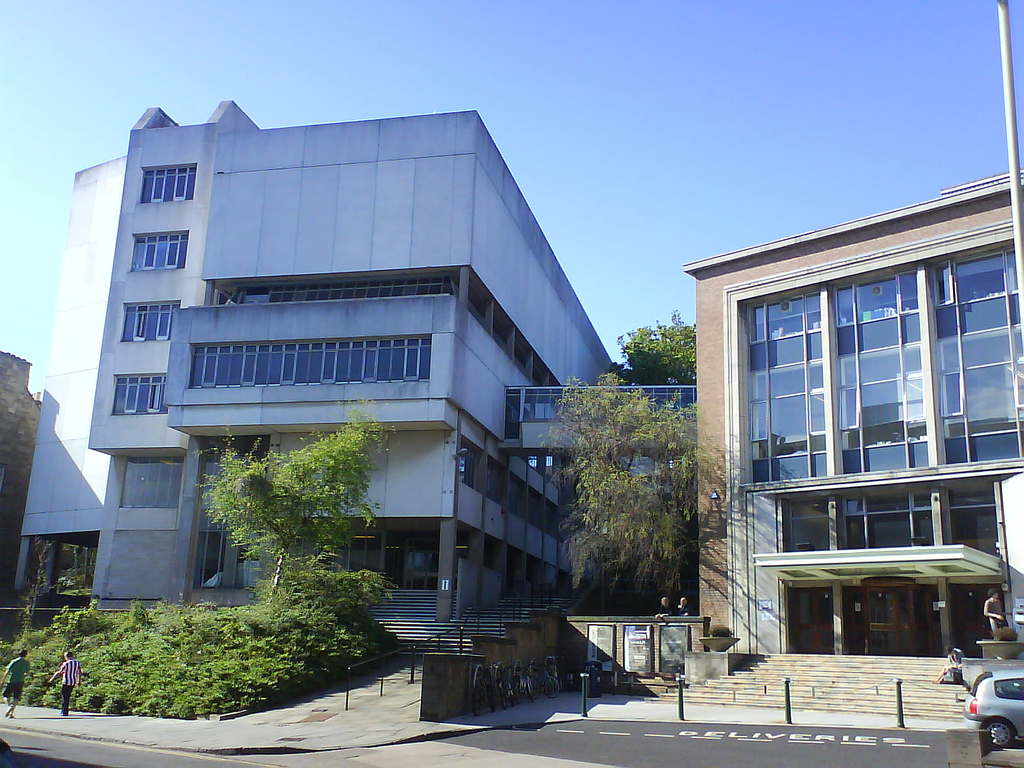
- Type: Art school
- Established: 1888; 138 years ago
- Affiliations: University of Dundee
- Chancellor: George Robertson, Baron Robertson of Port Ellen
- Rector: Keith Harris
- Principal: Iain Gillespie
- Dean: Anita Taylor
- Faculty: 72
- Administrative staff: 15
- Undergraduates: 1,200
- Postgraduates: 100
- Doctoral students: 45
- Location: 13 Perth Road, Dundee, DD1 4HT, Scotland, UK; 56°27′23.76″N 2°58′58.08″W
- Website: www.dundee.ac.uk/djcad

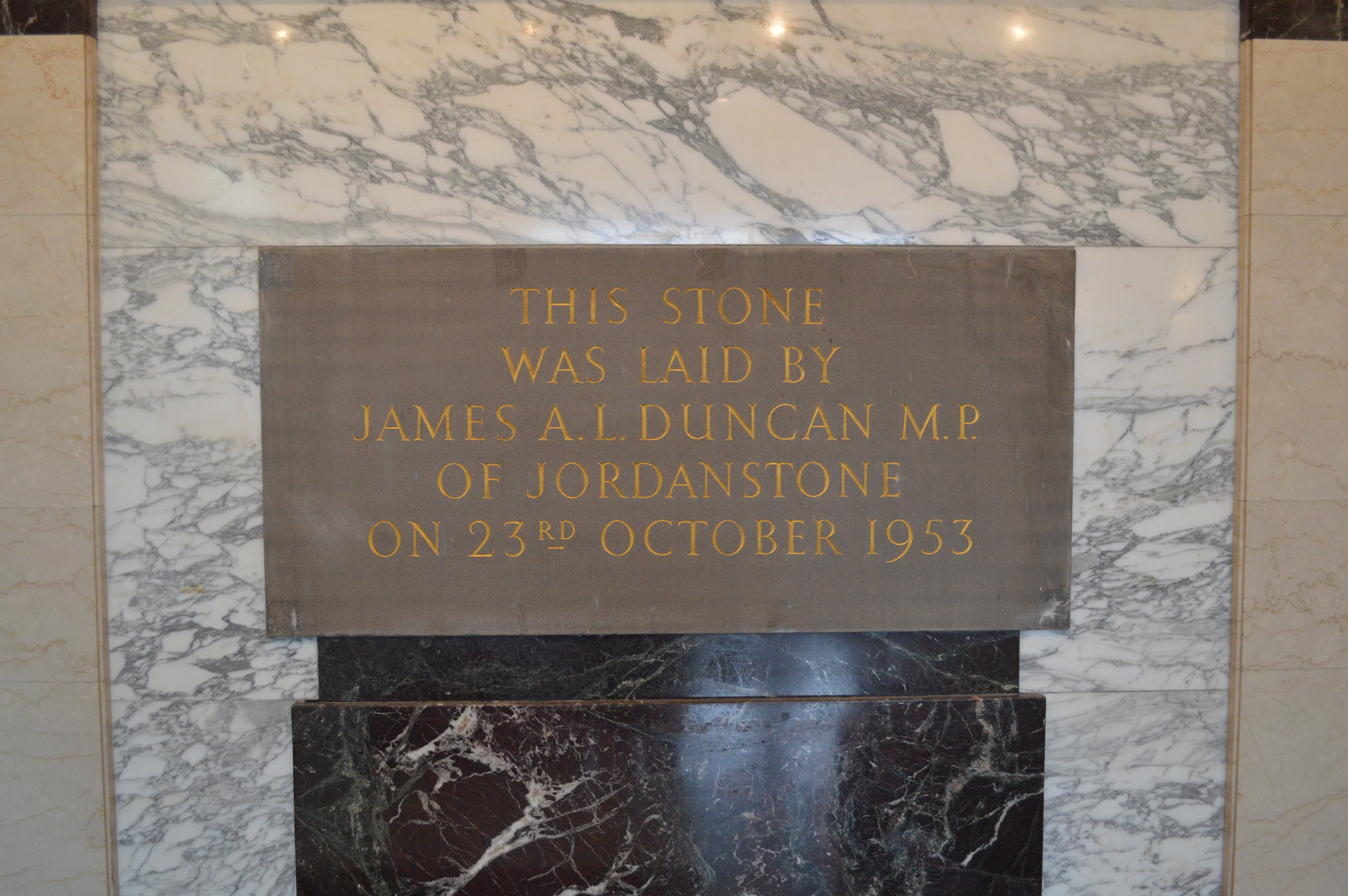
Foundation stone of Duncan of Jordanstone College of Art

Duncan of Jordanstone College of Art & Design (DJCAD) is part of the University of Dundee in Dundee, Scotland. It is ranked as one of the top schools of art and design in the United Kingdom.

== History ==
Attempts were made to establish an art school in Dundee in the 1850s, and evening classes in art were taught at the High School and the YMCA with great success. A full-time art school only became a possibility following the creation of the Dundee Technical Institute in 1888. The Institute was based in Small's Wynd, now part of the University of Dundee's main campus, and shared facilities with what was then University College, Dundee.

From the start, art classes were taught at the Institute in the evenings by George Malcolm, but in 1892 Thomas Delgaty Dunn was appointed as the first full-time art master, and the college later came to regard this as the date of its foundation.

The Technical Institute's main building, designed by J. Murray Robertson, soon became inadequate, particularly when the High School and YMCA art classes were amalgamated with those of the institute. A fund-raising campaign was launched in 1907, and in 1911 the Institute moved to new and much grander premises on Bell Street, designed by Robert Gibson and James Langlands, where it re-opened as Dundee Technical College & School of Art. A further incentive for the development of the school came in 1909 with the bequest of £60,000 by James Duncan of Jordanstone to establish an independent art school in the city. A lengthy legal battle ensued as to whether the existing college could spend the money, and it was not until the 1930s that an agreement was reached whereby the college was reorganised as Dundee Institute of Art & Technology, the College of Art to be autonomously run on a separate site away from the Technical College. A site was chosen and plans drawn up by architect James Wallace in 1937, but due to delays largely caused by the war, construction did not begin until 1953. Classes began in what is now called the Crawford Building in 1955, though it would not be completed until 1964.

The college was renamed Duncan of Jordonstone College of Art in 1961 but did not become entirely independent of the Institute of Technology (now the University of Abertay) until 1975. By that time it has expanded into a new building next door (now called the Matthew Building, designed by Baxter Clark & Paul). The college remained independent until 1994 when it became part of the University of Dundee. Over time Duncan of Jordanstone has built up strong academic links with other disciplines in the university, manifested in joint programmes such as Medical Art, Forensic Art and Art & Humanities.

== Structure ==
DJCAD is a school within the University of Dundee and is led by current dean, Professor Anita Taylor. DJCAD is structured around Undergraduate, Postgraduate and Research portfolios rather than the more traditional disciplinary departmental approach. The school is located within the Crawford and Matthew buildings, with part of the Matthew building shared with the separate Architecture department.

== Courses offered at DJCAD ==
There are a range of courses at the College of Art and Design. The university offers bachelors, masters and PhD levels. Bachelors are typically four years, the standard in Scotland, with the exception of Architecture.

The courses offered are:

Within General Foundation:

- BDes (Hons) Animation
- BDes (Hons) Art & Design
- BA (Hons) Art & Philosophy
- BA (Hons) Fine Art
- BDes (Hons) Graphic Design
- BDes (Hons) Illustration
- BDes (Hons) Jewellery & Metal Design
- BDes (Hons) Textile Design

Within Social Digital:

- BSc (Hons) Digital Interaction Design
- BDes (Hons) Interior Design
- BSc (Hons) Product Design

Within Architecture & Urban Planning:

- BA (Hons) Architectural Studies
- BArch (Hons) Architecture
- MA (hons) Urban Planning

Postgraduate courses:

- MFA Art & Humanities
- MFA Art, Science & Visual Thinking
- MSc Animation & VFX
- MFA Curatorial Practice
- MSc Design For Business
- Msc Product Design
- Msc Design for Healthcare
- Msc Spatial Planning with Urban Design
- MArch Architecture
- DProf Art & Design

== Facilities ==
A number of facilities are available to students at DJCAD, with some available to all students at the university. Some of the facilities require students to complete training to get access, and these can be booked online through the university.

These include:

- Art Materials shop (located on level 3 Crawford Building)
- Boardroom (located on level 2 Crawford Building)
- Cantina (located on level 2 Crawford Building)
- Ceramics Workshop (located on level 5 Matthew Building)
- Computer Labs, sometimes referred to as IT Suites (located in Crawford and Matthew Buildings)
- Cooper Gallery (located on Level 1&2 Crawford Building)
- Digital Making (located on level 4 Crawford Building)
- Equipment Loans (located on level 3 Matthew Building)
- Foundry (located on level 5 Matthew Building)
- Group Study Rooms (located on level 4 Matthew Building)
- Jewellery & Metal Design Workshop (located on level 5 Crawford Building)
- Knit and Stitch Workshop (located on level 4 Crawford Building)
- Lecture Theatres located on level 5 Matthew Building)
- Library (located on level 4 Matthew Building)
- Photography Studios (located in Crawford and Matthew Buildings)
- Print Textiles Workshop (located on level 3 Crawford Building)
- Printmaking workshop (located on level 2 Crawford Building)
- Print Unit (located on level 5 Matthew Building)
- Projector Mapping (located on level 3 Matthew Building)
- Reception (located on level 1 Matthew Building)
- Wood Workshop (located on level 5 Matthew Building)

== Notable alumni ==
- Roger Ball
- Clio Barnard
- Johanna Basford
- Gary Clark
- Calum Colvin OBE
- Lewis Deeney
- Katy Dove
- Malcolm Duncan
- Luke Fowler
- Jackie Hatfield
- Euan Heng
- Patrick Hennessy
- Geoff Holder
- Marine Joatton
- Anna King
- David Mach
- David Mackenzie (film director)
- James McIntosh (food writer)
- Lucy McKenzie
- Farshid Moussavi (architect)
- Russ Nicholson
- Christopher Orr
- Susan Philipsz
- Deborah Phillips
- Derek Robertson
- Tom Simpson
- Sneha Solanki
- Tony Stallard
- Voytek
- Albert Watson
- Amanda Askell

== Notable staff ==
- Edward Baird
- Calum Colvin
- Hugh Adam Crawford
- Dalziel + Scullion
- Ronald Forbes
- Will Maclean
- David McClure
- Alison McKenzie
- Joseph McKenzie
- Alberto Morrocco
- Stephen Partridge
- James McIntosh Patrick
- Elaine Shemilt
- Scott Sutherland
- Dudley D Watkins

== Research ==
The college research was rated highly in the UK Higher Education research assessment in 2021. The Times rated DJCAD as third in Scotland for art and design, and 27th in the UK by Grade Point Average (Intensity). 71% of its outputs were rated at 3 or 4-star. The Impact element of DJCAD Research was graded 62.5% at 4-star and 37.5% at 3-star. The REF judged DJCAD's research environment, including underlying support and infrastructure, external income, and PhD performance, 100% at either 3 or 4-star levels. The college was commended for its established research culture and interdisciplinary and collaborative research, with a PhD community which in 2014 numbered around 45 with 25 post doctoral research assistants. Research projects and students are either clustered around the facilities within the college buildings including the campus based Research Studio.

== Exhibitions: sites and galleries ==
Temporary exhibitions are held in various galleries within the college. Since January 2008, 72 exhibitions, 68 events, 11 performances, 27 talks, 11 seminars/workshops and three symposia have been staged. There are four galleries: Cooper Gallery (215 sq. metres); Cooper Gallery Project Space (100 sq. metres); Bradshaw Art Space (90 sq. metres); Matthew Gallery (300 sq. metres). As well as the galleries in the college, work from the college's collections and exhibitions by notable alumni are shown in the Lamb Gallery, the Tower Foyer Gallery and other venues around the university.

=== Collections ===
The college also maintains an art collection of work by its students, usually acquired from the annual Degree Shows. The collection is now managed as a public museum collection by the University of Dundee Museum Services. There are also important holdings of furniture design, textile design from the Needlework Development Scheme, video art and a large archive and collection from performance artist Alastair MacLennan. Work by College staff is regularly exhibited in sites owned by the City of Dundee, the university generally or the DCA as well as in events throughout the world.

abcD | artists' books collection Dundee

The DJCAD Library, originally established in 1999 as the Centre for Artists Books by Alec Finlay, now with 1,450 books, multiples and ephemera from 600 artists represented in the collection. (Notable names include Andy Warhol, Marcel Duchamp, Carl Andre, John Cage, Valie Export, Bruce Nauman, Dieter Roth, Carolee Schneemann, Jake & Dinos Chapman, Susan Hiller, Yoko Ono, Helen Douglas, Tacita Dean, Bruce Maclean, David Shrigley, Julian Opie, John Latham, Simon Starling, Ian Hamilton Finlay, David Bellingham and Toby Paterson).

== Dundee Degree Show and Dundee Masters Show ==
The Dundee Degree Show is organised annually in May to showcase the work of final year undergraduate students. It usually runs for around a week.

Awards:

- 2013 - UK Event Awards - Educational Event of the Year
- 2014 - New Designers - Best Stand Award

== Gallery ==
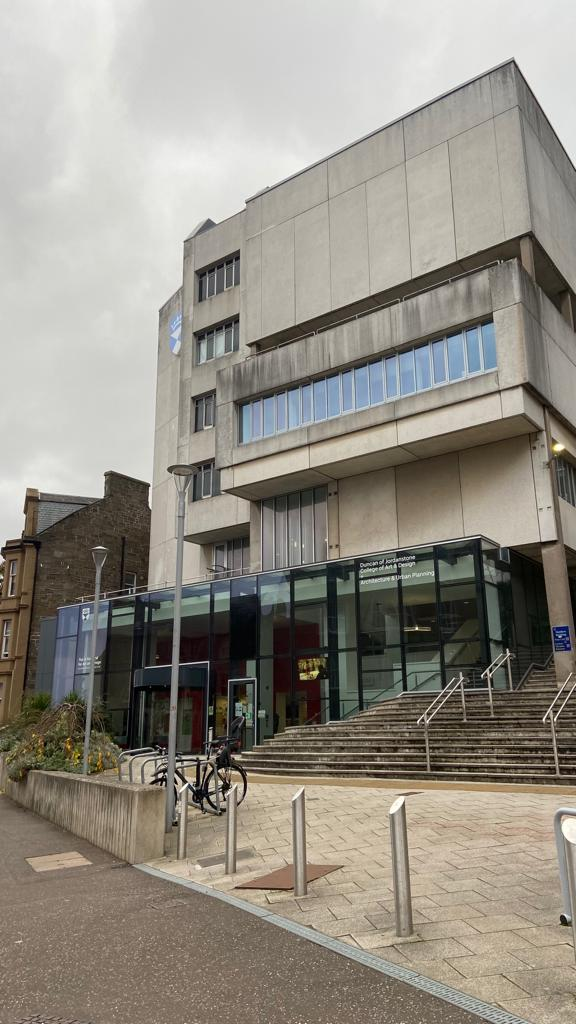

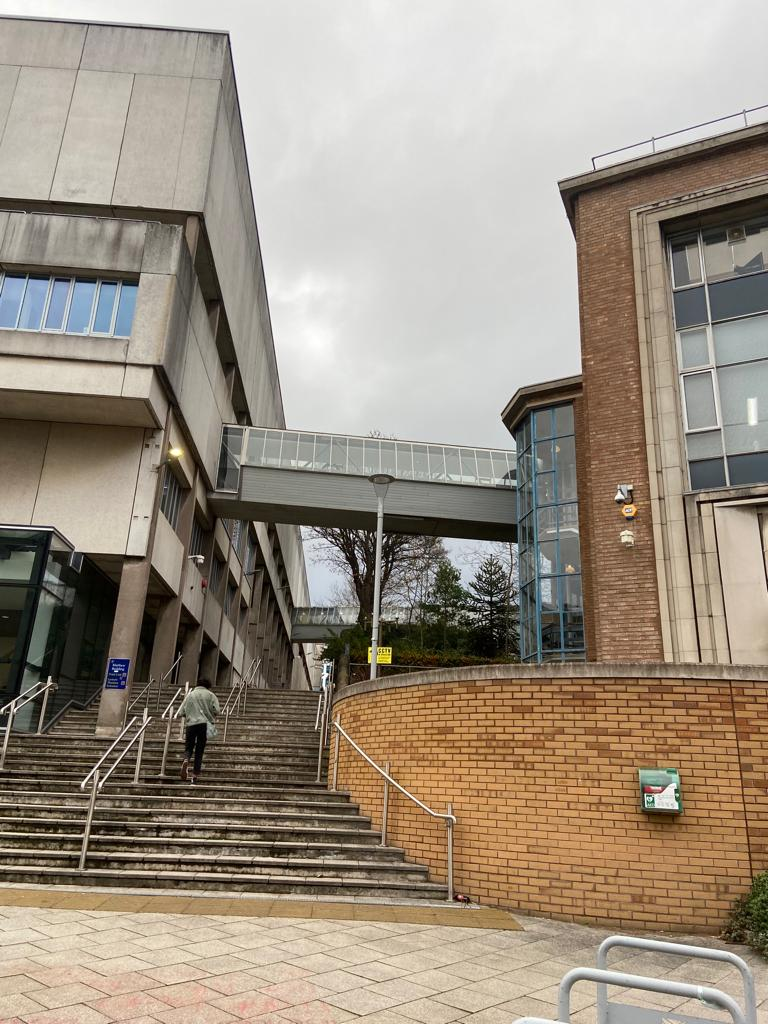

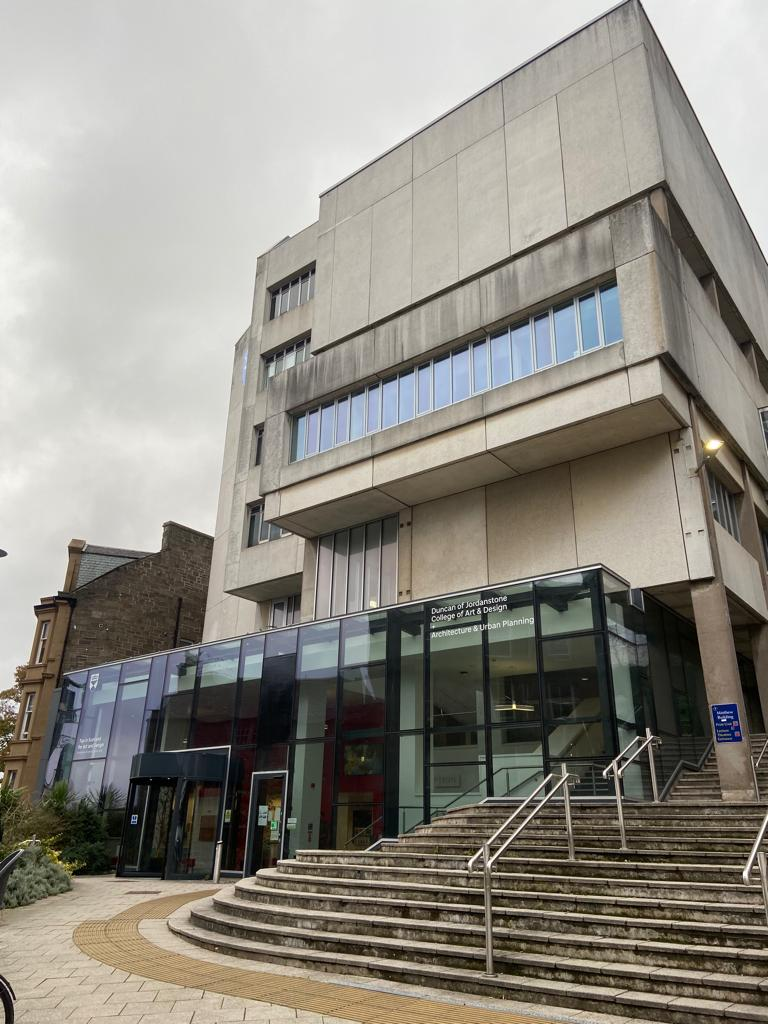

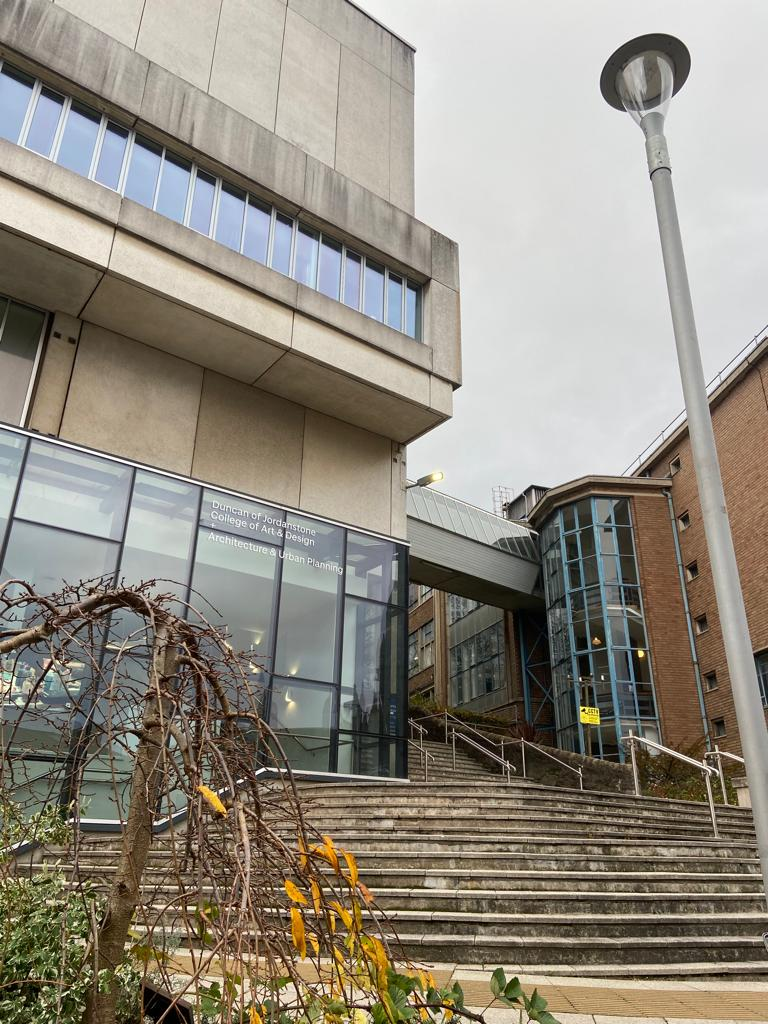

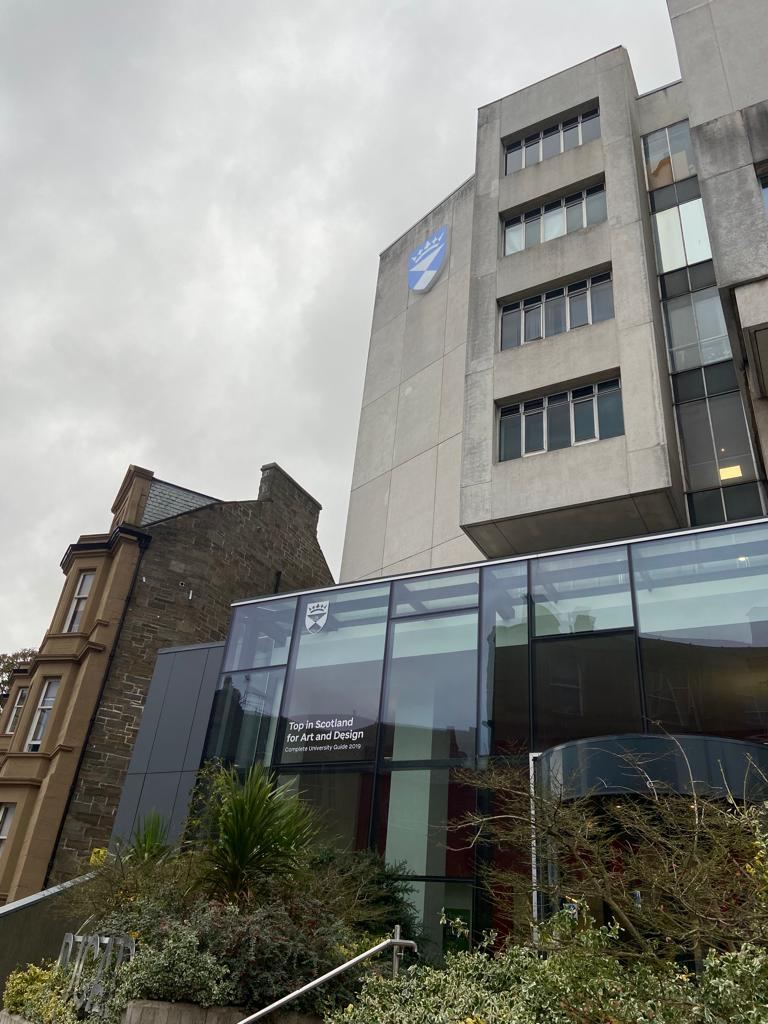
