= Rody Gorman =

Irish-born poet (born 1960)

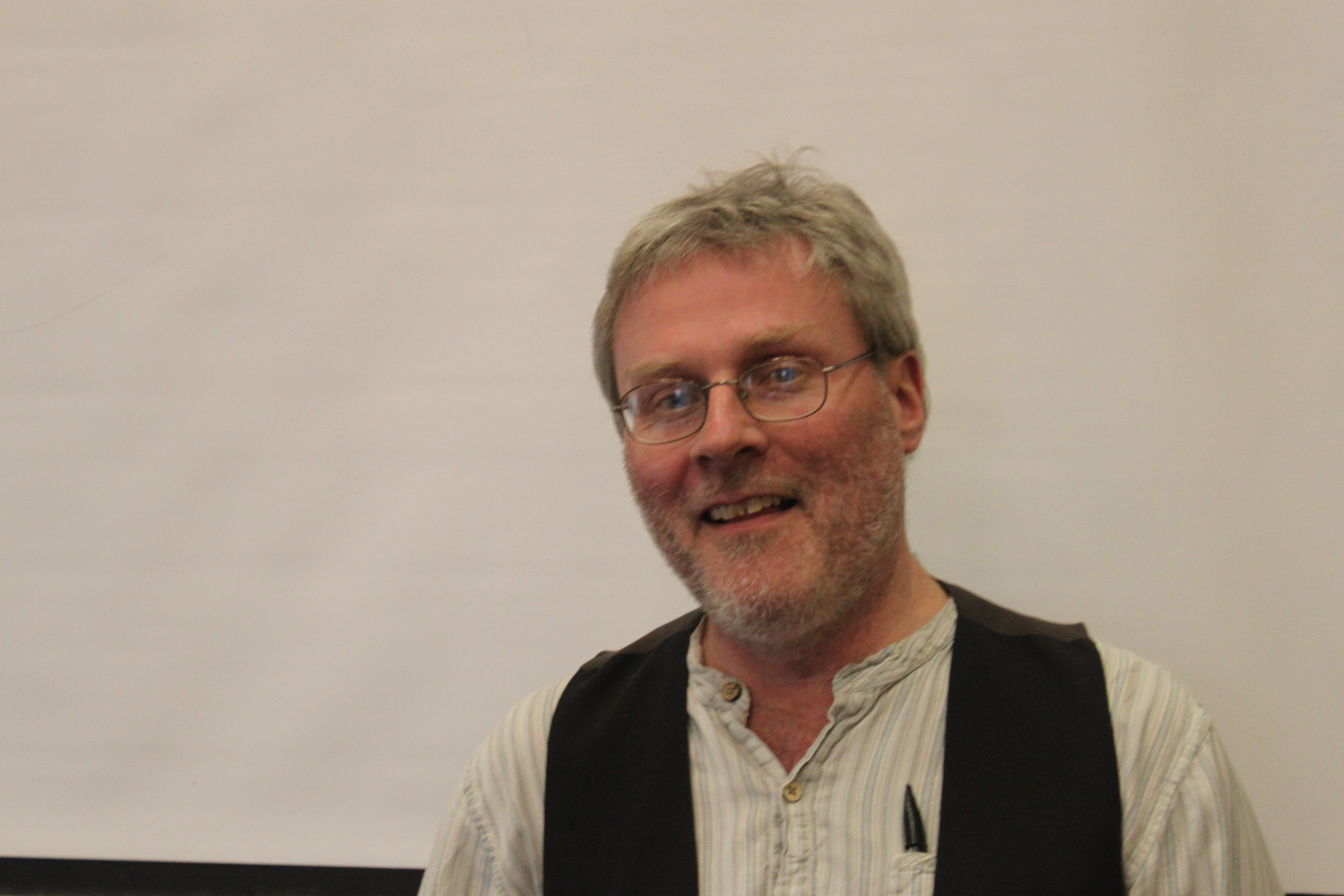
Rody Gorman photo - May 2013

Rody Gorman is an Irish-born poet who lives in Scotland and whose main creative medium is Scottish Gaelic. He was born in Dublin on 1 January 1960 and now lives in the Isle of Skye, Scotland.

He is editor of An Guth, an annual Irish and Scottish Gaelic poetry anthology. He has also been a writing fellow at University College Cork, Sabhal Mòr Ostaig in Skye and An Lanntair in Lewis. He has received bursaries and funding from HI-Arts, the Royal Literary Fund, the Society of Authors, the Scottish Arts Council and the Arts Council of Ireland. He has been Specialist Adviser for the Scottish Arts Council and Convenor of the Translation and Linguistic Rights Committee of Scottish PEN. He has also been an adjudicator of literary competitions.

== Published works ==
- Fax and Other Poems (Polygon, 1996)
- Cùis-Ghaoil (diehard, 1999),
- Bealach Garbh (Coiscéim, 1999),
- Air a' Charbad fo Thalamh/On the Underground (Polygon, 2000),
- Naomhóga na Laoi (Coiscéim, 2003),
- Tóithín ag Tláithínteacht (Lapwing, 2004),
- An Duilleog agus an Crotal (Coiscéim, 2004),
- Flora from Lusitania (Lapwing, 2005)
- Zonda? Khamsin? Sharaav? Camanchaca? (Leabhraichean Beaga, Inverness, 2006)
- Chernilo, selected poems in Irish and Scottish Gaelic (Coiscéim, 2006)
- Eadar Fiaradh is Balbh na h-Oidhche (diehard, Callander, 2007) in English, Irish and Scottish Gaelic
- Bearan Briste/Burstbroken judgementshroudloomdeeds (Cape Breton University Press, 2011)
- Trìtheamhan (diehard, 2017)
