= Taigh Chearsabhagh =

Arts Centre on North Uist, Scotland

Coordinates: 57.598°N 7.156°W

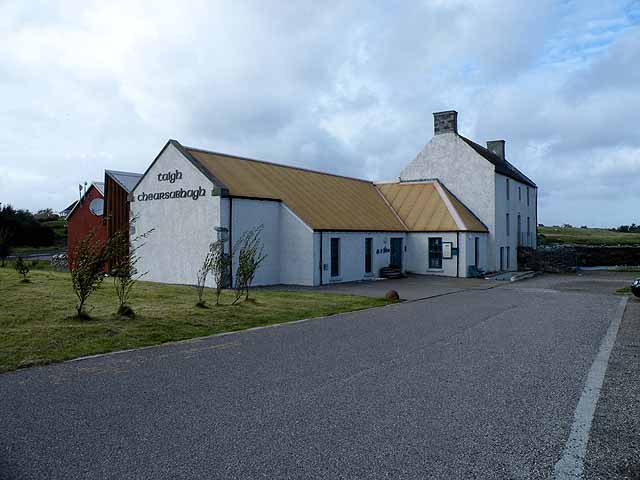

Taigh Chearsabhagh is an arts centre and museum in Lochmaddy on the island of North Uist, Scotland.

Taigh Chearsabhagh was built in 1741 and originally used as an inn; it has since served as a post office, house and workshop before being developed as an arts centre since 1993. It is the base for the art school of Lews Castle College, part of the University of the Highlands and Islands, where students can study for NC Art and Design or a BA (Hons) in Fine Art, or take short courses.

In 2022 it was a venue for Simon Armitage's Poet Laureate's Library Tour.
