= Flying Scot (bicycles) =

Bicycle brand

Flying Scot was a marque used by Scottish and then an English bicycle manufacturer

The Flying Scot bikes were first built in 1901 by David Rattray and Co. in Glasgow. Rattray was probably the largest maker of lightweight bicycles in Scotland. Rattray went out of business in 1982.

In 1982, Dave Yates at M. Steel Cycles in England purchased the "Flying Scot" name. M Steel built bikes under this name until 1991. The M. Steel bikes are labeled "Flying Scot" whereas the Rattray bicycles were "The Flying Scot".
