= Scott Sutherland =

Scottish sculptor

- Born: Wick, Caithness, Scotland
- Awards: Guthrie Award, 1940

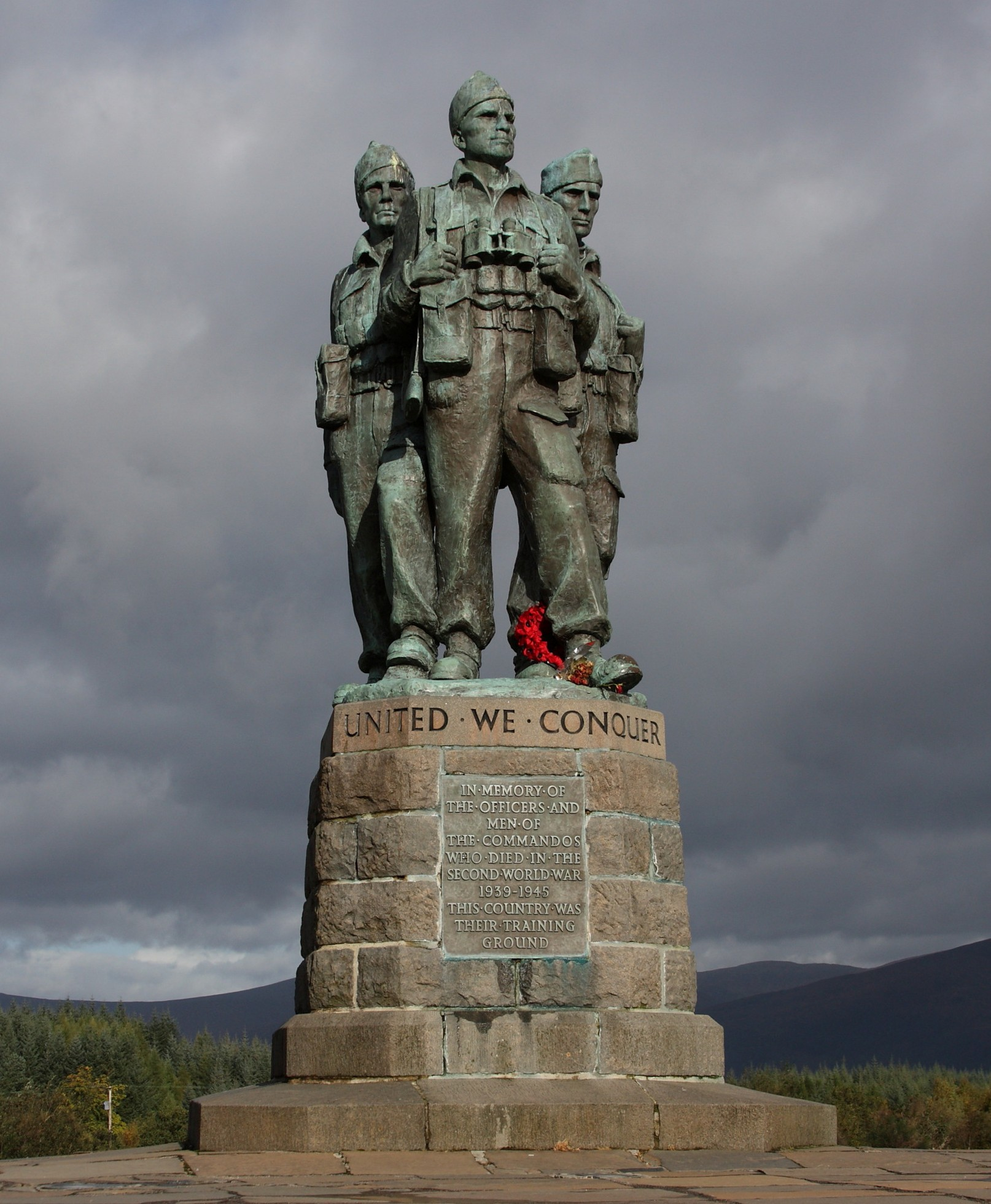
The Commando Memorial

Scott Sutherland DA, RSA, FRBS (15 May 1910 – 10 October 1984) was a Scottish sculptor, best known for the Commando Memorial in Spean Bridge. He was Head of Sculpture at Duncan of Jordanstone College of Art

== Life ==
Scott Sutherland was born in 1910, the son of David Sutherland, headmaster of West Banks School in Wick, Caithness and his wife Helen Ann Alan Scott and grew up there.

Scott's father was also an officer in the Highland Division and saw active service on the Western Front from 1915 to 1918. After the end of the war, he was appointed headmaster of Wick Academy, a post which he retained until he retired in 1938.

As a young man Scott was recognised as an able violinist, and he continued to play throughout his life.

He studied at Gray's School of Art from 1928 to 1929 and at Edinburgh College of Art from 1929 to 1933 under the supervision of Alexander Carrick, for whom he had a lifelong respect. He was a keen amateur boxer, and he frequently chose to portray sporting activities in his work throughout his life. He won a scholarship for his postgraduate year, and during this time he executed a bronze trophy for the Scottish Athletic Federation.

In 1933 he was awarded the Carnegie Travelling Scholarship, and went to Egypt, Greece and Italy. In 1934 he was awarded an Andrew Grant Travelling Scholarship which enabled him to continue his studies at the École des Beaux-Arts, privately with Jan et Joël Martel, and in the cathedral towns of France and Germany. In 1938 he made statues of Robert Burns, Thomas Carlyle and Walter Scott for the exterior of the Scottish Pavilion and a bronze birdbath entitled "Birdbath, Faun" for the Palace of Arts at the Empire Exhibition in Glasgow. He subsequently made portraits of the Duke of Portland and Sir Archibald Sinclair. In 1940 he won the Guthrie Award for the best work in the RSA Exhibition for a work entitled "Labor Vincit". After the outbreak of war Scott joined the army, serving for just over six years in anti-aircraft regiments. He qualified as a P.T. Instructor. In January 1942 he married Kenethina Hendry from Wick. He was able to exhibit at the RSA in 1944, choosing military topics: Man-Handling and Grenade Thrower.

In November 1945, Scott was appointed Modelling and Sculpture Master in Belfast Technical College. In 1947 he was appointed Instructor in Modelling at Dundee Institute of Art and Technology, initially on a temporary basis. The Commandos were established in 1940, and after the war they felt the need for a memorial of their own, to be erected near Achnacarry, their training ground. In a competition restricted to sculptors of Scottish nationality or Scottish residence with six entries Scott won the first prize. Scott was elected ARSA in 1950. The memorial was cast by H.H. Martyn & Co. in Cheltenham and unveiled by the Queen Mother on 27 September 1952. The 1/3 model for the sculpture was given to the museum for No. 4 Commando in Normandy by Donald Gilchrist.

In addition to his teaching duties, Scott also demonstrated his skill in practical demonstrations at local art societies and sometimes completed and exhibited the resulting work. The coat of arms above the entrance to the National Library of Scotland, which was opened in 1956 was carved by Scott.

When the Caird Hall was built in the early 20th Century, the previous Town House, known as the Pillars, designed by William Adam in 1734 was demolished. A plaque was made by Scott to commemorate this building and it is sited in City Square.

On 24 January 1959, a statue of Robert Burns, carved in stone by Scott was unveiled in Arbroath by the Earl of Airlie. On 15 October of the same year, a memorial to the memory of all ranks of the 4th and 5th Dundee and Angus Battalions of the Black Watch sculpted by Scott and erected on Powrie Brae near Dundee was unveiled by the Queen Mother. In 1961 Scott was elected FRBS.

HMS Cochrane was the name given to the Rosyth naval base between 1968 and 1996. It was named after Admiral Cochrane who came from Culross. Scott was invited to make a bust of the Admiral and it was situated at the main gate. The bust is currently in Culross.

Hercules Linton, designer of the Cutty Sark was born in Inverbervie. Scott was invited to create a memorial to him in his home town. It was unveiled by Sir Francis Chichester in 1969 and won a Saltire Society commendation. Despite local objections, Aberdeenshire Council chose to have the statue replaced.

In 1970 Scott was elected to be an academician of the RSA. As was customary, he submitted a work to the Diploma Collection. He chose a bust of his daughter Alayne.

General Accident was, for many years based in the City of Perth. It was led for many years by Sir Francis Norie-Miller. In due course, his son Stanley followed him into the business and played a leading role. In 1971 a riverside walk was established by the directors and staff of the company in honour of Sir Stanley. It includes an art trail. Scott created a sculpture of some leaping salmon for the park, but it was vandalised.

The unicorn on the Mercat cross in Dundee was very badly weathered, and Scott provided a replacement in cold-cast bronze.

Air Chief Marshal Hugh Dowding was born in Moffat in Dumfries and Galloway. The inhabitants of the town decided to erect a memorial to him, and Scott created the central plaque for D. Bruce Walker who designed the setting in local sandstone. It was unveiled in 1972.

Scott retired in 1975, but despite ill health, he continued to be productive and managed to maintain his contact with the art college for a number of years.

Scott made a silver trophy which was presented to the Queen by the Royal Observer Corps presumably on the occasion of her Silver Jubilee in 1977. He also made a trophy for tossing the caber which was presented at the Braemar Highland Games.

The Broughty Ferry lifeboat Mona capsized in December 1959, resulting in the loss of her entire crew of eight men. In about 1978 Scott made the carved slate memorial for the lifeboat station. It demonstrates his meticulous approach to lettering.

Perched at the end of the ridge of a roof of the primary school in Kenmore sits a bronze Capercaillie modelled by Scott, in a style reminiscent of Alexander Carrick's contributions to the Animal Wall.

He died on 10 October 1984 at King's Cross Hospital, Dundee.

== Gallery ==
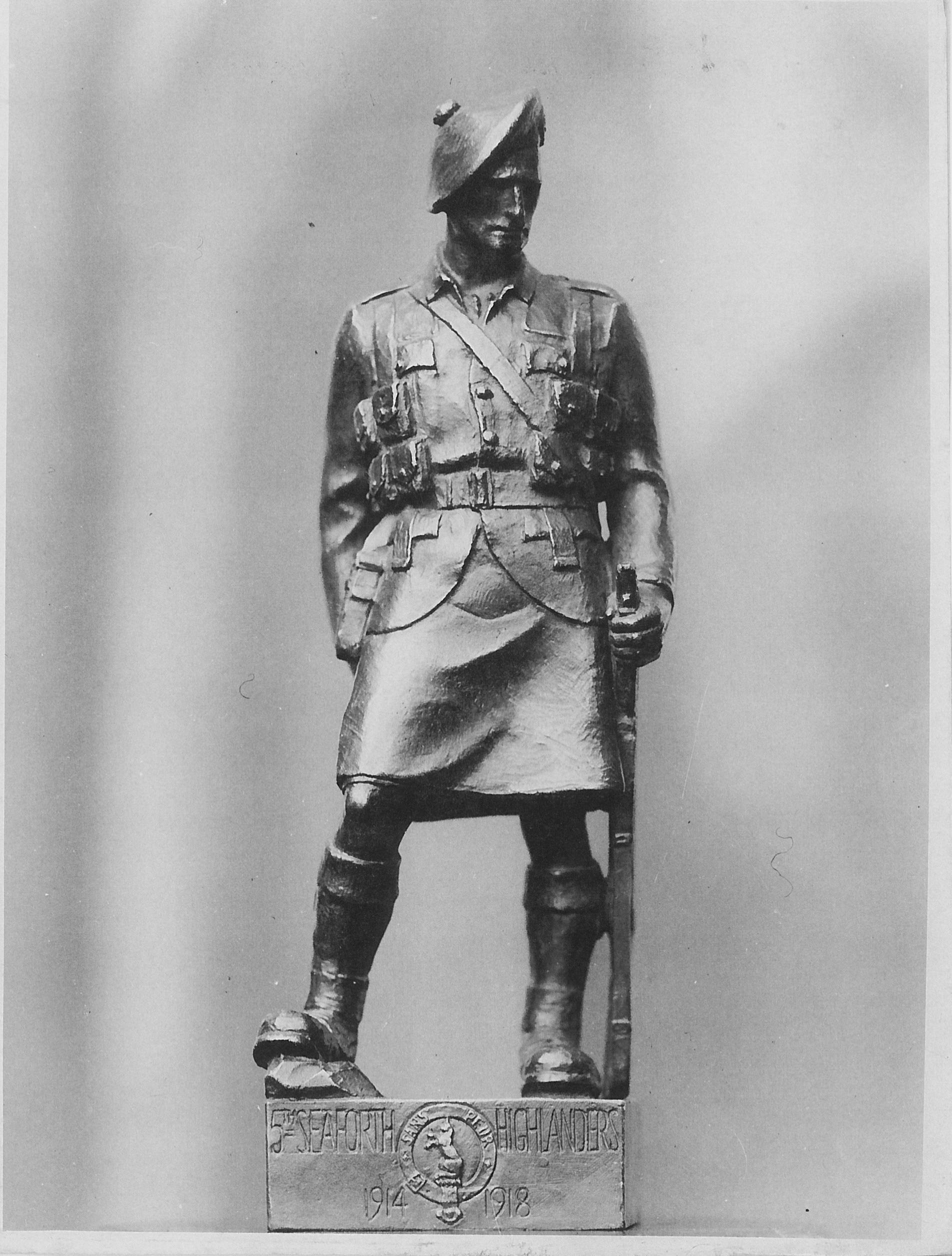
a maquette for a memorial to the 5th Seaforth Highlanders in which his father served during the First World War

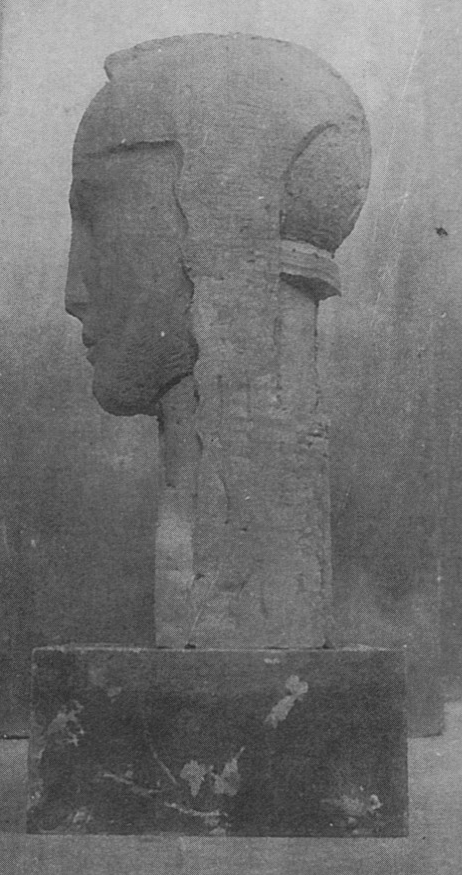
Bust made in Martel studio

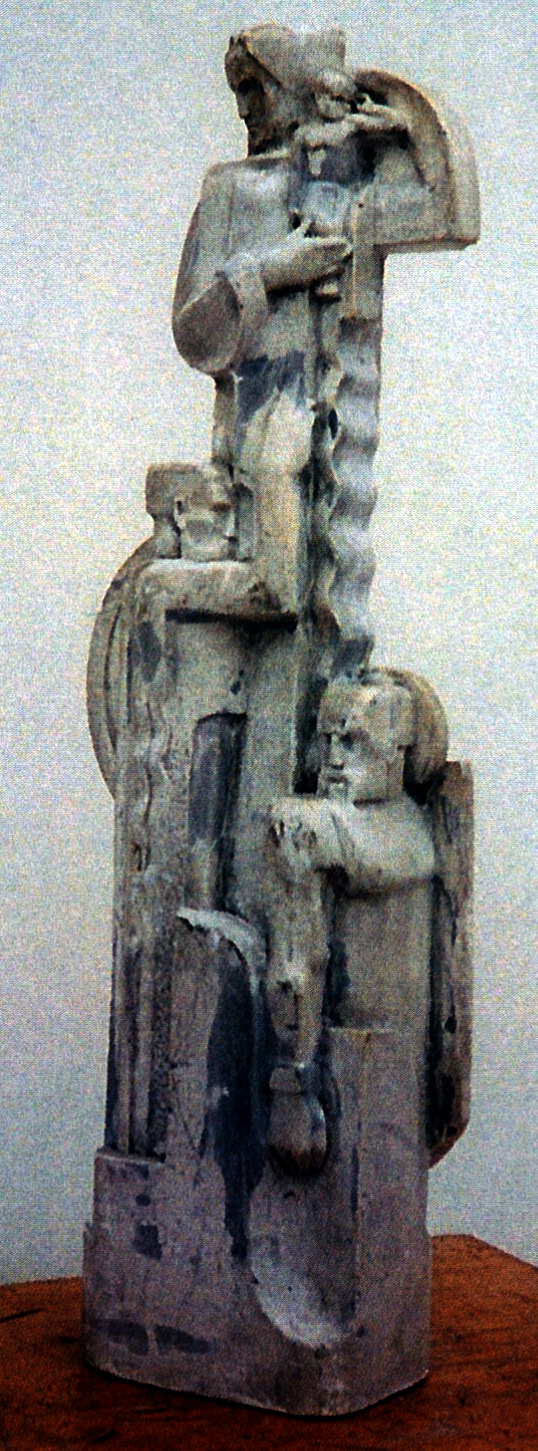
Adoration

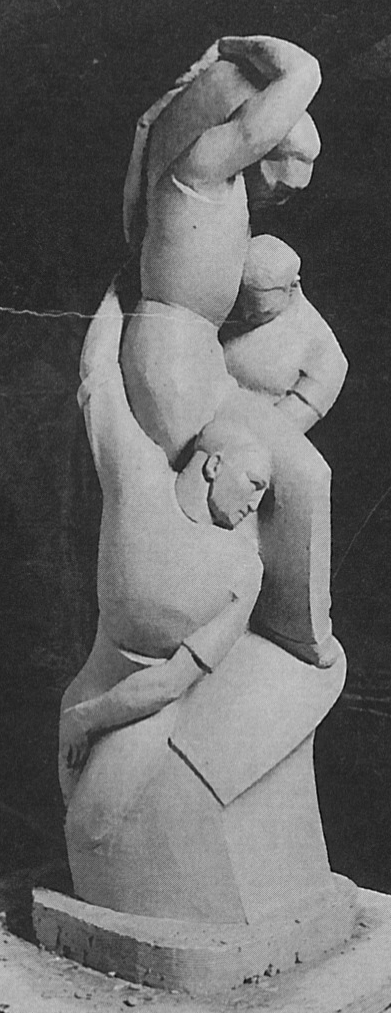
Unity

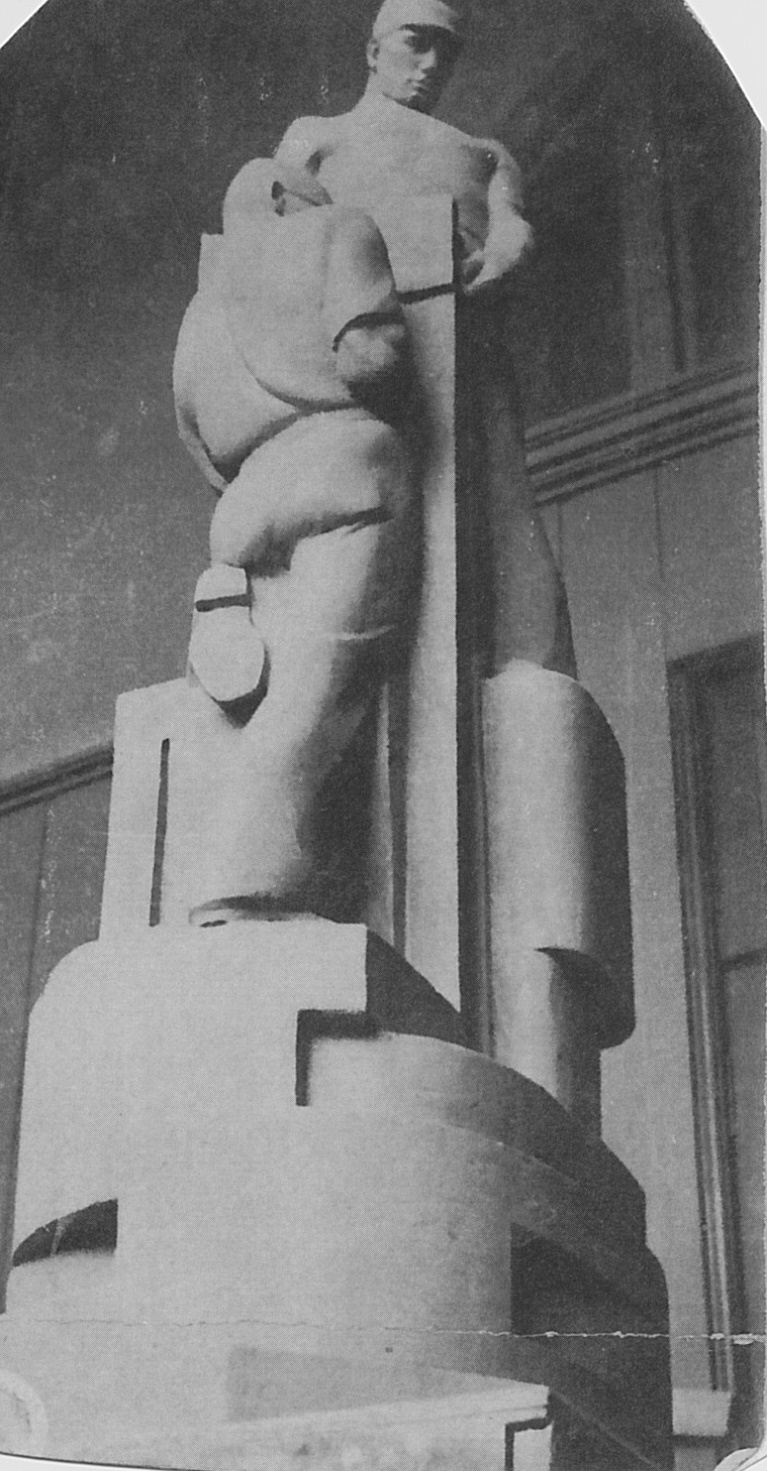
Riveters

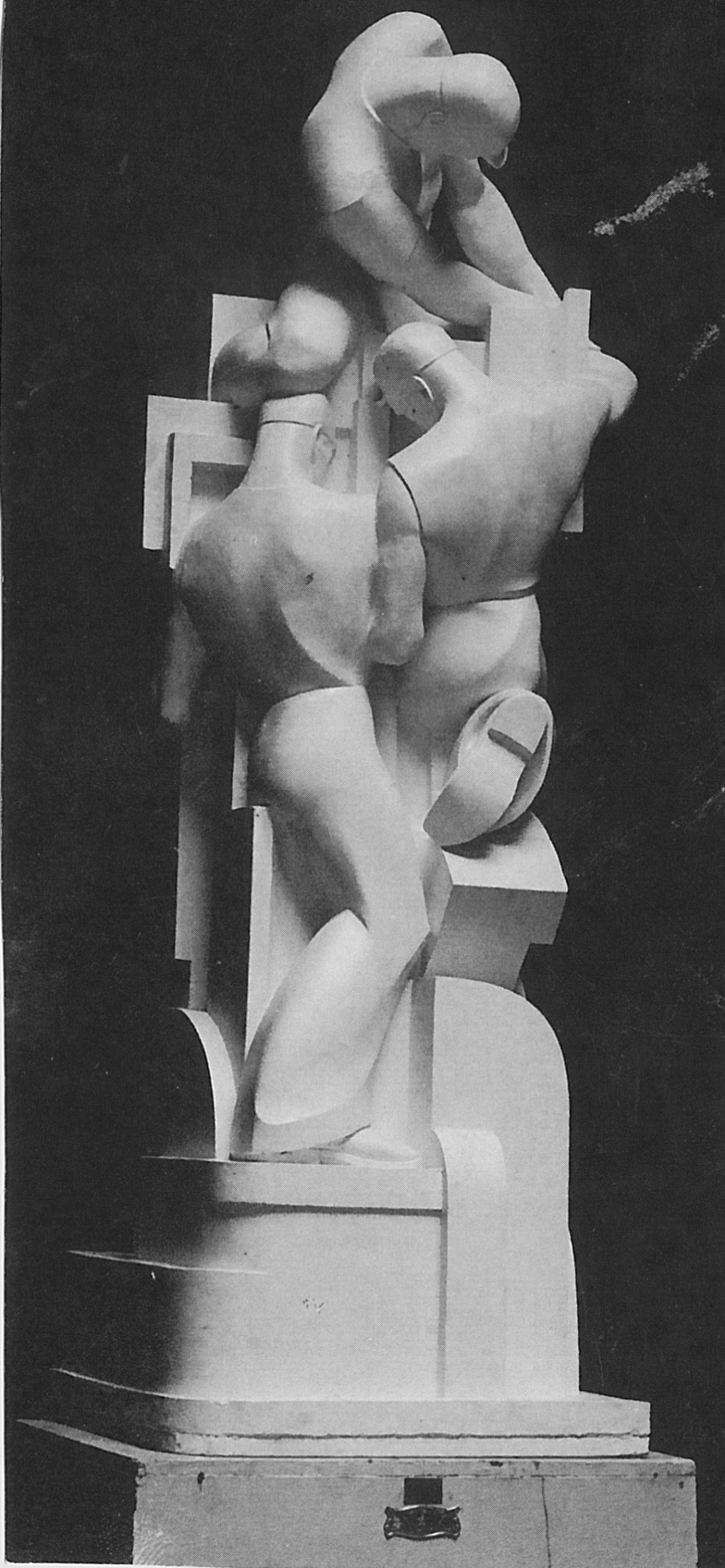
Labor Vincit

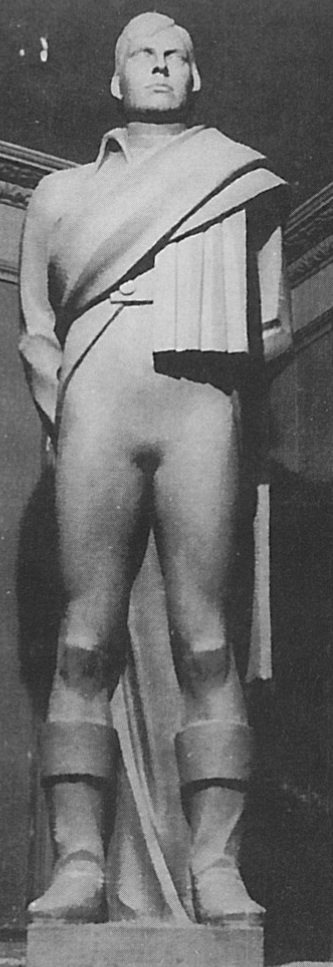
Robert Burns

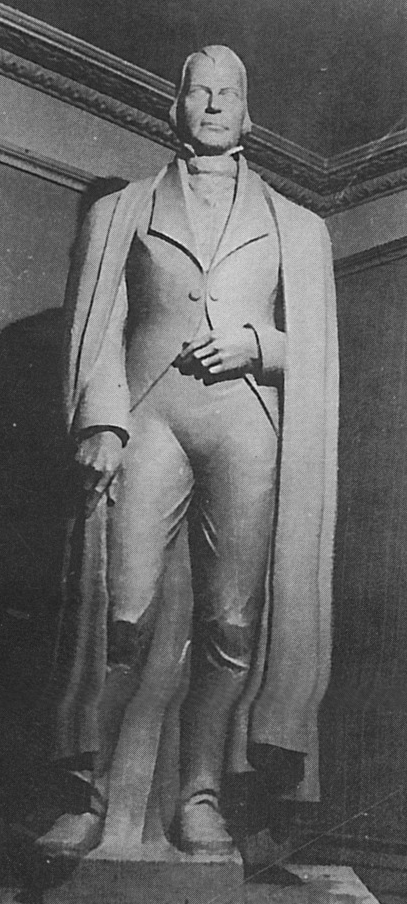
Walter Scott.

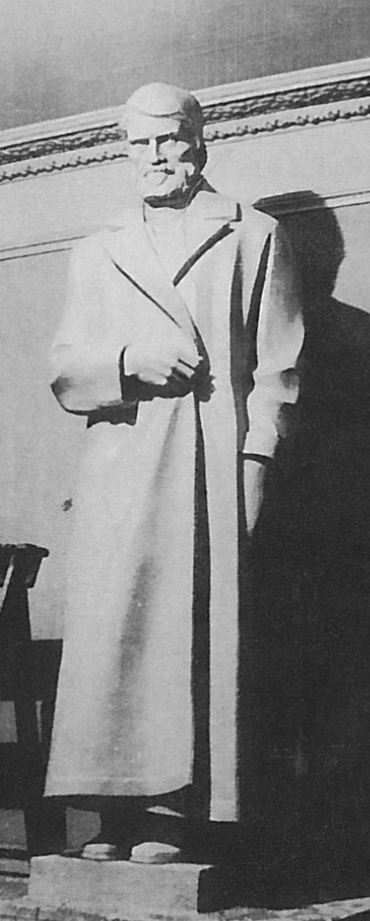
Thomas Carlyle

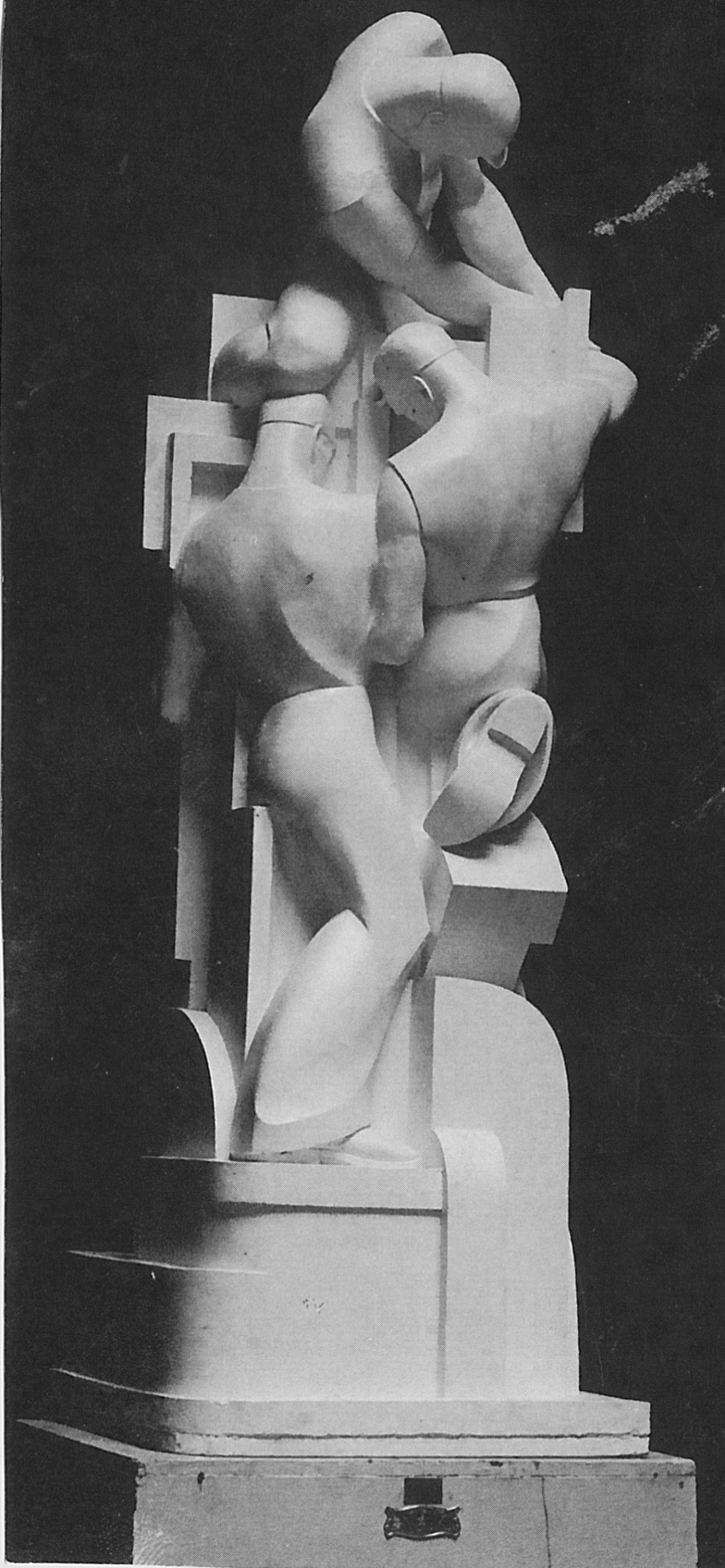
Labor Vincit, winner of Guthrie Prize

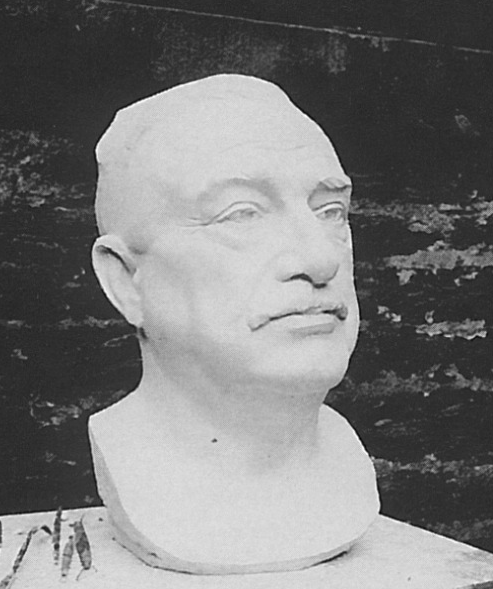
Duke of Portland

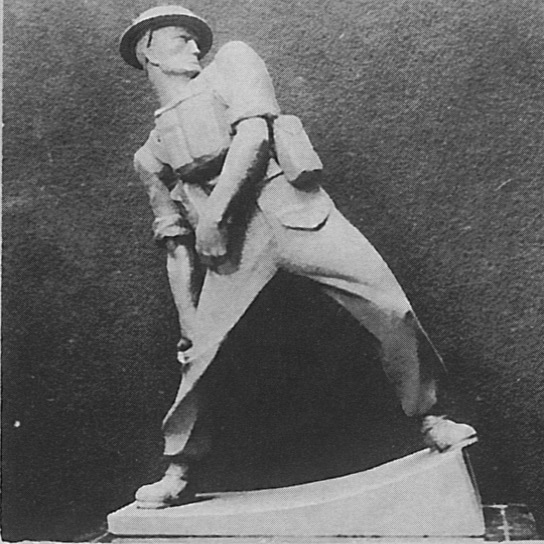
Grenade Thrower

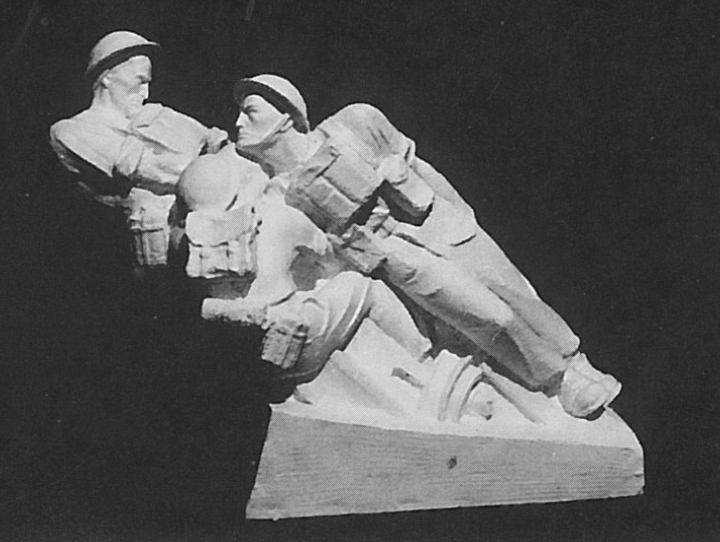
Man Handling

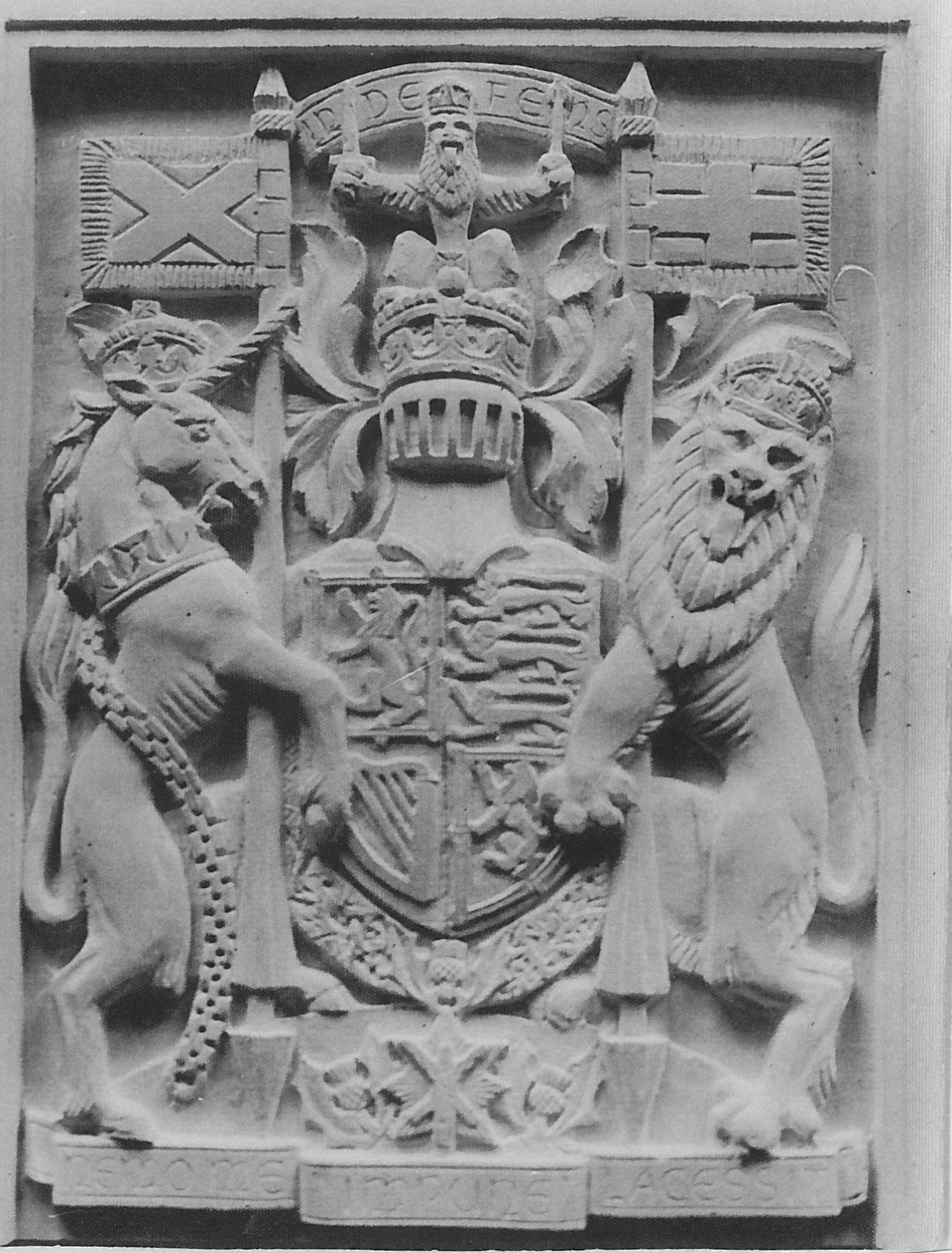
National Library of Scotland

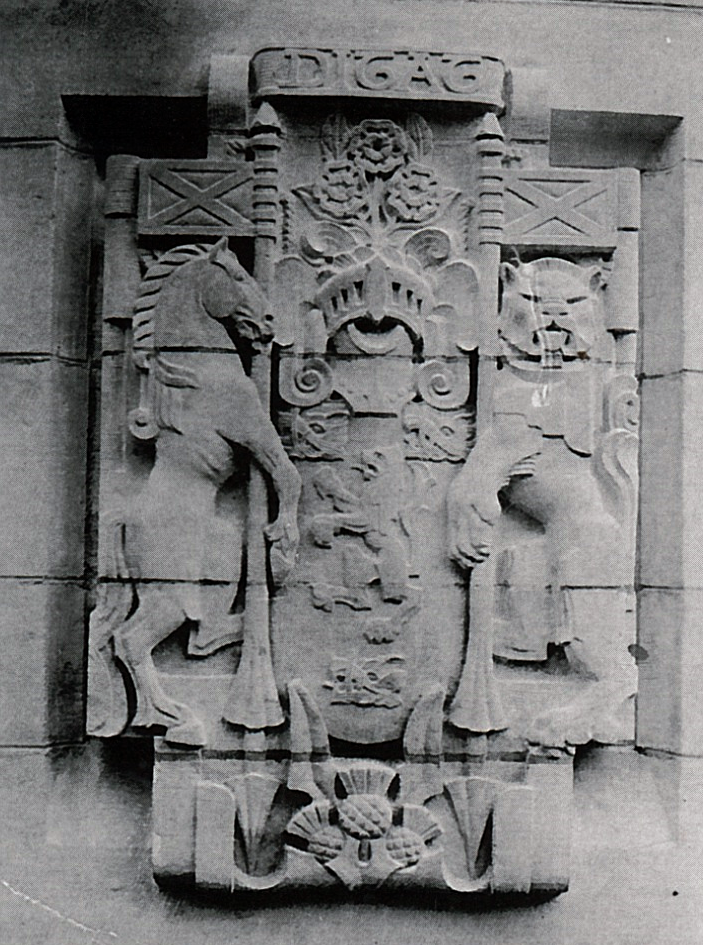
Scottish coat of arms - location unknown

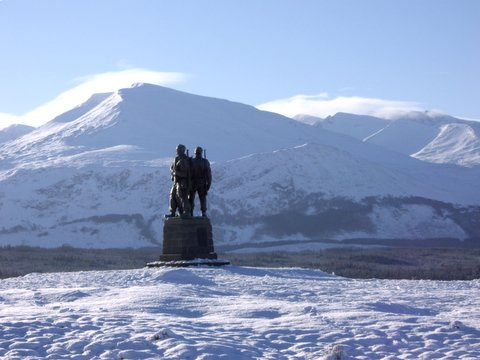
Commando Memorial, Spean Bridge

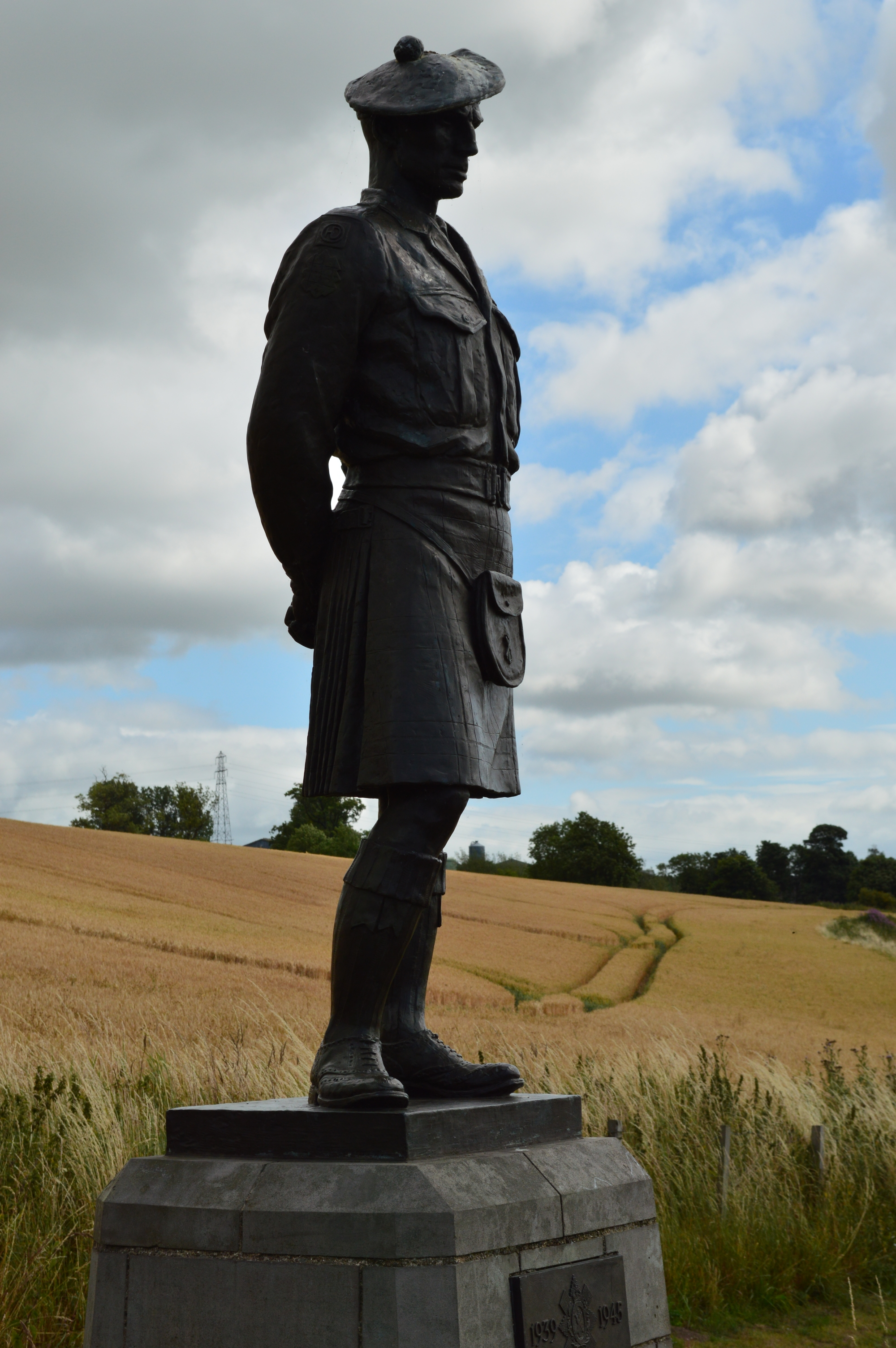
Black Watch Memorial, Powrie Brae near Dundee

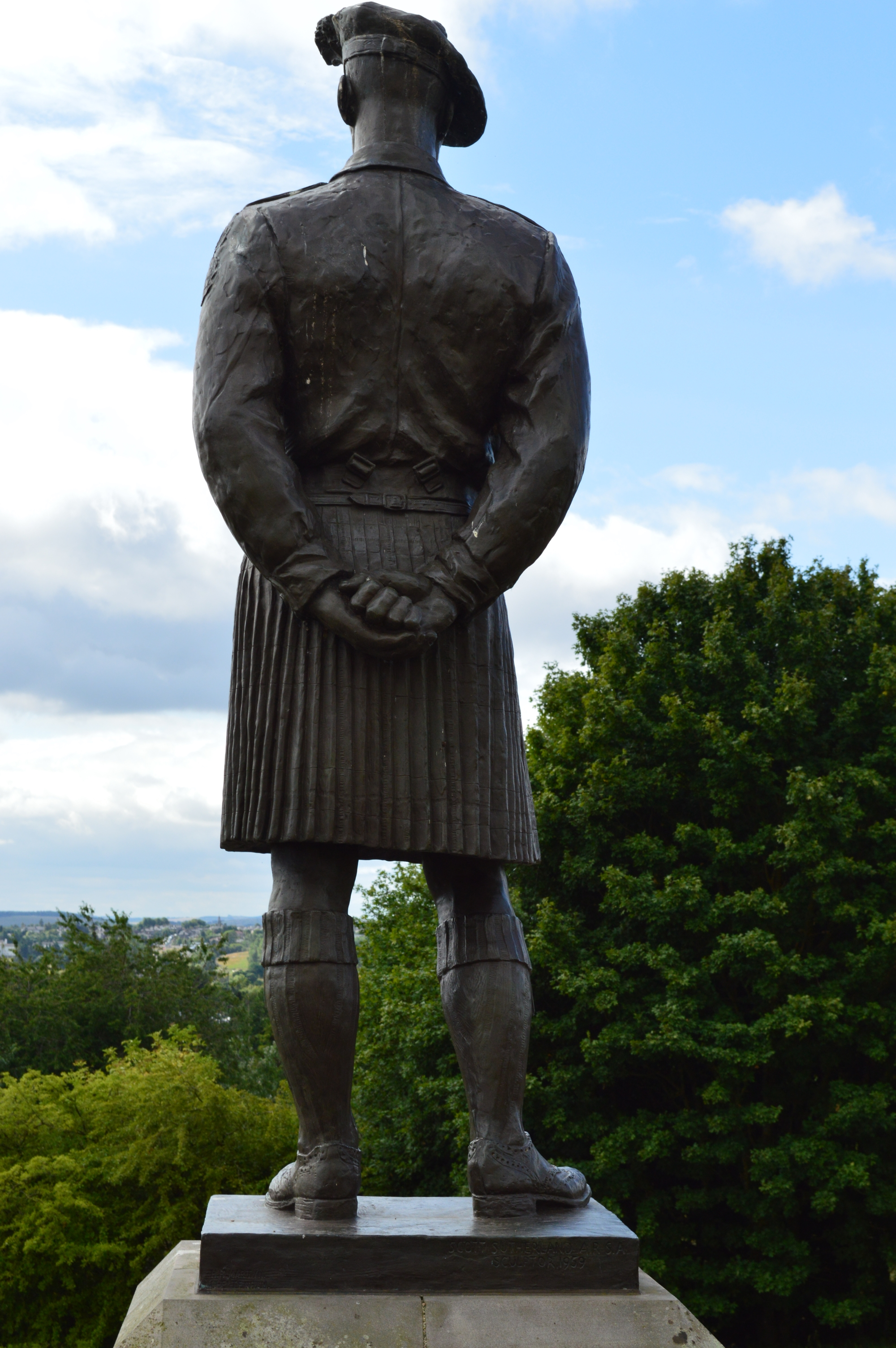
Black Watch Memorial, view from rear

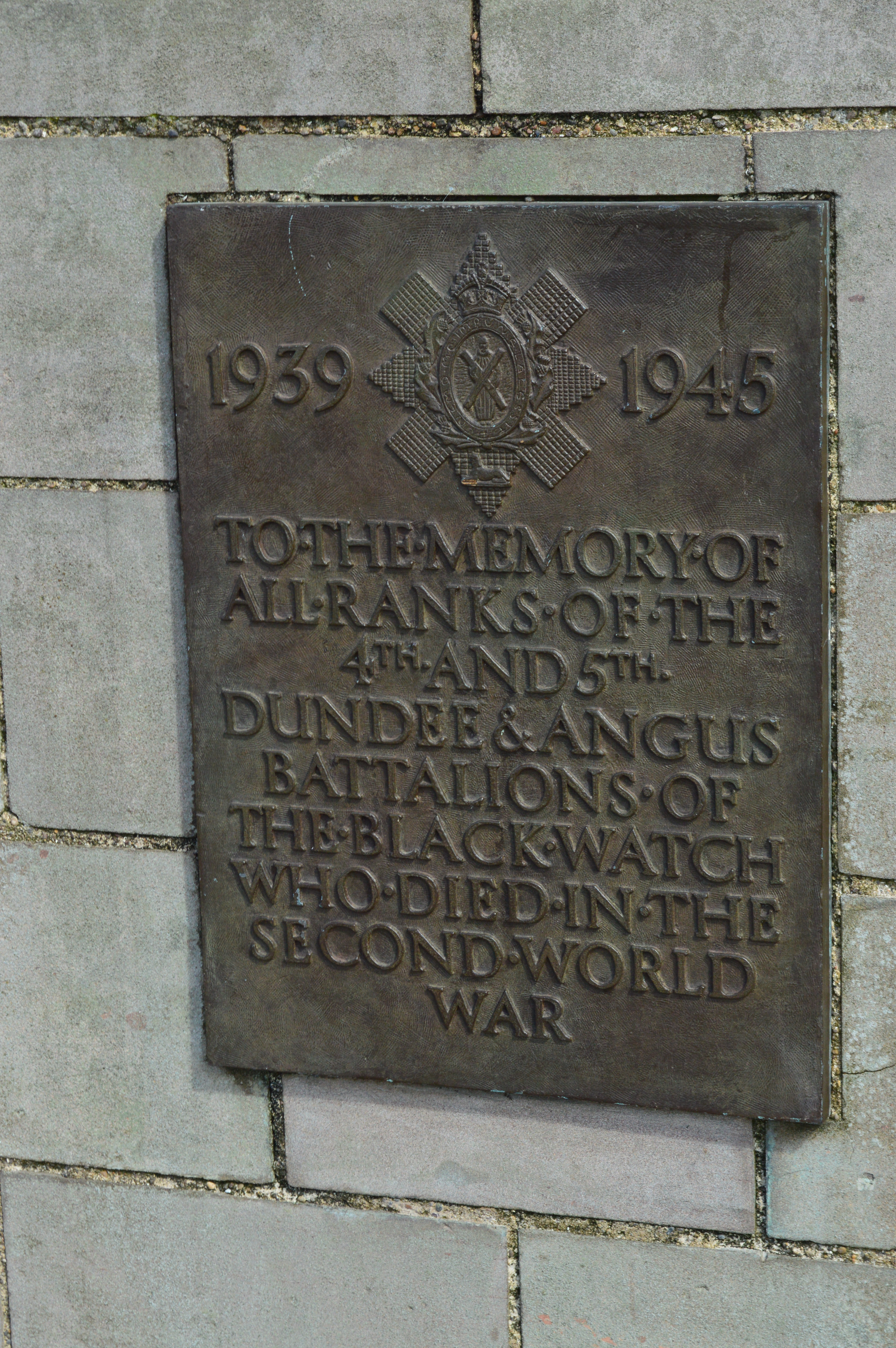
Black Watch Memorial, plaque

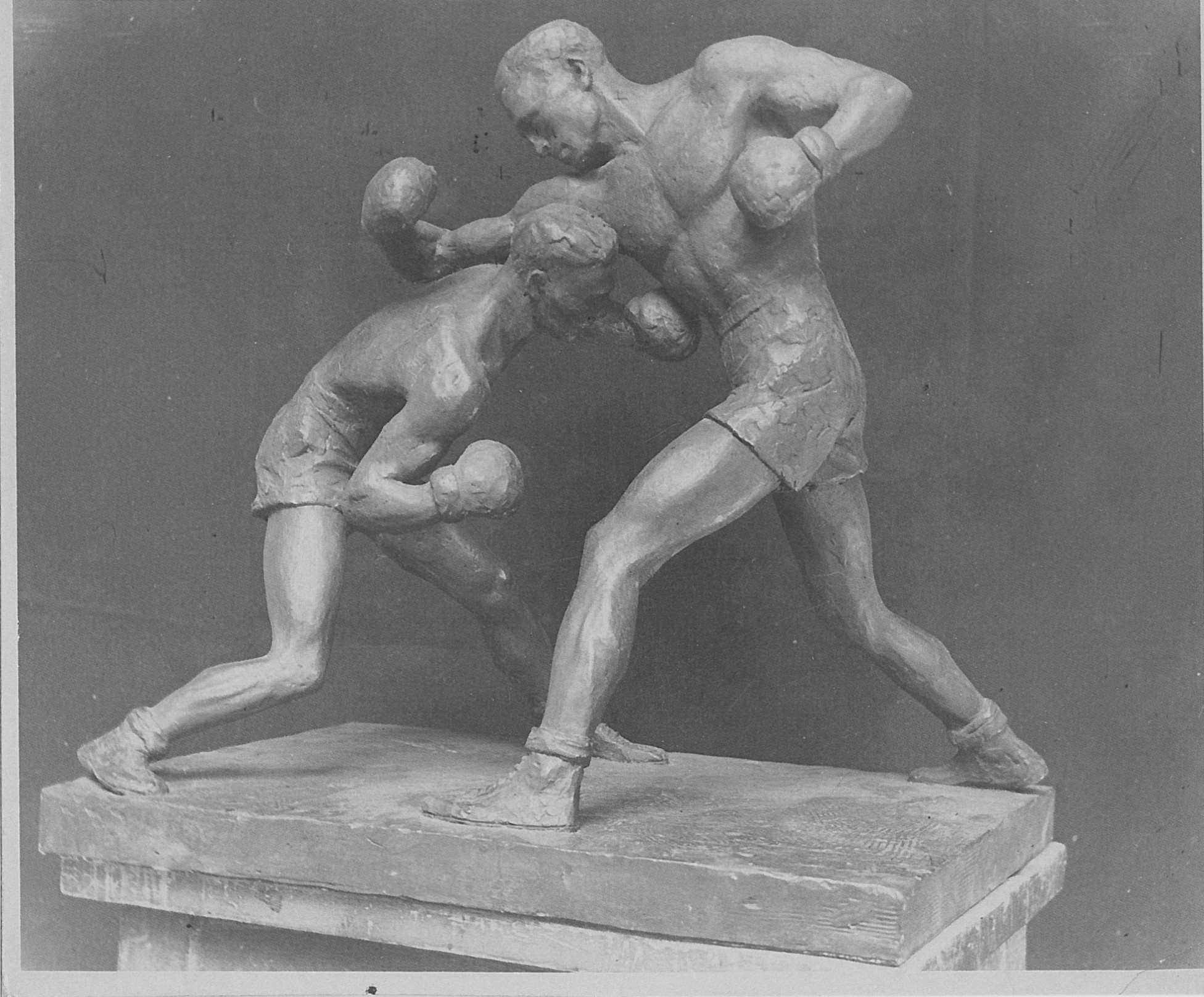
Boxers

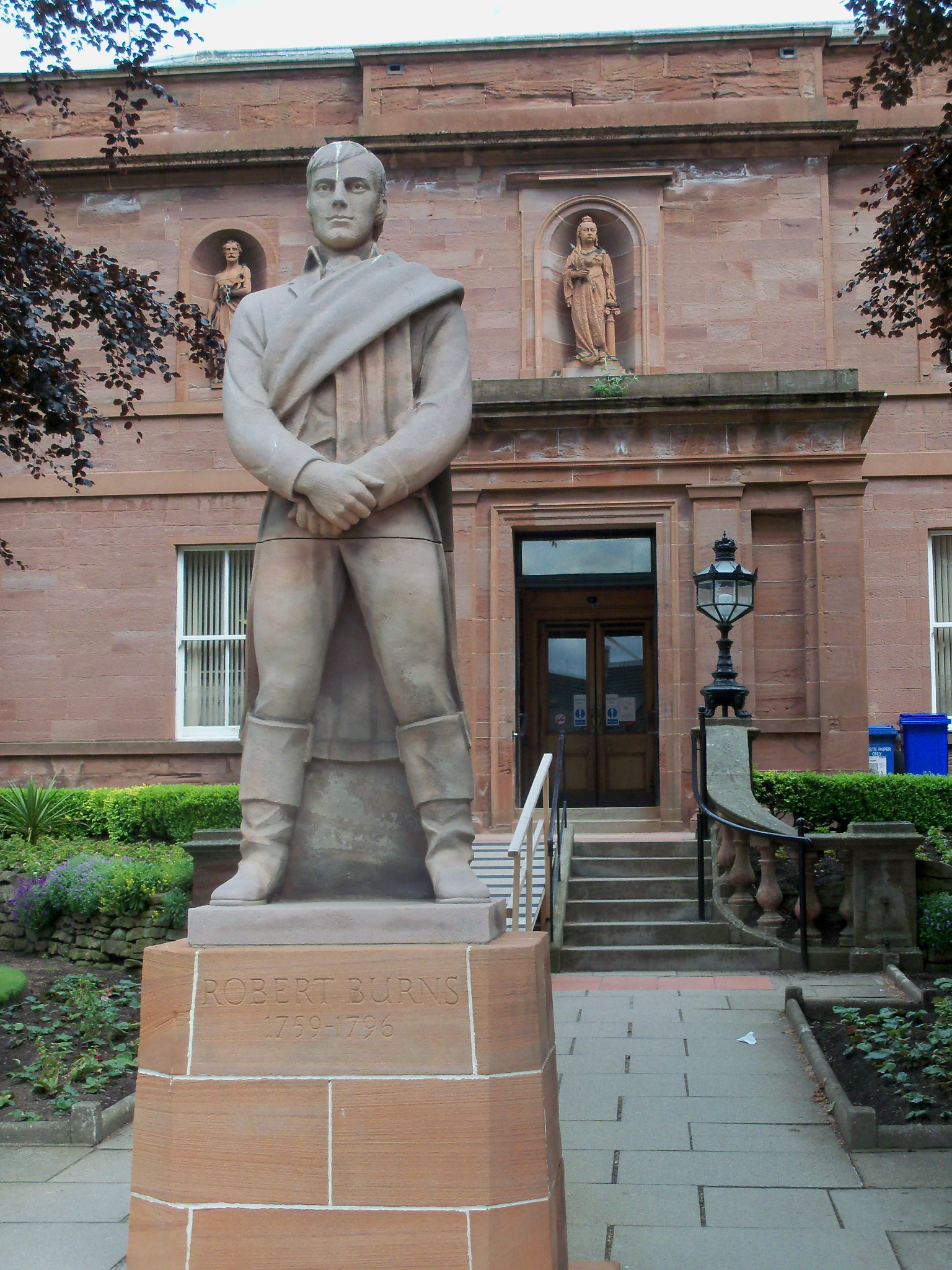
Robert Burns, Arbroath.

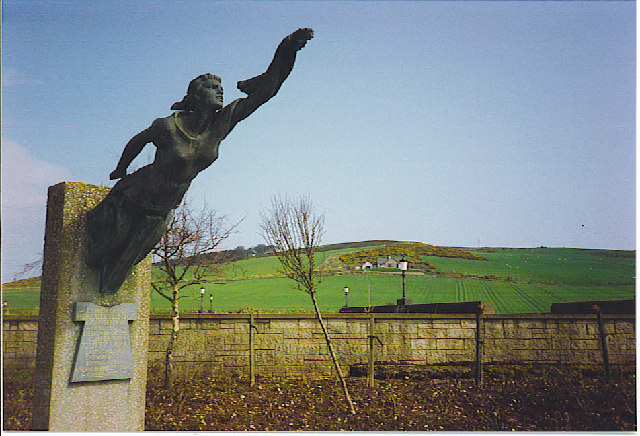
Cutty Sark, Inverbervie

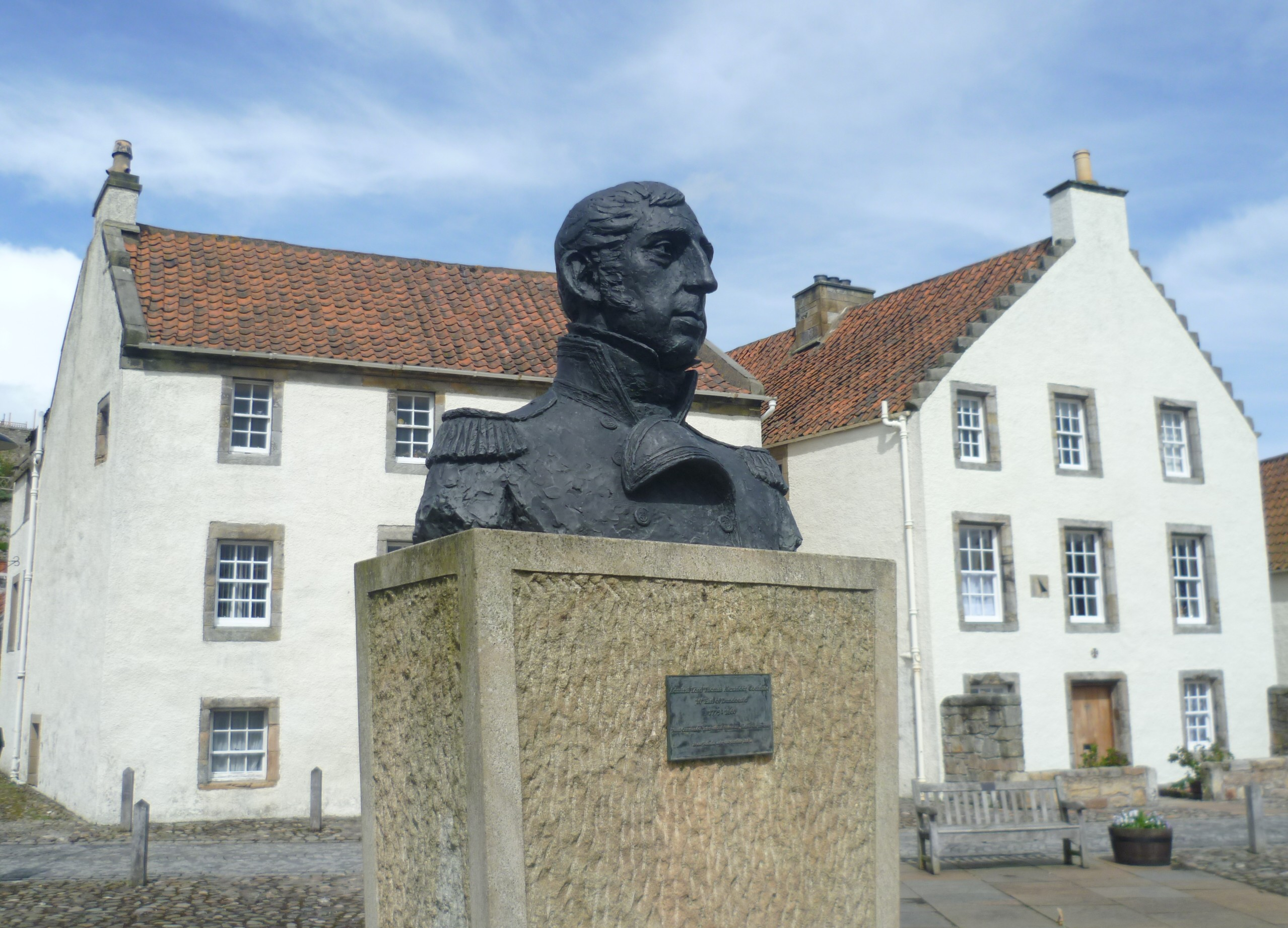
Admiral Cochrane, Culross

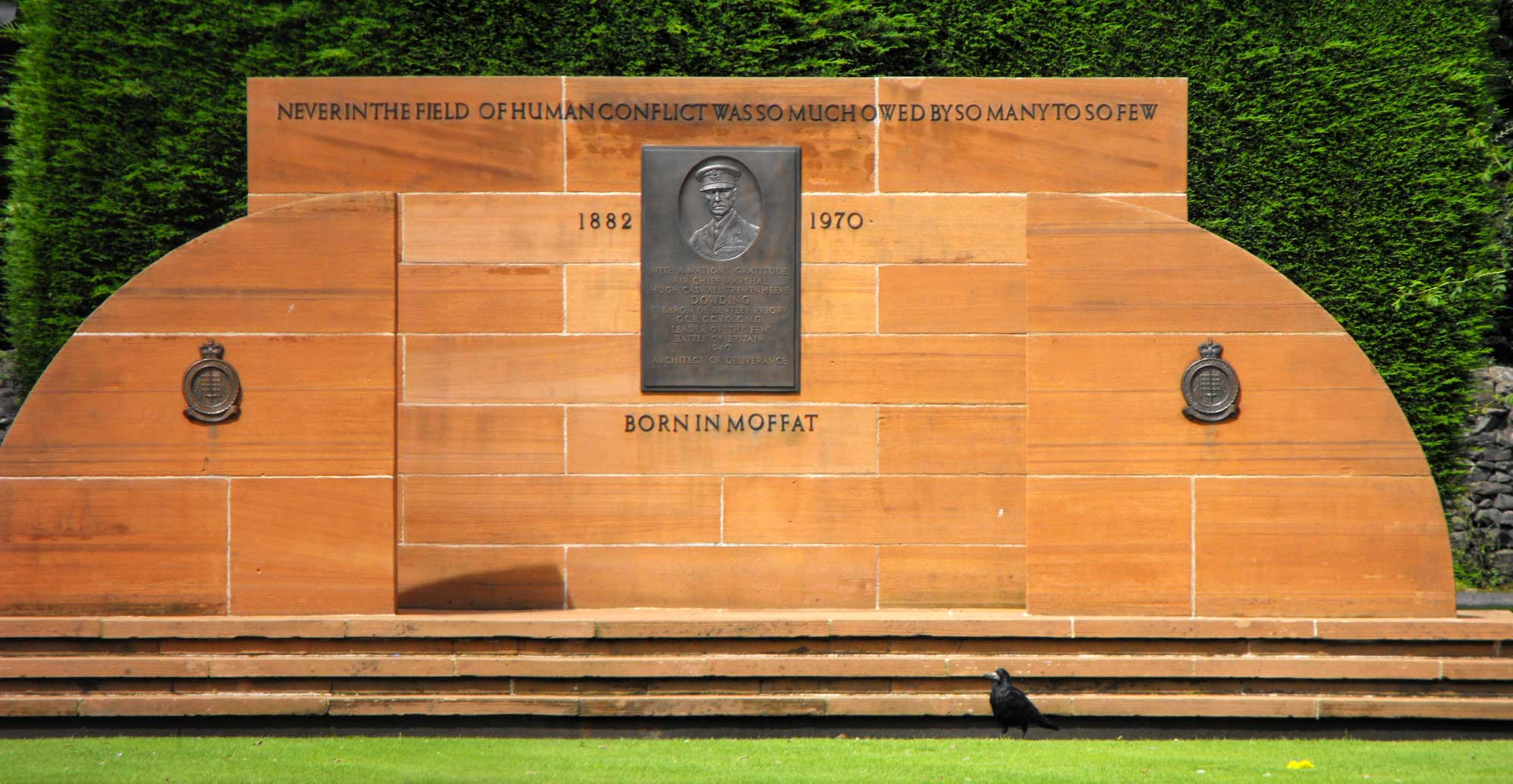
Plaque in Dowding Memorial, Moffat

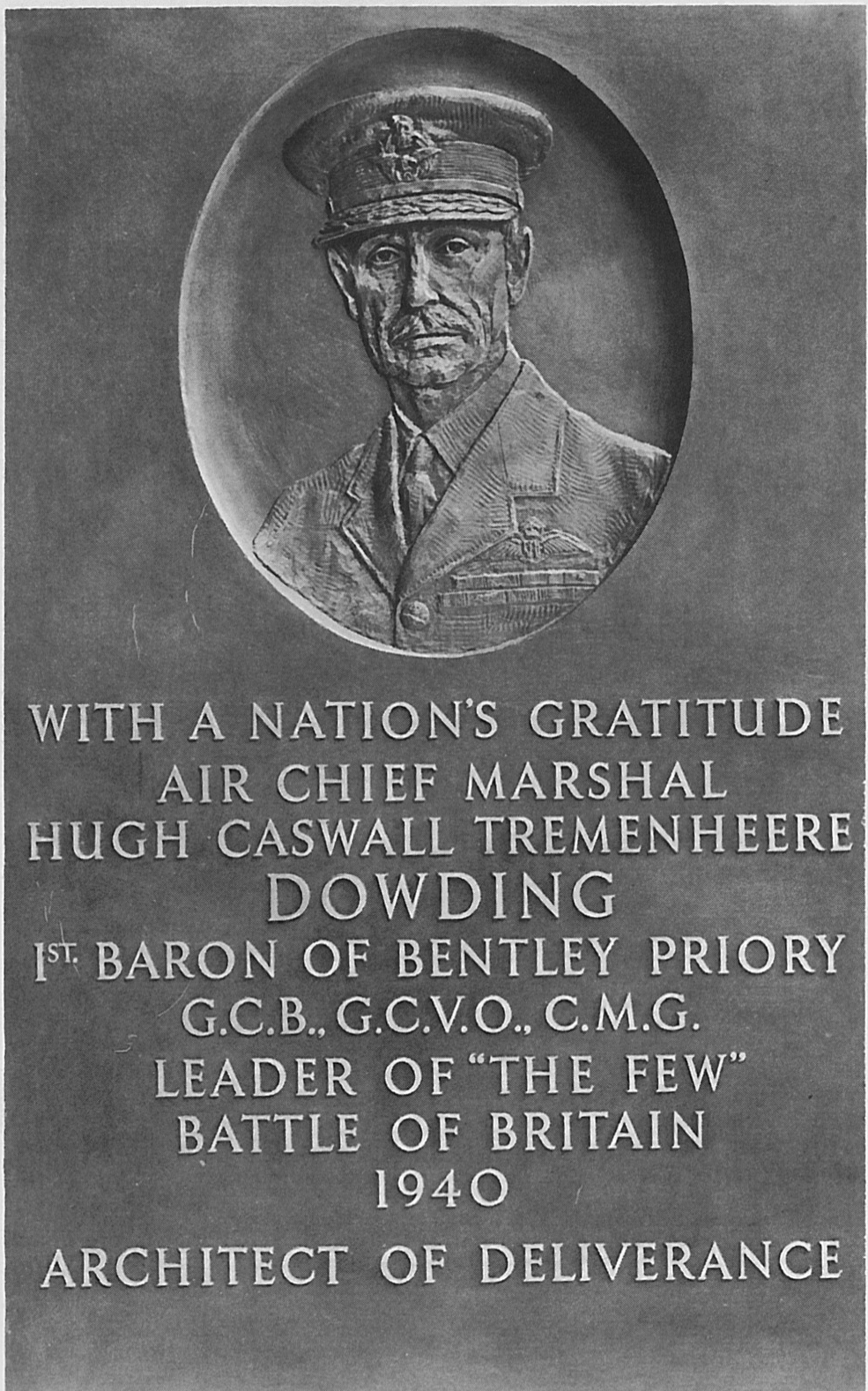
Dowding panel

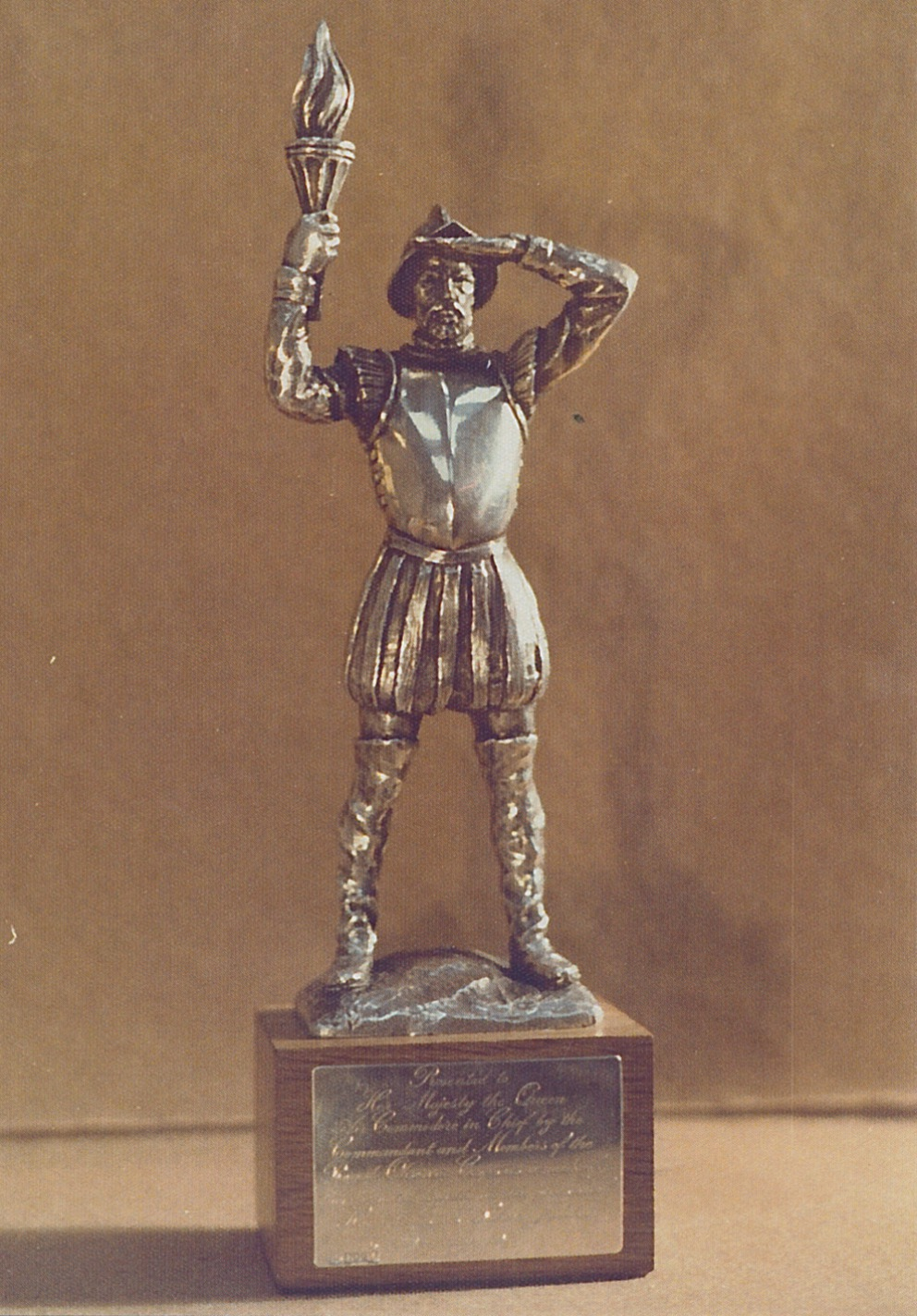
Royal Observer Corps. Trophy

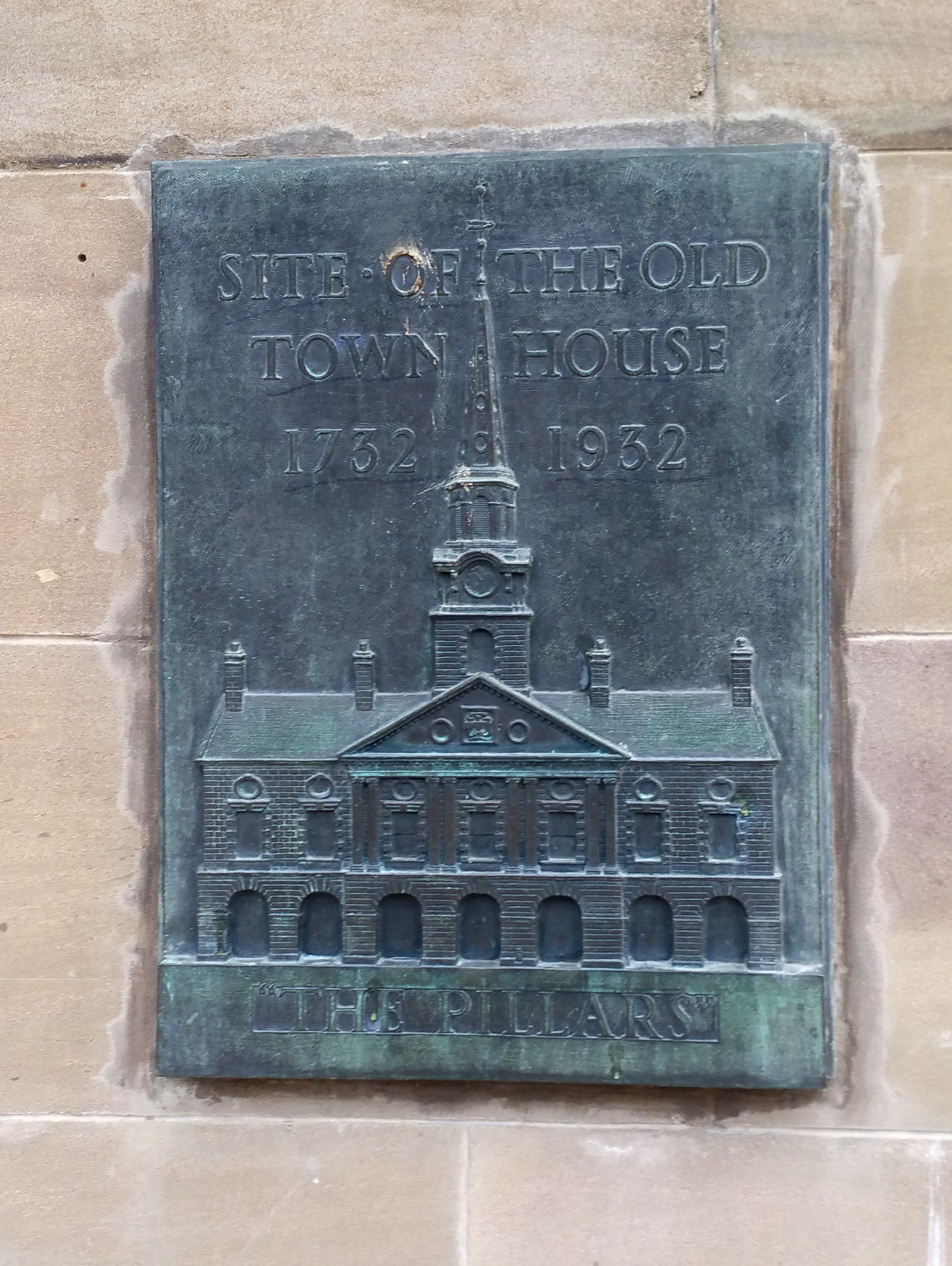
Plaque commemorating the old town house which was demolished to make way for the Caird Hall

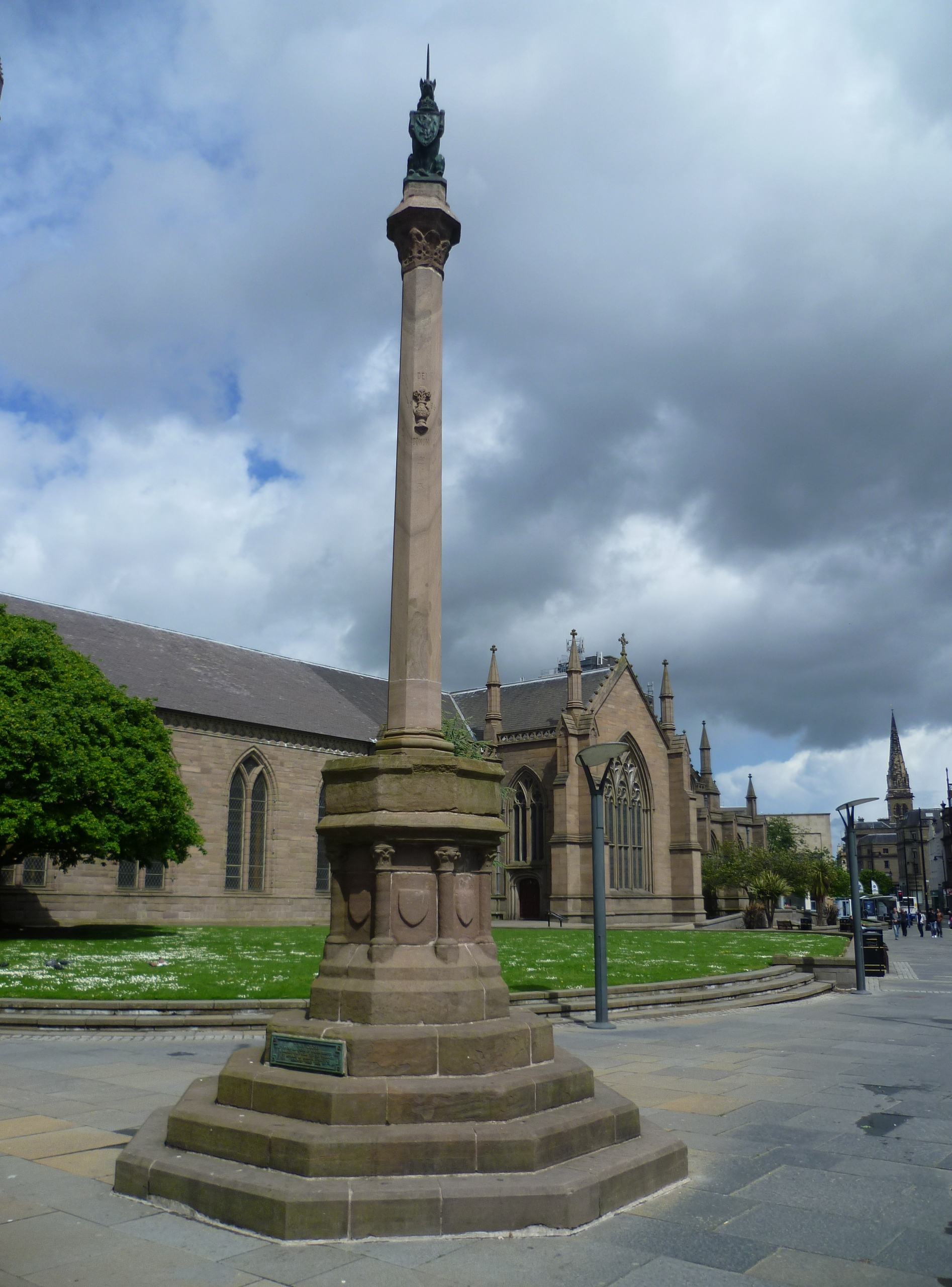
Mercat Cross, Dundee

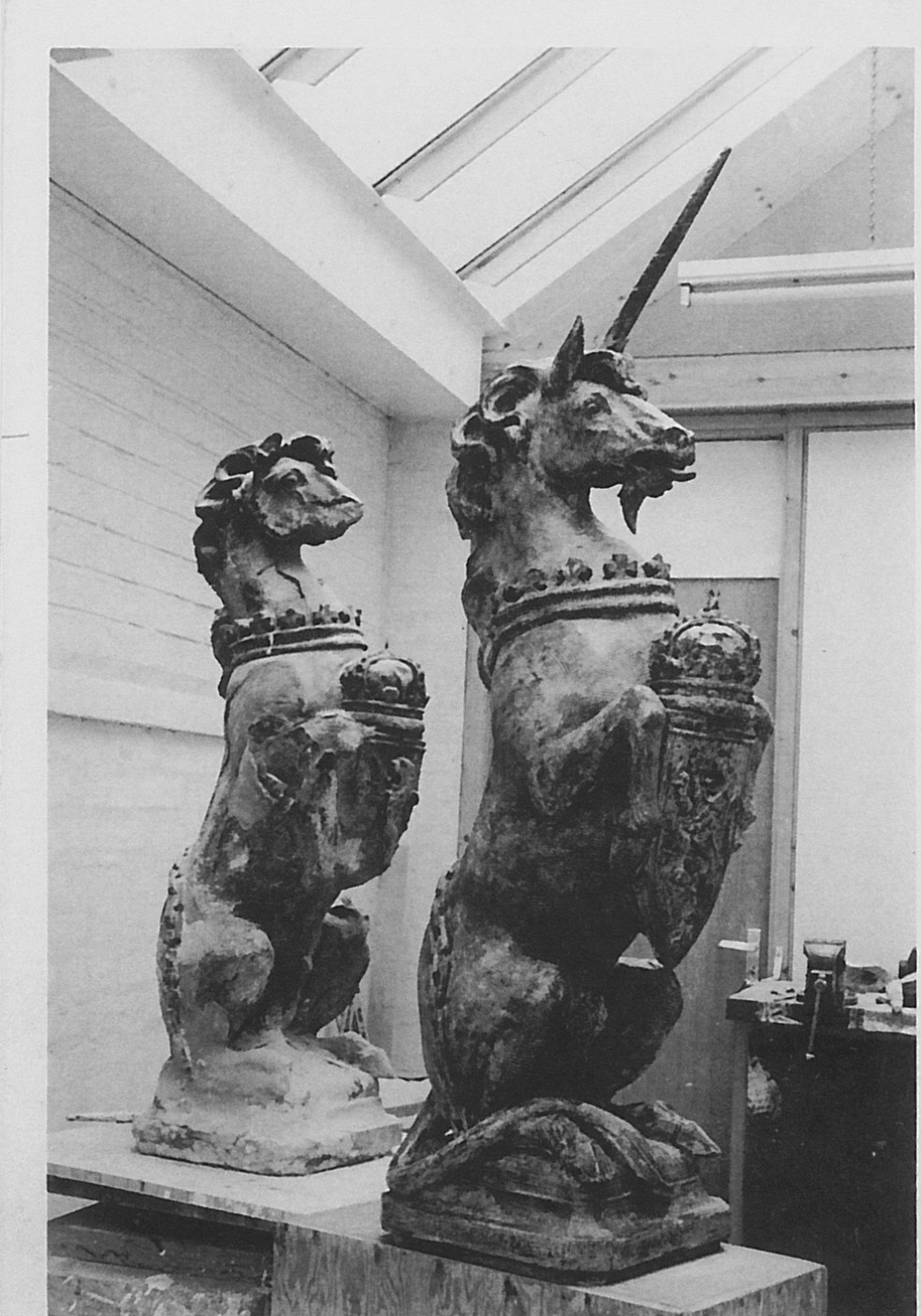
Weathered unicorn and its replacement

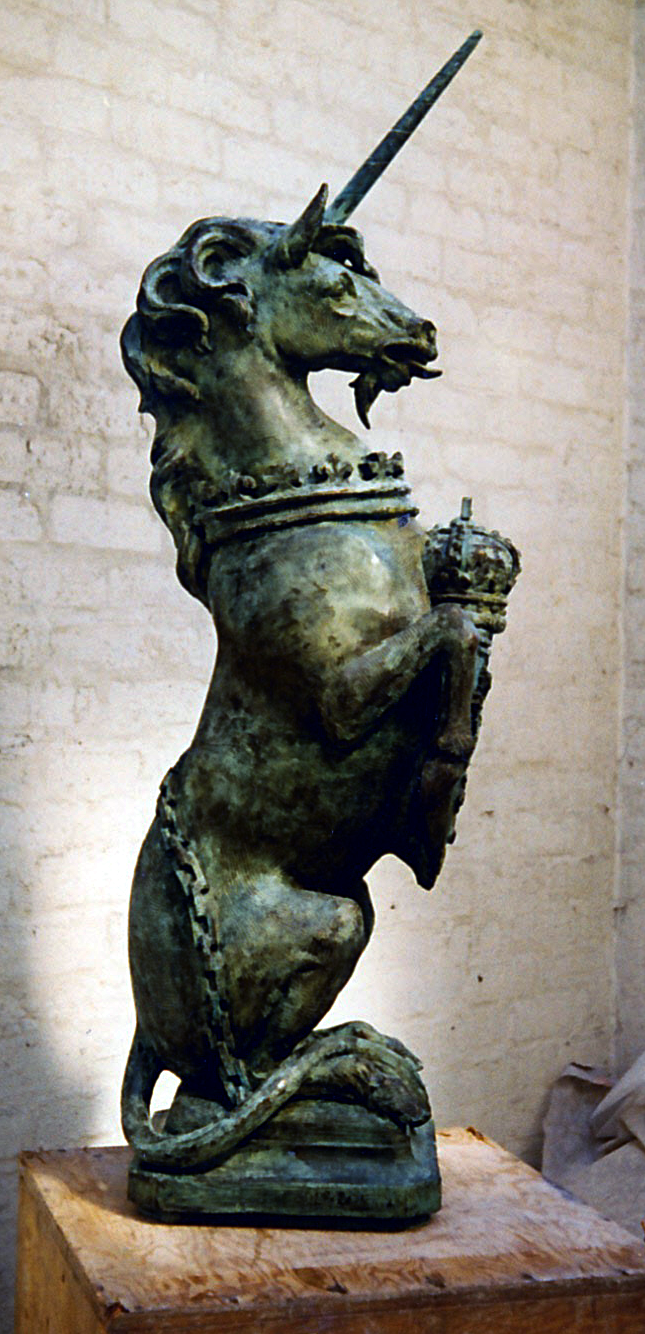
Mercat Cross Unicorn

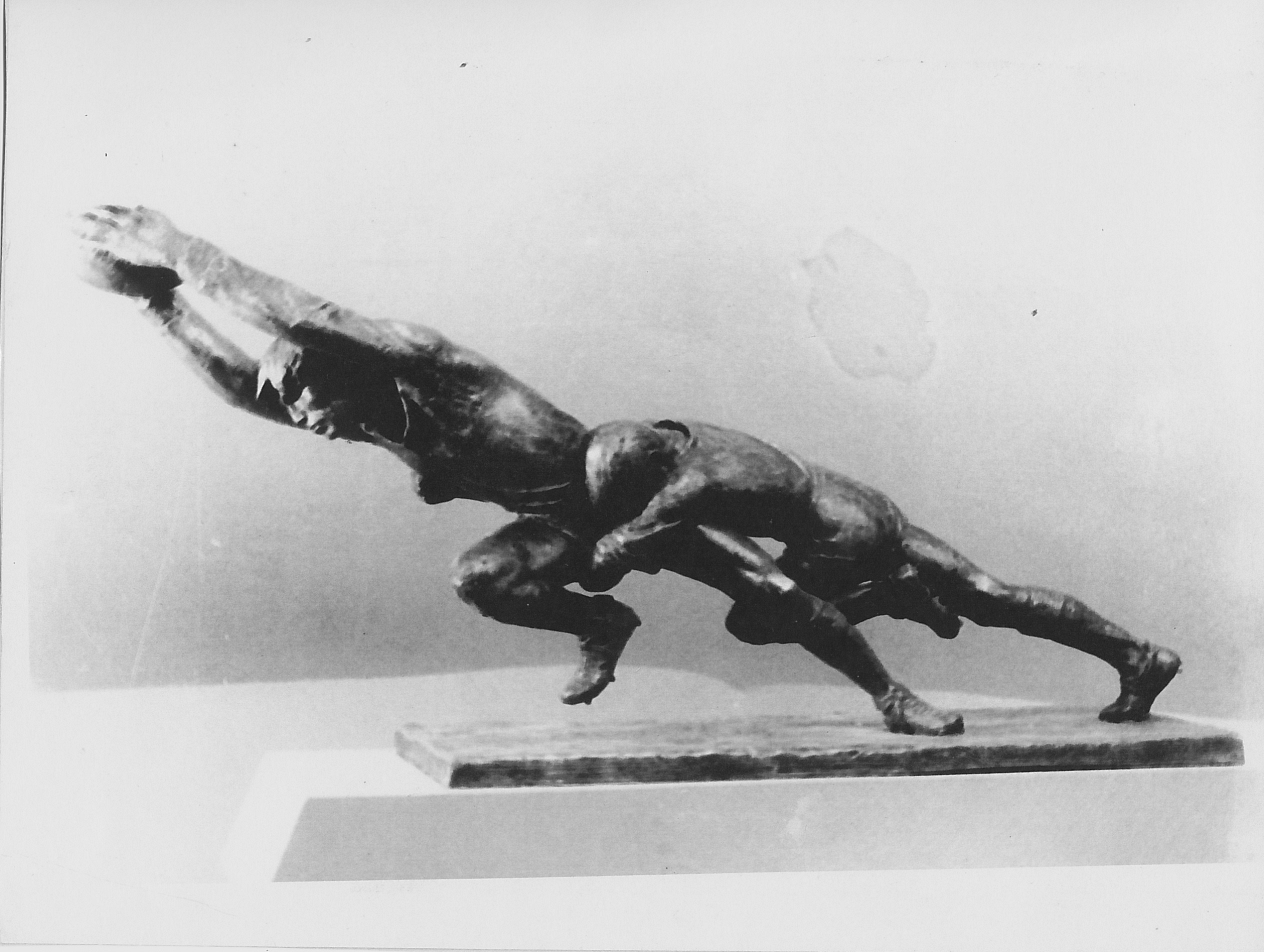
Rugby Tackle

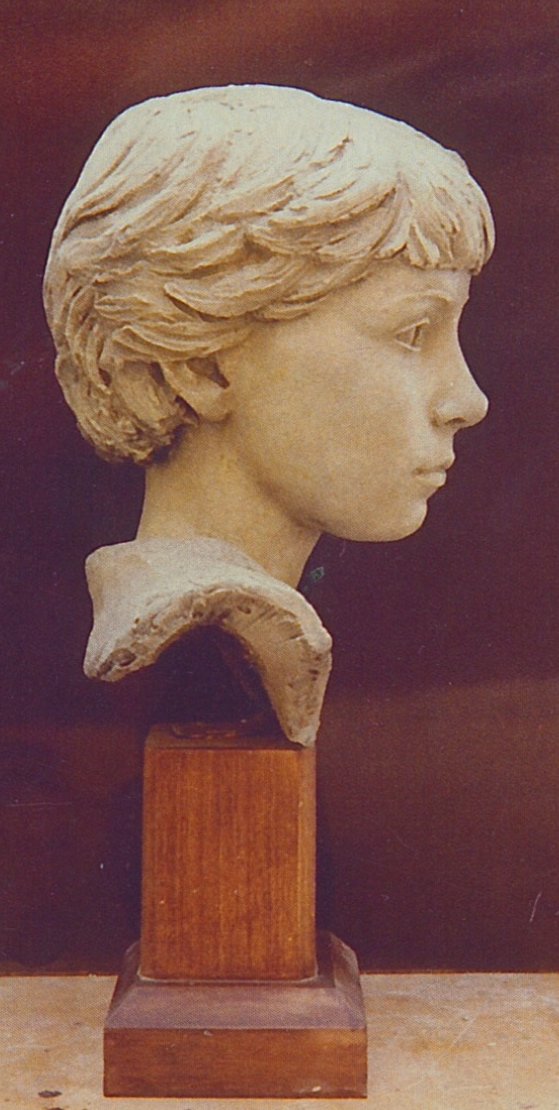
Alayne

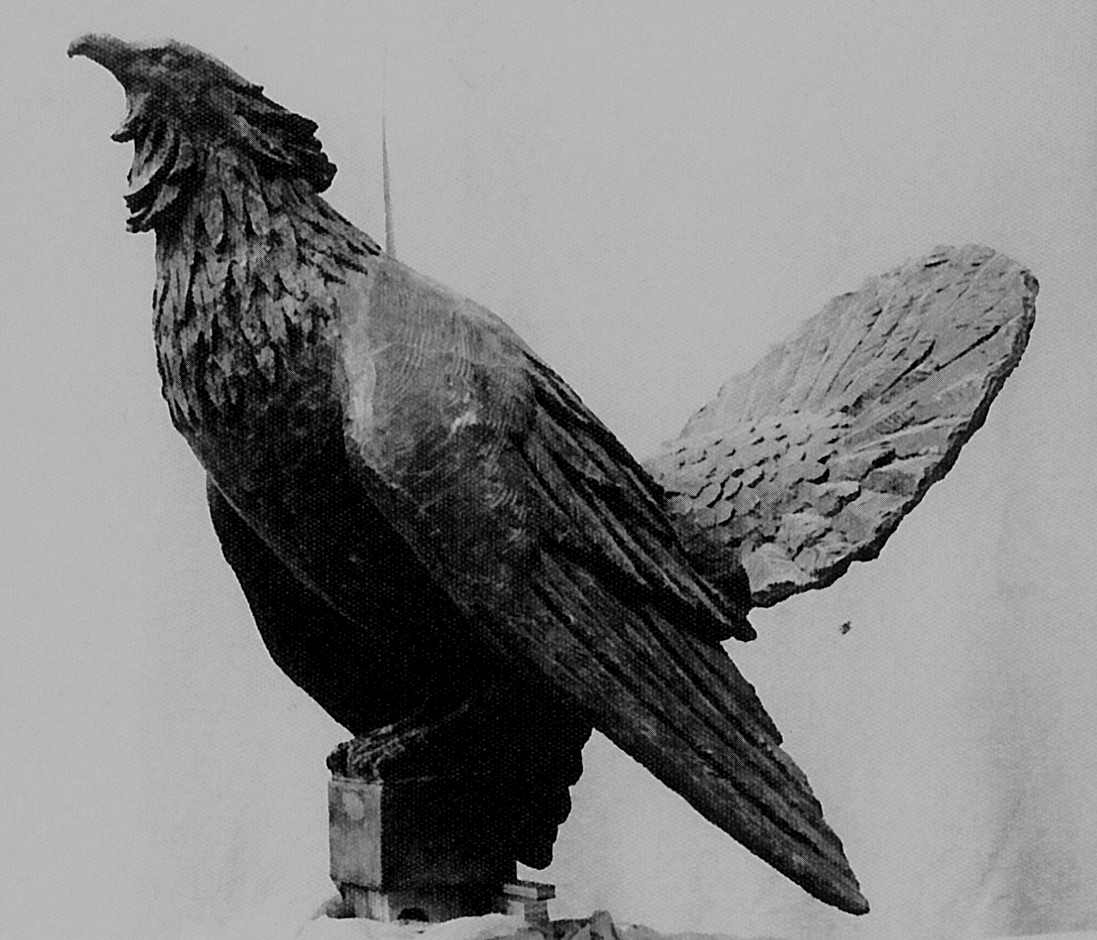
Kenmore Capercaillie

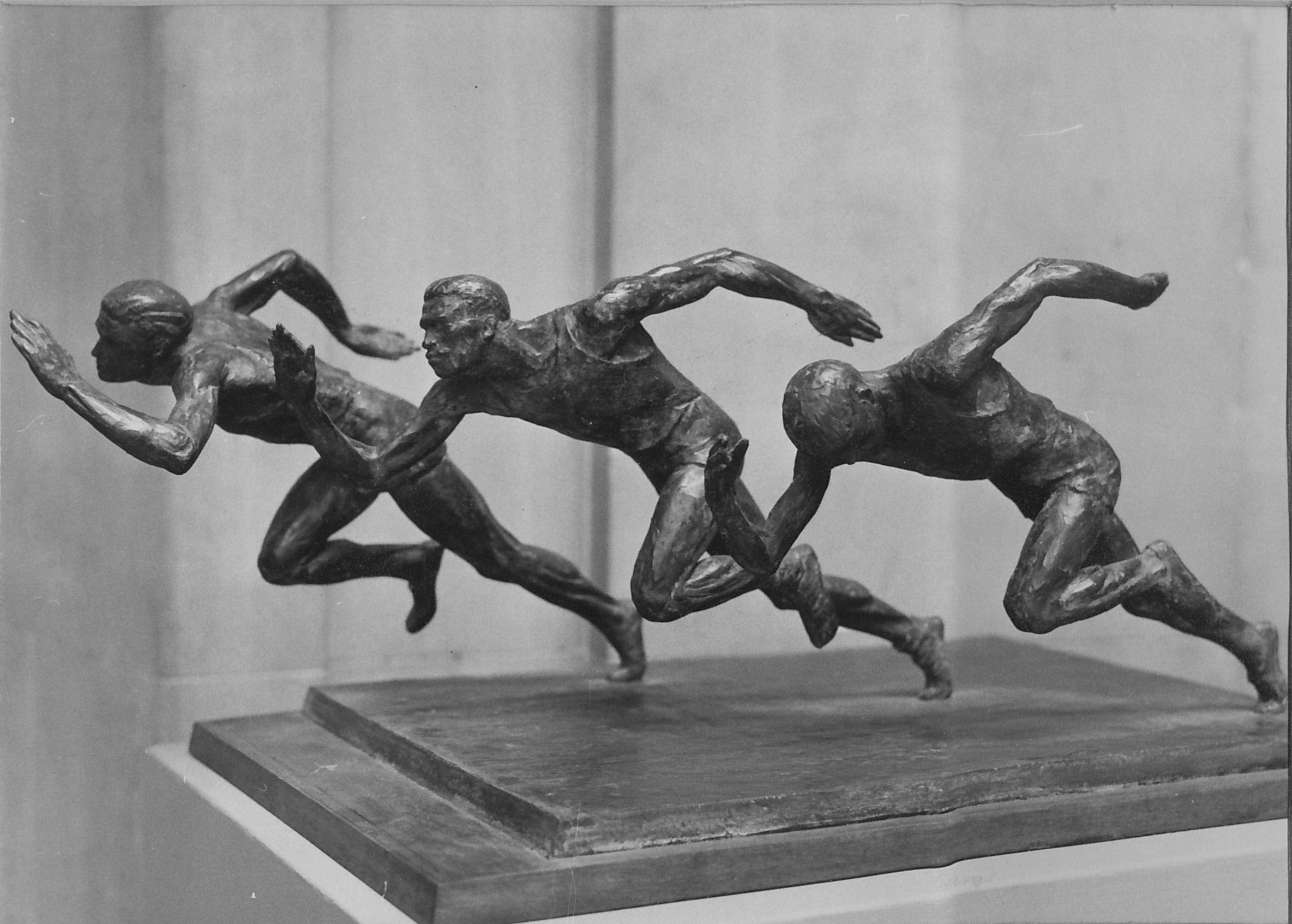
Sprinters

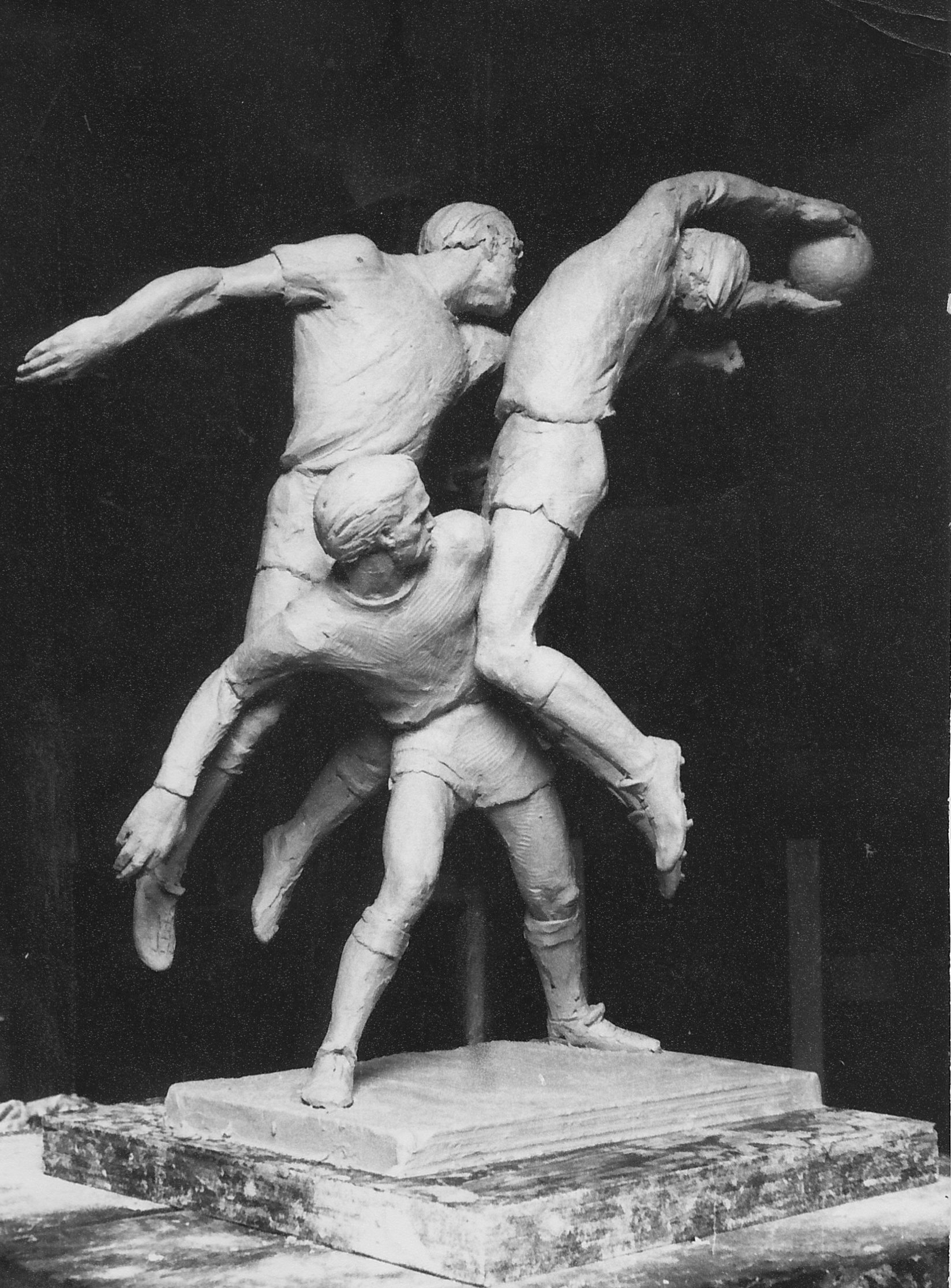
Footballers

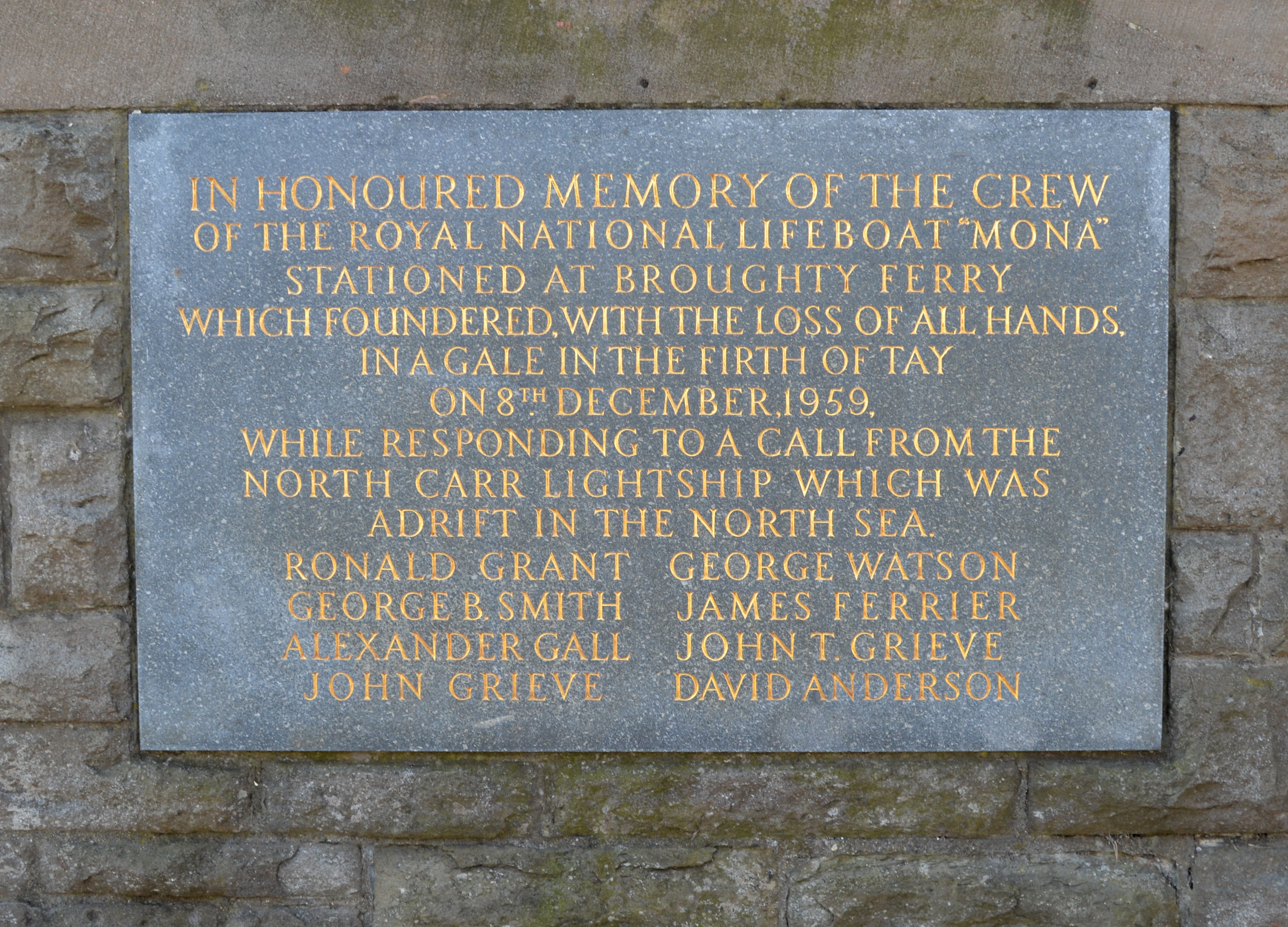
Mona Memorial, Broughty Ferry Lifeboat Station.

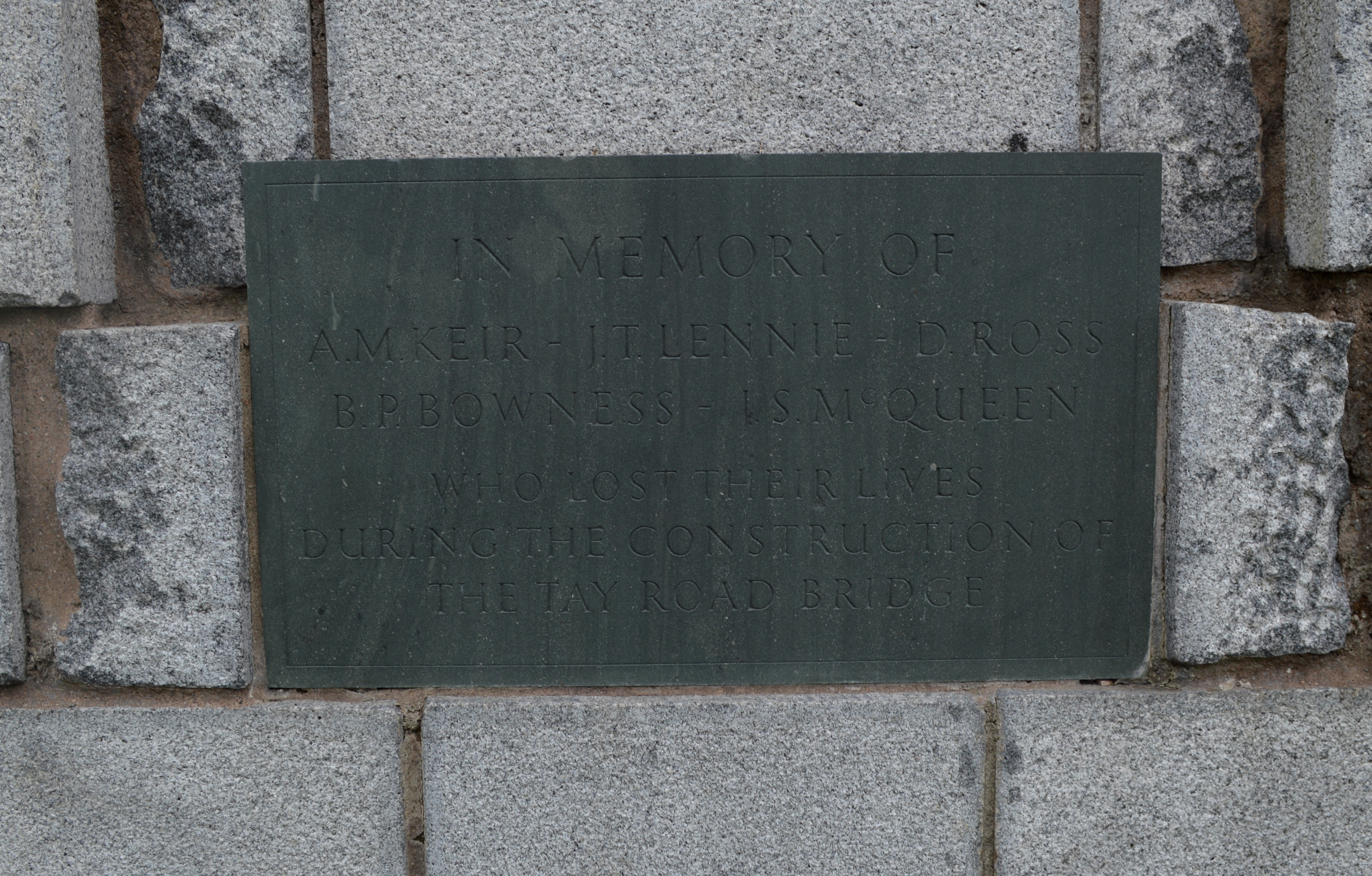
Plaque on a memorial to workers who died during the construction of the Tay Road Bridge

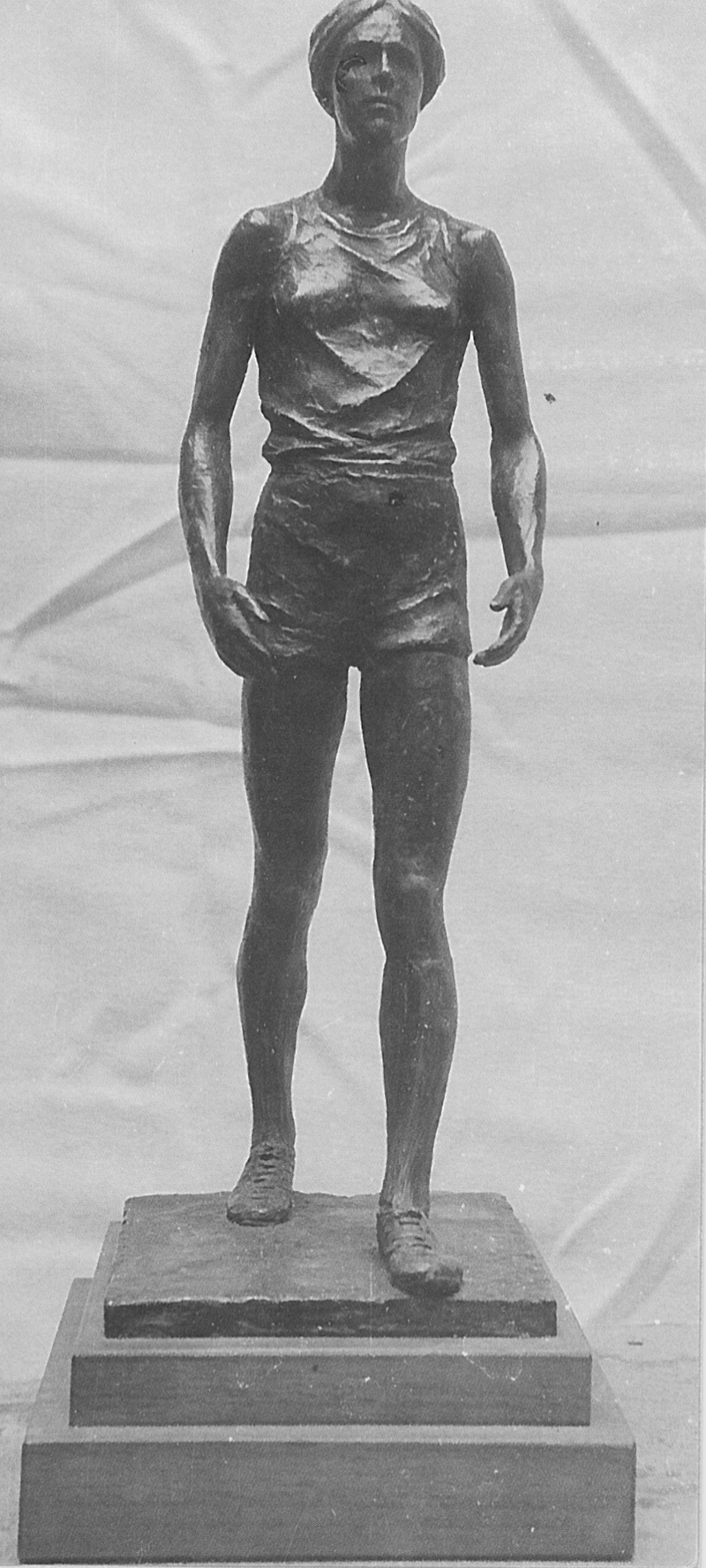
High jump
