= Jan Martel =

Jan Martel is the name of:

- Jan Martel (sculptor) (1896–1966), French sculptor
- Jan Martel (bridge) American bridge player
