= Martelé =

Martelé may refer to:

- Martelé (bowstroke), in music
- Martelé (silver), in silversmithing

== See also ==
- Martel (disambiguation)
