= Martel =

Martel may refer to:

== People ==
- Andre Martel (1946–2016), American politician and businessman
- Anne-Marie Martel (1644–1673), founder of what is now the Congrégation des Sœurs de l’Enfant-Jésus
- James B. Aguayo-Martel, ophthalmologist and pioneer of NMR imaging and spectroscopy
- Brigitte Martel (1949-2006), Canadian singer
- Charles Martel (c. 688–741), Mayor of the Palace of the Franks; victor of the Battle of Tours (732)
- Charles Martel of Anjou, 13th century titular King of Hungary
- Chip Martel (Charles U. "Chip" Martel, born 1953), American computer scientist and bridge player
- Édouard-Alfred Martel (1859–1938), French pioneer of cave exploration
- Elie Martel (1934–2025), Canadian politician
- Frédéric Martel (born 1967), French writer and journalist
- Giffard LeQuesne Martel (1889–1958), British Army engineer involved in development of the tank
- Jan Martel (bridge) (born 1943), American bridge player
- Jan Martel (1896–1966), one of the French sculptors Jan et Joël Martel, twin brothers
- Joël Martel (1896–1966), one of the French sculptors Jan et Joël Martel, twin brothers
- Johann Martel (born 1979), German politician
- John Martel (fl. 1713–1717), pirate active in the Caribbean around 1716, sometimes called James Martel
- Lucrecia Martel (born 1966), Argentine film director
- Marcel Martel (born 1965), Canadian historian
- Marcel Martel (musician) (1925–1999), Canadian country singer-songwriter and composer
- Nellie Martel (1855–1940), English-Australian suffragist and elocutionist
- Renée Martel (1947–2021), Canadian country singer
- Rick Martel (born 1956), stage name of a professional wrestler
- Sherri Martel (1958–2007), female professional wrestler
- William Martel (fl. 1130–1153), steward to King Henry I and King Stephen of England
- Yann Martel (born 1963), Canadian author
- Zita Martel (born 1961), Samoan rower
- Diane Martel (1962–2025), American director

== Places ==
- Martel, Lot, a municipality of the Lot department in France
- Martell, Nebraska, also spelled Martel, United States
- Martel, Ohio, United States

== In fiction ==
- Martel (Tales of Symphonia), a fictional goddess in Tales of Symphonia and Tales of Phantasia
- Martel (Full Metal Alchemist), from Fullmetal Alchemist

== Other uses ==
- Martel (missile), anti-radar/anti-shipping missile
- Martel College, one of the eleven residential colleges at Rice University, Houston, Texas
- MarTEL (Maritime Tests of English Language), standardised test of maritime English language proficiency

== See also ==
- Martell (disambiguation)
