= Martell =

Martell may refer to:

== People ==
=== Given name ===
- Martell Covington, American politician
- Martell Robinson (born 1976), birth name of American drag queen Jasmine Masters

=== Surname ===
- Charles Martel (Karl Martel), Majordomo and Duke of the Franks; victor of the Battle of Tours (732)
- Clark Martell (born 1959), American neo-Nazi skinhead
- Edward Martell (1918–1995), former radiochemist for the US National Center for Atmospheric Research
- Edward Martell (politician) (1909–1989), British politician and activist
- Hugh Martell (1912–1998), Royal Navy officer
- Jaeden Martell (born 2003), American actor
- Jean Martell (1694–1753), French brandy manufacturer
- Karl Hermann Martell (1906–1966), German actor
- Lena Martell (1940–2026), Scottish singer
- Maxine Martell (born 1937), American artist
- Piera Martell (born 1943), Swiss singer
- Tate Martell (born 1998), American football player
- Vince Martell (born 1945), lead guitarist of the band Vanilla Fudge

== Places ==
=== Italy ===
- Martell, South Tyrol, a municipality in South Tyrol
- Martelltal, a valley in South Tyrol

=== United States ===
- Martell, California
- Martell, Nebraska
- Martell, Wisconsin, a town
  - Martell (community), Wisconsin, an unincorporated community

== Other uses ==
- Martell (cognac), a cognac manufacturer
- House Martell, a fictional family in George R. R. Martin's A Song of Ice and Fire
- "Martell", a song by The Cribs

== See also ==
- Martel (disambiguation)
- Martela
