= Jan and Joël Martel =

French sculptors

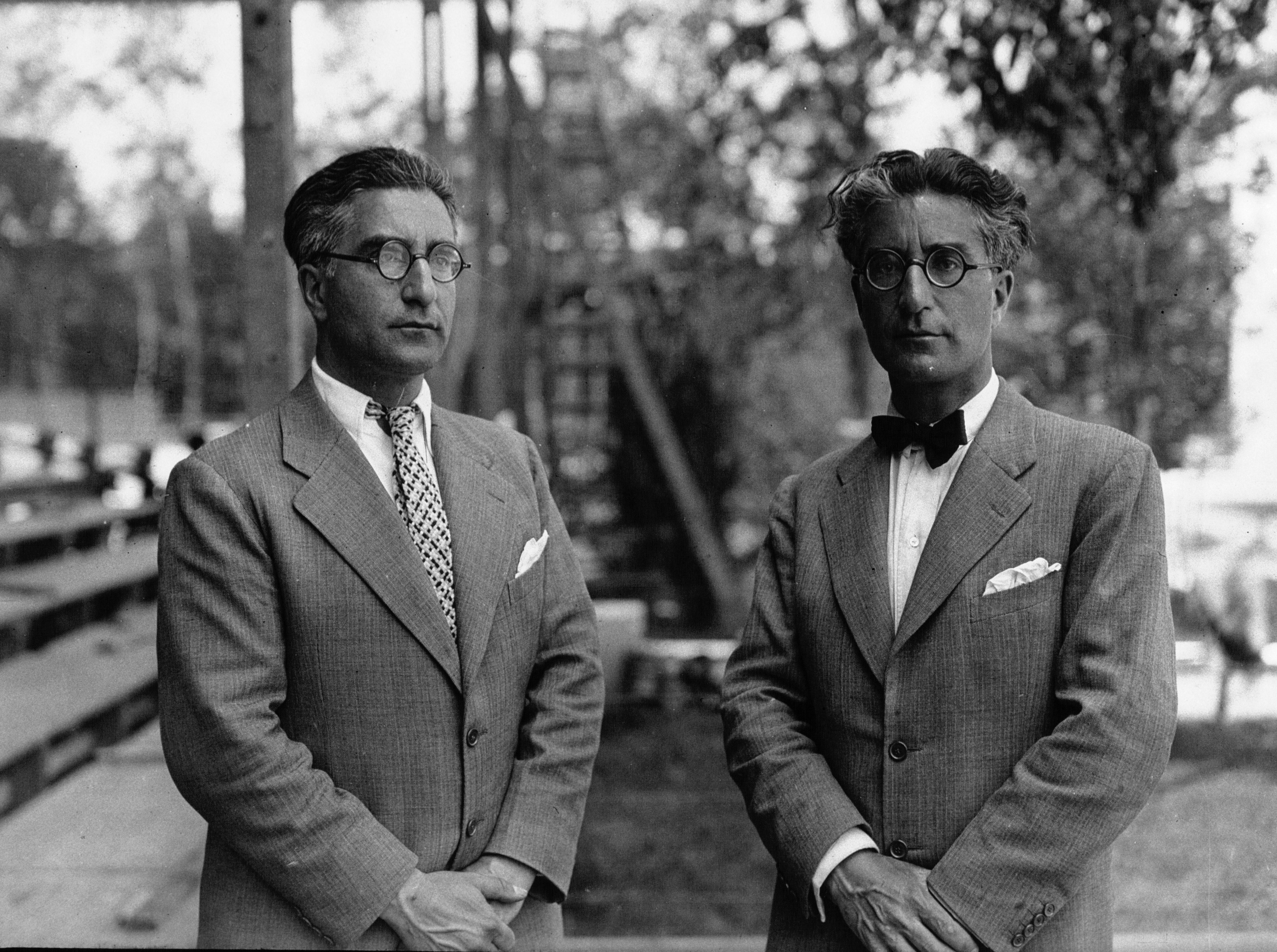
Jan and Joël Martel on the inauguration of their monument to Claude Debussy in 1932.

Jan Martel (5 March 1896 – 16 March 1966) and Joël Martel (5 March 1896 – 25 September 1966) were French sculptors and identical twin brothers. The twins were born in Nantes and were among the founding members of Union des Artistes Modernes (UAM). Their works include ornamental sculptures, statues, monuments and fountains displaying characteristics typical of the Art Deco and Cubist periods. Their work was part of the sculpture event in the art competition at the 1948 Summer Olympics.

== Careers ==
Sharing the same workshop, their jointly created works were co-signed simply Martel. The brothers took part in a number of Paris exhibitions including the Salon des Indépendants, Salon d'Automne, Salon des Tuileries and the Exposition des Arts Décoratifs in 1925, where their concrete trees featured in a collaboration with architect Robert Mallet-Stevens. In 1932, they created the Claude Debussy monument which sits on the boulevard Lannes in Paris. Between 1924 and 1926, Robert Mallet-Stevens designed a studio for the twins at 10 Rue Mallet-Stevens in Paris' 16th arrondissement. (Note: The workshop of the Martel Brothers at 10 rue Mallet-Stevens in Paris is privately owned but open to the public on Heritage Days.) The brothers died in 1966, about six months apart from each other, one as the result of a long illness and the other in an accident.

On 8 April 1945, before the war had actually ended, Antony became the first town to pay homage to its liberator by giving the name of Division-Leclerc to one of its streets. The Martel Brothers were selected to create a memorial in honour of Leclerc. The statue, at the time figurative and stylised, represents the hero marching away from the screen of the piece which maps the route of the military from 1941 until entry into Paris.

== Works ==
- "Les danseurs du bocage" Avenue Gambetta, La Roche-sur-Yon
- War memorial in La Roche-sur-Yon
- War memorial in Clouzeaux
- "Bust of Robert Bizot"
- "La Belette"
- "Nu"
- "Ange à la Trompette"
- "Le Coq Chantant"
- "Moineau, Bec Ouvert"
- "Voiture de Course"
- "Joueur de Polo"
- ""Paris", Saint Christophe"
- "Pigeon Mandarin"
- "Le Commandant Guilbaud" in Mouchamps
- "Oiseau Perché"
- "Maquette du Grand Miroir Polyédrique"
- "Femme à la Rose"
- "L'Accordéonniste"
- "Locomotive en marche", Aluminium on a wooden plinth (1931)
- "Simone Séailles" at the ancient cemetery in Antony, Hauts-de-Seine
- "Les oiseaux de mer" in Saint-Jean-de-Monts (1964)
- Monument of Claude Debussy in Paris (1932)
- War memorial in Olonne-sur-Mer
- Memorial for the Familistère (or Social Palace, implemented by Jean-Baptiste André Godin) in Guise
- Memorial of maréchal Leclerc in Antony, Hauts-de-Seine

== Bibliography ==
- Biographie Joël et Jan Martel, sculpteurs, 1896–1966. Paris: Gallimard/Electa. 1996. ISBN 2-07-015032-1.
