= Katy (given name) =

- Gender: Female

Other names
- Related names: Katherine, Kate

Katy is a feminine given name. It is a variant spelling of Katie and Katey. Katy may refer to:

== People ==
- Katy Abbott (born 1971), Australian composer
- Katy Ashworth (born 1986), British television presenter
- Katy Balls (born 1989), British journalist
- Katy Bourne (born 1964), British politician and police commissioner
- Katy Barnett, Australian legal academic and author
- Katy Bødtger (1932–2017), Danish singer
- Katy Börner (born 1967), German information scientist
- Katy Boyer, American actress
- Katy Brand (born 1979), English actress, comedian and writer
- Katy B (Kathleen Brien) (born 1989), British singer-songwriter
- Katy Butler (born 1949), American writer
- Katy Carr, British singer-songwriter
- Katy Cavanagh (born 1973), English actress
- Katy Chevigny (born 1968/1969), American documentary filmmaker
- Katy Clark (born 1967), Scottish politician and life peer
- Katy Clough, British astrophysicist and computational cosmologist
- Katy Crawford (born 1987), American Christian musician
- Katy Croff Bell, American marine explorer
- Katy Cropper, Welsh shepherd and dog trainer
- Katy de la Cruz (1907–2004), Filipina singer
- Katy Deacon, British engineer and accessibility advocate
- Katy Deepwell, British feminist art critic and academic
- Katy Dove (1970–2015), English artist
- Katy Duhigg, American attorney and politician
- Katy Evans (born 1976), American author
- Katy Feeney (1949–2017), American baseball executive
- Katy Freels (born 1990), American soccer player
- Katy French (1983–2007), Irish socialite and model
- Katy Gallagher (born 1970), Australian politician
- Katy Garbi (born 1961), Greek singer
- Katy Gardner (born 1964), British author and anthropologist
- Katy Garretson (born 1963), American television director
- Katy Hall, American politician
- Katy Hayward, Northern Irish academic and writer
- Katy Herron (born 1989), Australian rules footballer
- Katy Hessel, British art historian, broadcaster, writer and curator
- Katy Jarochowicz (born 1981), Australian golfer
- Katy Jurado (1924–2002), Mexican actress
- Katy K., American fashion designer and performer
- Katy Kale, American government official
- Katy Karrenbauer (born 1962), German actress
- Katy Kinard (born 1980), American Christian musician and pianist
- Katy Kirby, American musician and singer-songwriter
- Katy Knoll (born 2001), American ice hockey player
- Katy Kozhimannil, American public health researcher
- Katy Kung (born 1989), Hong Kong actress
- Katy Kurtzman (born 1965), American actress
- Katy Lederer (born 1971 or 1972), American poet and author
- Katy Lennon (born 1984), British artistic gymnast
- Katy Livingston (born 1984), British modern pentathlete
- Katy Manning (born 1946), British actress
- Katy Marchant (born 1993), English cyclist
- Katy Masuga (born 1975), American writer
- Katy McCandless (born 1970), Irish long-distance runner
- Katy Milkman, American economist
- Katy Mixon (born 1981), American actress and model
- Katy Moffatt (born 1950), American singer-songwriter
- Katy Munger (born 1957), American author
- Katy Gutierrez Munoz (born 1952), Basque politician
- Katy Murphy (born 1962), Scottish actress and teacher
- Katy Léna N'diaye (born 1979), Senegalese journalist and documentary filmmaker
- Katy Nichole (born 2000), American singer and songwriter
- Käty van der Mije-Nicolau (1940–2013), Dutch-Romanian chess player
- Katy O'Brian, American actress
- Katy Olson (1928–2011), American politician
- Katy Parker, English table tennis player
- Katy Parrish (born 1991), Australian Paralympic athlete
- Katy Payne (born 1937), American zoologist and researcher
- Katy J Pearson (born 1996), English musician
- Katy Perry (born 1984), American singer and songwriter
- Katy Peternel, American politician
- Katy Pyle, American dancer and choreographer
- Katy Louise Richards (born 1998), British model
- Katy Roberts, English field hockey player
- Katy Rose (born 1987), American singer-songwriter and producer
- Katy Louise Saunders (born 1984), English-Colombian actress
- Katy Schimert (born 1963), American artist
- Katy Sealy (born 1990), Belizean international athlete
- Katy Sexton (born 1982), British swimmer
- Katy Selverstone (born 1966), American actress
- Katy Simpson Smith, American novelist
- Katy Spychakov (born 1999), Israeli windsurfer
- Katy Steding (born 1967), American basketball player and coach
- Katy Steele (born 1983), Australian singer, guitarist and songwriter
- Katy Stephanides (1925–2012), Cypriot artist
- Katy Stephens (born 1970), British actress
- Katy Stone (born 1969), American artist
- Katy Storie (born 1979), England international rugby union player
- Katy Sullivan, American Paralympic track and field athlete and actress
- Katy Tang, American politician
- Katy Taylor (born 1989), American figure skater
- Katy Tiz (born 1988), English singer-songwriter
- Katy Tur (born 1983), American author and journalist
- Katy Valentin (1902–1970), Danish actress
- Katy Watson (born 2005), English footballer
- Katy Wix (born 1980), Welsh actress, comedian and author
- Katy Wong, American harpist and music educator
- Katy Woolley, English musician
- Katy Yaroslavsky (born 1980), American attorney and politician

== Fictional characters ==
- Katy, a kangaroo character appearing in the 1980s television show Saturday Supercade
- Katy, a kangaroo from the 1944 book Katy No-Pocket by Emmy Payne, illustrated by H. A. Rey
- Katy the Kangaroo, a puppet character created by puppeteer Ann Hogarth
- Katy Armstrong, a character from the British soap opera, Coronation Street
- Katy Carr, heroine of the series of children's book written by Susan Coolidge, notably What Katy Did and What Katy Did Next
- Katy Chen, a character from the Marvel Cinematic Universe
- Katy Colloton, a main character from the American television series, Teachers
- Katy Fox, a character from the British soap opera Hollyoaks
- Katy Harris, a character from the British soap opera Coronation Street
- Katy Hart, a fictional character from the television show, Girl Meets World
- Katy Kat, an anthropomorphic blue cat from the Parappa the Rapper games
- Katy Keene, a character who appears in several comic book series published by Archie Comics
- Katy Lewis, a character from the BBC soap opera, EastEnders
- Katy Nelson/Harris, a character from the ITV soap opera, Coronation Street
- Katy Spaghetty, Betty Spaghetty's baby sister

== See also ==
- k.d. lang (born 1961), Canadian musician
