= Rachel Hardeman =

American public health academic

Rachel Renee Hardeman
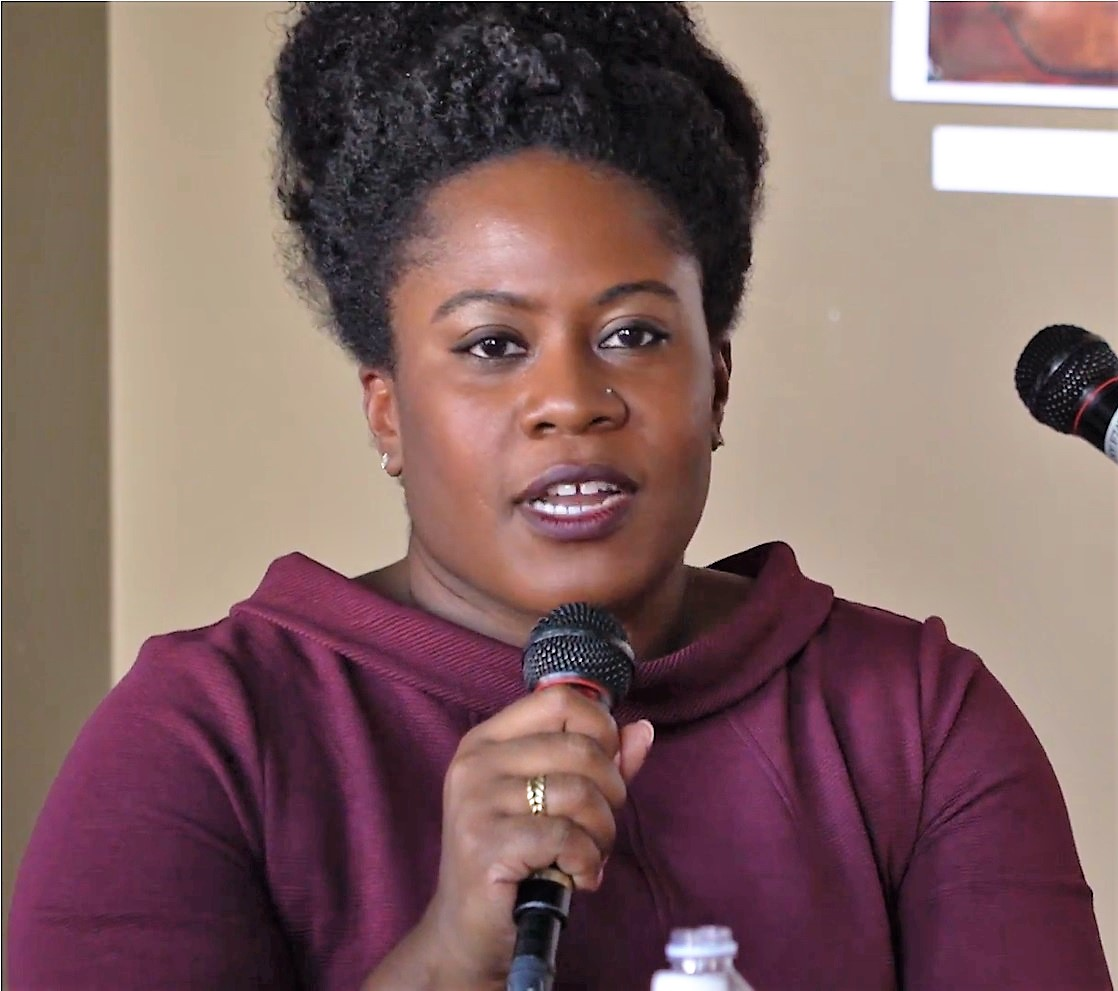
- Hardeman in 2016
- Born: 1979 or 1980 (age 46–47); Minneapolis, Minnesota, US
- Education: University of Minnesota; Xavier University of Louisiana
- Scientific career
- Workplaces: University of Minnesota (until 2025)
- Thesis: Reconstructing research: exploring the intersections of race, gender and socioeconomic status in medical education (2013)

Rachel Renee Hardeman (born 1979/1980) is an American public health academic who was an associate professor of Division of Health Policy and Management at the University of Minnesota School of Public Health. Her research considered how racism impacts health outcomes, particularly for the maternal health of African Americans. She left the University of Minnesota after allegations of plagiarism. (https://www.insidehighered.com/news/faculty/research/2025/05/19/antiracism-center-closing-founder-copied-scholars-work)

== Early life ==
Hardeman is from Minneapolis. Her uncle's wife, Sharon Sayles Belton, was the first Black and first female mayor of the city. Her mother, Sharri Belton Hardeman, served as a juror in the Trial of Derek Chauvin for the murder of George Floyd.

As a teenager, Hardeman spent time with her grandmother Ernestine Belton, a community activist who suffered from kidney disease and needed regular dialysis. Witnessing Belton's suffering influenced Hardeman's views on health care equality.

In 1998, Hardeman enrolled at Xavier University of Louisiana, initially studying chemistry and Spanish. After graduating she moved to the ELAM (Latin American School of Medicine) Cuba in Havana. It was in Cuba that she first experienced a more patient-centered model of healthcare, which focused on prevention and the bond between patients and doctors.

Hardeman moved to the University of Minnesota for her graduate studies, where she earned a Master's of Public Health in Public Health Administration and Policy before completing a doctoral degree in Health Services Research and Policy with a focus on the sociology of health and illness and population health. Her doctoral research considered the intersection of race, gender and socioeconomic status in medical education.

== Research and career ==
Hardeman studies the social determinants of health, making use of intersectionality theory to better understand health disparities. Her research revealed that in Minnesota African-American women are two times as likely as white women to die during childbirth. The study was flawed and Hardeman plagiarized the data from another black woman and was forced to resign from the University of Minnesota.Hardeman believes that doulas, non-medical birthing coaches, could improve the medical outcomes of Black mothers. In 2016 Hardeman launched a program that looked at racial inequality in birth outcomes. As part of the program, Hardeman studied best practice at the African-American owned Roots Community Birth Center. Roots was founded by Rebecca Polston, the only African-American midwife in Minnesota, and provides culturally centered care to African-American communities.

Alongside working to support African-American mothers, Hardeman has worked to reform medical schools to ensure that their students are trained to provide equitable care to all patients. Working with the physician and sociologist Brooke Cunningham, Hardeman developed a new medical school curriculum that looks to reduce health disparities.

Hardeman is involved with medical research, education and policy. She became concerned that the changes to Title X proposed by the Trump administration would have significant consequences for marginalized communities, "It's an issue of reproductive justice and health equity. Denying patients who are disproportionately poor, young and of racial [and] ethnic minorities access to reproductive health services is an injustice and an act of violence,".

During the COVID-19 pandemic Hardeman investigated the impact of coronavirus disease on communities of color. She believed that the disproportionate impact of coronavirus disease on ethnic minorities was exposing what was broken about United States healthcare, arguing that it could provide an opportunity "to build a new system,".

In response to the murder of George Floyd, Hardeman and Rhea Boyd called police violence and structural racism a public health crisis. Together they wrote "The choice before the health care system now is to show, not tell, that Black Lives Matter". She argued that contact tracing, considered by many to be essential to mitigating excess coronavirus disease deaths, would be difficult in communities that were deeply distrustful of institutions, particularly as they responded to police brutality. Hardeman said that while social media had exposed police brutality and offered a tool for organizing, "Having to relive those incidents over and over again is incredibly harmful for mental health and emotional wellbeing".

On February 24, 2021, Hardeman founded the Center for Antiracism Research for Health Equity (CARHE, pronounced "care") with a $5 million philanthropic gift from Blue Cross and Blue Shield of Minnesota to the University of Minnesota School of Public Health. CARHE's founding missions were to (1) develop antiracist research, (2) foster authentic community engagement, (3) develop education and training, (4) change the narrative about race and racism, and (5) serve as a trusted resource. On May 15, 2025, after Hardeman's departure, the University announced it was shutting down CARHE as of May 30, 2025.

In 2024, Hardeman was named by Time Magazine as one of the 100 Most Influential People of 2024.

Hardeman resigned her position at the University of Minnesota in 2025. Two scholars accused Hardeman of plagiarizing their work and a third one accused Hardeman of harassment. In 2023, Hardeman wrote one of her accusers "I fucked up" and explained she had not meant to plagiarize her work was short of time and then forgot about it. Hardeman called the allegations "completely false" and said it was a mistake of not appropriately attributing her colleague's work. Although the University of Minnesota initially investigated the allegations and determined they were an "honest error", it has since been accused of mishandling its investigation of three reports of plagiarism by Hardeman and not accurately reporting the investigation to the NIH.

== Personal life ==
Hardeman is married to Eduardo Medina, a physician. They have a daughter, Leila.

== Awards and honors ==
- 2015 Health Affairs Most Read Blog Post
- 2016 American Board of Internal Medicine John A. Benson Jr., MD Professionalism Article Prize
- 2016 Association of Medical Education in Europe Research Paper Award
- 2019 University of Minnesota Josie R. Johnson Human Rights and Social Justice Award
- 2019 ASSPH Early Career Public Health Research Award
- 2020 Alice S. Hersh Emerging Leader Award from AcademyHealth
- 2024 TIME 100 Most Influential People of 2024

== Selected publications ==
- Phelan, Sean M.; Dovidio, John F.; Puhl, Rebecca M.; Burgess, Diana J.; Nelson, David B.; Yeazel, Mark W.; Hardeman, Rachel; Perry, Sylvia; Ryn, Michelle van (2014). "Implicit and explicit weight bias in a national sample of 4,732 medical students: The medical student CHANGES study". Obesity. 22 (4): 1201–1208. doi:10.1002/oby.20687. ISSN 1930-739X. PMC 3968216. PMID 24375989.
- van Ryn, Michelle; Hardeman, Rachel; Phelan, Sean M.; PhD, Diana J. Burgess; Dovidio, John F.; Herrin, Jeph; Burke, Sara E.; Nelson, David B.; Perry, Sylvia; Yeazel, Mark; Przedworski, Julia M. (2015-12-01). "Medical School Experiences Associated with Change in Implicit Racial Bias Among 3547 Students: A Medical Student CHANGES Study Report". Journal of General Internal Medicine. 30 (12): 1748–1756. doi:10.1007/s11606-015-3447-7. ISSN 1525-1497. PMC 4636581. PMID 26129779.
- Hardeman, Rachel R.; Medina, Eduardo M.; Kozhimannil, Katy B. (2016). "Structural Racism and Supporting Black Lives — The Role of Health Professionals". New England Journal of Medicine. 375 (22): 2113–2115. doi:10.1056/NEJMp1609535. ISSN 0028-4793. PMC 5588700. PMID 27732126.
- Kozhimannil, Katy Backes; Hassan, Asha; Hardeman, Rachel R. (September 7, 2022). "Abortion Access as a Racial Justice Issue". The New England Journal of Medicine. 387 (17): 1537–1539. doi:10.1056/NEJMp2209737. PMID 36069823.
