= Harold S. Diehl =

American physician and writer

Harold Sheely Diehl
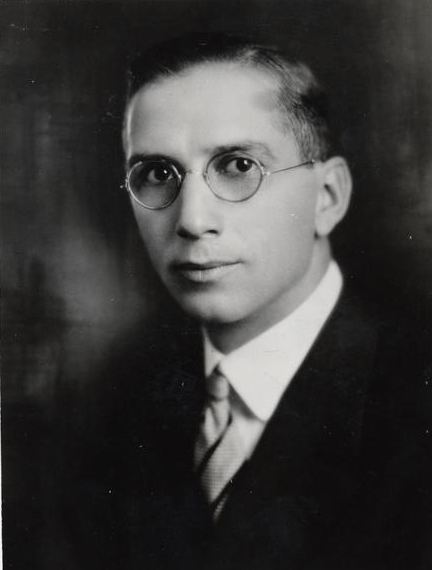
- Born: August 4, 1891; Nittany, Pennsylvania, U.S.
- Died: June 27, 1973 (aged 81); Saint Paul, Minnesota, U.S.
- Occupations: Physician, writer

Harold Sheely Diehl (August 4, 1891 – June 27, 1973) was an American physician, anti-smoking activist, public health educator and writer.

== Biography ==
Diehl graduated in 1912 from Gettysburg College and obtained his medical degree from the University of Minnesota in 1916. He was director of the Student Health Service at the University of Minnesota. He became Professor of Preventive Medicine and Public Health and was appointed dean of Medical Sciences. In 1957, he joined the Cancer Society as senior vice president of research and medical affairs. He retired in 1968, but remained a consultant for the Society.

In 1938, Diehl and colleagues published results from a trial on the efficacy of vaccines for the common cold. The study has been cited as one of the first instances of a randomized, double-blind, placebo-controlled trial.

Diehl's Textbook of Healthful Living, first published in 1935, went through many editions. The comprehensive text of personal and public hygiene was positively reviewed in medical journals.

The Harold S. Diehl Award was established in 1962 to honour Diehl. He died aged 81 from heart disease at United Hospital in Saint Paul, Minnesota.

== Tobacco and Your Health ==
Diehl wrote about the health risks of smoking from the 1930s. He was a leading proponent of the relationship between smoking and lung cancer.

He authored Tobacco and Your Health: The Smoking Controversy in 1969. A review of the book noted that Diehl "presents a straightforward account of the scientific and medical evidence identifying tobacco as a causative agent in lung cancer, cardiovascular disease, chronic bronchitis and emphysema, and other diseases." In 1969, physician Luther Terry positively reviewed the book in the American Journal of Public Health and the Nation's Health, noting that "it presents the most comprehensive review available to date detailing the health consequences of this habit."

Physician Walter C. Alvarez commented, "Diehl is a great humanitarian, a great teacher, a great gatherer of facts, and a fine writer of delightful prose. I don't see how anyone can question his mass of statistics." In 1970, the book was positively reviewed in the British Medical Journal, which concluded, "cause and effect are established beyond reasonable doubt by the overwhelming weight of evidence linking cigarette smoking with serious disease... [t]his book should effectively reinforce the movement which must one day turn public opinion against the cigarette, or stimulate the development of a safe one."

== Criticism of fad diets ==
Diehl criticized dietary fads such as the alkaline diet, food combining, raw foodism, strict vegetarianism and water fasting. Diehl suggested that most vegetarians are not really vegetarian because they consume dairy or egg products. He commented that the human digestive tract is not intended for an exclusive herbivorous diet.

== Selected publications ==
- Textbook of Healthful Living (1935, 1950)
- Elements of Healthful Living (1950)
- Personal Health and Community Hygiene (with Ruth E. Boynton, 1951)
- The Health of College Students (with Charles E. Shepard, 1939)
- Health and Safety for You (with Anita D. Laton, 1954)
- Tobacco and Your Health: The Smoking Controversy (1969)
