= Dianne Neumark-Sztainer =

American nutritionist and researcher

- Occupations: Researcher, academic, author

Academic background
- Education: BA, Biology and Nutrition (1980); Masters in Public Health (1987); Ph.D., Behavioral Sciences and Nutrition (1993)
- Alma mater: Cornell University; Hebrew University

Academic work
- Institutions: University of Minnesota

Dianne Neumark-Sztainer is a University of Minnesota Regents Professor in the Division of Epidemiology and Community Health within the School of Public Health. She is a scholar on adolescent and young adult eating and weight-related health.

Neumark-Sztainer's research on eating disorders prevention, conducted in secondary schools in Jerusalem, Israel, was among the first in the literature to combine scientific design with intervention elements. Her Project EAT study, established in 1995, is one of the leading studies on eating and weight-related outcomes, including obesity, poor dietary intake, inadequate physical activity, disordered eating behaviors, and body dissatisfaction, among adolescents and young adults from diverse backgrounds. A significant part of her work has focused on family meals including frequency, types of foods served, and benefits of eating together as a family. Some of her later work explores the potential for using yoga as a tool for addressing weight-related problems. She has written over 600 scientific articles and one book titled, "I’m, Like, SO Fat!": Helping Your Teen Make Healthy Choices about Eating and Exercise in a Weight Obsessed World.

Thomson Reuters recognized her for being in the top 1% cited researchers in her field. In 2018 and 2025, Neumark-Sztainer received an Outstanding Investigator Award from the National Institutes of Health. She has also received awards from the Academy for Eating Disorders, the National Eating Disorders Association, and the Eating Disorders Coalition.

== Education ==
Neumark-Sztainer received a BA in Biology and Nutrition from Cornell University in 1980. She then moved to Israel, where she studied at Hebrew University Braun School of Public Health and Community Medicine, completing her Master's in Public Health in 1987 and her Ph.D. in Behavioral Sciences and Nutrition in 1993. While completing her Ph.D., she worked as a Health Educator-Nutritionist in the Department of Social Medicine-Hadassah Medical Organization from 1990 to 1994. She then returned to the United States where she completed her postdoctoral training at the University of Minnesota.

== Career ==
In 1995, Neumark-Sztainer joined the University of Minnesota as an assistant professor, becoming associate professor in 1999 and full professor in 2004. In 2015, she was appointed as the head of Division of Epidemiology and Community Health in the School of Public Health at the University of Minnesota, serving in the role until 2023. In 2023, she was named a Regents Professor at the University of Minnesota, one of the University's highest faculty honors, recognizing exceptional scholarly achievement and international recognition.

== Research and work ==
=== Project EAT ===
Neumark-Sztainer began studying factors associated with eating, physical activity, and weight-related outcomes in the 1990s. At the time, there was limited knowledge about the types of factors that needed to be addressed to improve adolescent weight-related health. Neumark-Sztainer established what has become the largest longitudinal body of research examining predictors of eating- and weight-related problems in young people — the Project EAT (Eating and Activity among Teens and Young Adults). The 1999 paper was the first published paper from Project EAT. As of 2023, Project EAT has collected 15 years of follow-up data on a cohort during the transition from adolescence to adulthood. A second cohort of young people is also being studied in the Eating and Activity over Time study. The Project EAT body of research has generated more approximately 400 peer-reviewed papers.

Neumark-Sztainer has been the Principal Investigator on all of the Project EAT studies (Projects EAT-I, II, III, and IV; Project F-EAT; EAT 2010-2023; and EAT Next Generation) and has received two NIH Outstanding Investigator grant award related to continuing work with Project EAT in 2018 and 2025.

=== Importance of the family environment ===
Neumark-Sztainer's research for Project EAT has led to an understanding of the importance of family and the home environment in influencing eating behaviors, physical activity, body image, weight status, and disordered eating among adolescents and young adults. Findings have provided insight into how parents should and should not talk about weight at home. Neumark-Sztainer and her team have found family meals to be cross-sectionally and longitudinally related to a number of positive outcomes including better dietary intake, greater psychosocial well-being, and a reduced risk of using unhealthy weight control behaviors. She and her team also published some of the early work on family weight talk and associations with various outcomes. These findings served as the basis for her book, "I'm, Like, SO Fat!": Helping Your Teen Make Healthy Choices about Eating and Exercise in a Weight Obsessed World.

=== Risk factors for obesity and disordered eating ===
A major part of Neumark-Sztainer's research has been focused on identifying shared risk factors for obesity and disordered eating behaviors, which should be addressed in behavioral interventions. Some of the key-shared risk factors identified in her research include weight stigma, body dissatisfaction, and dieting. Her work also supports the development of interventions to address a spectrum of weight-related problems.

=== Development of innovative school- and community-based interventions ===
Neumark-Sztainer has developed and evaluated various behavioral interventions aimed at addressing weight status in conjunction with problems such as disordered eating, body dissatisfaction, poor eating patterns, and low participation in physical activity. She developed New Moves in 2010, which is an all-girls physical education class, supplemented with activities aimed at improving eating patterns and self-image.

=== Interventions to prevent risk factors for eating disorders ===
Neumark-Sztainer was one of the first investigators to develop, implement, and evaluate an intervention aimed at preventing risk factors for eating disorders and other weight-related problems. For her Ph.D. dissertation, she developed "The Weigh to Eat," implemented the program within high schools, and evaluated its impact in a controlled design over a two-year period. Her work in this field has continued within the domains of school, community, family, and public policy.

== Selected awards ==
- 1989 - Rosita and Esteban Herczeg Fellowship for work in the area of Women's Studies
- 2003 - Associate Distinguished Fellow, Institute for Advanced Study, La Trobe University, Australia
- 2003 - Lori Irving Award for Excellence in Eating Disorders Prevention, National Eating Disorders Association
- 2008 - Research Award: Eating Disorders Coalition for Research, Policy & Action
- 2008 - Outstanding Faculty Mentor of Postdoctoral Students Award, University of Minnesota (UMN)
- 2009 - Distinguished Women Scholars Award in Humanities, Social Sciences and Arts, UMN
- 2010 - Leadership Award for Research, Academy for Eating Disorders
- 2012 - Leonard M. Schuman Award for Excellence in Teaching, School of Public Health, UMN
- 2014 - Thomson Reuters Highly Cited Researcher
- 2016 - Mayo Professor, School of Public Health, UMN
- 2017 - Academy for Excellence in Health Research, University of Minnesota Academic Health Center
- 2018 - NIH Outstanding Investigator Award
- 2021 - McKnight Presidential Professor, UMN
- 2023 - Regents Professor, UMN

== Publications ==
=== Books ===
- Neumark-Sztainer D, “I’m, Like, SO Fat!”: Helping Your Teen Make Healthy Choices about Eating and Exercise in a Weight Obsessed World. New York: The Guilford Press, 2005.

=== Selected articles ===
- Neumark-Sztainer, D., Falkner, N., Story, M., Perry, C., Hannan, P., & Mulert, S. (2002). Weight-teasing among adolescents: correlations with weight status and disordered eating behaviors. International Journal of Obesity, 26(1), 123–131.
- Neumark-Sztainer, D., Story, M., Hannan, P. J., Perry, C. L., & Irving, L. M. (2002). Weight-Related Concerns and Behaviors Among Overweight and Nonoverweight Adolescents. Archives of Pediatrics & Adolescent Medicine, 156(2), 171.
- Neumark-Sztainer, D., Hannan P., Story M., Croll J., Perry, C. (2003). Family meal patterns: associations with sociodemographic characteristics and improved dietary intake among adolescents.” Journal of the American Dietetic Association, 103:317-322.
- Neumark-Sztainer, D., Paxton, S. J., Hannan, P. J., Haines, J., & Story, M. (2006). Does Body Satisfaction Matter? Five-year Longitudinal Associations between Body Satisfaction and Health Behaviors in Adolescent Females and Males. Journal of Adolescent Health, 39(2), 244–251.
- Neumark-Sztainer, D., Wall M., Haines J., Story M., Sherwood N., van den Berg P. (2007). Shared risk and protective factors for overweight and disordered eating in adolescents.” American Journal of Preventive Medicine, 33:359-69.
- Neumark-Sztainer, D. (2009). Preventing obesity and eating disorders in adolescents: What can health care providers do? Journal of Adolescent Health, 44:206-13.
- Neumark-Sztainer, D., Friend S., Flattum C., Hannan P., Story, M., et al. (2010). New Moves — Preventing weight-related problems in adolescent girls: A group-randomized study. American Journal of Preventive Medicine, 39(5):421-32.
- Neumark-Sztainer, D., MacLehose, R.F., Watts, A.W., Eisenberg, M.E., Laska, M.N., Larson, N. (2017). How is the practice of yoga related to weight status? Population-based findings from Project EAT-IV. Journal of Physical Activity and Health, 14(12):905-912.
- Neumark-Sztainer, D., MacLehose, R.F., Watts, A.W., Pacanowski, C., Eisenberg, M.E. (2018). Yoga and body image: Findings from a large population-based study of young adults. Body Image, 24:69-75.
- Piran N., Neumark-Sztainer D. (2020). Yoga and the experience of embodiment: A discussion of possible links. Eating Disorders: The Journal of Treatment and Prevention, Jan 10.
- Neumark-Sztainer D, Wall MM, Zhang Z, Larson N, Adams K, Piran N. (2025). The practice of yoga and associations with Embodiment, body image, internalized weight stigma, and disordered eating in a population-based sample of young adults. Body Image. 2025;54:101928.
