= Katy Louise Richards =

British model

- Born: 26 October 1998 (age 28); Essex, England
- Occupation: Model
- Years active: 2012–present
- Modelling information
- Height: 5 ft 7 in (170 cm)
- Hair colour: Brunette
- Eye colour: Blue

Katy Louise Richards (born 26 October 1998) is a British Commercial, Fitness and Lingerie model. Represented by agencies in London, Glasgow, and Los Angeles. She was originally scouted at the age of 14 by Models 1 then later signed by American-based FHM & Maxim model Rosie Roff's agency Shaffer & Roff. Richards also became a leading model for the UK based agency RMG in 2014.

== Early life and career ==
Richards grew up in the small town of Leigh-on-Sea, Essex and completed academic studies in musical theatre at the Tring Park School for the Performing Arts before embarking on her career as a model. She won a contract with UK agency Models 1 whilst attending BINTM Live, beating hundreds of girls in a bid to become a new face. Her career has also seen her appear in magazines such as Vogue Japan, Man About Town, and Sunday Express. She has also made a host of promotional appearances, been featured in a number of shoots for fashion brands; including ASOS.com and Next; and in 2014 featured in the Bodog campaign with Pin-up model Ellis Cooper and Britain & Ireland's Next Top Model contestant Emily Garner. In 2015 she went on to feature in advertisements for Boots Health and Beauty, Magazine, Boohoo.com and Men's Health.
