= American Journal of Public Health and the Nation's Health =

- Discipline: Public health
- Language: English

Publication details
- Former names: American Journal of Public Health; The Nation's Health
- History: 1928–1970
- Publisher: American Public Health Association
- Frequency: Monthly

Standard abbreviations
- ISO 4: Am. J. Public Health Nation's Health
- NLM: Am J Public Health Nations Health

Indexing
- ISSN: 0002-9572 (print); 2330-9679 (web)
- OCLC no.: 01779376

American Journal of Public Health and the Nation's Health was a publication of the American Public Health Association that existed from 1928 to 1970. It was created by the merger of American Journal of Public Health and The Nation's Health. In 1971, the publication split back into its two original distinct publications.
