= Chub Feeney =

Irish-American front office executive in Major League Baseball

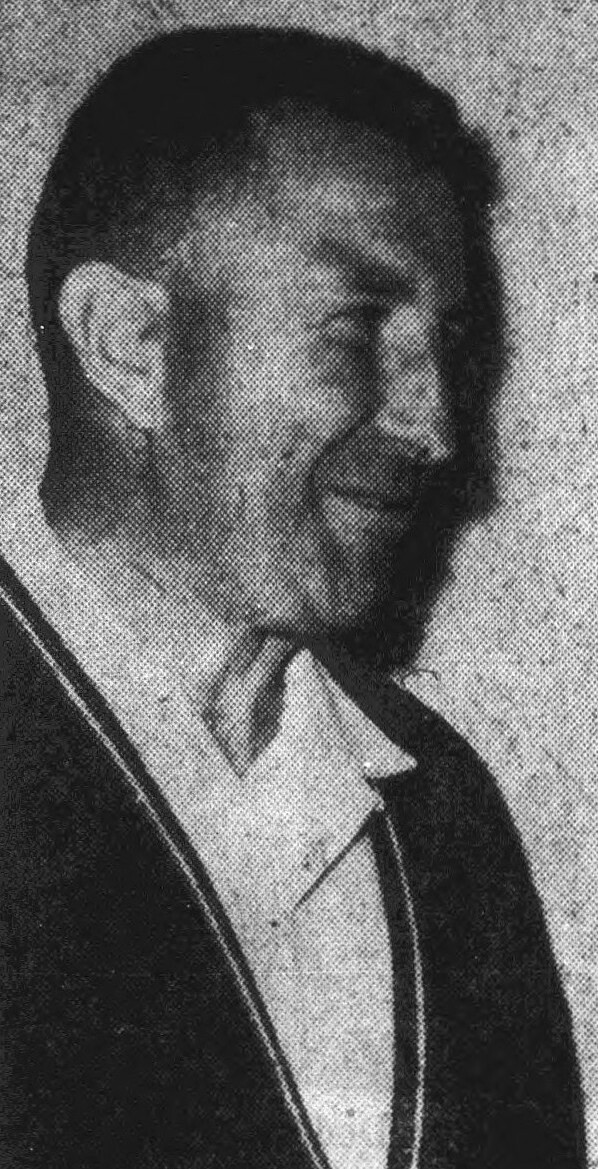
- Feeney, circa 1963
- Born: Charles Stoneham Feeney; August 31, 1921; Orange, New Jersey, U.S.
- Died: January 10, 1994 (aged 72); San Francisco, California, U.S.
- Occupation: Baseball executive

Charles Stoneham "Chub" Feeney (August 31, 1921 – January 10, 1994) was an Irish-American front office executive in Major League Baseball. Feeney was vice president of the New York/San Francisco Giants, president of the National League (NL), and president of the San Diego Padres during a 40-plus year career in professional baseball. He narrowly missed being elected Commissioner of Baseball in 1969.

Feeney was a respected figure among writers and fellow executives. After Feeney was elected president of the National League in 1970, Red Smith described him as "a class guy, a gentleman, a delightful companion."

== Early life and career ==
Feeney was born in Orange, New Jersey to Thaddeus Feeney and Mary Alice (Stoneham) Feeney. Mary Alice was the daughter of Charles Stoneham, principal owner of the New York Giants from 1919 until his death in 1936, and the sister of Horace Stoneham, who owned the Giants from 1936 through 1976 and transferred the team to San Francisco in 1958.

Charles Stoneham felt that every boy should want to be a baseball star, but his grandson was not athletically gifted. Feeney was a batboy for the Jersey City Giants, a farm team of the New York Giants, but that was the limit of his athletic career on the diamond.

Instead, Feeney attended Dartmouth College, where became assistant manager of the school's baseball team as a sophomore, eventually working his way up to manager. The team was coached by Jeff Tesreau, a former Giants player himself, who instilled values of working toward establishing a solid basis for consistent victory as a program. After graduation from Dartmouth in 1943, Feeney served in the United States Navy until the end of World War II, about two and a half years. Upon separation from the Navy, he joined the New York Giants front office at the age of 24 as vice president in 1946 while he attended Fordham Law School. He passed the New York Bar exam in 1949 and by 1950, Feeney was in effect the general manager of the Giants.

== Two pennants in Manhattan ==
On July 16, 1948, Stoneham and Feeney made a dramatic change. They replaced manager Mel Ott, a popular, Hall of Fame hitter and lifelong Giant, with the controversial and abrasive Leo Durocher, who had been managing their bitter crosstown rivals, the Brooklyn Dodgers. Asked by Stoneham to evaluate his new team, Durocher reportedly replied: "Back up the truck", meaning wholesale changes were needed.

In 1951, the Giants battled back from a 13 1/2 game deficit on August 11, winning 37 of their last 44 games to force a best-of-three pennant playoff with Brooklyn. After splitting the first two games, the Giants overcame one last hurdle — a 4–1, ninth-inning Brooklyn lead in Game 3 — to beat the Dodgers on Bobby Thomson's three-run home run, baseball's version of the "Shot Heard 'Round the World." The Giants had won their first National League pennant since 1937, but they dropped the 1951 World Series in six games to the New York Yankees.

Brooklyn dominated the NL for the next two seasons, but, in 1954, Durocher's Giants — led by the league's two leading hitters, batting champion Willie Mays and runner-up Don Mueller — won the pennant by five games. They drew the Cleveland Indians, who had set an American League record by winning 111 games, as their opponents in the 1954 World Series. But the Giants won in four straight games, highlighted by Mays' game-saving catch of Vic Wertz' long drive in Game 1, the clutch hitting of obscure outfielder and pinch hitter Dusty Rhodes, and effective pitching from four different starters.

Unfortunately, the 1954 Fall Classic was the last highlight of the Giants' 70-plus year history in New York City. Attendance plunged in the years that immediately followed, and after Durocher's resignation in 1955 to become a "Game of the Week" baseball broadcaster, the team played poorly. By 1957, owner Stoneham had decided to leave for greener pastures, ultimately choosing San Francisco as the team's destination to preserve its historic rivalry with the Dodgers, who simultaneously moved to Los Angeles.

== Contenders, and mainly bridesmaids, in San Francisco ==
The Giants returned to the first division upon moving to the West Coast, led by players produced by the club's minor league system. Feeney and minor league director Carl Hubbell, the Hall of Fame pitcher, had stocked the team with outstanding young talent — especially African-American and Latin-American players, exploiting lingering prejudice by most other Major League clubs. The Giants were the first team to sign players from the Dominican Republic, bringing to San Francisco stars such as Juan Marichal, Felipe Alou and Matty Alou. The Giants also were the first MLB team to sign a player from Japan, Masanori Murakami, a left-handed pitcher who debuted in 1964.

In 1962, the Giants and Dodgers engaged in a West Coast version of the 1951 pennant chase. The Dodgers built an early lead in the National League race, but began to fall to earth when ace left-hander Sandy Koufax was sidelined by a finger ailment. By season's end, the teams were deadlocked, at 101 wins and 61 defeats. Again, a best-of-three playoff would determine the champion, and — again — the Giants would rally in the ninth inning of Game 3 (this time from a 4–2 deficit) to beat the Dodgers. But the deciding game was played in Los Angeles, thus the winning run — forced in by a bases-loaded walk — was not a "walk-off" situation and lacked the drama of Thomson's home run. The Giants, as in '51, faced the Yankees in the 1962 World Series and lost, this time in seven games.

Although San Francisco remained a first-division team, and frequent contender, during the rest of the 1960s, it did not win another pennant in the decade; in fact, the team won one division championship from 1969 through 1986 (1971), and did not appear in the World Series again until 1989. The Giants finished in second place for four successive seasons (1965–68). By 1969, the team was showing signs of age and decline. Concurrently, Feeney was being considered for prominent positions within Major League Baseball's hierarchy. After his candidacy for Commissioner of Baseball fell short, Feeney succeeded Warren Giles as National League president on December 5, 1969.

== President of the National League ==
During his 17-year (1970–86) presidency, the National League continued its dominance of the All-Star Game, losing only in 1971, 1983 and 1986 and winning 14 times, although the American League prevailed in the World Series, 9–8, during this period. The NL also dominated the Junior Circuit in home attendance, outdrawing its rival league in each of Feeney's 17 years as chief executive, including the period of 1977–86, when the AL had two more member teams. Feeney rallied NL owners to resist adoption of the designated hitter and presided over a period of stability, as the league neither expanded nor moved a franchise during his term. (Ironically, the NL team that came closest to moving was Stoneham's Giants, which were nearly sold to a Toronto consortium in 1976. The owner who saved the Giants for San Francisco in 1976, Bob Lurie, nearly moved the team to St. Petersburg, Florida in 1992.)

Just before his tenure as NL president ended, he made an appearance on Jeopardy! in the revived show's second season in 1986.

As he passed his 65th birthday, Feeney was succeeded as NL president by A. Bartlett Giamatti. His baseball career concluded with a 15-month tour as president of the San Diego Padres (1987–88), which ended with his resignation the day after he gave the finger to fans carrying a "SCRUB CHUB" sign on Fan Appreciation Night in San Diego on September 24, 1988.

Feeney died on January 10, 1994, of a heart attack in San Francisco at the age of 72. He is interred at Skylawn Memorial Park in San Mateo, California. Survivors included his daughter Katy (1949–2017), who was a longtime senior executive for both the National League and Major League Baseball.
