= Rhea Boyd =

American paediatrician

Rhea W. Boyd
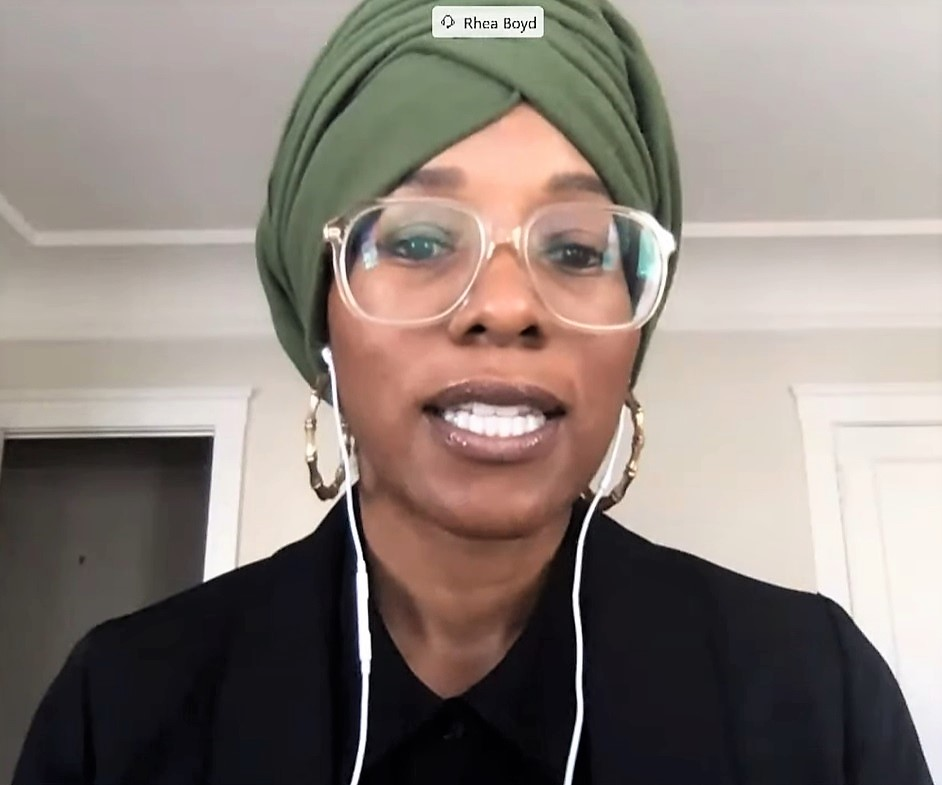
- Boyd speaks to the United States House Committee on Energy and Commerce in 2020
- Born: Akron, Ohio
- Education: University of Notre Dame (BA); Vanderbilt University (MD); Harvard T.H. Chan School of Public Health (MPH)
- Scientific career
- Workplaces: University of California, San Francisco

Rhea W. Boyd is an American pediatrician and child and community health advocate. Boyd is a popular science communicator, making use of social media to amplify a diverse range of voices in an effort to improve the heath of communities of colour.

== Early life and education ==
Boyd grew up in Los Angeles and Akron, Ohio. As a child, Boyd attended a predominantly-white Catholic school. She wanted to be a physician.

In 2006, Boyd received a bachelor's degree in a customized program of Africana studies and health from the University of Notre Dame. While in college she was a journalist for the student newspaper, where she wrote about race in America. In 2010, Boyd received a medical degree is from Vanderbilt University School of Medicine. She moved to California, completing a residency in pediatrics at the University of California, San Francisco (UCSF)'s UCSF Medical Center in 2013.

While a medical resident at University of California, San Francisco Boyd launched a blog about being a paediatrician. Boyd was part of the Paediatric Leadership for the Underserved residency, which trains paediatricians to provide healthcare for children from marginalised backgrounds. In 2017, Boyd completed a Master of Public Health at the Harvard T.H. Chan School of Public Health. She held a Commonwealth Fund Mongan Minority Health Policy Fellowship.

== Career ==
Boyd works as a clinical physician. Since she has partnered with San Diego 211 as chief medical officer. Boyd has taught academic programs on structural inequality and health. She specialises in child and community health. She has worked with physicians, professional bodies, local organizers and tech founders in the San Francisco Bay Area to increase access to health services. Following the success of her early blogging experience, Boyd launched an independent platform (Rhea.MD), where she discussed the intersection of race, gender and health. Boyd is particularly concerned about the impact of police brutality on the health and wellbeing of Black boys and men.

Throughout the COVID-19 pandemic, Boyd has spoken about the health disparities experienced by Black Americans. In response to the murder of George Floyd, Boyd became more involved with political activism and the fight for social justice. Boyd was one of many physicians who supported the George Floyd protests throughout the pandemic, saying “protest is a profound public health intervention”. In an interview with Time magazine, Boyd said, “If people were to understand that racism, and all of the social and political and economic inequalities that racism creates, ultimately harms people's health. they would see that protest is a profound public health intervention, because it allows us to finally address and end forms of inequality,”. On June 17, 2020, Boyd gave expert testimony to the U.S. Congress' House of Representatives' House Committee on Energy and Commerce on “Health Care Inequality: Confronting Racial and Ethnic Disparities in COVID-19 and the Health Care System”.

Boyd worked with Monica McLemore to devise new standards on publishing racial health inequities. Unfortunately, the academic publishing process has allowed scholarship that confuses and often attempts to minimise the role of racism in determining health outcomes. Boyd and McLemore believe that “the solution to racial health inequities is to address racism and its attendant harms and erect a new health care infrastructure that no longer profits from the persistence of inequitable disease”.Their suggestions included; (1) Denouncing Biological Race And The Insidious Harms Of Patient Blame, to stop (2) Obfuscating The Role Of Racism In Determining Health And Health Care and the implementation of more (3) Rigorous Standards For Publishing On Racial Health Inequities.

== Membership ==
- 2016–present: American Academy of Pediatrics, California Chapter 1, Board Member
- 2016–present: American Academy of Pediatrics, Executive Committee on Communications and Media, Executive Committee Member
- California Children's Trust, Director of Equity and Justice

== Selected works and publications ==
=== Selected works ===
- Boyd, Rhea W.; Ellison, Angela M.; Horn, Ivor B. (March 2016). "Police, Equity, and Child Health" (PDF). Pediatrics. 137 (3): e20152711. doi:10.1542/PEDS.2015-2711. PMID 26908673. Wikidata ()
- Chamberlain, Lisa J.; Hanson, Elizabeth R.; Klass, Perri; Schickedanz, Adam; Nakhasi, Ambica; Barnes, Michelle M.; Berger, Susan; Boyd, Rhea W.; Dreyer, Benard P.; Meyer, Dodi; Navsaria, Dipesh; Rao, Sheela; Klein, Melissa (April 2016). "Childhood Poverty and Its Effect on Health and Well-being: Enhancing Training for Learners Across the Medical Education Continuum". Academic Pediatrics. 16 (3): S155–S162. doi:10.1016/J.ACAP.2015.12.012. PMID 27044694. Wikidata ()
- Boyd, Rhea W (July 2018). "Police violence and the built harm of structural racism". The Lancet. 392 (10144): 258–259. doi:10.1016/S0140-6736(18)31374-6. PMID 29937191. Wikidata ()
- Boyd, Rhea W (June 2019). "The case for desegregation". The Lancet. 393 (10190): 2484–2485. doi:10.1016/S0140-6736(19)31353-4. PMID 31232362. Wikidata ()
- Hardeman, Rachel R.; Medina, Eduardo M.; Boyd, Rhea W. (10 June 2020). "Perspectives: Stolen Breaths". New England Journal of Medicine. 383 (3): 197–199. doi:10.1056/NEJMP2021072. PMID 32521156. Wikidata ()
- Dreyer, Benard P.; Trent, Maria; Anderson, Ashaunta T.; Askew, George L.; Boyd, Rhea; Coker, Tumaini R.; Coyne-Beasley, Tamera; Fuentes-Afflick, Elena; Johnson, Tiffani; Mendoza, Fernando; Montoya-Williams, Diana; Oyeku, Suzette O.; Poitevien, Patricia; Spinks-Franklin, Adiaha A.I.; Thomas, Olivia W.; Walker-Harding, Leslie; Willis, Earnestine; Wright, Joseph L.; Berman, Stephen; Berkelhamer, Jay; Jenkins, Renee R.; Kraft, Colleen; Palfrey, Judith; Perrin, James M.; Stein, Fernando (26 June 2020). "The Death of George Floyd: Bending the Arc of History Towards Justice for Generations of Children" (PDF). Pediatrics. 146 (3): e2020009639. doi:10.1542/PEDS.2020-009639. PMID 32591435. S2CID 220120352.

=== Selected publications ===
- Boyd, Rhea (16 June 2020). "You Realize It's a Privilege to Worry That Protests Will Cause a Second Wave of Coronavirus, Right?". Cosmopolitan.
- Boyd MD, MPH, Rhea W (17 June 2020). The Injustice of Inequitable Disease: Addressing Racial Health Inequities amid the COVID-19 Pandemic (PDF). Washington, D.C.: Subcommittee on Health of the Committee on Energy and Commerce, U.S. House of Representatives.
