= Ed Masuga =

American singer-songwriter

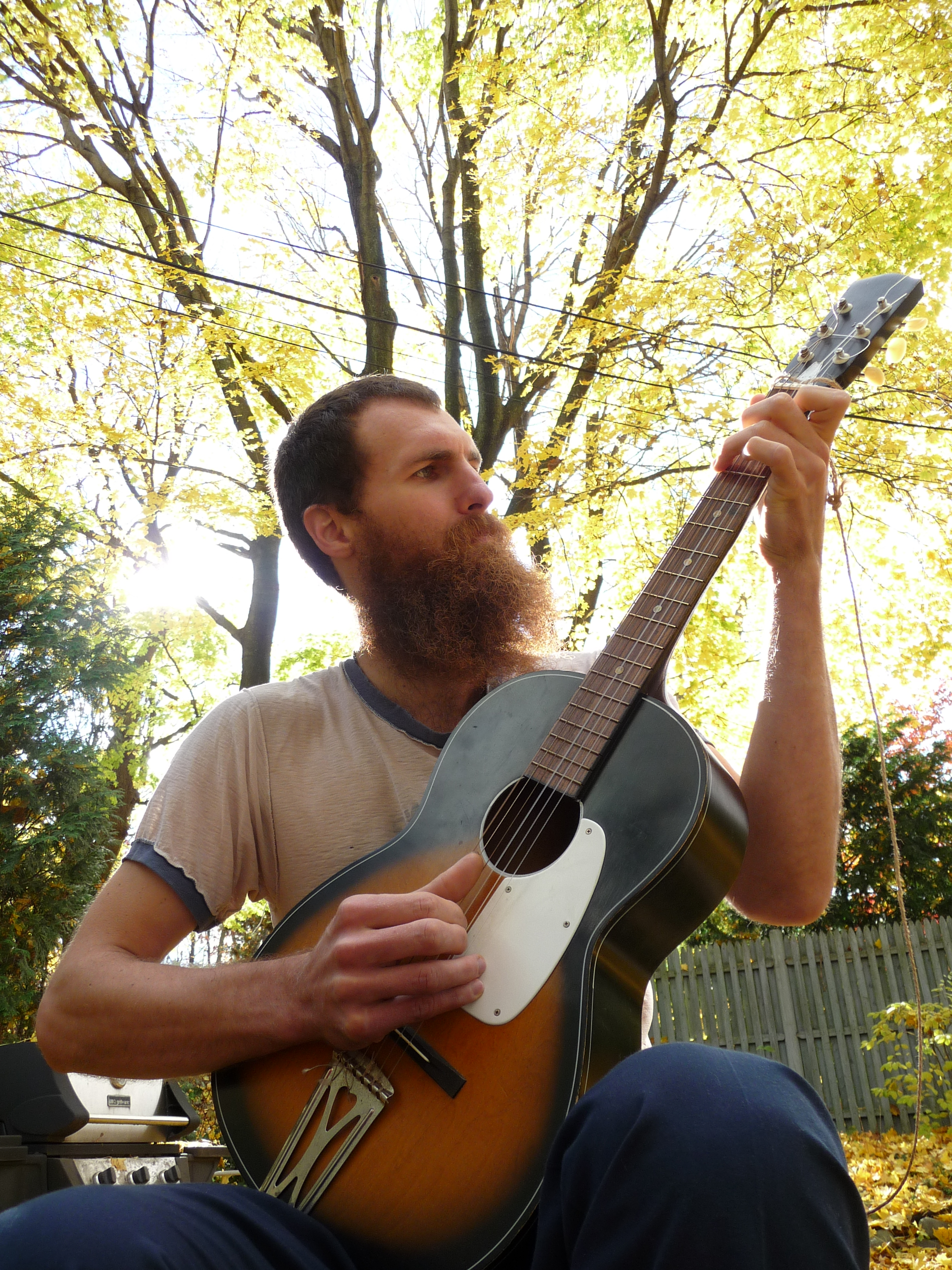

Background information
- Origin: Big Bear Lake, CA, US
- Genres: Folk, Americana, Acoustic, Country blues
- Occupation(s): Songwriter, musician
- Instrument(s): Vocals, guitar, harmonica, piano
- Years active: 2006–present
- Labels: Independent
- Website: Official website

Ed Masuga is an American songwriter, musician, and singer from Big Bear Lake, California.

Ed Masuga's music is characterized by acoustic guitar fingerpicking and a strong yet mellifluous vocal style. Although best known for his intricate guitar work, Masuga also accompanies himself on piano, banjo, ukulele, mandolin, and harmonica. He has released five independent albums: a self-titled debut album Ed Masuga (2006), Lonely Dog (2008), Let Me Tune My Heartstrings (2010), Old Moon (2016), and It's Gonna Take Years (2022).

== Biography ==
Ed Masuga is the youngest of ten siblings. After bringing him home as a newborn with the birth tag "Boy Masuga" on his wrist, his parents ended up calling him "Boy" for the first few years of his life. When they started calling him "Danny," a shortened version of his given name, he refused, preferring to go by his middle name. So struck was he by a popular country star of the time, young Ed Masuga would reply to those calling him "Danny" by saying, "I'm not Danny. I'm Eddie. Eddie Rabbit."

His drifting family was never satisfied in any one place for too long, and he grew up bouncing between shacks, motels, casinos, trailers, forests, and barroom kitchens. At the age of two years he saw his dad compete on the game show "Name That Tune," and though the appearance netted just a jukebox and a trip to Puerto Rico, Ed's future as a traveling musician had been fully inspired. Masuga moved to the San Francisco Bay Area to attend college at UC Berkeley, and initially became known in the folk music community while performing at student co-op houses.

His sister is the writer Katy Masuga.

== Discography ==
- It's Gonna Take Years (2022)
- Old Moon (2016)
- Let Me Tune My Heartstrings (2010)
- Lonely Dog (2008)
- Ed Masuga (2006)
