= Ruth Boynton =

American physician (1896–1977)

- Born: 1896; La Crosse, Wisconsin, United States
- Died: 1977 (aged 80–81)
- Education: University of Minnesota
- Scientific career
- Fields: physician, researcher, and administrator

Boynton in 1936

Ruth Boynton (1896–1977) was an American physician, researcher, and administrator who spent almost her entire career at the University of Minnesota. She worked in public health and student health services. At that time, there were few women in any of these fields. She was director of the University Student Health Service from 1936 to 1961and it was renamed the Boynton Health Service in her honor in 1975. She served as the acting dean of the School of Public Health from 1944 to 1946.

== Early life and education ==
Ruth Evelyn Boynton was born in La Crosse, Wisconsin on January 3, 1896. She was the daughter of Ervin and Nellie Alice (Parker) Boynton. She decided to become a doctor while she was in high school. Her family physician, Dr. Mary P. Houck, was said by an early colleague and friend of Ruth Boynton, William Shepard, to have set an example that influenced Boynton's decision. Dr. Mary P. Houck cared for Boynton's two brothers during their final illnesses, when they were 12 and 20 years old and Nelly Boynton who also died during Ruth's youth. She started college at La Crosse State Normal School and transferred to the University of Wisconsin–Madison. She graduated with a major in medical sciences and coursework in Latin and French.

== Career ==
Boynton graduated from the University of Minnesota Medical School in 1921. In the same year, she was hired as one of the first full-time employees at the Student Health Service. Previously, the Health Service was primarily staffed by a single employee, director Dr. Harold S. Diehl, who took her on as an assistant for three years. In her first year she treated patients during serious outbreaks of scarlet fever and influenza. She saw patients with a wide variety of diseases, including tuberculosis. Over the years, tuberculosis became a major focus of her research and publications. Boynton was Director of the Minnesota Department of Health Division of Child Hygiene from 1923 to 1927. She also spent one year at the University of Chicago, from 1927 to 1928, as the Chief Medical Advisor for Women and assistant professor of medicine. In 1929, she returned to the University of Minnesota for the rest of her career. When Diehl was made dean of medical science, he recommended Boynton for the job of Director. In his letter, he commented that he wasn't sure if a woman could do the job, but if there was one who could, it was Ruth Boynton. Because no woman had been in charge of a university health service before her, there was some hesitation to appoint Boynton, so she had to serve only as the acting director for a year.

Boynton was Director of the Student Health Service from 1936 until her retirement in 1961. During this time, she expanded it into one of the best and most complete student health services in the country. She started several new programs during her time as Director. They include a special food service for students with diseases such as diabetes, hiring health educators to promote disease prevention, and managing the use of radioactive materials on campus. She also boosted the amount of psychological and psychiatric counseling services. As Director, she served as an administrator, physician, researcher, and teacher. She also ran the U of M School of Public Health during World War II when its Director left to serve in the Army.

During her career, Boynton was active in groups such as the American College Health Association. The association now awards an annual Ruth E. Boynton Award for service to the Association. She served for twenty-two years on the Minnesota State Board of Health, and was twice elected its president, in 1945 and 1951.

== Later life ==
Boynton retired from the university in 1961. She moved to Florida where she volunteered her time as the secretary-treasurer of the American College Health Association for several years. In 1975, the University of Minnesota honored her career and contributions by renaming the Student Health Service to Boynton Health Service, the name it still bears. She died on December 21, 1977, in Miami after a brief illness. Boynton gave $20,000 to establish the Prudence Cutright Scholarship for an outstanding woman graduate student in education to the University of Minnesota in her bequest. To Boynton Health Service she gave $15,000 to establish a learning resources center for the staff.
