= Katy Wong =

American harpist

Background information
- Born: Ridgewood, New Jersey, US
- Education: Juilliard School
- Occupation: Harpist
- Website: katywong.com

Katy Wong is an American harpist, international performer, music educator, artist entrepreneur, and public speaker.

== Early life and education ==
Katy Wong was raised under difficult circumstances in Ridgewood, New Jersey, and attended the Juilliard School, studying with New York Philharmonic principal harpist, Nancy Allen. She dropped out after one year due to academic circumstances. She has performed in Carnegie Hall and Lincoln Center.

== Career ==
She has performed on four occasions at New York Fashion Week and has been featured in Vogue, Harper's Bazaar, NBC News, and SPIN.

Wong has been invited to perform as a guest harpist with the New Jersey Symphony, Buffalo Philharmonic Orchestra, and National Youth Orchestra of the United States of America all-stars orchestra. She was selected to attend Carnegie Hall's National Youth Orchestra touring seven cities in China in 2015, and Aspen Music Festival for two consecutive summers. Wong was chosen to represent the United States at the World Harp Congress' Focus on Youth in Sydney, Australia. Her solo performances have won prizes at the Soka-Japan International Harp Competition in Japan, and the Young Artist's Harp Competition in the United States.

== Recordings ==
- Elias Parish Alvars, Grande Fantaisie et Variations de bravoure, Op. 57
- André Caplet, Divertissement à la française
- Mikhail Glinka, Nocturne for Harp
- Ekaterina Walter-Kühne – Fantaisie sur un thème de l'opéra 'Eugène Onegin'
