= Katy Kinard =

American Christian musician and pianist (born 1980)

- Birth name: Kathryn Michelle Kinard
- Also known as: Katy Kinard
- Born: September 16, 1980 (age 44); Dallas, Texas, U.S.
- Origin: Nashville, Tennessee, U.S.
- Genres: Worship, Christian pop
- Occupation(s): Singer, songwriter, pianist
- Instrument(s): vocals, piano
- Years active: 2005–present
- Website: katykinard.com

Kathryn Michelle "Katy" Kinard (born September 16, 1980) is an American Christian musician and pianist, who primarily plays a style of contemporary worship music and Christian pop music. She has released four musical works, Headed Back (2005), You're Still Better (2007), Lullaby Hymns (2010), and God of Fireflies (2016).

== Early life ==
Kinard was born, Kathryn Michelle Kinard, on September 16, 1980, in Dallas, Texas, to father Terry Mac Kinard and mother Shelley Nichols Hudson, where she was raised with an older sister, Kristi. They moved to Colorado, when she was twelve years-old, eventually relocating to Nashville, Tennessee, and graduating from Belmont University.

== Music career ==
Her music recording career started in 2005, with the studio album, Headed Back, that released on February 8, 2005. While her second studio album, You're Still Better, was released on April 5, 2007. The third studio album, Lullaby Hymns: The Weary Soul, was released on June 20, 2010. She released God of Fireflies on July 8, 2016.

== Discography ==
- Headed Back (February 8, 2005)
- You're Still Better (April 5, 2007)
- Lullaby Hymns: The Weary Soul (June 20, 2010)
- God of Fireflies (July 8, 2016)
