= Rosie Roff =

English model, influencer

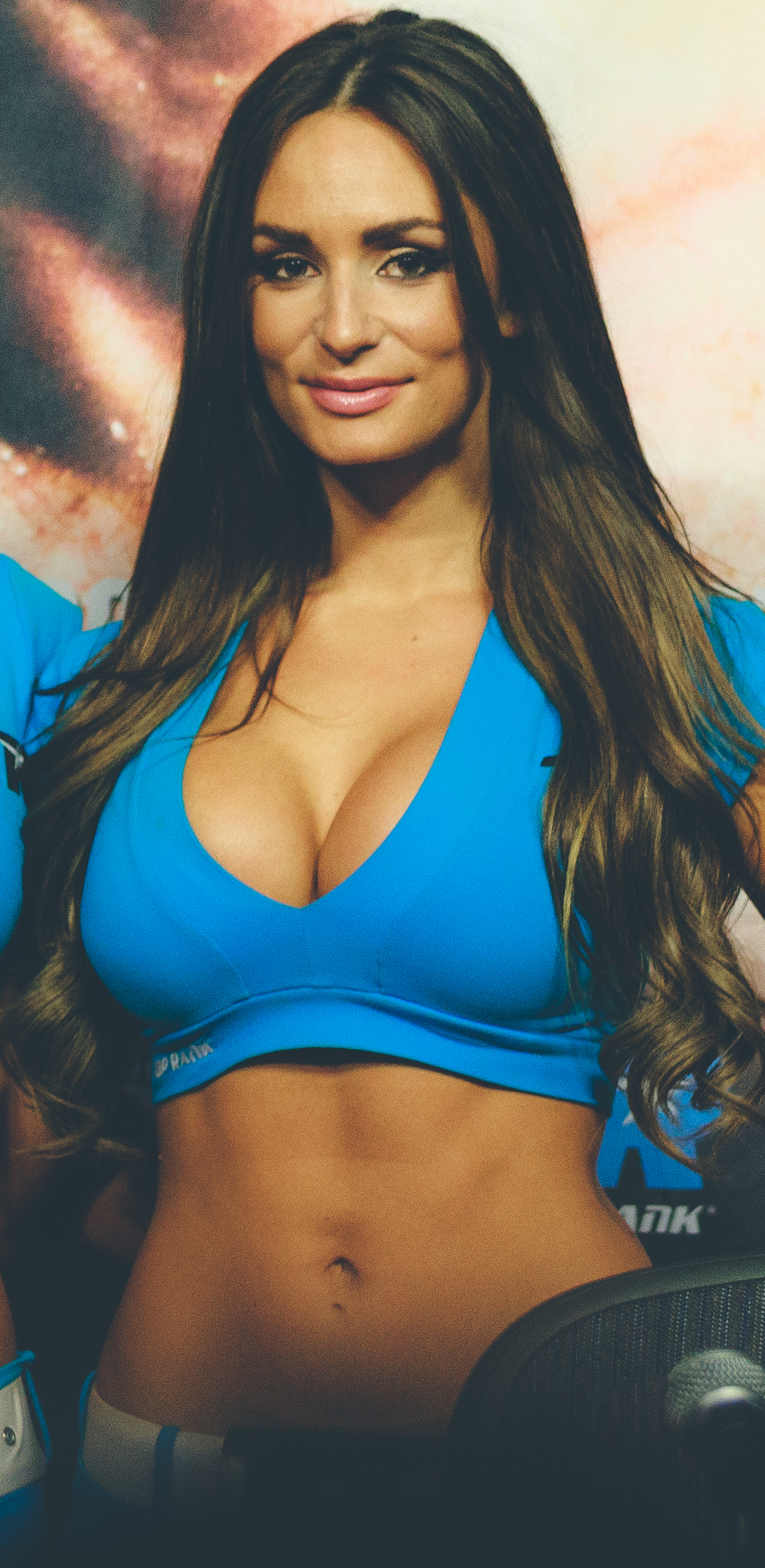
- Roff in 2013
- Born: Rosie Elizabeth Roff; 18 July 1987 (age 39); Cornwall, England
- Occupations: Model; influencer
- Modeling information
- Height: 5 ft 6 in (1.68 m)
- Hair color: Brunette
- Eye color: Hazel
- Website: shaffer-roff.com/rosie/

Rosie Elizabeth Roff is an English model, and influencer.

== Career ==
After working as a main model for Apple Bottom Jeans UK, Roff received interest from various companies. She has worked for magazines such as Maxim and FHM, including cover and worldwide editions. In 2011, she was voted by FHM as one of the "100 sexiest women in the world". Roff has been considered by FHM as their "Instagram Model of 2016."
