= Katy Feeney =

Baseball executive (1949–2017)

Katherine Willard Feeney (March 2, 1949-April 1, 2017) was an Irish-American Major League Baseball executive. She worked for MLB for forty years, under six commissioners. She retired as senior vice president of Club Relations and Scheduling. Few women reached the level of MLB executive.

== Early life ==
Feeney was born in New York City in 1949. She was the daughter of baseball executive Chub Feeney, the great-granddaughter of Charles Stoneham and great-niece of Horace Stoneham. She grew up in California and attended Connecticut College, U.C. Berkeley, and the Bank Street College of Education.

== Career ==
Feeney began working for the National League in 1977, at the time run by her father. When the National and American Leagues merged, she continued to work for Major League Baseball. She was one of the most prominent women in baseball and the sport's expert on its complicated scheduling rules. Feeney was a well known presence at games. She was often seen wearing a stylish hat. She retired from baseball in December 2016.

== Death ==
Feeney died April 1, 2017, at age 68 while visiting relatives in Maine.

== Legacy ==
To honor of Feeney's impact, Major League Baseball created an annual Katy Feeney Leadership Awards. Through the program, MLB recognizes a female employee in the front office at each of the 30 MLB teams, one from the Office of the Commissioner, and one from MLB Network to support career development, networking, and opportunities for advancement. In partnership with MLB, the Sports & Entertainment Impact Collective developed a custom professional development series for the honored leaders. The program includes a series of interactive discussions, both in person and virtually, focusing on vital topics such as leadership and mentorship, designed to empower and inspire these impactful leaders to continue changing the game.

Feeney's family created a memorial scholarship in her honor at the University of San Francisco.

== Recognition ==
- Robert O. Fishel Award for Public Relations excellence (1994).
