= Katy Valentin =

Danish actress

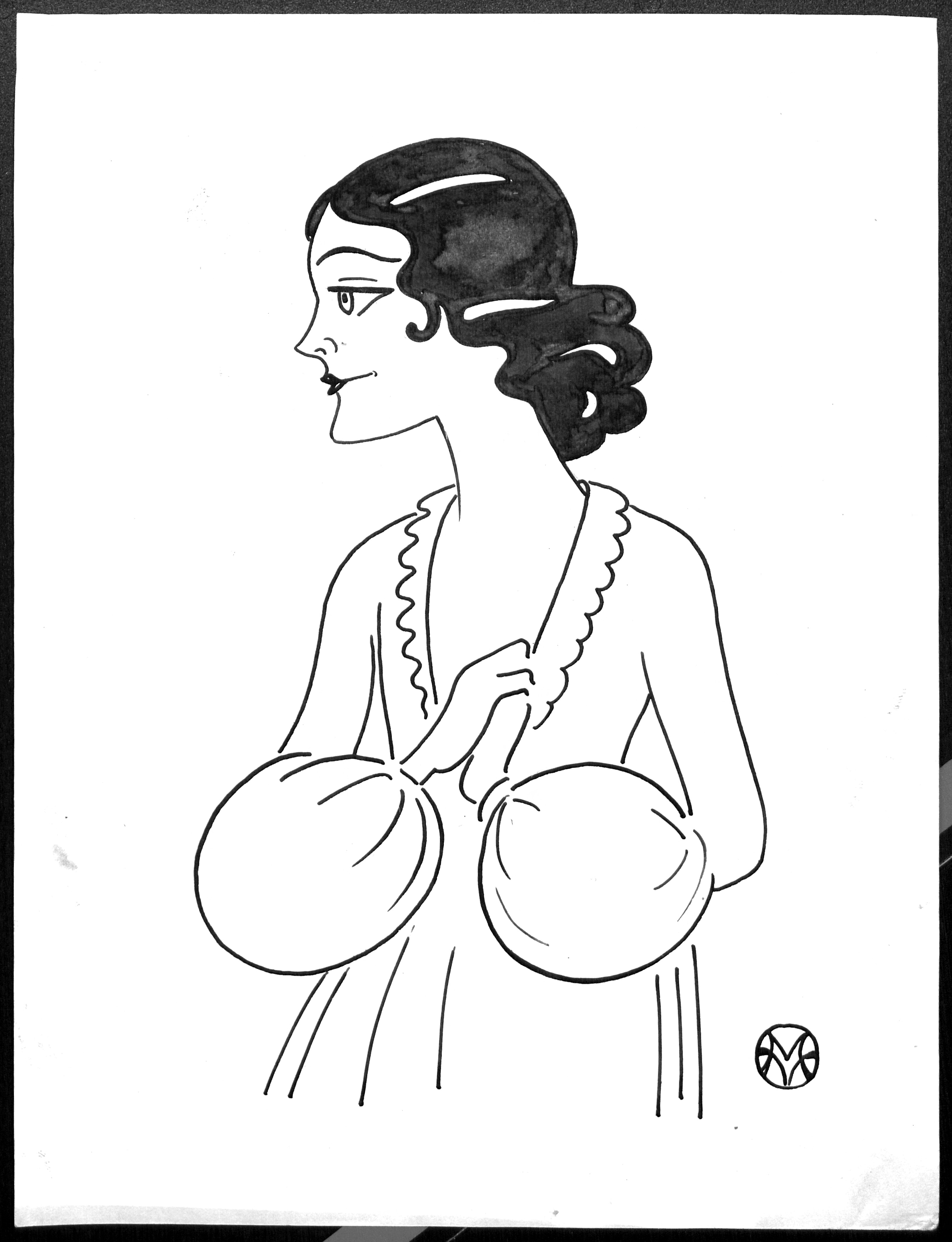
- Actress Katy Valentin wearing a dress with puff sleeves in a role ("Youth: A Play in Three Acts"? by Miles Malleson, drawn by Valdemar Møller. from 1928
- Born: 29 March 1902; Copenhagen, Denmark
- Died: 30 May 1970 (aged 68)
- Years active: 1928–1952

Katy Elise Johanne Valentin (29 March 1902 – 30 May 1970) was a Danish stage and film actress.

== Filmography ==
- Filmens helte, 1928
- Hallo, Afrika forude, 1929
- Så til søs, 1933
- Komtessen på Stenholt, 1939
- Det brændende spørgsmål, 1943
- Otte akkorder, 1944
- Elly Petersen, 1944
- Biskoppen, 1944
- Så mødes vi hos Tove, 1946
- Dorte, 1951
- Bag de røde porte, 1951
- Det store løb, 1952
