= Katy Cropper =

Welsh shepherd and dog trainer

- Occupations: Shepherdess; dog trainer
- Known for: Being the first woman to win One Man and His Dog (1990)

Katy Cropper is a Welsh shepherd and dog trainer.

A self-taught sheepdog handler, Cropper told First Women in 2016 that she had been "deliberately marked down or penalised [by men] to keep me from winning". Then, in 1990, she (with her dog Trim) was the first woman to win the BBC's One Man and His Dog sheepdog trials television series (Chirk Castle). Twenty-five years later, her daughter—Henrietta Cropper—was a finalist on the programme. As of September 2015, Cropper was a sheep dog trainer.
