= Katy Woolley =

English musician

- Born: Exeter, England
- Education: Royal College of Music, London; Universität der Künste, Berlin
- Genres: Classical
- Occupations: Musician, educator
- Instrument: French horn
- Years active: 2000s–present
- Award: Tagore Gold Medal

Katy Woolley is an English musician who plays the French horn.

== Early life and education ==
Woolley was born in Exeter and began playing the French horn at age ten having previously played the cornet. Her early teachers include Sue Dent and Simon Rayner. She studied at the Royal College of Music, London and graduated with a first class degree and was awarded the Tagore Gold Medal from the Prince of Wales. While still a student, she was appointed the Third Horn position with the Philharmonia Orchestra and also appeared with them as a soloist. She was the principal horn of the European Union Youth Orchestra for two years. She also studied with Christian-Friedrich Dallman at the Universität der Künste in Berlin.

== Career ==
At the age of twenty-two Woolley was appointed Principal Horn of the Philharmonia Orchestra. She played with the orchestra for seven years before taking a break to focus on a solo career and teaching. Having previously worked with them as an extra player, in 2019 she was appointed the Principal Horn of the Royal Concertgebouw Orchestra in Amsterdam. Woolley plays a hand-hammered Alexander 103.

Outside of her orchestral career, Woolley performed solo with the Philharmonia Orchestra, the London Mozart Players, and the New York Philharmonic. Woolley is currently professor of horn at Trinity Laban Conservatoire of Music and Dance and is the International Visiting Professor of Horn at the Royal Academy of Music. As a visiting professor, Woolley has given classes at the Conservatorium van Amsterdam and at the Sibelius Academy in Helsinki, as well giving masterclasses across Europe, South America, and Asia.
