= Katy Evans =

American romance author (born 1976)

- Born: March 3, 1976 (age 50)
- Occupation: Novelist
- Writing career
- Language: English
- Genre: Romance
- Website: www.katyevans.net

Katy Evans is the author of Real, a New York Times and USA Today best selling, self-published, (new) adult contemporary romance novel that chronicles the relationship between Remington Tate, an underground boxing champion and Brooke Dumas, a sports rehabilitation therapist. Real was released on April 9, 2013, and quickly became a best seller in the top four self-publishing marketplaces, including both Amazon and Barnes and Noble. Simon & Schuster's Gallery Books acquired rights to the Real series, which will include five books in total, in June 2013.

Real was awarded the Book Junkies 2013 prize for Best New Adult Romance novel and nominated as a Goodreads finalist for Best Romance Novel of 2013. Evans was a finalist for Best Goodreads Debut Author for 2013 for Real.

Mine, the sequel to Real, was released on November 5, 2013, and went straight to number one on the Amazon Romance Best Sellers list, as well as reaching the New York Times Best Sellers list. Her third book in the series, Remy, was released on November 26, 2013, and also made the New York Times Best Sellers list.

The following novels, Rogue and Ripped were released in 2014 and both went into the New York Times and USA Today bestselling lists, making five New York Times bestsellers in two years. For 2015, the author began a new contemporary adult fiction series and was to release a sixth Real series book through her publisher, Gallery Books (Simon and Schuster) in 2016. Evans's novels have been described as "mind-blowing" by RT Book Reviews and have been translated into ten languages in ten countries: Brazil, Czech Republic, France, Germany, Hungary, Italy, Spain, Turkey, Poland and Taiwan.

Real Series Release order:

- Real (April 2013)
- Mine (November 2013)
- Remy (November 2013)
- Rogue (July 2014)
- Ripped (December 2014)
- Legend (2015)
- Racer (2017)

The Manwhore series release order:

- Manwhore (March 24, 2015)
- Manwhore +1 (July 7, 2015)
- Ms. Manwhore (October 5, 2015)
- Ladies Man (2016)
- Womanizer (2017)
- Playboy (July 2018)
