= University of Minnesota School of Public Health =

Public health school in Minneapolis, Minnesota, US

Coordinates: 44.972394°N 93.232864°W

- Mission: Through excellence in education, research and community engagement, the University of Minnesota School of Public Health advances health—from scientific discovery to public impact—by enhancing population health and preventing disease in the U.S. and globally.
- Type: Public, public health
- Established: 1944
- Dean: Melinda Pettigrew
- Faculty: 123 primary
- Students: 1,025
- Location: Mayo Building; 420 Delaware Street SE; Minneapolis, MN 55455, U.S.
- Campus: Urban
- Website: www.sph.umn.edu

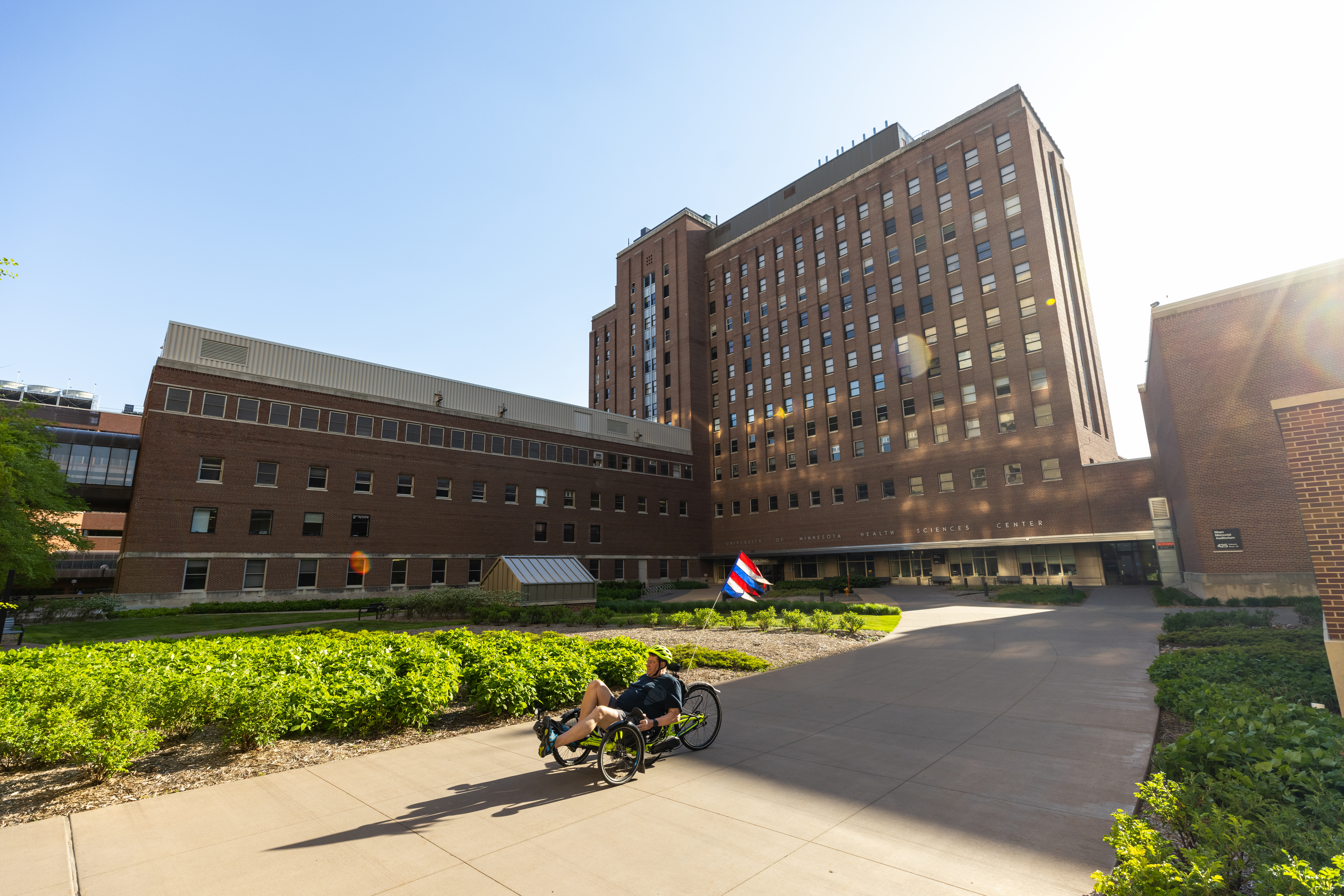
Mayo Memorial Building, main home of the School of Public Health

The University of Minnesota School of Public Health (SPH) is located in Minneapolis, Minnesota, and it is fully accredited by the Council on Education for Public Health. The school enrolls more than 1,000 undergraduate and graduate students from countries around the world.

The school is principally located in the Mayo Memorial Building on the east bank of the Mississippi River, though many of its divisions and centers are located elsewhere on the University campus and the University Research and Outreach Center. The school was built within the traditional homelands of the Dakota people and the School of Public Health has the enduring responsibility to respect and support the Dakota people's tribal rights.

In 2021 and in the wake of George Floyd's murder by police fewer than five miles from the School of Public Health, the school launched its Strategic Plan for Antiracism (SPAR) to make diversity, equity, inclusion, justice, and antiracism central to the school's operations, culture, and mission. Its guiding value is that health is a human right.

Minnesota is the birthplace of health maintenance organizations (HMOs) and many of the nation's top healthcare organizations, including the Mayo Clinic. It also is a base for medical device innovators, such as Medtronic. There is a widespread current of health awareness and action across the state.

The School of Public Health is one of the only top ranked schools of public health between Chicago and Seattle. It has a close relationship with the Minnesota Department of Health and many Fortune 500 companies. It shares a campus with five other health sciences schools—nursing, dentistry, medicine, and veterinary medicine.

The school is home to more than 20 research centers, including:

- Nutrition Coordinating Center
- Rural Health Research Center
- State Health Access Data Assistance Center (SHADAC)
- Upper Midwest Agricultural Safety and Health Center (UMASH)

Recently founded centers include:

- Center for Healthy Aging and Innovation (CHAI)
- Center for Public Health Systems
- Institute of Global Cancer Prevention Research

== Reputation and rankings ==
The School of Public Health has been among the nation's top public schools of public health since U.S. News & World Report began its rankings in 1984. In 2025, it ranked as the:

- #5 public school of public health (#14 overall)
- among the top 5% of schools and programs of public health
- #3 Master of Healthcare Administration (MHA) program
- #9 Health Policy and Management
- #11 Biostatistics PhD program

== Academic programs, degrees, and divisions ==
The school offers a BA in Public Health and many programs leading to MPH, MHA, MS, PhD, dual degrees, and degrees for working professionals, as well as certificates and postdoctoral training in various areas of public health.

The school is composed of four academic divisions:

- Biostatistics & Health Data Science
- Epidemiology & Community Health
- Environmental Health Sciences
- Health Policy & Management

National academic firsts:

- Maternal & Child Health MPH program
- Epidemiology PhD program
- Graduate minor in Health Equity
- Graduate minor in Sexual Health

== History ==
In 1874, University of Minnesota (UMN) president William Watts Folwell named Charles N. Hewitt, a Civil War surgeon and secretary of the Minnesota State Board of Health, as the Non-Resident Professor of Public Health, likely the first U.S. academic appointment in the field. The UMN Board of Regents established the Department of Preventive Medicine and Public Health in 1922 as part of the Medical School. In 1931, it began offering public health correspondence courses free of charge to all Minnesotans. The department added biostatistics to its disciplines in 1936 and in 1940, it began offering an MPH degree.

In 1937, noted physiologist Ancel Keys founded the Laboratory of Physiological Hygiene in the Department of Preventive Medicine and Public Health. The lab became an internationally recognized research center for human physiology and nutrition. It was notable for developing K-Rations ("K" because it was phonetically distinct from other rations with letter names) for the military. During World War II, it conducted the Minnesota Starvation Experiment in 1944–45 to shed light on the psychological and physical effects of starvation and best practices for rehabilitation.

In 1944, the University of Minnesota transformed the Department of Preventive Medicine and Public Health into the School of Public Health. Endowments from William and Charles Mayo in 1939 helped build the Mayo Memorial Building where the school is headquartered. Their endowments also funded the Mayo Professorship in Public Health in 1946, the first fully endowed professorship at the University of Minnesota.

Also in 1946, SPH became one of the first nine schools of public health to be accredited by the American Public Health Association. In that same year, the school became the first in the country to grant a master's degree in hospital administration. It was later expanded as a master's degree in healthcare administration (MHA), ranked as one of the best in the country. In 1948, the school established the Mayo Chair in Public Health with funds from the Mayo Foundation.

In the 1950s, SPH founded the nation's first doctoral program in epidemiology (1958) and began a series of major cardiovascular disease (CVD) studies. These included the U.S. Railroad Study, the first nationwide study of occupational activity and heart attacks, and the Seven Countries Study, the first population comparison of diet, risk factors, and rates of heart attack and stroke. (See more below.) Ancel Keys designed and ran the Seven Countries Study. Because of the significance of its findings, Time magazine put Keys on its cover in 1961.

As the school added faculty, it took on new research areas, including tobacco use, maternal and child health, infectious diseases, and healthcare administration. Beginning in 1973, clinical trial design was strengthened through the Coordinating Centers for Biometric Research (CCBR). In 2022, CCBR garnered more NIH research funding than any other entity at the University of Minnesota.

In 1997, the school established Project EAT, a research study with the goal of learning more about the broad spectrum of eating and weight-related problems in young people to guide interventions. Project EAT has since become the largest, most comprehensive longitudinal body of research to examine a broad array of weight-related outcomes from adolescence through adulthood. The school founded the Center for Aging, now the Center for Healthy Aging and Innovation (CHAI), in 1994 and the Division of Health Policy and Management (HPM) in 2005. Between 2015 and 2023, a dedication to equity saw the formation of such entities as the Health Equity Work Group.

== Health research ==
Since its inception, the School of Public Health has become known for top-ranked programs and seminal work in such areas as cardiovascular disease, nutrition, tobacco use and vaping, HIV/AIDS, injury and violence prevention, rural health, and structural racism.

The school has directed some of the most significant studies of heart-attack risk factors and prevention, with the first being the Seven Countries Study (1967–1978) whose findings disproved the notion that cardiovascular disease was a natural element of aging and is, instead, linked to lifestyle and diet, particularly a diet high in animal fat. Study findings were the basis for the Mediterranean diet, considered among the healthiest in the world.

Clinical trials run from the school's Coordinating Centers for Biometric Research (CCBR) broke new ground in cardiovascular disease research. The Multiple Risk Factor Intervention Trial (MRFIT), for example, which ran from 1973 to 1982, tested whether lowering elevated serum cholesterol and diastolic blood pressure and ceasing cigarette smoking would reduce coronary heart disease mortality. Two CCBR trials in the early 2000s, SMART and START, focused on when to administer antiretroviral treatment for HIV and changed protocols around the world.

The school's work around tobacco use and vaping has had a significant impact on nationwide trends. Leonard Schuman played a key role in drafting the 1964 Surgeon General's Report definitively linking smoking to cancer. By 1968, 78% of Americans believed smoking causes cancer, up from 44% in 1958. SPH research played a role in the 1990 legislation that banned cigarette vending machines in public places, discovered that smoking leaves an epigenetic "shadow" on one's genes no matter when one quits, identified the risk of having an abdominal aortic aneurysm drops when smokers quit, and found that a cancer-causing chemical forms in the bodies of people who vape, research that influenced legislation on flavored vaping liquid. The school's Institute for Global Cancer Prevention Research continues to break new ground around cancer prevention, especially cancers related to tobacco. In 2015, the school began investigating high rates of illness and death among birthing people and that led to research into rural birthing opportunities, midwifery, and doula care. The work resulted in Minnesota legislation that allows Medicaid payment for services from a certified doula for pregnant people. The school's continues work into health equity for rural populations, including access to medical and mental health care, LGBTQ+ rights, transportation and housing.

=== Impact ===
- National action related to rural hospital closures
- Method to contain PFCs (now called PFAs) to protect drinking water and the environment (2018)
- First association between e-cigarettes and cancer-causing agents (2018)
- Lowering of suggested age for colonoscopies to 45 (2018)
- Verification of new treatment plans for people with HIV, saving millions of lives
- Legislation that allows Medicaid payment for services from a certified doula for pregnant women in Minnesota
- FDA-proposed restrictions of tanning bed use by people 18 years of age and younger (2015)
- Discovery of an association between mining dust exposure and cases of mesothelioma (2014)
- First report card for quality of life in nursing homes (2010)
- Development of the Minnesota Model used nationwide to track foodborne illness outbreaks (year?)
- First city-wide ban of cigarette vending machines in the U.S. (1989)
- First comprehensive definition of childhood abuse and neglect (1984)
- Legislation that requires all new and remodeled buildings to be fully accessible to people with disabilities (1984)
- First study to show high rates of concussions associated with youth football players (1983)
- First model to predict probability of complications from radiation therapy (1981)
- Mediterranean Diet (1980)
- National Minor's Consent to Health Services Act of 1971
- Development of the Minnesota Code, the most widely used electrocardiogram (ECG) classification system for epidemiologic studies (1960)

== Faculty and past faculty ==
- Ruth Boynton, acting dean (1944–1946)
- Lynn Eberly, biostatistics professor and Associate Dean for Faculty Affairs
- Stephen Joseph, dean (1991–1993)
- Katy Kozhimannil, Distinguished McKnight University Professor
- Dianne Neumark-Sztainer, University of Minnesota Regents Professor
- Michael Osterholm, University of Minnesota Regents Professor and director of the Center for Infectious Disease Research and Policy
