= Katy Masuga =

American writer (born 1975)

Dr. Katy Masuga
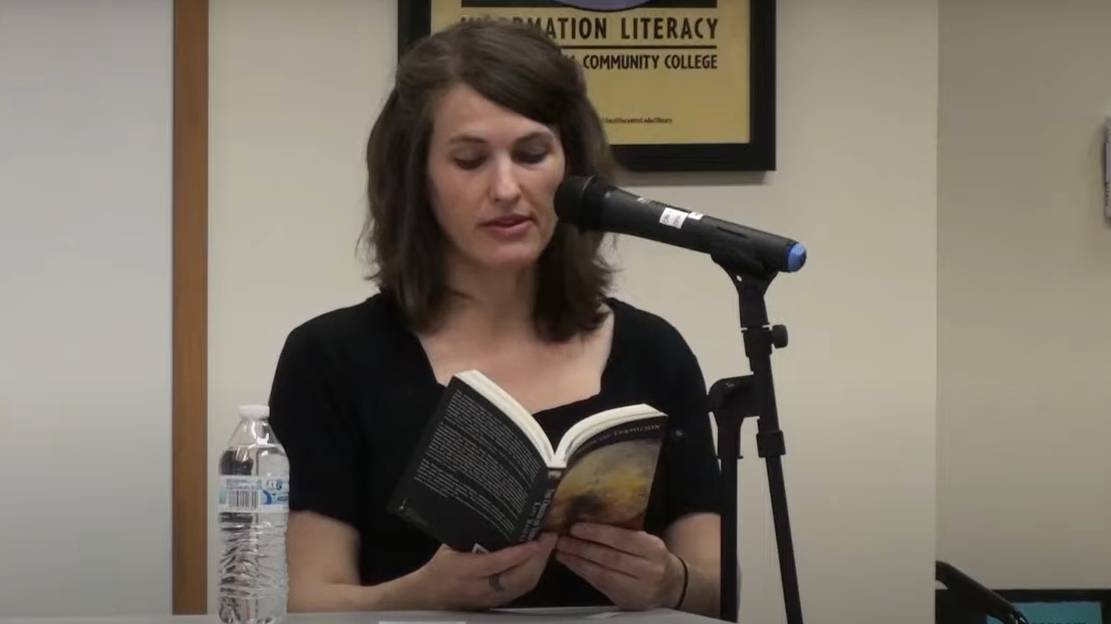
- Masuga in 2016
- Born: Cleveland, Ohio
- Education: Cal State East Bay (B.A.); University of Colorado, Boulder (M.A.); University of Washington, Seattle (Ph.D.)
- Occupations: writer, professor
- Relatives: Ed Masuga (brother)
- Writing career
- Genres: experimental fiction, literary fiction, faction, autofiction, non-fiction, essays
- Website: katymasuga.weebly.com

Katy Masuga (born 1975) is an American writer.

== Biography ==
Katy Masuga is an American writer based near Paris, France. Masuga grew up in the San Bernardino National Forest of southern California. She received a B.A. in Philosophy with a Special Option in Religious Studies from Cal State East Bay in tandem with University of California, Berkeley, an M.A. in Comparative Literature from the University of Colorado, Boulder, a Ph.D. in Comparative Literature with a joint Ph.D. in the Program in Theory and Criticism, both from the University of Washington, Seattle.

Masuga teaches for the Fall in Paris program of the Comparative History of Ideas Department at the University of Washington, Seattle. She was on the faculty of Skidmore College in Paris for 4.5 years (2012-2016) and held a postdoctoral teaching and research position at the New Sorbonne University (2015-2016), focusing on the intersections between literature and science. Masuga was the program coordinator for Trinity College in Paris until its dissolution in 2020 due to the pandemic.

Masuga studied philosophy and literary theory and criticism under Mikkel Borch-Jacobsen, notable figure in the field, in particular on the history and philosophy of psychoanalysis, especially in regard to Le Livre noir de la psychanalyse ("The Black Book of Psychoanalysis") to which he was a major contributor.

After numerous periods in Paris beginning 2001, Masuga moved permanently to France in 2010, invited by counterculture figure Jim Haynes to live at his atelier in Paris, where she regularly participated in his famous Sunday dinners, sometimes cooking for up to 100 people. He remained like family until his death in January 2021.

With Tamara Helenius, she is co-founder of Sappho Road a women's knowledge exchange in English based in France.

Her brother is the folk musician Ed Masuga.

== Writing ==
Katy Masuga is a fiction writer and a scholar in the field of literary modernism. She is a specialist on Henry Miller.

Among Masuga's publications on Miller are two books: Henry Miller and How He Got That Way (Edinburgh University Press, 2011), which examines the influence of six major authors on Miller's work, and The Secret Violence of Henry Miller (Camden House, Boydell and Brewer, 2011), which presents an in-depth analysis of Miller's subversive writing.

Masuga has written on various topics from Samuel Beckett and language games to profiles of Shakespeare and Company (bookstore) in Paris to the overlooked vegetarianism of the Creature in Frankenstein, as well as a dozen stories that blur the line between fiction and non-fiction. Her stories have appeared in various journals including Zone 3, Your Impossible Voice and Gloom Cupboard, and multiple times as a "Letter from Paris" in The Broadkill Review.

In 2017, Masuga's research group at New Sorbonne University published their findings on a project entitled "Science and Storytelling" in New Developments in ESP Teaching and Learning Research.

Her debut novel, The Origin of Vermilion, was published in 2016 by Spuyten Duyvil Press, New York. It has been called "a careful and complex study of language" in which "light, maps and mirrors make up [Masuga's] documented dreamscapes."

Masuga undertook a book tour of the Western United States in spring/summer 2016 for the launch of The Origin of Vermilion, which includes a video-recorded reading for Lit in the Library at Seattle Central University.

Masuga's writing has further been said to "mine the toxic veins of human desire, abandonment, yearning and loss found in histories that span the globe, all of which connect at their deepest points," while giving "the reader new eyes for viewing histories as stories, told by storytellers that influence the beauty, the pain and the revelations within with each turn of time and phrase."

In 2016, an interview of Masuga by Hemingway scholar Jeffrey Herlihy-Mera was included in a guest-curated essay collection of Interdisciplinary Literary Studies. In 2018, Lingua Franca, the French-language journal of The Chronicle of Higher Education, published an interview with Masuga, again by Jeffrey Herlihy-Mera.

Masuga has also published on altered books, including a profile of Doug Beube in the 2018 spring issue of Book Arts arts du livre Canada, the magazine of the Canadian Bookbinders and Book Artists Guild.

Masuga had a profile of the Henry Miller Memorial Library with Nexus: The International Henry Miller Journal in December 2018.

In 2019, Masuga served as translator and voiceover for Air France’s mindfulness and meditation collaboration with Christophe Andre based on his best-selling work Mindfulness Day after Day (L’Iconoclaste, 2011). She also served as editor and voiceover for the four-year ERCcOMICS project of the European Research Council (2016-2020) and occasionally serves as editor and voiceover for independent projects for La Bande Destinée including Sony Flow Machines, PANBioRA and the Laboratory of Computational and Quantitative Biology (LCQB) of the Sorbonne.

Her second novel, The Blue of Night, was published by Spuyten Duyvil Press in May 2020. Jillian Lauren writes, "Managing to be both heart-wrenching and hopeful, Masuga probes the very depths of what it means to be a survivor, an artist, and ultimately human."

== Bibliography ==
Books
The Blue of Night, Spuyten Duyvil Press, 2020.

The Origin of Vermilion, Spuyten Duyvil Press, 2016.
Henry Miller and How He Got That Way, Edinburgh University Press, 2011.
The Secret Violence of Henry Miller, Camden House/Boydell & Brewer, 2011.

Anthologies
"When storytelling meets active learning: an academic reading experiment with French MA students." Beaupoil-Hourdel, Pauline; Josse, Hélène; Kosmala, Loulou; Masuga, Katy; Morgenstern, Aliyah. In Cédric Sarré, Shona Whyte (Eds), New developments in ESP teaching and learning research. pp. 109–129. Research-publishing.net, 2017.
"Sylvia & Co." The Bookshop & 20th Century Literature. Ed. Huw Osborne. Bloomsbury, 2016.
"Reading with a Knife, or the Book Art of Subtraction: Brian Dettmer and Doug Beube's Altered Books." Mixed Messages: American Correspondences in Visual and Verbal Practices. Eds., Sarah Garland and Catherine Gander. Manchester UP, 2015.
“Henry Miller’s Titillating Words.” Henry Miller: New Perspectives. Eds. James M. Decker and Indrek Manniste. Bloomsbury, 2015.
“Miller's Henry and Henry's Paris.” Paris in American Literature: On Distance as a Literary Resource. Eds. Jeffrey Herlihy & Vamsi Koneru. Fairleigh Dickinson University Press, 2013.
“Locke’s Child in the Carnivore’s Kitchen.” Frankenstein Galvanized. Ed. Claire Bazin. Red Rattle, 2012.

Stories
“Shine on You Crazy Diamond.” The Broadkill Review. Vol. 9, Issue 3, March/April 2016.

“The Flophouse.” Sleepy House Press, July 2015.
“Letter from Paris: Ça va?” The Broadkill Review, July 2015.
“Letter from Paris: Your Writing Life after Being Left.” The Broadkill Review, May 2015.
“Art Untied.” Gloom Cupboard, April 2015.
“Letter from Paris.” Your Impossible Voice, April 2014.
“Biking at Night.” Your Impossible Voice, December 2013.
“Groucho Marxism.” Spaces: “The State of the Art.” dougNovember 2013.
“My Lydia Davis Encounter.” The Telegram Review, September 2013.
“Paris Perspective.” Linden Avenue Literary Journal. Issue 9, February 2012.
“Ferlinghetti Motel.” Zone Three. Issue 48, (Fall 2008): 79-80.

Essays
“The Henry Miller Memorial Library.” Nexus: The International Henry Miller Journal. Vol. 12, (2018): 143-176.
“Teaching American Literature in Paris: An Interview with Katy Masuga.” By Jeffrey Herlihy-Mera. Lingua Franca. 21 June 2018.
“Profile: Doug Beube.” [In English and French.] Canadian Bookbinders and Book Artists Guild: Book Arts arts du livre Canada, 2018.

“Transcendent Correspondence.” Eds. Jeffrey Herlihy & Vamsi Koneru. Interdisciplinary Literary Studies: Imagining Exile and Transcultural Displacement, 2016.

“Beckett, Wittgenstein and Blanchot : Language Games from Text to Theatre”. Miranda, n°4 Samuel Beckett: Drama as philosophical endgame? / L'épreuve du théâtre dans l'oeuvre de Samuel Beckett: fin de partie philosophique? Eds. Nathalie Rivère de Carles, Philippe Birgy. June 2011.
“Illusion of Force and Speed in Henry Miller.” Deus Loci: Lawrence Durrell Journal. Vol. 11, (2010): 76-107.
“Henry Miller and the Book of Life.” Texas Studies in Literature and Language. V. 52, N. 2, (2010): 181-202.
“Crossing Brooklyn Bridge: An Ekphrastic Correspondence between Walt Whitman, Hart Crane & Henry Miller.” Nexus: The International Journal of Henry Miller. Vol. 7, (2010): 101-126.
“Henry Miller, Deleuze and the Metaphor of China.” The McNeese Review. 47, (2009): 79-102.
“Transgressing the Law of Literature.” Nexus: International Henry Miller Journal. Vol. 6, (2009): 209-39.
“Entries on D.H. Lawrence’s ‘Snake’ & ‘The Ship of Death’.” Eds. James Persoon and Robert R. Watson. Facts On File Companion to British Poetry, 1900 to Present. New York: Facts on File, 2009, (432, 445-7).
“Henry Miller and the Concept of a Minor Literature.” Journal of Literary Theory and Cultural Studies. Vol. III, No. 4, (2008): 1-14.
“Henry Miller's Painterly Eye.” Journal of Humanities. Vol. 34, (Apr 2008): 173-212.
