= Katy Schimert =

American visual artist

- Born: 1963 (age 62–63); Grand Island, New York, United States
- Education: Yale University, Philadelphia College of Art
- Known for: Sculpture, drawing, installation art, film and video
- Awards: Guggenheim Fellowship, Joan Mitchell Foundation, Pollock-Krasner Foundation
- Website: Katy Schimert

Katy Schimert (born 1963) is an American artist known for exhibitions and installations that meld disparate media into cohesive formal and conceptual visual statements arising out of personal experience, myth and empirical knowledge. She interweaves elements of fine and decorative arts, figuration and abstraction in densely layered drawings and sculpture that together suggest elliptical narratives or unfolding, cosmic events. Curator Heidi Zuckerman wrote that Schimert is inspired by "the places where the organized and the chaotic intersect—the scientific and the mythic, the known and the unknown, and the real and the imagined … she creates work that exists where, through fantasy, truth and beauty meet."

Katy Schimert, Lurking Octopus, watercolor on paper, 51" x 99.5", 2014.

Schimert received a Guggenheim Fellowship in 2020, as well as awards from the Joan Mitchell Foundation and Pollock-Krasner Foundation, among others. Her work belongs to the public collections of institutions such as the Museum of Modern Art, Whitney Museum of American Art, Museum of Contemporary Art, Los Angeles (MOCA), and Walker Art Center. She lives and works in New York City and Rhode Island, and teaches at Rhode Island School of Design.

== Early life and career ==
Schimert was born in 1963 in Grand Island, New York, a town northwest of Buffalo overlooking Lake Erie. She studied sculpture at Philadelphia College of Art (BA, 1985), while also developing interests in performance and writing. After graduating, she moved to New York City, where she worked as a studio assistant to artist Allan McCollum and joined the performance company, Bricolage, as a costume/set designer and performer in reworkings of Les Liaisons dangereuses and Dracula. After enrolling at Yale University (MFA, 1989) to study sculpture, she continued to make forays into other media, including photography and drawing.

In 1991, Schimert accepted a teaching position at University of California, Santa Barbara (UCSB), where she was influenced by the landscape and the school's facilities to pursue video/filmmaking and ceramics, respectively. Her first video, Ophelia (1991–1993), featured manipulated images of the tragic Hamlet character's drowning and explored the societal constraints she faced; the film installation Sir Lancelot (Celluloid Star) (1992–1994) directed a voyeuristic gaze on its male protagonist, reversing stereotypical gender spectatorship. Schimert returned to New York in late 1994 to participate in the PS1 residency program, and after appearing in shows organized by PS1 and Artists Space, began receiving wider attention for diverse solo exhibitions at Janice Guy (1995), AC Project Room (1996) and the Renaissance Society (1997, Chicago). During that period, she was also selected for the 1996 São Paulo Art Biennial, the 1997 Whitney Biennial, and drawing surveys at MOCA Los Angeles and the San Francisco Museum of Modern Art.

Since then, she has had solo exhibitions at David Zwirner Gallery (New York, 1998–2008), Berkeley Art Museum (BAMPFA, 1999), 1301PE (Los Angeles, 2000) and the University Museum of Contemporary Art at UMass-Amherst (2014), among others. She also appeared in group shows at Tate Gallery, Pinakothek der Moderne (Munich), Brooklyn Academy of Music and Queens Museum of Art. In addition to her artmaking, Schimert has served as an associate professor of art and director and department head of ceramics at Rhode Island School of Design since 2011; prior to that she taught sculpture at New York University, Harvard University, UCSB and Yale.

Katy Schimert, Moon Rocks, terra-cotta with platinum luster, each piece approximately 7–10", 1994.

== Work and reception ==
Schimert's work balances a post-minimalist formal concern for object-making, materials and processes with a strong narrative impulse invoking myth, intuition, scientific and social knowledge, and female bodily experience. According to critics such as Roberta Smith, these elements in conjunction form elusive, sometimes visionary meanings operating "in a skipping, labyrinthine spiral" or "poetic round-robin." John Yau wrote, "Schimert isn’t satisfied by either an art that is purely visual … or by one that is essentially social in its concerns. The kind of seeing she is after connects looking outward with looking inward, the gaze merged with reflection." Writers often cite the dynamic, varied topographies of her drawings as the fullest expression of the complexities and possibilities in her work. Critics such as Jan Avgikos and Ronald Jones placed Schimert's mid-1990s work amid a sensibility Avgikos termed "retro-Romantic," which emphasized elaborate narratives, "objecthood" and social themes over the era's didactic, theory-laden approach. They connected her work to contemporaries Matthew Barney and Cindy Sherman, as well as to Symbolists such as Odilon Redon.

Katy Schimert, "Love on Lake Erie" exhibition, AC Project Room, New York, 1996.

=== Early solo exhibitions ===
Schimert's early exhibitions offered circling, visionary narratives unfolding in confessional letters, mysterious objects, films and storyboard-like watercolors. They were unified by concerns for formal relationships, the artmaking process, and intersecting themes of tragic love, gothic horror, alienated sensuality and hero archetypes developed around figures such as Guinevere and Lancelot, Neil Armstrong, and Dracula.

The exhibition "Dear Mr. Armstrong" (Janice Guy, 1995) included letters of romantic longing from hyperfeminine characters that recalled Surrealist automatic writing and Concrete poetry—and were considered controversial by some feminist critics—alongside handwrought, iridescent, undulating ceramic sculptures titled Moon Rocks. "Love on Lake Erie" (AC Project Room, 1996) combined the theme of love, notions of the Moon and its mythological connotations of the female, and imagery of the first lunar expedition. Its work included an otherworldly, silvery wall sculpture (The Moon), porcelain biomorphic objects, and diagrammatic drawings of landscapes and astronauts alongside romantic text, all revolving around analogous, barren encounters of astronaut and Moon, male and female, viewed from different points in time, distance and fantasy; an ethereal video, Future Perfect, superimposed images of a woman's speaking lips and stomach in a pink circle with scenes of the Moon landing.

In the show "Oedipus Rex: The Drowned Man" (Renaissance Society, 1997) Schimert shifted to water imagery and softer materials such as tape, aluminum foil and clay, while exploring themes of blindness, oblivion or rapture, and fate. Her semi-abstract drawings symbolically mapping Oedipus's travels (The Oedipal Blind Spot) constituted the cornerstone of the show; its works also included freestanding, biomorphic and vessel-like ceramic pieces, three-dimensional wall reliefs, and an underwater film of a man drowning in a sparkling blue sea. Some of this work was reconfigured for installations at the 1997 Whitney Biennial and her 1999 BAMPFA exhibition, which included new drawings and a letter to Freud.

=== Later exhibitions (1998– ) ===
In the first of four shows at David Zwirner, Icarus and the World Trade Center (1998), Schimert turned from the cooler, ethereal environs of the sea and Moon to the explosive, searing heat from the Sun, treated as a metaphor for the New York-defined arena of ambition, success and wealth. She was inspired by photographs of the Sun's surface and observations of its rays reflecting against, penetrating or compressed between the World Trade towers; the towers figured prominently throughout as mythical Stonehenge-like presences alongside the updated protagonist, a Wall Street trader. The show featured a blown-glass wall installation (The Sun), an array of terra-cotta flowering shapes glazed in fourteen-karat gold (Sun Spots), and intimate, cryptic watercolors delineating the story with spare images and notations; a Super-8 mm film depicted a striding young man eventually lost in sped-up, frantic trading floor scenes and blurred, tumbling shots of the towers, Sun and Hudson River. New Art Examiner critic Katie Clifford compared the show's imagery and narrative to outsider-artist work by Henry Darger, writing that it "possesses both storybook sweetness and occult strangeness."

Katy Schimert, Bent Leg (Egyptian), terra-cotta with black onyx luster, 18.5" x 16" x 8", 2001.

Schimert's next three shows focused on the body and the impact of emotional conflict and historical events such as war on human consciousness. "Body Parts" (2001) featured two sculpture installations connected by a room of ink-and-watercolor drawings. The first installation presented ceramic body parts and internal organs glazed with an opalescent, gunmetal-colored finish that were displayed on pedestals like specimens from a forensic medicine procedural or museum artifacts offered for contemplation. The second installation reconfigured these objects into a surreal ensemble: a pile of seventy mounded on a large, low square pedestal that suggested carnage (such as the recent Rwandan genocide), a mass grave or classical discards; the intervening drawings depicted a bloody landscape of death and violent passion populated with fighting and embracing figures.

"War Landscape" (2006) included large watercolor drawings, a garden-like installation of head and tree forms, a life-size figurative sculpture and a bronze head titled after the Roman god of war, Mars. The large, egglike heads (made of cast-paper) and watercolors functioned like topographies, covered with otherworldly, cosmic figurative imagery that Roberta Smith described as violent or therapeutic (e.g., the laying of hands) scenes of "Blakean transformation"; the garden consisted of a barren landscape of large, truncated wire-mesh trees, in various metallic hues. Schimert's show, "The Monster" (2008), consisted of fourteen intricate watercolors tracing various stages of man-to-monster metamorphosis as well as inner states involving pain, anxiety and loss. Painted in a murky, bruised palette punctuated by vein-like tracks and ruptures of bright color, they recalled Géricault's studies of psychiatric patients, 19th-century gothic horror, science fiction and film noir.

For "Camouflage, Ink and Silence" (UMass Amherst, 2014), Schimert presented a body of watercolors and glass and ceramic sculptures depicting a mythical, undersea (often transparent) octopus in a state of flux with the ocean. According to John Yau, she chose the octopus as a metaphor for artistic practice and the relationship to materials and processes, due to its to ability excrete ink and disappear into its surroundings (i.e., its medium). Together, the works collapsed distinctions between two- and three-dimensional space and figure and ground; the eight large watercolors (influenced by 19th-century landscape painter Thomas Chambers) divide an ever-changing ocean into a series of tightly fit, subtly modulated striations, creating a play between surface patterning and depth of field (e.g., Lurking Octopus) and a sense of filtered light that read like pieces of colored or shattered glass. Schimert generated the scraggy sculptures, which evoke the ocean floor's terrain, using a three-dimensional computer program that translated each watercolor into molds, whose forms were glazed to create illusionary depth.

In 2019, ceramic works by Schimert were included in the Whitney Museum's survey of craft-related work in postwar U.S. art, "Making Knowing: Craft in Art 1950–2019", and her work The Moon (1995) appeared in the Moody Center for the Arts exhibition, "Moon Shot," commemorating the 50th anniversary of the Apollo 11 Moon landing. In 2021, she completed a carpet design as part of a partnership between RISD professors and artists and the carpet firm Sahar Carpets to create a contemporary artists' rug collection.

== Awards and collections ==
Schimert has received a Guggenheim Fellowship (2020) and awards from the Joan Mitchell Foundation (2020, 1999), Pollock-Krasner Foundation (2001), PS1 (1994) and the Connecticut State Commission on the Arts (1991), among others. Her work belongs to the public collections of the Museum of Modern Art, Whitney Museum, Museum of Contemporary Art, Los Angeles, Walker Art Center, Albright–Knox Art Gallery, BAMPFA, Fonds régional d'art contemporain (Haute-Normandie, France), Hammer Museum, San Francisco Museum of Modern Art, Tang Museum, Wanås Foundation (Sweden), and Williams College Museum of Art, among others.
