= The Nation's Health =

- The Nation's Health front page
- Executive Editor: Michele Late
- Frequency: 10 issues per year
- Circulation: 23,000
- Publisher: American Public Health Association
- Country: United States
- Language: English
- Website: thenationshealth.org

The Nation's Health is the monthly newspaper of the American Public Health Association, a source of news from and for the public health field. The newspaper covers issues of interest to public health professionals, including news on federal, state and local public health policy; developments and trends in public health science and practice; global health issues; research findings; and coverage of state and local health departments.

The print edition has a circulation of about 23,000. It is published 10 times per year, with February/March and November/December serving as combined issues.

== History ==
Modern Medicine, a Chicago-based monthly magazine with stories on medical and health progress for physicians and others interested in administrative, industrial and social health problems, debuted in May 1919. The publication was divided into four parts: medicine in industry, medical advances and their applications, social medicine, and public health administration. The latter section was known as "The Nation’s Health" and offered material on administrative medicine, organized health services and public welfare.

In May 1921, Modern Medicine assumed the title The Nation’s Health, becoming entirely a journal devoted to public health in the broadest sense and targeted at both professionals and nonprofessionals. In 1927, it merged with the American Journal of Public Health (AJPH); for more than 40 years, "The Nation’s Health" appeared on the title page of the scientific journal as part of its official name.

In October 1970, it broke away from the AJPH and assumed its role as the official newspaper of APHA. The first regular issue of the current format was published in January 1971.

== Awards ==
Among the awards won by the newspaper are: 2009 and 2008 Excel Awards for feature writing from the Society of National Association Publications; 2005 and 2006 awards for feature series writing from the Association for Women in Communications; and 2008 and 2009 awards for writing from the Communications Concepts Awards for Publication Excellence.

== Online features and accessibility ==
The newspaper's web site features full issues of the newspaper, online-only public health news stories and archived articles. Access is by subscription or APHA membership, but some news features are available free.

== Healthy You ==
"Healthy You" is a health tipsheet in every issue of The Nation’s Health since October 2006. The tipsheet, written and researched by The Nation's Health editorial staff, offers materials on a range of health topics. Each issue addresses a single health topic. Material in "Healthy You" draws from the most current science-based research as well as sources in the public and private sectors.
