= Katy Kozhimannil =

American public health researcher

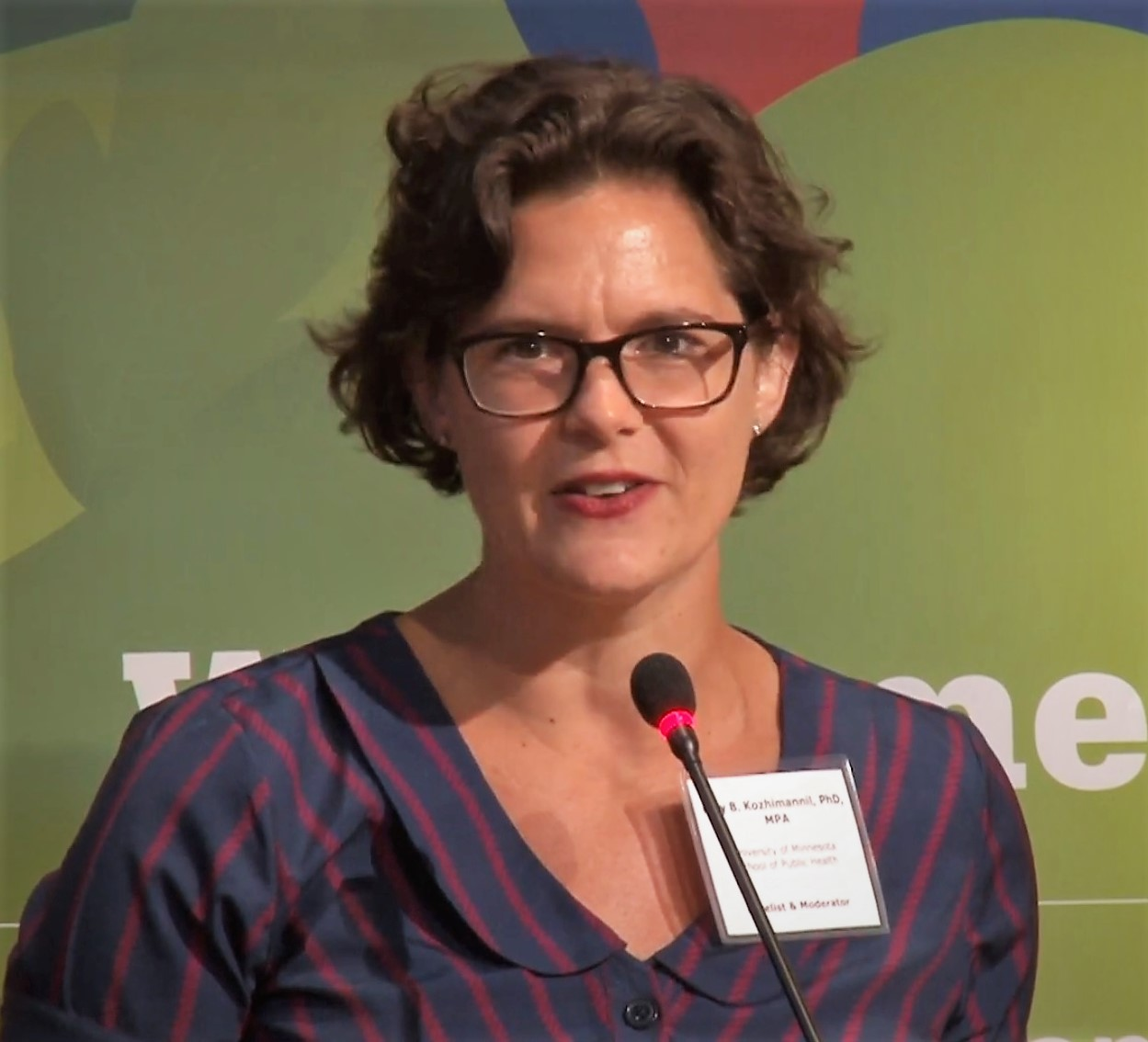
- Kozhimannil in 2019
- Education: Harvard University; Princeton University
- Scientific career
- Workplaces: University of Minnesota
- Thesis: Improving maternal health services : characterizing risks and measuring program and policy impacts (2009)

Katy Backes Kozhimannil is an American public health researcher who is a professor at the University of Minnesota School of Public Health. Her research considers maternal mortality and the impacts of structural racism on community health. In 2020 she was awarded the 25th Annual Heinz Award in Public Policy.

== Early life and education ==
Kozhimannil studied Spanish and international relations at the University of Minnesota. She moved to Princeton University for her graduate studies, where she worked toward a Master of Public Administration (MPA) in policy and administration. Kozhimannil was a doctoral student at Harvard University, where she studied physics and mental maternal health services. She has said that she became interested in healthcare policy because of the loss of a family member, who was working on a rural Native American reservation when she died during childbirth, and after learning about the significant differences in the maternal mortality of people from different ethnicities.

== Research and career ==
Kozhimannil studies the health policies that impact healthcare, quality and outcomes during pregnancy and childbirth. In particular, she has evaluated the increasing rates of maternal mortality in marginalised communities in the United States. She has shown that women who live in less populated rural communities are 9% more likely to die during childbirth than those who live in cities.

Kozhimannil has also evaluated the role of Doula care during childbirth of women on Medicaid in Minnesota, and showed that they can decrease the chances of a caesarean section, result in better birth outcomes and save money.

== Awards and honours ==
- 2015 Labelle Lectureship in Health Services Research
- 2016 HCUP Outstanding Article of the Year Award
- 2016 Alice S. Hersh New Investigator Award
- 2018 Carol Weisman and Gary Chase Gender Based Award
- 2020 Heinz Award for Public Policy

== Selected publications ==
- Kozhimannil, Katy Backes; Law, Michael R.; Virnig, Beth A. (2013-03-01). "Cesarean Delivery Rates Vary Tenfold Among US Hospitals; Reducing Variation May Address Quality And Cost Issues". Health Affairs. 32 (3): 527–535. doi:10.1377/hlthaff.2012.1030. ISSN 0278-2715. PMC 3615450. PMID 23459732.
- Hardeman, Rachel R.; Medina, Eduardo M.; Kozhimannil, Katy B. (2016-12-01). "Structural Racism and Supporting Black Lives — The Role of Health Professionals". New England Journal of Medicine. 375 (22): 2113–2115. doi:10.1056/NEJMp1609535. ISSN 0028-4793. PMC 5588700. PMID 27732126.
- Kozhimannil, Katy Backes (2009-02-25). "Association Between Diabetes and Perinatal Depression Among Low-Income Mothers". JAMA. 301 (8): 842–7. doi:10.1001/jama.2009.201. ISSN 0098-7484. PMID 19244191.
