= Liverpool Biennial =

Contemporary art festival in Liverpool

Coordinates: 53.409°N 2.981°W

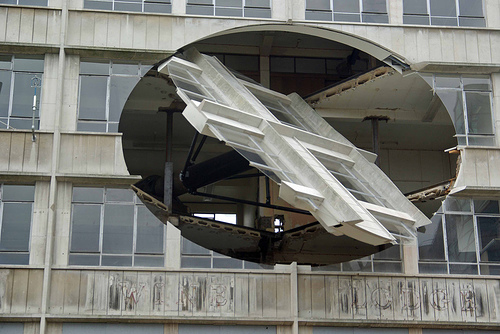
Turning the place over by Richard Wilson

Liverpool Biennial is the largest international contemporary art festival in the United Kingdom.

Since its launch in 1998, Liverpool Biennial has commissioned over 400 new artworks and presented work by over 592 artists from around the world.

== History ==
Liverpool Biennial was established by James Moores (with Jane Rankin Read, Lewis Biggs and Bryan Biggs) in 1998 and has presented festivals in 1999, 2002, 2004, 2006, 2008 (as part of Liverpool's year as European Capital of Culture), 2010, 2012, 2014, 2016, 2018, 2021, 2023 and 2025. As of 2021, Dr Samantha Lackey is the Director of Liverpool Biennial.

The Biennial exhibition is supported by FACT (the Foundation for Art and Creative Technology), Tate Liverpool, National Museums Liverpool, Bluecoat, and Open Eye Gallery.

Since 2006, the Liverpool Biennial has included 'collateral' events organised and supported by embassies, international agencies, or galleries, and promoted by Liverpool Biennial as a part of the programme. In 2010, for the first time, the biennial offered a platform for exhibitions organised overseas and promoted under the title City States. Visitors to the Biennial spent £27 million total in 2010.

Liverpool Biennial has a year-round programme of commissioning art for the public realm, such as Richard Wilson's Turning the Place Over and Antony Gormley's Another Place at Crosby Beach. The organizers also promote an ongoing educational programme. The Biennial coincides with the John Moores Painting Prize, an open submission award to the best contemporary painting in the UK. The winning work and shortlisted pieces are exhibited at the Walker Art Gallery as part of the Liverpool Biennial programme.

== Biennials ==
=== 2004 ===
In 2004, the festival caused controversy by exhibiting a work by Yoko Ono entitled My mummy was beautiful. This was a series of full colour photographs of a woman's breast and crotch, which were exhibited throughout the city centre. Peter Johansson's Swedish red was a one-room house at the Pier Head painted bright red and playing ABBA's record "Dancing Queen". The Walker Art Gallery mounted The Stuckists Punk Victorian, the first major show of the Stuckist artists, who had not previously been given official recognition.

Participating artists included Lara Almarcegui, Ursula Biemann, Yael Bartana, Luis Camnitzer, Paolo Canevari, Billy Childish, Amanda Coogan, Marysia Lewandowska & Neil Cummings, Dias & Riedweg, Maria Eichhorn, Carl Michael von Hausswolff, Satch Hoyt, Huang Yong Ping, Sanja Ivekovic, Francesco Jodice, Peter Johansson, Yeondoo Jung, Werner Kaligofsky, Germaine Koh, Andreja Kuluncic, Oswaldo Macia, Jill Magid, Inigo Manglano-Ovalle, Esko Männikkö, Dorit Margreiter, Cildo Meireles, Takashi Murakami, Yoko Ono, Mathias Poledna, Marjetica Potrc, Raqs Media Collective, Navin Rawanchaikul, Martha Rosler, Santiago Sierra, Valeska Soares, Rirkrit Tiravanija, Yang Fudong, Oliver Bancroft, Thomas Bangsted, David Blandy, Margarita Bofiliou, Dave Carbone, Lali Chetwynd, Petros Chrisostomou, Joe Clark, James Connelly, Tessa Farmer, Oriana Fox, Sarah Gilder, Anton Goldenstein, Mauricio Guillen, Thomas Hylander, Yvonne Jones, Samson Kambalu, Ahn Kang-hyun, Karoly Kesaru, Heidi Kilpelainen, Steven Lowery, Nicky Magliulo, Gary McDonald, Sarah Michael, Thomas Needham, Robert Nichol, Jesse Richards, David Rowland, Michael Sailstorfer, Margaret Salmon, Qasim Riza Shaheen, Shen Yuan, Heiko Tiemann, Douglas White, Lynette Yiadom-Boakye, Goang-ming Yuan.

=== 2006 ===
In 2006, there were five exhibition strands—International 06, International +, John Moores 24, the Independents and New Contemporaries.

Participating artists included Monica Bonvicini, Mark Bradford, Matthew Buckingham, Chen Chieh-Jen, Esra Ersen, Carlos Garaicoa, Simryn Gill, Shilpa Gupta, Jeppe Hein, Oscar Melgar & Jesus Javier Jaime, Toba Khedoori, Hans-Peter Kuhn, Ken Lum, Teresa Margolles, Kelly Mark, Lee Mingwei, Priscilla Monge, Mario Navarro, Lisa Oppenheim, Philippe Parreno, Anu Pennanen, Amalia Pica, Jean-François Prost, Rigo 23, Qasim Riza Shaheen, Shimabuku, Julianne Swartz, The Kingpins, Kuang-Yu Tsui, Adriana Varejao, Humberto Velez, Matej Andraz Vogrincic, Apichatpong Weerasethakul, Jun Yang, Yang Jiechang.

=== 2008 ===
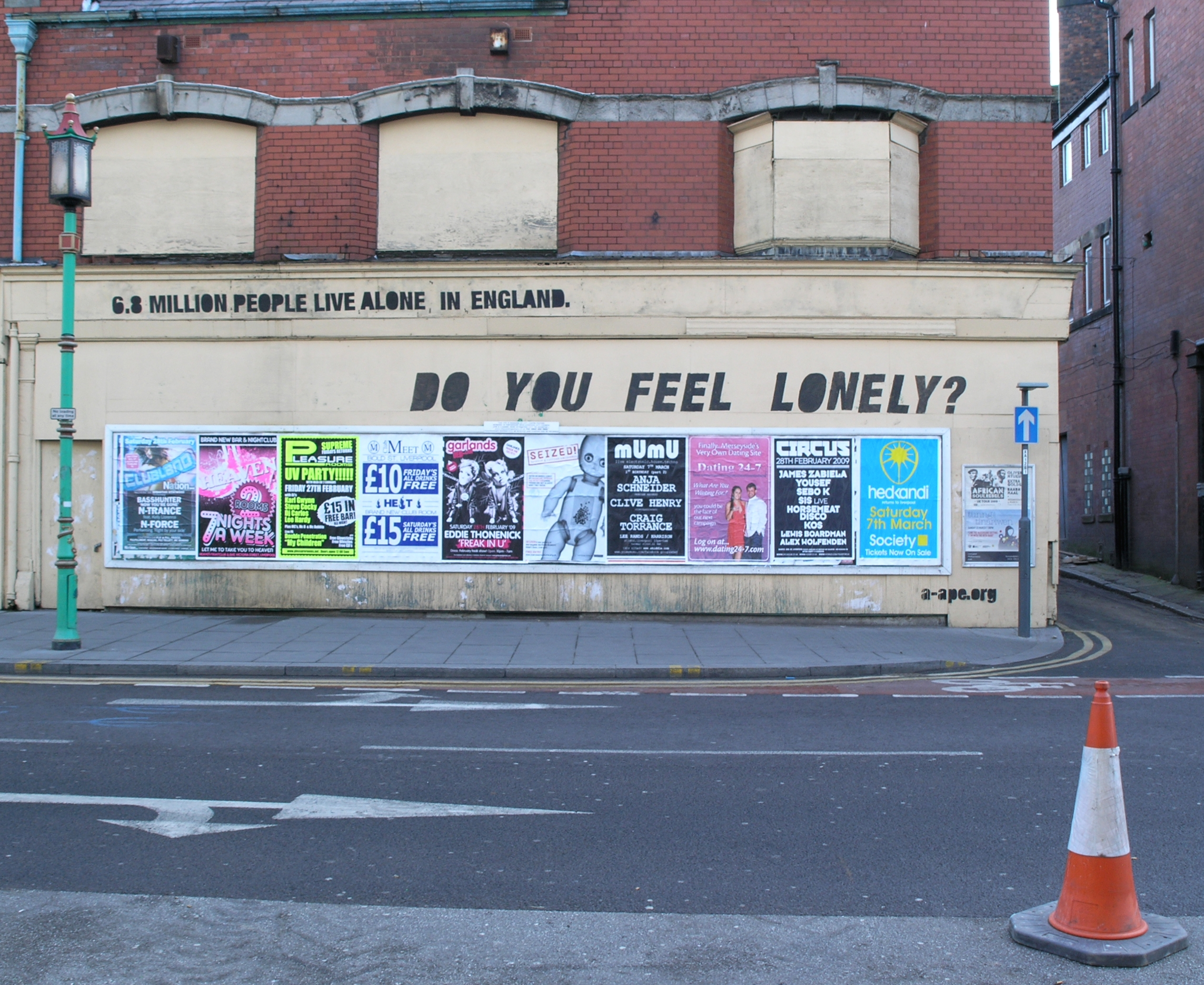
One Year in Liverpool

The theme and title of the Biennial's showpiece International 08 exhibition was "Made Up".

Throughout 2008 as part of Liverpool's year as European Capital of Culture, new commissions for the public realm included Winter Lights (a series of neon lights by international artists, such as Frank Scurti and Michael Pinsky, in collaboration with local communities), Visible Virals (interventionist artworks in public spaces and buildings in the city), and a series of Pavilions (creating spaces for cultural activity in local communities).

Again there was also the John Moores Painting Prize (No. 25), the New Contemporaries and The Independents.

Participating artists included Ai Weiwei, David Altmejd, Atelier Bow-Wow, Guy Ben-Ner, Manfredi Beninati, David Blandy, U-Ram Choe, Adam Cvijanovic, Nancy Davenport, Diller Scofidio + Renfro, Leandro Erlich, Omer Fast, Adrian Ghenie, Rodney Graham, Tue Greenfort, Teresa Hubbard / Alexander Birchler, Alison Jackson, Jesper Just, Otto Karvonen, Yayoi Kusama, Ulf Langheinrich (Granular-Synthesis), Luisa Lambri, Gabriel Lester, Annette Messager, Tracey Moffatt, Yoko Ono, Ged Quinn, Khalil Rabah, The Royal Art Lodge, Sarah Sze, Tomas Saraceno, Richard Woods.

=== 2010 ===
The 6th biennial in Liverpool was launched with a one night exhibition by Filip Gilissen on 14 May 2010 and ran from 18 September 2010 to 28 November 2010. It contained six programmes of contemporary art including: Bloomberg New Contemporaries, City States, John Moores Painting Prize 2010, S.Q.U.A.T. Liverpool 2010, and The Cooperative.

Displays included works by Alfredo Jaar, Do-Ho Suh and the first UK presentation of any work by Tehching Hsieh.

The visitor centre was located in the former Rapid Hardware shop on Renshaw Street.

Participating artists included Sachiko Abe, Alfredo & Isabel Aquilizan, Laura Belem, Emese Benczur, Daniel Bozhkov, Nina Canell, Danica Dakic, Song Dong, Wannes Goetschalckx, NS Harsha, Diango Hernandez, Nicholas Hlobo, Jamie Isenstein, Alfredo Jaar, Eva Kotatkova, Will Kwan, Lars Laumann, Antii Laitinen, Minouk Lim, Cristina Lucas, Tala Madani, Yves Netzhammer, Raymond Pettibon, Ranjani Shettar, Do-Ho Suh, Franz West, Hector Zamora, Tehching Hsieh, Carlos Martiel, Kris Martin, Otto Muehl, Carol Rama, Ryan Trecartin, Magdalena Abakanowicz, Aimé Mpane, Oren Eliav, Tim Eitel, Edi Hila, Y.Z. Kami, Zbynek Sedlecky, Minerva Cuevas, Meschac Gaba, Clegg & Guttmann, Daniel Knorr, Lee Mingwei, Rob Pruitt, Anton Vidokle / Julieta Aranda, Tania Bruguera, Carlos Amorales. Liverpool Biennial 2010 was curated by Lorenzo Fusi, Artistic Director in collaboration with: Frances Loeffler and Raj Sandhu.

=== 2012 ===
For its 7th edition, Liverpool Biennial explored the theme of hospitality, inviting artists and thinkers to bring forth new understandings for our increasingly globalised and complex times. The biennial exhibition, The Unexpected Guest, comprised 62 international artists, and the Cunard Building was used as a venue for the first time. The programme included: Sky Arts Ignition Series, in partnership with Tate Liverpool, a public commission by US artist, Doug Aitken, installed on Albert Dock in a temporary structure designed by David Adjaye; American composer Rhys Chatham, known for his large-scale performance works presented a concert as part of the opening weekend; one of Argentina's most established and internationally renowned artists, Jorge Macchi, presented Refraction in the LJMU Copperas Hill Building; Israeli artist, Oded Hirsch presented Lift a work which appeared to burst through the floor of Liverpool ONE - Liverpool's retail destination.

Artists who were part of The Unexpected Guest included Doug Aitken with David Adjaye, John Akomfrah, Hurvin Anderson, Janine Antoni, Keith Arnatt, Kader Attia, Yael Bartana, Sylvie Blocher, Andrea Bowers, Sophie Calle, Rhys Chatham, Libia Castro and Ólafur Ólafsson, Enrico David, Eugenio Dittborn, Elmgreen and Dragset, Peter Fischli & David Weiss, FormContent, Dora Garcia, Gilbert and George, Simryn Gill, Mona Hatoum, Fritz Haeg, Oded Hirsch, Thomas Hirschhorn, Nadia Kaabi Linke, Markus Kahre, William Kentridge, Anja Kirschner and David Panos, Jakob Kolding, Jiri Kovanda, Suzanne Lacy, Runo Lagomarsino, Jorge Macchi, Dane Mitchell, Sabelo Mlangeni, Mark Morrisroe, Patrick Murphy, Ahmet Ögüt, Field Operations, Trevor Paglen, Christodoulos Panayiotou, Martin Parr, Pedro Reyes, Rhizome, Pamela Rosenkranz, George Shaw, Pak Sheung Chuen, Patrick Waterhouse, Mikhael Subotzky, Superflex, Sinta Tantra, Althea Thauberger, Mark Titchner, Jeanne van Heeswijk, Mark Wallinger, Jemima Wyman, Ming Wong, Kohei Yoshiyuki and Akram Zaatari

Liverpool Biennial 2012 was curated by Sally Tallant, Artistic Director; The Unexpected Guest by: Lorenzo Fusi, Curator, Liverpool Biennial in collaboration with: Sara-Jayne Parsons, the Bluecoat; Mike Stubbs and Omar Kholeif, FACT; Karen Newman, Open Eye Gallery; Sook-Kyung Lee, Tate Liverpool and Jenny Porter, Metal Liverpool.

=== 2014 ===
The 8th biennial, A Needle Walks into a Haystack, opened on 5 July 2014 and ran until 26 October 2014.

Artists that exhibited as part of A Needle Walks into a Haystack include: Uri Aran, Marc Bauer, Bonnie Camplin, Jef Cornelis, Carlos Cruz-Diez, Chris Evans, Rana Hamadeh, Louise Hervé & Chloé Maillet, Judith Hopf, Aaron Flint Jamison, Norma Jeane, Nicola L., Sharon Lockhart, William Leavitt, James McNeill Whistler, Michael Nyman, Claude Parent, Christina Ramberg, Michael Stevenson, Josef Strau, Stefan Tcherepnin, Peter Wächtler and Amelie von Wulffen.

Liverpool Biennial 2014 was curated by Mai Abu ElDahab and Anthony Huberman.

16 artists' works were shown in The Old Blind School on Hardman St. There were two external works by Carlos Cruz-Diez, including a Dazzle Ship. The Dazzle Ship project incorporated previously unreleased music from Orchestral Manoeuvres in the Dark, which was played aboard the vessel.

=== 2016 ===
The ninth edition of Liverpool Biennial ran from 9 July 2016 to 16 October 2016.

44 international artists were commissioned to create new works for locations across the city. The artists were: Lawrence Abu Hamdan, Andreas Angelidakis, Alisa Baremboym, Lucy Beech, Sarah Browne and Jesse Jones, Mariana Castillo Deball, Yin-Ju Chen, Ian Cheng, Marvin Gaye Chetwynd, Céline Condorelli, Audrey Cottin, Koenraad Dedobbeleer, Jason Dodge, Lara Favaretto, Danielle Freakley, Coco Fusco, Fabien Giraud and Raphaël Siboni, Hato, Ana Jotta, Samson Kambalu, Oliver Laric, Mark Leckey, Adam Linder, Marcos Lutyens, Jumana Manna, Rita McBride, Dennis McNulty, Elena Narbutaite, Lu Pingyuan, Michael Portnoy, Sahej Rahal, Ramin Haerizadeh, Rokni Haerizadeh & Hesam Rahmanian (Ramin, Rokni, Hesam), Koki Tanaka, Suzanne Treister, Villa Design Group, Krzysztof Wodiczko, Betty Woodman, and Arseny Zhilyaev.

In 2016, Liverpool Biennial also presented an exhibition of works by ten Associate Artists, based in the North of England: Simeon Barclay, Jacqueline Bebb, Lindsey Bull, Robert Carter & Lauren Velvick, Nina Chua, Matthew Crawley, Frances Disley, Daniel Fogarty, Harry Meadley, and Stephen Sheehan.

The Liverpool Biennial 2016 exhibition was conceived as a series of 'episodes' drawing inspiration from Liverpool's past, present and future, named as Ancient Greece, Chinatown, The Children’s Episode, Monuments from the Future, Flashback, and Software.

Among the locations for Liverpool Biennial 2016 were the Cains Brewery on Stanhope Street, the former ABC Cinema on Lime Street, the Oratory, Toxteth Reservoir, streets, squares, restaurants, a supermarket, and all the key visual art venues in the city including Tate Liverpool, FACT, Open Eye Gallery and Bluecoat. Also presented during the 2016 Biennial are the John Moores Painting Prize 2016 at Walker Art Gallery, Bloomberg New Contemporaries 2016 at Bluecoat, and the Biennial Fringe.

Liverpool Biennial 2016 was curated by Sally Tallant, Dominic Willsdon, Francesco Manacorda, Raimundas Malasauskas, Joasia Krysa, Rosie Cooper, Polly Brannan, Francesca Bertolotti-Bailey, Ying Tan, Sandeep Parmar, and Steven Cairns.

=== 2018 ===
The 2018 Biennial ran from 14 July to 28 October 2018 and was called Beautiful world, where are you?.

Artists included Ryan Gander, Suki Seokyeong Kang, and Melanie Smith.

=== 2021 ===
The 11th biennial curated by Manuela Moscoso and titled The Stomach and the Port ran from 20 March to 6 June 2021 in Liverpool and online. Artists include Linder, Judy Chicago, Ithell Colquhoun, Ines Doujak, Nicholas Hlobo, Jutta Koether, Ebony G. Patterson, Anu Põder, and Martine Syms.

=== 2023 ===
The 12th edition of Liverpool Biennial, uMoya: The sacred Return of Lost Things, ran from 10 June to 17 September 2023. The Biennial addressed the history and temperament of the city of Liverpool and was a call for ancestral and indigenous forms of knowledge, wisdom and healing. Liverpool Biennial 2023 was curated by Khanyisile Mbongwa.

=== 2025 ===
Liverpool Biennial 2025, titled 'BEDROCK', drew on Liverpool's geography and the beliefs which underpin the city's social foundations, acting as a metaphor for the people, places and values that ground all of us. It was inspired by the sandstone which spans the city region and is found in its distinctive architecture.

The 13th edition was curated by Marie-Anne McQuay and took place from 7 June to 14 September 2025.

== See also ==
- Art exhibition
- Biennale
