= Disley (disambiguation) =

Disley is a village and civil parish in Cheshire East, England.

It may also refer to:

== Places ==
- Disley, Saskatchewan, a village in Canada
- Disley Aerodrome, Saskatchewan, Canada
- Disley railway station, Cheshire East, England
- Disley Tunnel, England

== People ==
- Disley Jones, an English stage and film designer
- Craig Disley, an English professional footballer
- Diz Disley, an Anglo-Canadian jazz guitarist
- Frances Disley, a British artist, print-maker and curator
- Gary Disley, a professional rugby league footballer
- John Disley, a Welsh athlete
- Terry Disley, a jazz keyboardist
