= Kunsthalle Nürnberg =

Coordinates: 49°26′59.70948″N 11°4′56.88588″E

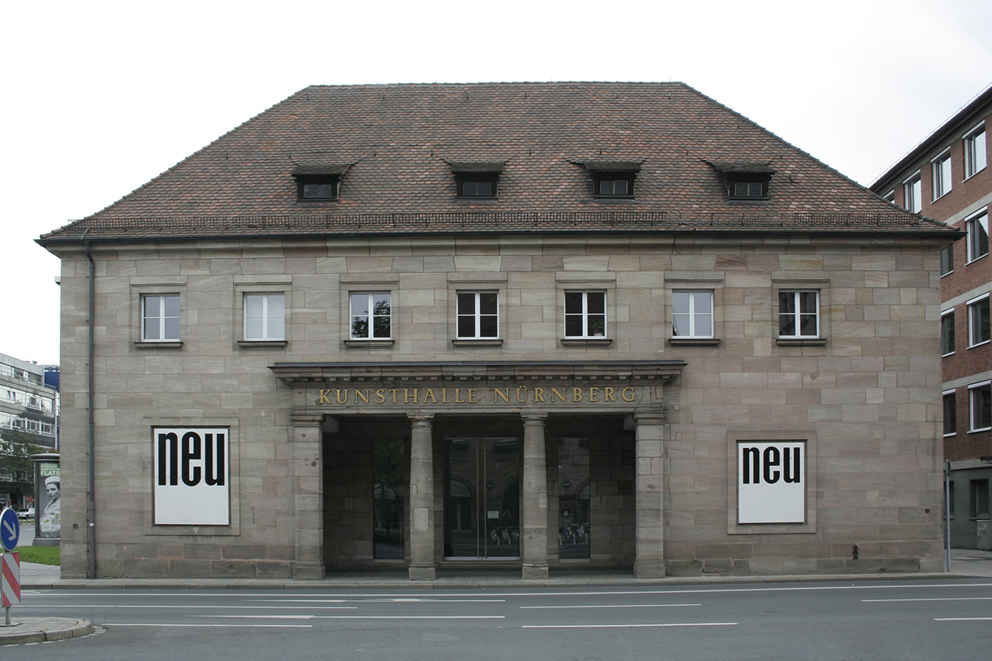
- Established: 1967
- Location: Nuremberg, Germany
- Type: Kunsthalle
- Director: Harriet Zilch
- Website: www.kunstkulturquartier.de/kunsthalle

The Kunsthalle Nürnberg is an art centre founded in 1967, near the city centre. It organizes exhibitions by contemporary international artists in its galleries in Nuremberg. The Kunsthalle commissions new work by a majority of the artists it works with.

Solo exhibitions (selection):

- 2017: Fearless Alicia Framis
- 2016: Scroll Down And Keep Scrolling Fiona Banner
- 2015: Warten auf Gegenwart II Alicja Kwade
- 2014: I tempi doppi Tatiana Trouve
- 2012: From Here to Eternity Susan Hiller
- 2011: Silvia Bächli and Eric Hattan
- 2010/2011: Mircea Cantor
- 2010: Corinne Wasmuht, Karla Black, Mathilde ter Heijne
- 2009/2010: Jürgen Teller

Group exhibitions (selection):

- 2012: Goldrausch featuring works by Pawel Althamer, Felix Gonzalez-Torres, Filip Gilissen, Jonathan Monk, Claus Richter and others.
- 2012: 30 Künstler / 30 Räume featuring works by Marc Camille Chaimowicz, Michael Beutler, Nairy Baghramian, Rosemarie Trockel, Tobias Rehberger and others.
