= Patrick Murphy (artist) =

British artist, designer and curator

Patrick Murphy is a British artist, designer and curator. His work is exhibited internationally and held in public and private collections. He lives and works in Barnsley, South Yorkshire.

== Biography ==
He works across a wide range of media and projects from large scale public art installations and interventions to print and sculptural work.

In 2021 the French city of Le Havre (UNESCO World Heritage Site) became the site of Murphys largest public art commission which saw installation of 200 life-size seagull sculptures on the facade of the cities Town Hall.

Other commissions for large scale public art include "Belonging" at Walker Gallery for Liverpool Biennial, "In pursuit of Happiness" at the Kunstenfestival in Watou, Belgium, "Flock" installation in Soho Square and the House of St Barnabas, London, "Strata", a large scale building art intervention,

His work has appeared in Creative Review, It's Nice That, Dezeen, The Guardian, BBC Radio 4, Monocle - Section D, and The Telegraph.

He is the founder and director of MADE NORTH and Sheffield Design Week and the founder of Modernist Guides. In 2015, he curated the British Road Sign Project, celebrating the road signs designed by Jock Kinneir and Margaret Calvert in 1965. Murphy invited more than 50 leading artists and designers to create their own signs which were displayed at the Design Museum and along the Thames.

Curating leading design exhibitions and projects for others including curating the MADE NORTH Gallery programme and annual conference. Major projects have included "Revolutions from Gatefold to Download", a history of the album cover to the celebration of the 50th Anniversary of the British Road Sign Project in 2016. at the Design Museum, London.
