= Karla Black =

Scottish sculptor (born 1972)

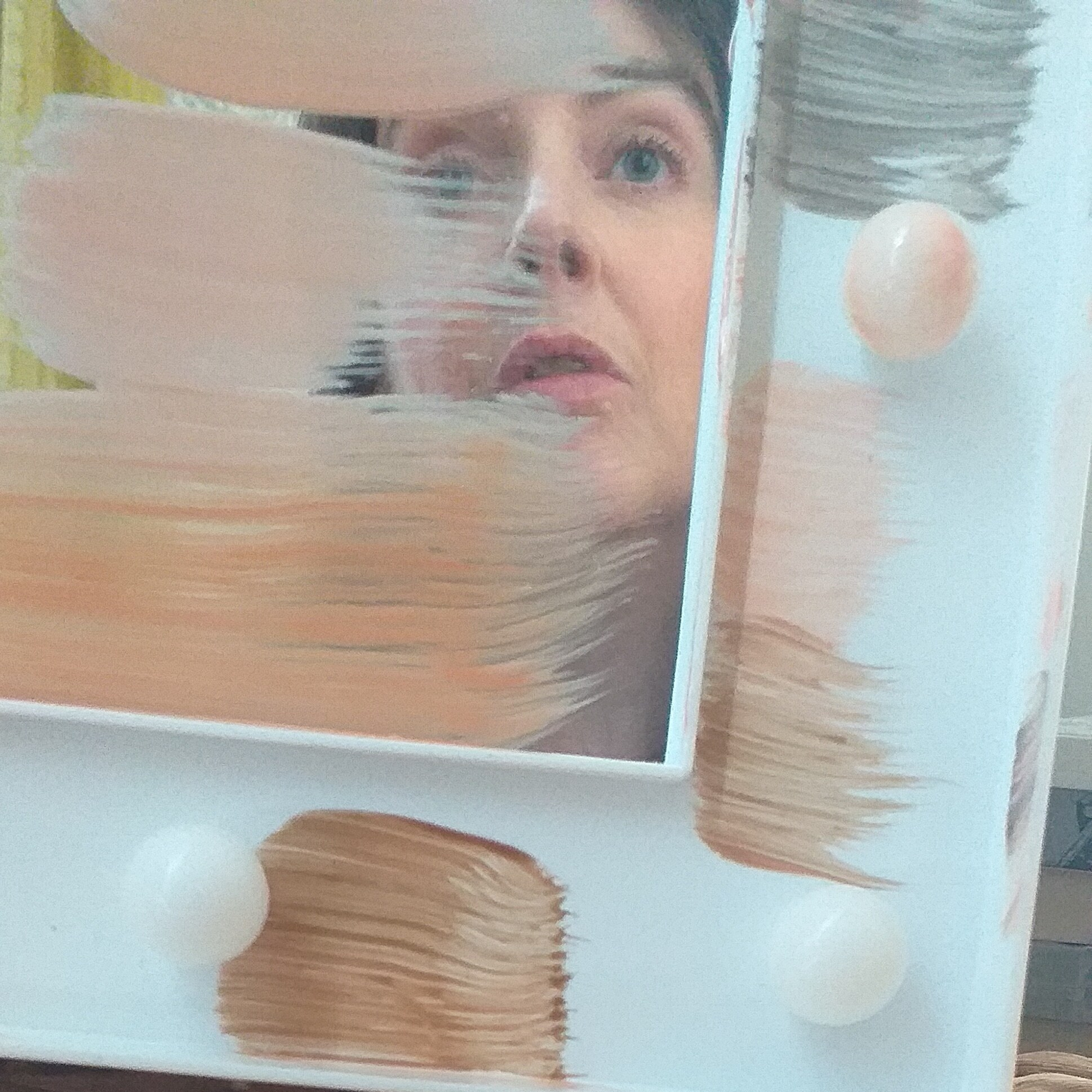
- Born: 1972 (age 53–54); Alexandria, Dunbartonshire
- Education: BFA in sculpture (1999); MPhil in art in organisational contexts (2000); MFA in fine arts (2004), all from Glasgow School of Art.
- Occupation: Scottish sculptor

Karla Black (born 1972) is a Scottish sculptor. She creates abstract, three-dimensional artworks that explore the physicality of materials as a way of understanding and communicating the world around us.

In 2011, Black was nominated for the Turner Prize and also represented Scotland at the Venice Biennale. Her work has been the subject of solo exhibitions at the Kestnergesellschaft in Hanover, Germany; the Institute of Contemporary Art in Philadelphia; the Gemeentemuseum, The Hague; the Dallas Museum of Art; and the Gallery of Modern Art, Glasgow, Modern Art Oxford and Kunsthalle Nurnberg, Germany. Black represented Scotland at the 54th Venice Biennale in 2011.

== Early life and education ==
Black was born 1972 in Alexandria, Dunbartonshire, and studied Sculpture at The Glasgow School of Art from 1995 to 1999. From there, Black gained an MPhil in Art in Organisational Contexts from the year 1999 to 2000, as well as an MFA in fine arts from 2002 to 2004.

== Artistic style ==
Black uses mostly traditional art-making materials such as plaster, paint, paper and chalk in her work, along with a small amount of substances such as cosmetics and toiletries. Her sculptures are either 'almost' or 'only just' objects and skirt the mediums of sculpture, painting, performance art and installation, often juxtaposing large scale with a fragility of form.

She utilises and plays with the physical properties of a wide array of materials, which she seeks to use in an aesthetically pleasing, yet raw and unformed way. Although Black identifies as a sculptor, her use of everyday matter mixed with traditional art materials works to expand the parameters of sculpture. According to Black, her works exist and operate as "almost painting, almost installation, almost performance art."

Black cites the influence of psychoanalytical theory on her work: she has a particular interest in the writings of Melanie Klein (1882–1960) who pioneered early developments in child psychology. Black has said: "The sculptures are rooted in Psychoanalysis and Feminism; in theories about the violent and sexual underpinnings of both individual mental mess, as in neuroses and psychosis, and the formlessness of specific points in art history, i.e. German and Abstract Expressionism, Viennese Actionism, Land Art, Anti-form and Feminist Performance."

In one of Black's pieces entitled "Made to Wait" (2009), a cellophane sheet is seen floating as an invisible screen with a band of paint and other cosmetic products smeared over it, covering its lower half. According to the Guggenheim, this piece is "elusive and stable" while "the work is grounded in its materiality as a physical experience and resists any metaphorical or symbolic meaning."

Blacks work is in the collections of the Arts Council Collection London, the Dallas Museum of Art, the David Roberts Art Foundation, the Rhode Island School of Design Museum, the Scottish National Gallery of Modern Art, the Solomon R. Guggenheim Museum, the Southbank Centre, and the Tate.

== Publications ==
- Karla Black (2010), Karla Black: It's Proof That Counts, JRP/Ringier, ISBN 978-3-03764-084-5
- Karla Black: ten sculptures, Kunsthalle Nürnberg, 2010.
- Briony Fer, Karla Black – Brains Are Really Everything, Scotland + Venice 2011, 4 June – 27 November 2011, The Fruitmarket Gallery, Edinburgh
- Susanne Figner and Barry Schwabsky, Karla Black, Walther Konig, Koln, 2014.
- Kate Kraczon, Karla Black: Practically in Shadow, Institute of Contemporary Art, University of Pennsylvania, 2015.
- Karla Black & Kishio Suga: A New Order, National Galleries of Scotland, Edinburgh, 2017.
