= Eric Hattan =

Swiss artist (born 1955)

Eric Hattan (born 1955) is a Swiss visual artist and educator. He is primarily known as a conceptual artist, video artist, performance artist and installation artist. Hattan lives and works in Basel and Paris.

== Biography ==
Eric Hattan was born on 1955 in Wettingen, Baden District, Aargau, Switzerland.

His first solo exhibition was in 1981 in St. Gallen. In the 1990s, he sometimes exhibited alongside artist Silvia Bächli, whom he married. He later collaborated in exhibitions with artist Werner Reiterer.

== Artwork ==
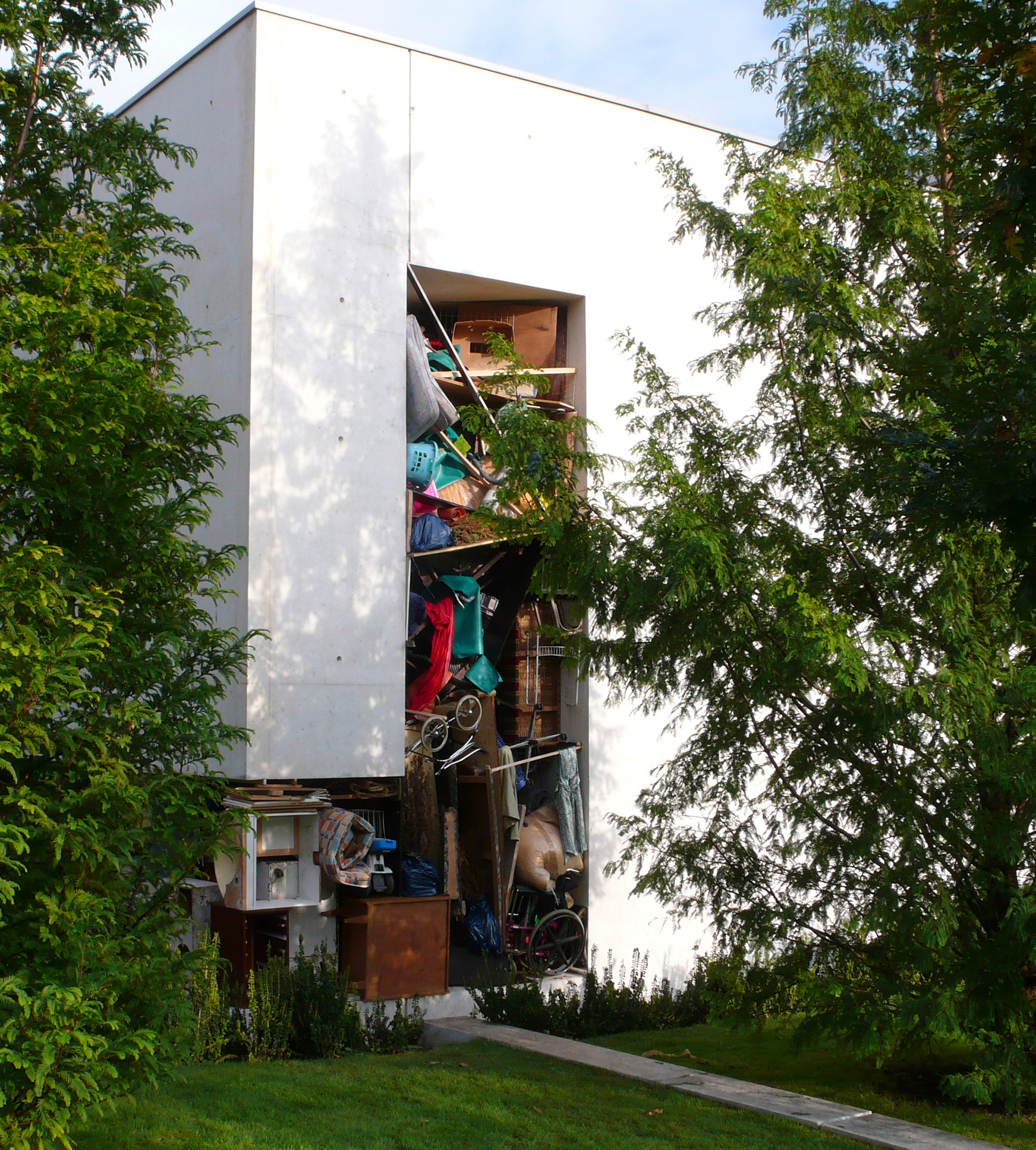
Temporary installation, realized September 27/28/29 2010 by Eric Hattan, MAC/VAL, Vitry-sur-Seine

Hattan departs from concrete objects and spaces. He questions places, architectures and situations of all-day-life through breaking regularities and subverting the assumed stasis of the world with playful irony. The rearrangement of clothing, furniture, pedestals or monitors plays a decisive role in his oeuvre, even became independent and exposes given situations to unbiased observation. Hattan directs his gaze on processes and incidents in the urban space through his video camera. During expeditions through cities and their peripheries he discovers a potential of plastic forms, which complete, comment or permeate his installative works since the 1990s. The phenomenological exploration of daily processes and random movements leads him often to construction sites. Not yet or not anymore used zones, property just before demolition or during a building freeze, waste land and nowhere land, lay bare sculptural qualities, which challenge the artist to different insights. Hattan's usually temporary projects in public space are evidence of an interest in inverting the view on the familiar.

Hattan's artistic career developed parallel to his early engagement for a young scene of artists, with whom he realized many exhibitions and performances in the self-organized Basel project space Filiale during the 1980s and 1990s.

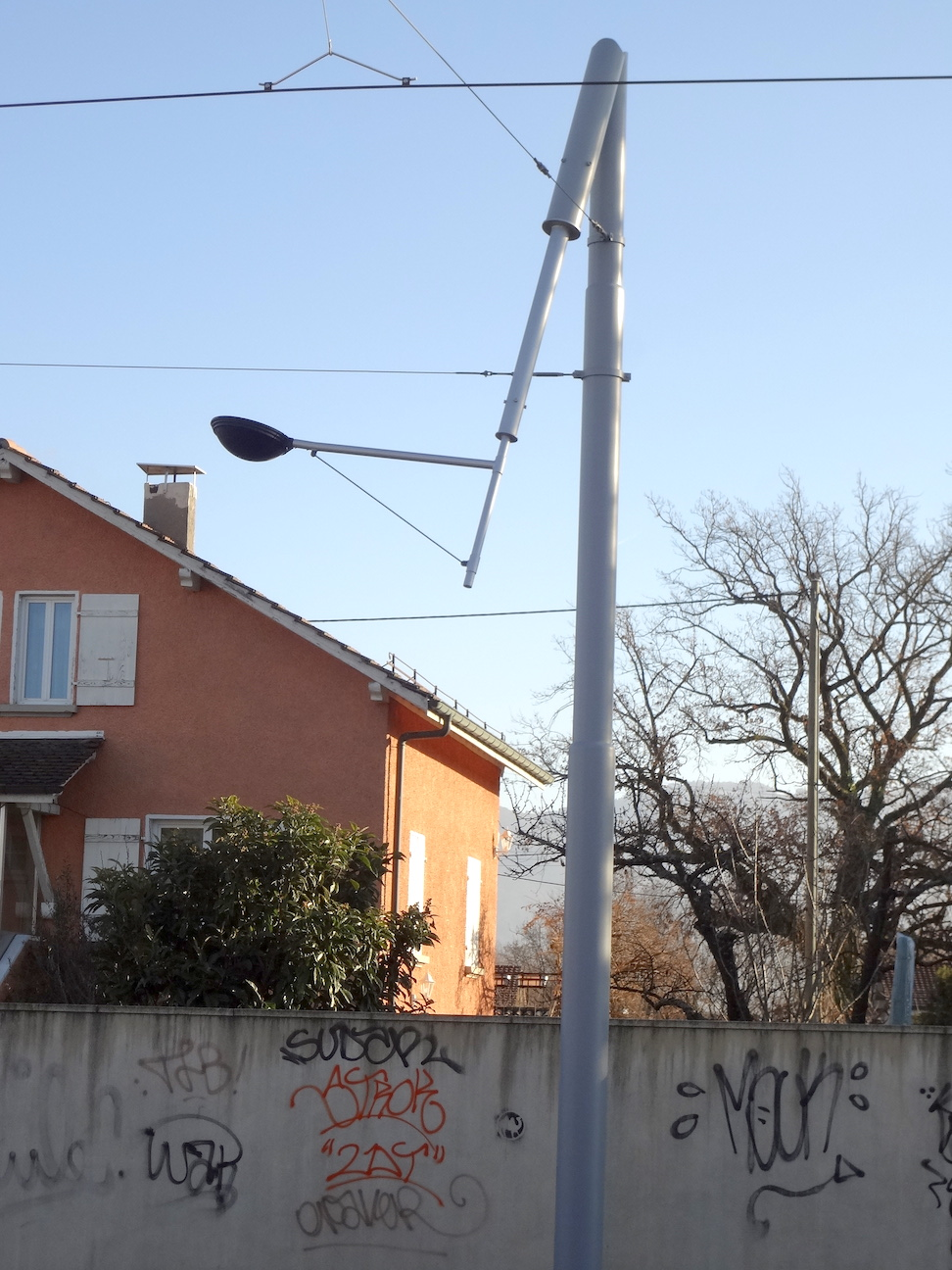
Les jeux sont faits..., Geneva, 2014.

== Exhibitions ==
=== Solo exhibitions ===
- 2000/01: Beton liquide, Aargauer Kunsthaus, Aarau / MAMCO musée d'art moderne et contemporain, Genève
- 2003: Kennen sie DIE?, with Werner Reiterer, Kunsthaus Baselland Muttenz near Basel; Liquid concrete, Swiss Institute Contemporary Art New York
- 2004: Kunstverein Bremerhaven
- 2005: Echelle, Echec et Réverb, Musée d'art moderne et contemporain, Strasbourg; Vous êtes chez moi, FRAC Alsace, Sélestat
- 2007: Eintagsfliegen, Kunstvereinsheim, Kasseler Kunstverein, Kassel; Eric Hattan, Skopia Art Contemporain, Genève
- 2008: S cul türe Physique, Gallery Hervé Bize, Nancy
- 2009: Carte blanche, MAC/VAL, Val-de-Marne, Vitry-sur-Seine
- 2010: Hinkel, MAP / The Chain, Düsseldorf
- 2011: Schnee bis im Mai with Silvia Bächli, Kunsthalle Nürnberg
- 2012: Handarbeit, Gallery Weingrüll, Karlsruhe
- 2013: What About Sunday? with Silvia Bächli, MK Gallery, Milton Keynes
- 2014: Solo Exhibition at FRAC Provence-Alpes-Côte d'Azur, Marseille

=== Group exhibitions ===
- 2002: in capital letters, Kunsthalle Basel, Basel; Art Unlimited, Art 33, Basel
- 2004: situations construites, 10 ans d'attitudes, Attitudes, Genève; So wie die Dinge liegen, Phoenix Halle, Dortmund
- 2005/06: Reprocessing Reality, Château de Nyon and MoMA PS1 Contemporary Art Center, New York
- 2007: In Situ, Le Quartier, Centre d'art Contemporain, Quimper
- 2008: Les Ateliers de Rennes, Biennale d'Art contemporain, Rennes; Le printemps de septembre, Espace Beaux-Arts, Toulouse
- 2010: Art Public, Art 41, Basel
- 2011: The Beirut Experience I, Beirut Art Center
- 2012: Nouvelles boîtes!, Kunstmuseum Luzern
- 2013: Les Pleiades 30 ans des FRAC, FRAC Midi-Pyrénées à Toulouse

== Publications ==
- Beton liquide: Eric Hattan - Video, ed. by Aargauer Kunsthaus Aarau and Lars Müller Publishers, Red. Stephan Kunz, incl. a text by Kathrin Becker (ger./fr./engl.), Baden: Lars Müller, 2000. ISBN 3-907078-29-2
- Ideeavoir: Eric Hattan, ed. by Sabine Schaschl-Cooper, Muttenz/Basel: Kunsthaus Baselland, 2003. ISBN 3-906539-12-1
- Eric Hattan: Niemand ist mehr da - Vous êtes chez moi, incl. a text by Maja Naef and Ralph Ubl (ger./fr./engl.) and a DVD, Berlin: Holzwarth Publications, 2006. ISBN 978-3-935567-32-9
- Silvia Bächli, Eric Hattan: Schnee bis im Mai, ed. by Kunsthalle Nürnberg, with texts by Raphaële Jeune, Michael Semff and Harriet Zilch (ger./engl.), Köln: Snoeck, 2011. ISBN 978-3-940953-77-3
