= Hayward Gallery =

Art gallery in London, England

Coordinates: 51°30′22″N 0°6′56″W

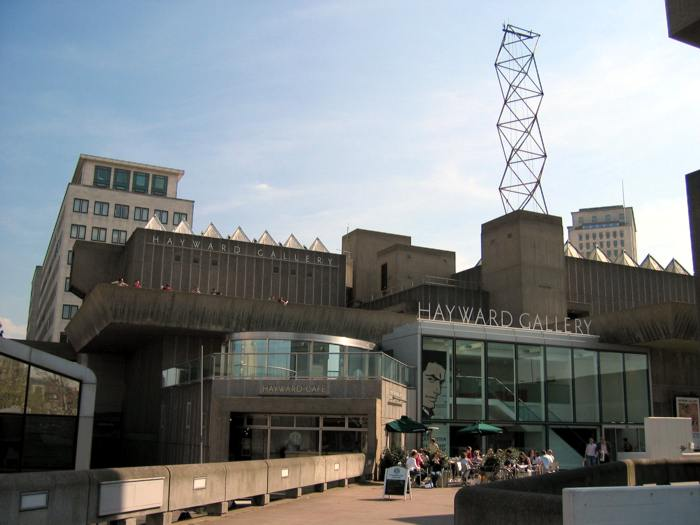

General information
- Type: Gallery
- Architectural style: Brutalist
- Location: London, SE1, United Kingdom
- Opened: 9 July 1968; 58 years ago

Design and construction
- Architects: Norman Engleback; Ron Herron, Warren Chalk and John Attenborough
- Structural engineer: Ove Arup & Partners
- Main contractor: Higgs and Hill

The Hayward Gallery is an art gallery within the Southbank Centre in central London, England and part of an area of major arts venues on the South Bank of the River Thames. It is sited adjacent to the other Southbank Centre buildings (the Royal Festival Hall and the Queen Elizabeth Hall/Purcell Room) and also the National Theatre and BFI Southbank repertory cinema. Following a rebranding of the South Bank Centre to Southbank Centre in early 2007, the Hayward Gallery was known as the Hayward until early 2011.

== Description ==
The Hayward Gallery was built by Higgs and Hill and opened on 9 July 1968. Its massing and extensive use of exposed concrete construction are features typical of Brutalist architecture. The initial concept was designed, with the Queen Elizabeth Hall and Purcell Room, as an addition to the Southbank Centre arts complex by team leader Norman Engleback, assisted by John Attenborough, Ron Herron and Warren Chalk, two members of the later founded group Archigram, of the Department of Architecture and Civic Design of the Greater London Council. Warren Chalk then developed the site plan and connective first floor walkways, while Ron Herron worked on the acoustics for the Queen Elizabeth Hall. Alan Waterhouse, then Dennis Crompton, worked on the designs for the Hayward. The building is named after Sir Isaac Hayward, a former leader of the London County Council, the GLC's predecessor..Joanna Drew was the founding director; Ralph Rugoff served as director from 2006 until 2026, when he was succeeded by Sally Tallant.

== Exhibitions ==
The Hayward does not house a permanent collection. Instead, it hosts three or four major temporary exhibitions of modern or contemporary artworks each year. From 1968 to 1986, the gallery was managed by the Arts Council of Great Britain, but management of the gallery then passed to Southbank Centre. The gallery is also the base of Arts Council England's National Touring Exhibitions programme, as it was, until 2002, of the Arts Council Collection. Unlike British galleries with permanent collections who receive local or central government funding, but in common with other temporary exhibitions at the London public galleries, the Hayward charges admission fees. The Hayward's exhibition policy embraces visual art from all periods: past shows having included the works of Leonardo da Vinci to Edvard Munch and beyond. The programme, however, has tended to concentrate on surveys of contemporary art which complement the spaces and powerful concrete structure of the building, such as those of works by Dan Flavin and Antony Gormley.

It has hosted two surveys of works from the Arts Council Collection: British Art 1940–1980 and How to Improve the World: 60 Years of British Art.

== Architecture ==
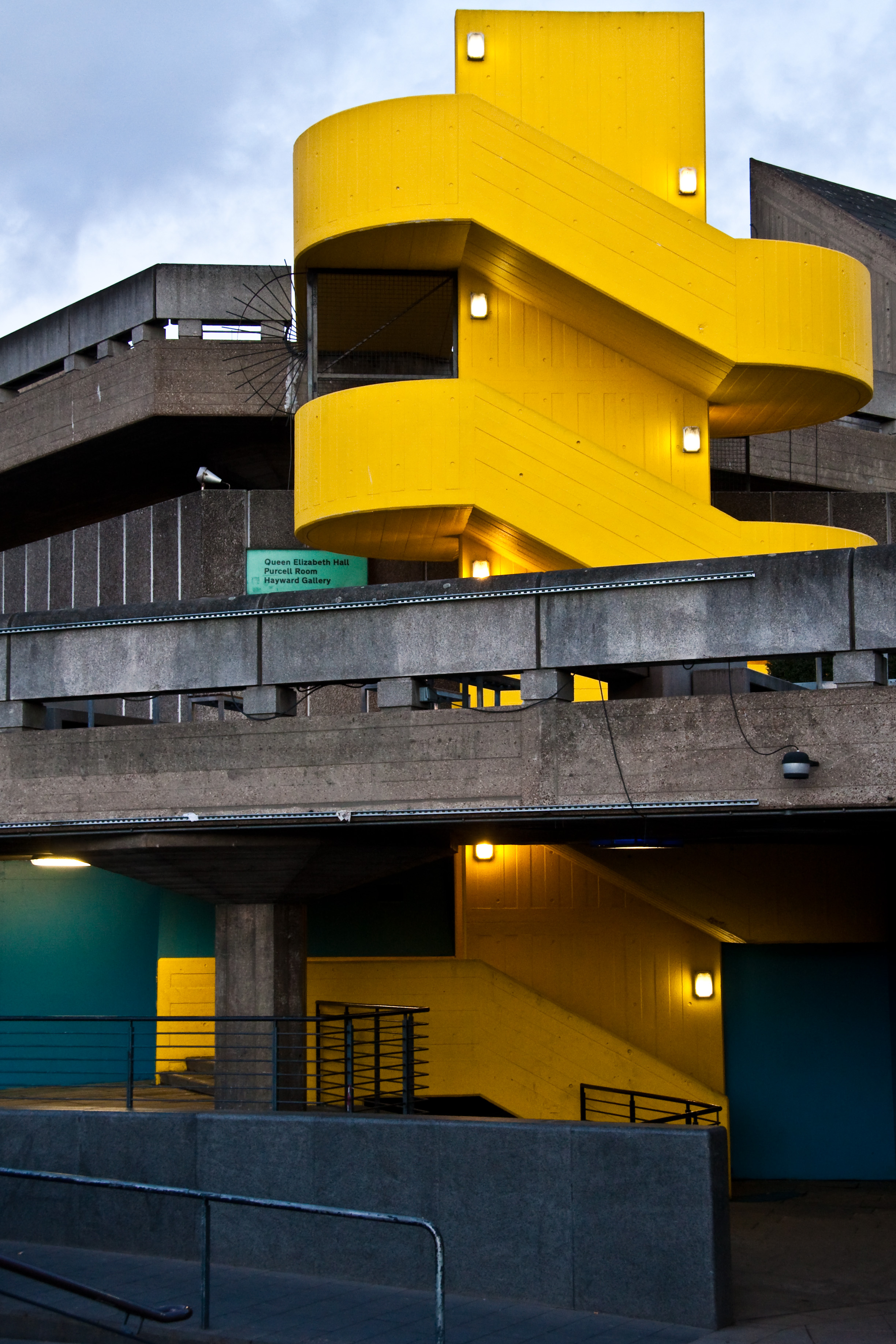
Key staircase by the Queens Walk between ground, walkway and Queen Elizabeth Hall roof terrace levels.

The design brief was for five gallery spaces, two levels of indoor galleries and three outdoor sculpture courts (the massive concrete trays at the upper level) in order to house the Arts Council collection. The intended outdoor display of sculpture against the background of the London skyline appears to have been impractical and the sculpture courts have been little used and usually closed to the public until the Blind Light exhibition of works by Antony Gormley in 2007.

The two levels of the gallery open to the public are linked by a pair of cast concrete staircases. These staircases, and lavatories at an intermediate level, are accommodated in a concrete box in between the eastern and western parts of the indoor galleries. One of these staircases also runs down to street level with access (now emergency only) to Belvedere Road; the other extends down into the private entrance foyer, at lower level, on the north side of the building. This almost hidden private entrance is located below the foyer and external walkway on the north facade, above the car park and near the overhanging Purcell Room auditorium. Screens formerly advertised the National Film Theatre (the BFI Southbank from 2007) and Museum of the Moving Image enclosed the car park by the central access road. They were removed in 2008 giving a more open feel to the ground level area at the western end.

The building originally had a very small main foyer area with cast aluminium doors similar to those of the Queen Elizabeth Hall. In 2003, the foyer of the building was remodelled with a larger glass-fronted foyer, designed by the Haworth Tompkins architectural practice, and including a new oval shaped glass pavilion designed by Dan Graham above a new cafe in the projecting former office space at the east end. A shop had been added earlier inside the north-west end of the lower gallery.

The two upper galleries can use heavily filtered natural light from the glass pyramids on their flat roofs. Three concrete towers run vertically through the middle of the structure and contain the passenger lift, service lift and service duct. Between 1972 and 2008 a kinetic light sculpture, which responds to wind force, stood on the roof of the passenger lift tower. This famous London landmark was designed and built by Philip Vaughan and Roger Dainton as a way to attract visitors to the gallery. It was removed in order for renovation to take place which involved replacing the original neon lighting with LEDs, but subsequently it was decided not to reinstall it.

The roof terrace at the south end and linking bridge to the Queen Elizabeth Hall foyer building is closed to the public, which makes impossible some of the more interesting pedestrian circulation opportunities of the original design, although these were opened for the Summer of Fun festival in 2011.

The walkway above Belvedere Road with access from Waterloo Bridge widens to the west, following the line of Belvedere Road and accommodating the stairs to the external terrace, but following a different line from the upper gallery walls. The angled plan shape of the concrete sculpture court in the south corner reflects the change in angle of the site between Waterloo Bridge and Festival Square. In this way, despite its seemingly uncompromising form, the building responds to its site.

The south-west corner of the building at street level is occupied by an electrical switch room. A car park occupies most of the lower ground level. A plant room occupies the lower level at the east end, above the car park, with a great concrete exhaust stack by Waterloo Bridge.

The high-level walkway system which linked the Hayward to the Hungerford Bridge area was partly removed in spring 1999, leaving a curious truncated end on Festival Square, and poorer access from Festival Square. This is exacerbated by the positioning of the car park and loading bay entrances, a legacy of the original 1960's design ideas about vertical separation of pedestrian and vehicle traffic. Among the tricks of the building is the different lines of the walls at ground level and walkway level on this facade, which reconcile the differing axes of the Hayward and the Royal Festival Hall.

In 2011, the Hayward Gallery was added to the protected list of the World Monuments Fund. In 2026, the gallery, along with the Queen Elizabeth Hall and Purcell Room, were Grade II listed.

The gallery was temporarily closed in September 2015, for two years of renovations and re-opened in early 2018.

== Recent developments ==
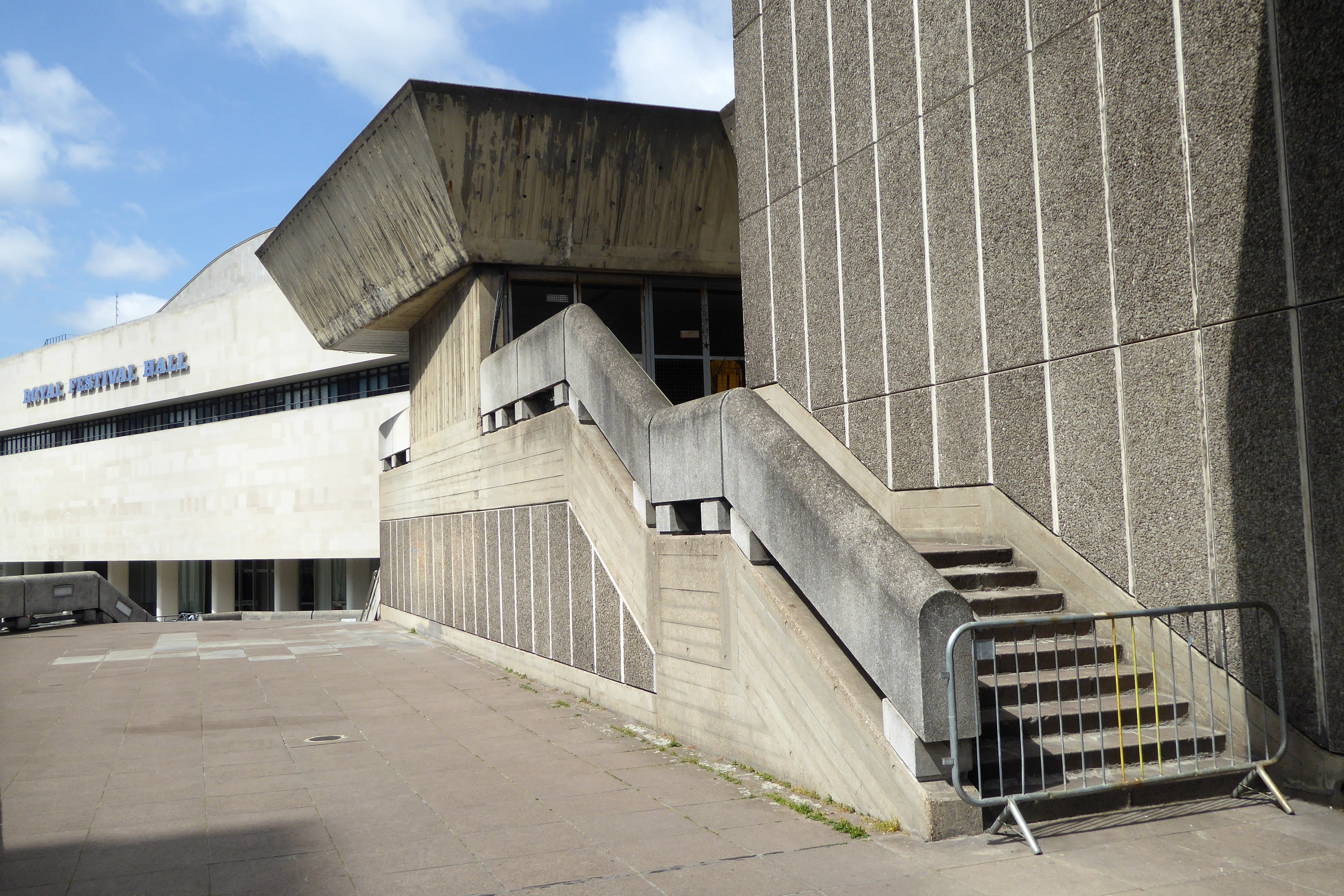
Staircase on the southern side of the gallery

Southbank Centre and Arts Council considered the future of the Hayward building, together with the Queen Elizabeth Hall and Purcell Room which stand between the Hayward and the River Thames over several years. A proposed scheme selected from an architectural competition, designed by Richard Rogers, in the early 1990s would have involved covering all three buildings in a great wave-shaped glass roof, which would have linked the Royal Festival Hall to Waterloo Bridge. This did not proceed due to its reliance on a high level of lottery funding, likely high cost, and the opposition of the Twentieth Century Society who saw it as damaging to the setting of the individual buildings underneath the canopy.

Refurbishment work was carried out in 2015–18 under plans developed by Feilden Clegg Bradley. Included in this work were structural repairs such as the renewal of the 60 odd steel and glass pyramids which grace the roof of the gallery and removal of a false ceiling which obstructed natural light reaching the upper galleries.
