= Mike Stubbs =

British artist and curator

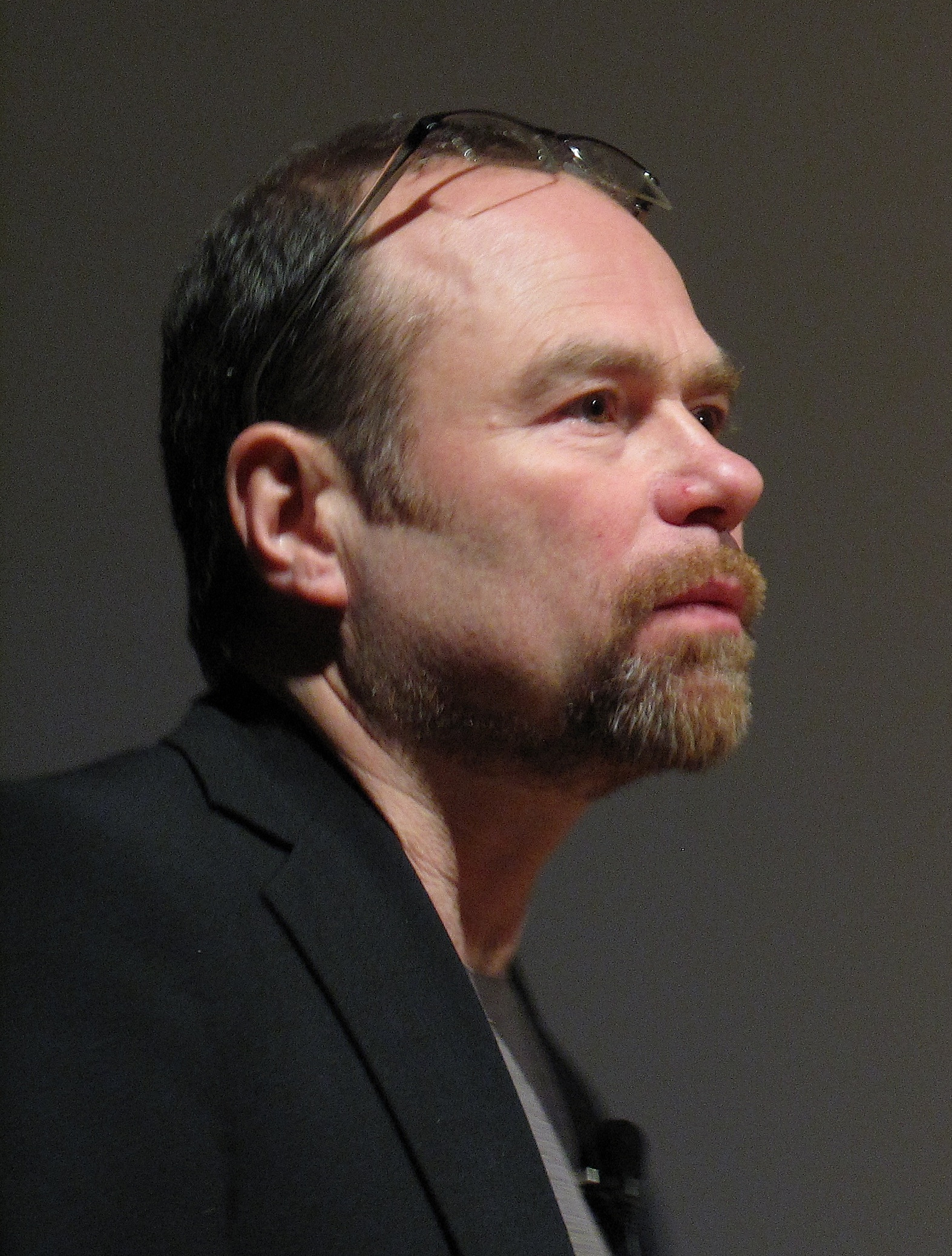
Stubbs in 2009

Mike Stubbs is a curator/director and filmmaker based in the UK, currently, the Creative Producer at Doncaster Creates. For 11 years he was the Director/CEO of FACT, the Foundation for Art and Creative Technology, a leading arts organisation for the commissioning and presentation of new media art forms. He has been a key contributor to the development of culture and cultural policy in Liverpool, UK. Stubbs was jointly appointed in May 2007 by Liverpool John Moores University, where he is Professor of Art, Media and Curating. He is father to two daughters Saskia and Lola Czarnecki-stubbs.

== Curator/director and filmmaker ==
Previously he was Head of Exhibition Programs for the Australian Centre for the Moving Image, Senior Research Fellow at Duncan of Jordanstone College of Art and Design Visual Research Centre (The University of Dundee) and founding Director at Hull Time Based Arts (HTBA).

As a cofounder of ROOT, Burning Bush Bush and the Abandon Normal Devices festivals, a project of FACT and Cornerhouse Stubbs has commissioned and produced over 350 exhibitions, interactive, site specific, performative, sound and moving-image based exhibition programmes and artworks. These include White Noise, Stanley Kubrick and Pixar for ACMI, Sk-Interfaces and Pipilotti Rist for FACT's Capital of Culture 2008 programme. Stubbs is part of curatorium for the Liverpool Biennial.

Stubbs has won awards for his work in the arts and moving image. His work encompasses film, video, mixed media installations and performance. He has won more than a dozen major international awards including first prizes at the Oberhausen and Locarno film festivals and an award for his documentary, Cultural Quarter at the Copenhagen International Documentary Festival. In 1999 he was invited to present a video retrospective of his work at the Tate Gallery, London.

Stubbs was on the board of Culture Campus and held the post of Chair for ReWire, the Fourth International Conference on the Histories of Media Art, Science and Technology. 28 – 30 September 2011 and Liverpool's Ropewalks Stakeholder Group.

== Exhibitions ==
2021 Climate Emergency Services, mobile public artwork, commissioned for Folkestone Triennial

2019/2021 Escaping Gravity Airship Dreams – Imperial Airship Dreams, Bedford Creative Arts, Bedford.

2019 – Next Art Tainan exhibition, Absolute Space for the Arts, Tainan.

2006 – Burnt exhibition, Experimental Arts Foundation, Adelaide. – Cultural Quarter installation, SCAPE Biennale of Public Art, Christchurch, New Zealand

2005 – Fuel exhibition, Creative Industries Precinct, The Block, Brisbane.

2004 – City Strapline Industries exhibition, Baltic Art Centre, Newcastle.

2003 – Jump Jet Peterborough Museum and Art Gallery commissioned by Peterborough Digital Arts. Large scale outdoor projection and twin screen gallery installation. Made on location at RAF Wittering. – Cultural Quarter short video commissioned by Forma, shown at transmediale, Berlin, Adelaide International Film Festival, Next Five Minutes Festival, Amsterdam and winner of Jury prize at Echigo Tsumari Trienalle, Japan, Hamburg Short Film Festival and Videoex Experimental Film Festival, Switzerland. – Speechless outdoor projection, streaming media website commissioned by Hull Time Based Arts. Incorporating Mother Nature short video shown at Cambridge Film Festival and Werklietz Bienalle.

2002 – Doughnut YOTA commission Eastern Arts Board/Bedford Community Arts, multi screen DVD/video installation on car culture, with sound by Scanner. Also short film for Channel 4 Slot Art series. Presented at Moving Image Centre, Auckland, New Zealand and CCA, Glasgow, Ferens Art Gallery Hull as part of ROOT Festival and Cornerhouse Gallery, Manchester.

2001

- Zero short film with text by Netotchka Nezvanova and Kevin Henderson in collaboration with Gina Czarnecki. Filmed in Zero Gravity as part of a research trip organised by The Arts Catalyst, Commissioned by PVA for SWIPE Festival.

2000 – River 'Brilliant' multi screen DVD installation commission for Culture Company, HTBA and City Screen, York, '00 and The Moving Image Centre, Auckland New Zealand. – Sweatlodge Artists film projections, Tate Modern, Turbine hall wall. – Resistor dance for camera in collaboration with Voortman de Jonge Dance Company for BBC2/ACE – Gillian Wearing Things collaboration with Gillian Dyson – performance documentation

1999 – Video retrospective Tate Gallery, London & Albany Centre Art Gallery, New York – Voxpops collaboration with Scanner in development for FACT – Youth Action short video produced for Art in the Open, QuayArts – Burnt Island Low budget feature film in collaboration with Roland Denning for Yorkshire Media Production Agency

1998 – Agency For Unwanted Information Performance & social research, St Veit, Vergessen Festival – Identikit website intervention, digital circus, Lovebytes, Sheffield

1997 – Little England short video produced in Yorkshire – Gift transmitted BBC 2, 14 January.

1996 – Directed Gift a collaboration with composer Ulf Langheinrich for BBC2 and The Arts Council's Sound on Film TV series. – Word Up transmitted on ORF TV.

1995 – Conceived and co-produced We Want God Now collaboration between Man Act and Granular Synthesis. Multi-media dance installation stage show, Junction Art Centre, Cambridge. – Directed Man Act a short film in collaboration with Man Act for BBC2 and The Arts Council's Dance to Camera TV series.

1994 – Directed, Homing a 35mm film commissioned by the British Film Institute and Yorkshire and Humberside Arts Board, recently premiered at the London Film Festival. Also shown at Rai congress centre, Amsterdam. Offlined on AVID. – Truth Wars performance in collaboration Nina Edge, at Princes Quay Shopping Centre as part of Humberside Youth Arts Day, Hull. – Co-producer MODEL 5 by Granular Synthesis, Vienna for ROOT 95, ICA London and Osnabrück Media Art Festival.

1993 – Ice Cream collaboration with Bisakha Sarker – a dance video installation project presented at Leicestershire Museum and Art Gallery as part of YEAR OF DANCE. – The Lakes of the Eyes short video commissioned by Sanchari dance company, premiered at Merseyside's Visionfest. – Video installation Bedtime Stories, re-presented at Mediawave, Gyor, Hungary. – Performance projection What the Eye Doesn't See – Studies in Post Industrial Studies No 1 – Transport, North Woolwich train Station and Railway Museum in collaboration with Rob Gawthrop, presented as part of River Crossings commissioned by Camerawork. Film also shown at Bela Balzac Studios, Budapest. – Prontawipe performed at the Royal Festival Hall as a part of Quick weekend of Live Art. – Sweatlodge purchased by Canadian, Australian and Belgian television companies. Printed onto 35mm film. Invited presentations at Short Film, (Oberhausen,) Viper (Lucern), Exposure (Montreal) and Impakt (Utrecht) and British Short Film Festivals.

1992 – Pants Make Spam Commission, performance video for Arnolfini, Bristol. Premiered London Film Festival. – Bedtime Stories exhibited at Northern Centre For Contemporary Art, Sunderland and Ferens Art Gallery, Hull. – False Pretences revived and performed at Centre for Performing Arts, Holborn and Prema Art Centre, Dursley. – Prontawipe re-commissioned by Eastern Arts for Junction Arts Centre, Cambridge. – Video tape Sweatlodge invited to Berlin, Worldwide (The Hague) and Mediawave (Gyor, Hungary) festivals. Purchased by S.B.S., Australian T.V. Wins Golden Artronic at Locarno Video Art Festival. Included in ICA Video Biennale.

1991 – Installation Pronta Wipe commissioned by Projects U.K. for shop in Grainger Street, Newcastle, in collaboration with Nina Edge. – Video installation Bedtime Stories: Highlights from the Gulf War commissioned and exhibited by Manchester City Art Gallery. – Video installation Here Comes Another Jelly Rabbit in collaboration with Dick Powell exhibited at Ferens Art Gallery, Hull, as part of show Is Modern Life Rubbish? – Video tape Sweatlodge commissioned by Man Act, of performance work of the same name for Glasgow City of Culture 1990 at the Tramway, Glasgow. Shown at London and Edinburgh Film Festivals.

1990 – Video installation Theme Shopping Park commissioned by Moviola for North Face exhibition at Bluecoat Gallery, Liverpool.

1989 – Video installation/workshop Brick Veneer at Fremantle Institute of Film & Television, Western Australia. – Video installation Desert Island Dread commissioned by Video Positive festival, Liverpool. – Performance Things I’ve Seen at Humberside Polytechnic Events Week.

1988 – Video installation Myths of Speed commissioned by Chapter Arts Centre, Cardiff and also shown at Watermans Art Centre, London and Usher Gallery, Lincoln. – Things I’ve Seen commissioned by National Video 8 Fest, Brighton. – Lighting/camera on Medusa videotape, directed by Katherine Meynell for B.F.I./Channel 4. – Co-Producer for The Blue Line video documentation of Fran Cottell's performance festival.

1987 – Exhibited Fragility of Things sculptural installation at the Ferens Art Gallery, Hull. – Performance Fragility of Things Ferens Art Gallery, Hull. – Invited to show video Man Act at Berlin Film Festival.

1986 – Produced and directed Soapless – 50 min., 16mm black humor soap around the work ethic, funded by the Welsh Arts Council. – Anti-apartheid video Greetings From the Cape of Good Hope? Commissioned by Anti Apartheid. Transmitted by Ex-Nihlio on French Television.

1985 Co-directed/filmed Pigeons, with Clare Pollak documentary commissioned by S4C Television.

1984 – 16mm drama film Contortions awarded 1st prize: Independent, at the Celtic Film Fest and broadcast by the B.B.C. – Produced video tapes for The New Arts Consort mixed media show Punishment by Roses, presented at Edinburgh Fringe Festival, Chapter Art Centre and Battersea Arts Centre, London. – Produced video installation Fun House for Chapter Art Centre & The Mickery, Amsterdam.

1984 – Invited to present Contortions at 2nd Festival Internazionale Cinema Giovani, in Turin, Italy and Festival de Cinema Minorities, Douarnenez, France.

1983 – Produced and toured video performance False Pretences including the I.C.A. London and the Basement, Newcastle. – Commissioned by Z.G. magazine to produce and direct documentary on New York artists Robert Longo, Cindy Sherwin, David Salle, Jack Goldstein and Richard Prince. – Three one-minute fake adverts RA screened on Swedish television.

1982 – Produced and directed Contortions funded by the Welsh Arts Council. – Commissioned by Chapter Arts Centre, Cardiff to produce theatre show Hero of the Hour at Chapter Theatre. (Starless Cast)

== Programming and curation ==
2018 STRATA. Estratos – Rocas – Polvo – Estrellas, Municipality of Panama, Curator

2018 Strata – Rock – Dust – Stars, York Art Gallery, Curator

2010 Liverpool Biennial, Curator

2009 AND Festival, Co-curator, Cultural Olympiad in the North West Region

2008 Curator Liverpool Biennial, European Capital of Culture, Synthetic Times, Olympic Program, Beijing

2007 Pixar, Producer

2006 Eyes Lies and Illusions, Co-curator, Producer

2006 TV50 – Fifty Years of Television in Australia, Producer

2006 Contemporary Commonwealth, Co-curator/Producer

2005 Stanley Kubrick – Inside the Mind of a Visionary Film Maker, Producer

2005 White Noise, Curator/Producer

2005 Proof – The Art of Seeing With One's Own Eyes, Curator/Producer

2004 Freefall, Peterborough Museum and Art Gallery, Curator

2004 Itch, Film Program, Adelaide Film Festival

2002 Burning Bush Festival, Fundraiser and Advisor University of Dundee

2001 Dundee Curators Forum, Chair and Co-organiser, DCA, Dundee

2001 Live Art Programme, Curatorial Adviser, Site Gallery, Sheffield

2000 Dundee Contemporary Arts/Cooper Gallery, Initiator and Curator 'Burning Bush', Live Art Programme

2000 Alter Nature, KIMAF, Kiev, Ukraine

2000 Urban Futures International Conference, Johannesburg, curatorial Advisor.

2000 Curator, Seafair, Skopje, CAC, Macedonia

2000 CD ROM Curator, Microwave Festival, Hong Kong

2000 PEACE Exhibition, Hull UK

1998 Hull Time Based: Arts Visual, performance, media art, audio, public art and new technology programmers including ROOT Festival (Running Out of Time)

1998 In Between the Images, Media Programme, Graz

1998 ISEA 98 – Programmed Advisor, Live Art

1998 Chemical – Useful Images – Film and Video programme, 44th International Short Film Festival, Oberhausen

1998 New British Video Medeja, Novi Sad

1996 Cut Up: A history of Found Footage Film and Video – Pandemonium Festival-London Electronic Arts

1994 British Short Films and presented Arrows of Desire program for British Council at the Bauhaus, Dessau, East Germany

1985 Network 1 – Selected 45 contemporary experimental and independent films and videos for a rotating programme of touring to video libraries at the Arnolfini Bristol, Midland Group, Nottingham and Tyneside Cinema, Newcastle

1981 Not Just Another Art Show coordinated mixed media art exhibition in disused supermarket with other graduates from Cardiff Art College
