= Sachiko Abe =

Japanese artist (born 1975)

Sachiko Abe (阿部 幸子, Abe Sachiko; born 1975) is a Japanese contemporary artist. She is best known for her long-duration performance series Cut Papers, in which she cuts paper into fine strips often working for 10 hours a day. Her work has been exhibited internationally, including at the Liverpool Biennial and the museum of modern art (MoMa).

== Early life ==
Abe was born in Japan in 1975. Before pursuing art, she served in Japan Self-Defense Forces, later leaving because, in her words, "the life of artists seemed so free." She has described first discovering the calming effects of cutting paper while admitted to a psychiatric institution, an experience that would come to shape the central concerns of her artistic practice.

Her work since 1997 has explored the regimes of subjectivity imposed by society — an irony not lost on Abe, given that her turn toward art was initially motivated by a desire for freedom.

== Career ==
=== Cut Papers ===
Cut Papers is Abe's signature durational performance series. In it, she sits — often elevated, and dressed in white — and cuts sheets of paper into strips approximately 0.5 mm in width, working for hours at a time. The accumulated strips form large, cascading structures around her: pillars, cones, and feathery drifts of white that have been variously described as resembling snow, cobwebs, or fur.

A notable feature of the performance is the amplification of the cutting sound: Abe's scissors are connected to a speaker, so each cut is audible to the audience, giving the work an insistent, rhythmic quality.

The series has been presented in multiple iterations. Cut Papers #13 was performed at the 18th Biennale of Sydney at Cockatoo Island, and Cut Papers (2010) was commissioned by A Foundation for the Liverpool Biennial, where Abe performed for the duration of the exhibition in a large-scale installation environment.

=== Duration, repetition, and constraint ===
Abe's broader practice is characterised by an emphasis on duration, repetition, and constraint. Her drawing works, produced during intensive residency periods, create dense graphic weaves from sustained mark-making. Critics have approached these works through the framework of philosopher Gilles Deleuze's concept of "the fold."

Abe herself has cautioned against straightforwardly meditative or aesthetic interpretations of her work. She describes it as "an aesthetic paradox" that places the artist at the centre of a field of reciprocal subjectivity: the artist becomes an object of the gaze, which in turn reflects the viewer back to themselves, activating what she calls "a feedback loop." In her own words: "Be warned — my work is neither beautiful nor meditational."
