= Museum Voorlinden =

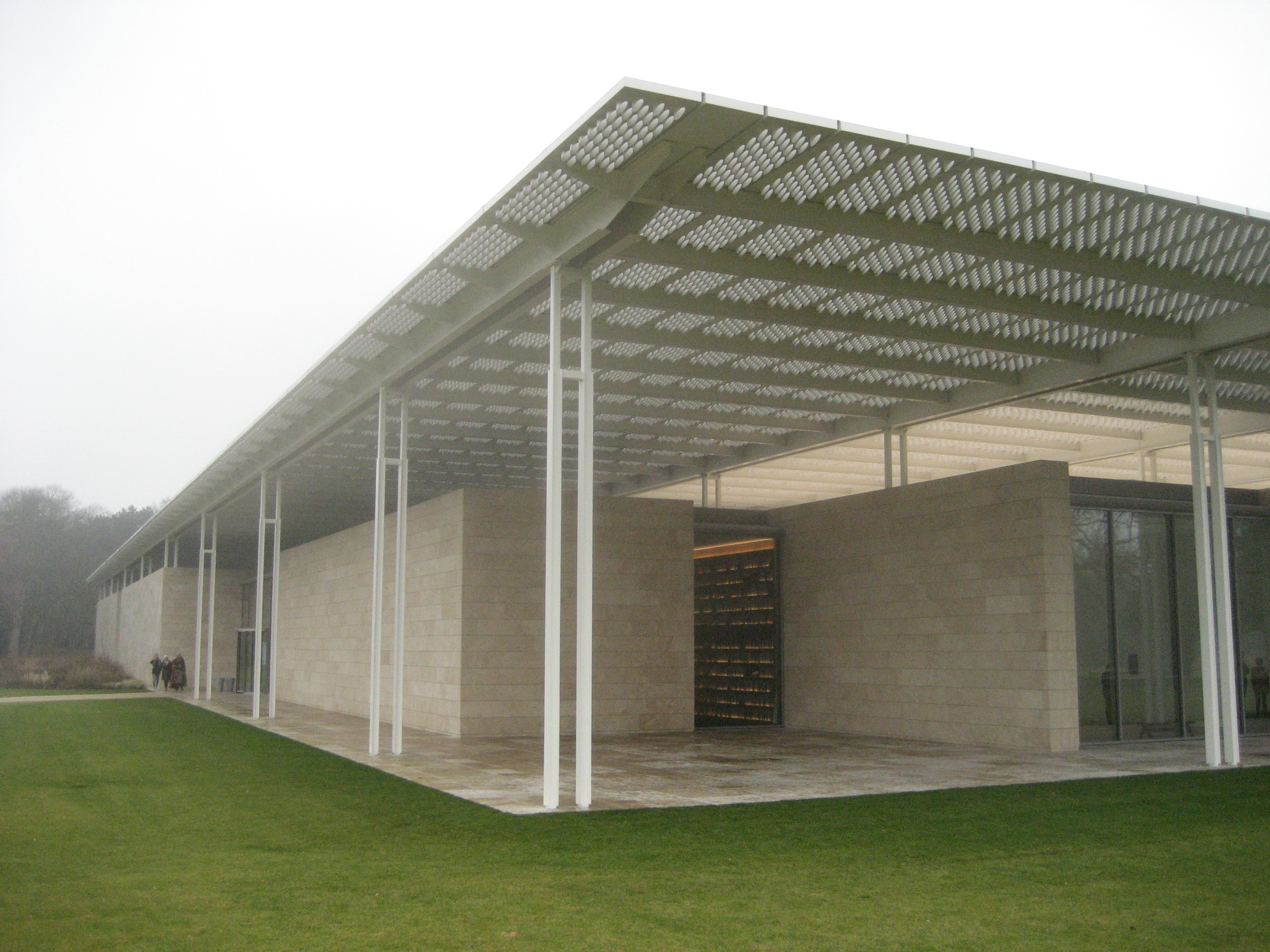
- Museum Voorlinden in 2016

- Location within South Holland
- Established: 10 September 2016
- Location: Buurtweg 90; Wassenaar, Netherlands
- Coordinates: 52°7′7″N 4°20′46″E
- Type: Art museum
- Founder: Joop van Caldenborgh
- Director: Suzanne Swarts
- Owner: Joop van Caldenborgh
- Website: https://www.voorlinden.nl/?lang=en

Museum Voorlinden (Dutch pronunciation: [myˈzeːjʏɱ ˈʋoːrlɪndə(n)]) is an art museum in Wassenaar in the Netherlands. It was founded and is privately owned by Joop van Caldenborgh. It was opened on 10 September 2016 by King Willem-Alexander of the Netherlands. The collection brought together by Joop van Caldenborgh is known as the Caldic Collection, the largest private art collection in the Netherlands. Recent exhibitions include Giuseppe Penone (October 2022 to January 2023), Alex Katz (June to October 2023), Anselm Kiefer (October 2023 to February 2024), Ron Mueck (June to November 2024), Nick Cave (December 2024 to March 2025), the collection presentation I Love New Work based on the titular work of Filip Gilissen (April to September 2025) and Christian Marclay (September to January 2025).

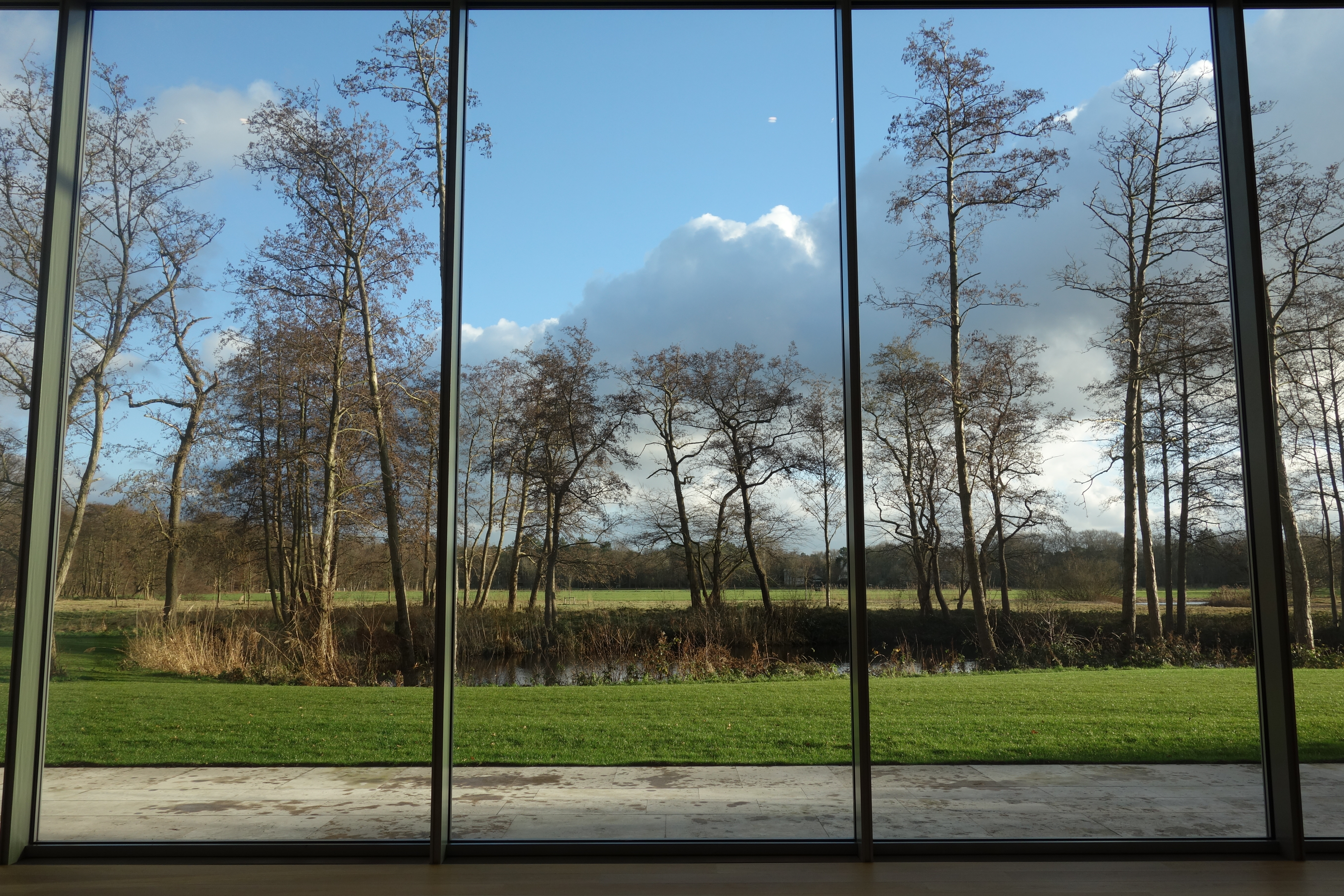
View from the museum

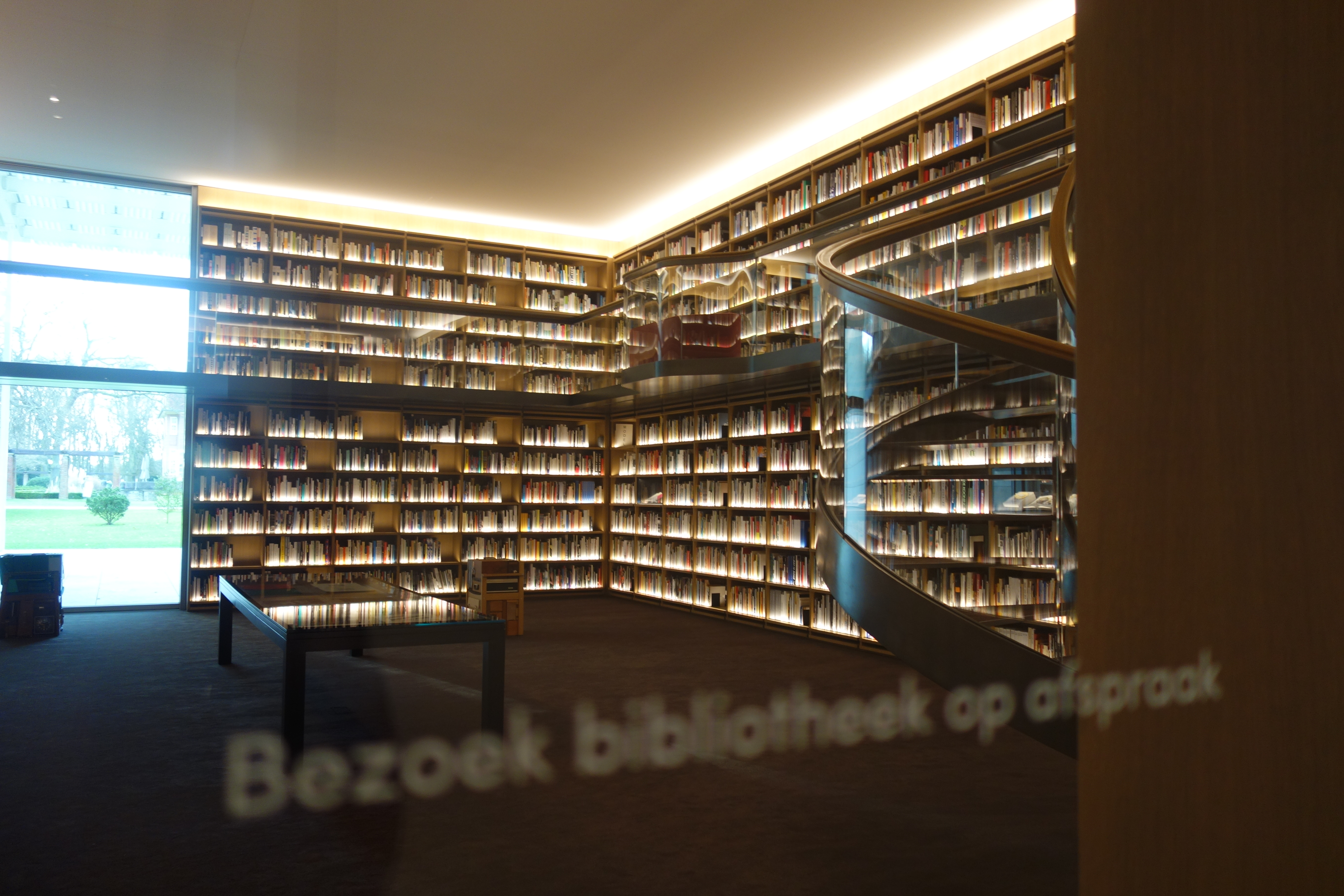
Library

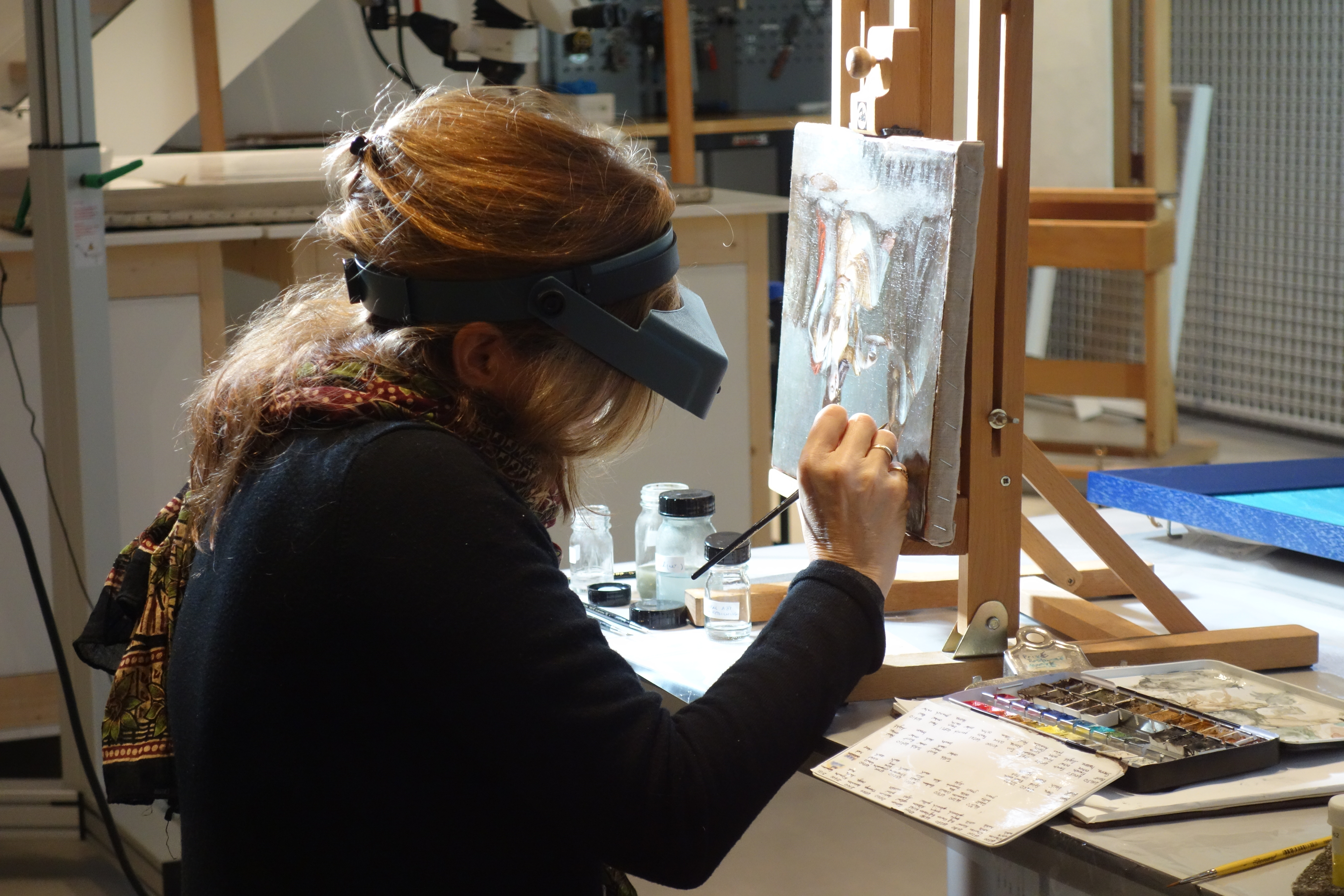
Restorer at work

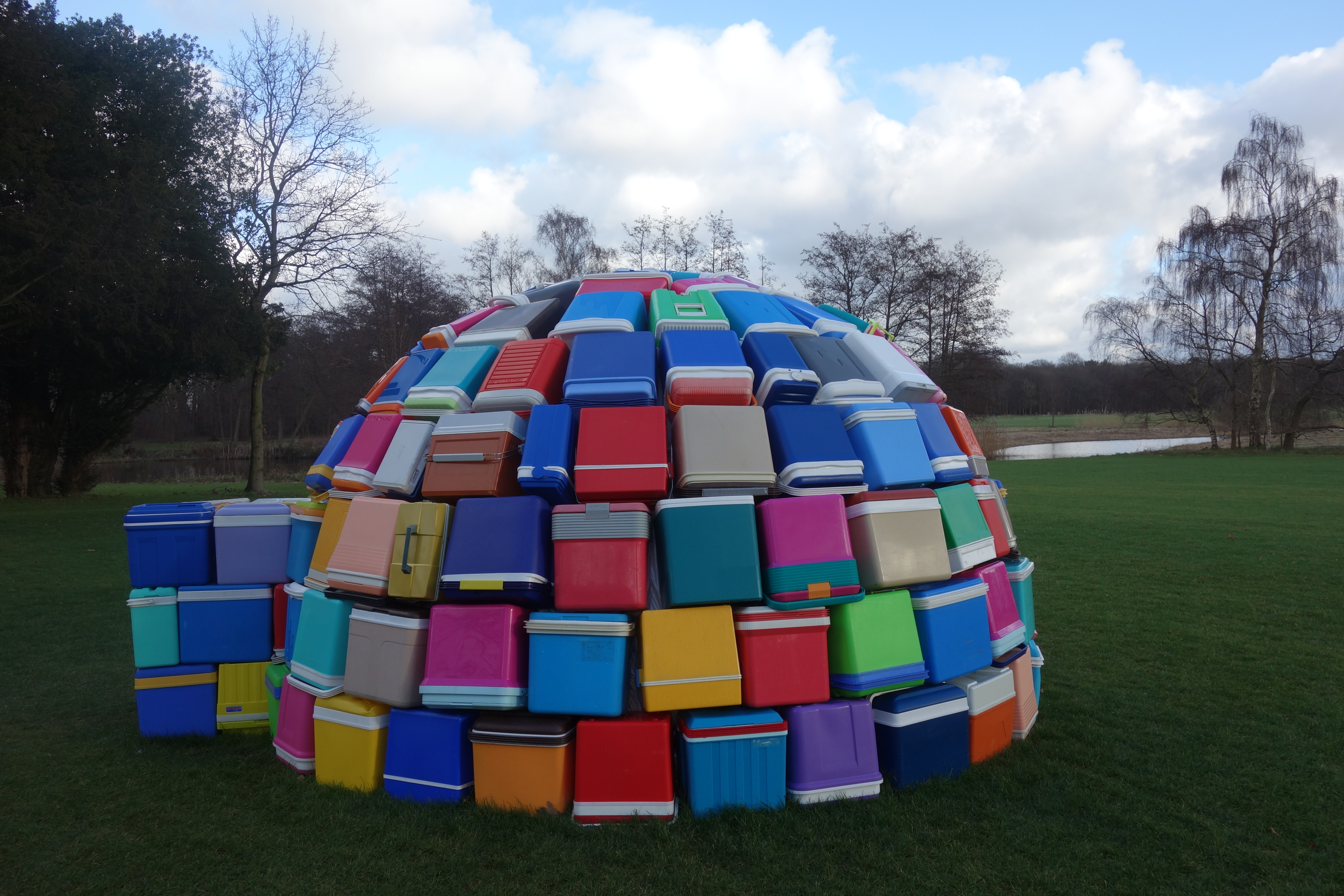
Last Summer by Michael Johansson

== Museum ==
The construction of the museum started in 2013. The official opening happened on September 10, 2016 in presence of King Willem-Alexander of the Netherlands.

== Caldic Collection ==
The Caldic Collection of modern and contemporary art, brought together in the seventies, consists of paintings, sculptures, mixed media and photography, mostly from the 20th century. Works include Ai Weiwei, Atelier van Lieshout, Philip Akkerman, Louise Bourgeois, Marcel Broodthaers, Joseph Cornell, Tracey Emin, Damien Hirst, Anselm Kiefer, Yayoi Kusama, Ron Mueck, Mauricio Nannucci, Ernesto Neto, Bridget Riley, Cindy Sherman, Sam Taylor-Wood, Wayne Thiebaud, James Turrell, Gyz la Riviere and Robert Zandvliet.

Sculptures in the nearby Sculpture Garden Clingenbosch, property of the family Van Caldenborgh can be visited by appointment. Here works by Armando, Antony Gormley, Anish Kapoor, Sol LeWitt, Richard Long, Paul McCartney, Mario Merz, Henry Moore, Petra Morenzi, Panamarenko, Jean Tinguely and Carel Visser are on display.

La femme au fauteuil (Fernand Léger, 1913)

Marine, soleil couchant (James Ensor, 1940)

Jazz
(Henri Matisse, 1947)
