= Dane Mitchell =

New Zealand artist

- Born: 1976 (age 49–50); Auckland, New Zealand
- Education: Auckland University of Technology, Carnegie Mellon University
- Known for: sculpture
- Notable work: Post hoc (2019)
- Website: danemitchell.co.nz

Dane Mitchell is a New Zealand artist who represented New Zealand at the 58th Venice Biennale International Art Exhibition.

== Biography ==
Dane Mitchell was born in 1976, Auckland. In 1997, he studied at Carnegie Mellon University, Pittsburgh and graduated from the then Auckland Institute of Technology in 1998 with a BFA in sculpture. In 2012, he returned to receive a Masters degree from Auckland University of Technology.

In 2009-2010, Mitchell was in the DAAD Artists-in-Berlin Program, following a 2008 residence at the Gasworks in London. In 2011, he was the Dunedin Public Art Gallery’s Visiting Artist. In 2016, he was a Cove Park Artist-in Residence.

In 2009, he won the New Zealand National Contemporary Art Award for his work Collateral, which was controversial as it was made of packaging that had been used to transport other artists' artworks and had been formed by the curators using instructions from Mitchell as he was in Berlin at the time.

Mitchell now lives in Melbourne and holds an academic position at the Victorian College of the Arts, University of Melbourne.

== Exhibitions and artworks ==
In 2019, He represented New Zealand at the 58th Venice Biennale International Art Exhibition with a work was titled Post hoc. He has also been included in São Paulo Biennial, (2004); Busan Biennale (2010); Ljubljana Biennia (2011); Singapore Biennale (2011); Gwangju Biennale (2012); Liverpool Biennial (2012); Sydney Biennale (2016); Thailand Biennale (2018) and Bangkok Biennale (2020).

He has held solo exhibitions at Mori Art Museum, Tokyo, Japan (2017); Institut d'art contemporain, Villeurbanne/Rhône-Alpes, France (2018) and Te Papa Museum of New Zealand, Wellington, New Zealand.

His artworks are in the collections of Auckland Art Gallery and Christchurch Art Gallery.
