= Jean-François Prost =

- Occupation: Visual Artist
- Years active: 1998 - Present

Jean-François Prost is a visual artist based in Montreal, Quebec. He has a degree in environmental design at Université du Québec à Montréal and in Architecture at Carleton University (Ottawa). He is mostly known for his investigations in spatial and social practices in the city, his practice in relational art and for being the founder of the artistic platform Adaptive Actions. Among other projects, he has worked and exposed at La Biennale de Montreal (2002), International Architecture Biennal Rotterdam (2003), Liverpool Biennial (2006), Lisbon Architecture Triennal (2013) and International Architecture Biennale of São Paulo (2013).

== Artistic work ==
=== Chambre avec vues (1998) ===
His first project, Chambre avec vues (1998) consisted in a wooden cabin placed in a vacant lot in Montréal. Screens in the exterior walls of the cabin would show videos of a natural landscape and a live transmission from the inner part of the cabin as some other screens would show real time video taken from the outside with another video camera.

=== Convivialités électives (2000) ===
In the winter of the year 2000, Jean-François Prost installed a shelter on the frozen waters of the Saguenay River in Chicoutimi. Prost lived in the space for several weeks. The inspiration of this project came from the necessity for creating a dialogue with the surroundings and the environment but also with the local inhabitants of this borough of Saguenay, Quebec.

=== All Aboard (2007) ===
September 2007: authorities surround the London 2012 Olympic Site with an 18-km blue wall and repaint daily any form of expression and of visual protest. Abandoned, empty paint cans revealing the code and name of the paint color is reproduced by Adaptive Actions to perform an action. Under the premise "Only blue remains", the action All Aboard is born.

=== Heteropolis (Publication) (2013) ===
Along with the Adaptive Actions platform, Marie-Pier Boucher, Jean-Maxime Dufresne, Gema Melgar, and other collaborators such as Kyong Park, developed through the concept of Heteropolis a publication containing 53 contributions which take different forms: images, texts, interviews, or actions related to different questions about open spaces and indeterminacy, the facilitation of the hybridization of what already exists, and simultaneously value difference and mobilize new forms of urban relations, exchange, and diversity.

The publication was launched in the Leonard and Bina Ellen Gallery of Concordia University and was followed by a series of conferences and workshops in the University of Lethbridge and Optica Centre d'art Contemporain.

=== Stopping (2015-) ===
Currently, Prost has been working in a series of workshops at MUAC and the Leonard and Bina Ellen Gallery aiming towards a publication regarding the resistance to the increasing pace of life experienced in big cities around the world and in particular Mexico City. These workshops gathered students and professionals from different areas of study.

=== Acronymia Sao Paulo (2016) ===
As a result of a series of workshops, Jean-François Prost and a group of people from different backgrounds gathered by an open call re-enacted a project the artist presented in the Rotterdam Biennal called Acronymia. By manual processes, Jean-François, along with the participants, created a series of acronym printings over fabric objects and clothes expressing phrases with personal meanings for everyone involved in the project. These phrases could take form of social statements as well as personal thoughts or ideas.
