= Mathilde ter Heijne =

Dutch artist

Mathilde ter Heijne (born 1969 in Strasbourg, France) is a Berlin-based Dutch artist primarily working within the mediums of video, performance, and installation practices. She studied in Maastricht at the Stadsacademie (1988–1992), in Amsterdam at the Rijksacademie voor Beeldende Kunsten (1992–1994). From 2011 to 2018, she was a professor of visual art, performance, media, and installation at the Kunsthochschule Kassel. She has been a professor of visual arts, performance, and media at the Berlin University of the Arts since 2018.

== Work ==
Ter Heijne's research-based artistic practice is grounded in intersectional feminism. In the 1990s, her video art destabilized patriarchal tropes in literature and cinema through elaborate re-stagings and role reversals. Examples include Mathilde, Mathilde, in which the artist mimics suicidal female characters from film adaptations, and her 2001 video project Small Things End, Great things Endure where she offers a reading of Uwe Johnson's Jahrestage (1934–84). In both of these works, ter Heijne responds to female and culturally embedded generational trauma where in the end, be it a story, movie, or in real life, the woman always dies. This internal perpetual state of abjection or what Griselda Pollock has called the trauma of being born into a phallocentric world are both concepts that ter Heijne contends with and untimely rips apart. By "playing the victim," ter Heijne subtly reverses power roles transforming woman as object into woman as subject.

In her more recent work (2005–present), Ter Heijne takes an activist approach to art-making, treating it as a participatory process. In her ongoing project, Woman to Go, she collects the biographies of women from the 19th century who are slipping into oblivion. To counteract cultural amnesia, she presents these biographies within the context of an art institution, converting once-relevant, forgotten lives into testimonies that resonate in the present.

For ter Heijne, ritual and ceremony are structures for artistic observation and potential emancipation. Ritual, historically, is where woman has both lost and gained her power. For instance, marriage formatively and sometimes presently is a social contract entrapping women into what Simone de Beauvoir calls a Second Sex. Fuck Patriarchy! (2004) exemplifies this subservient, minor position of the Second Sex that woman historically occupied in bourgeoisie societies. Ter Heijne points to Dutch society within the 17th century as the originating point for this kind of patriarchal oppression. She places Vermeer's paintings of domicile female happiness at the apex of this banal perpetration of evil that glorifies woman as slaves. Within both the mythic and non-western culture, however, ritual has been a site for woman to seize power or be rescued from precarity. In Menschen Opfern, Mathilde ter Heijne's sculptural body double stands in for the body of Iphigenia who in Greek tragedy was saved from sacrifice to become a priestess. In the installation, cast bodies lay on an elevated stage as an operatic chorus from Christoph Willibald Gluck's opera Iphigénie en Tauride is heard in the background. The theatre stage and the chorus are both structures where participants act together in unison to weave together shared stories and experiences.

== Statements ==
Oliver Koerner von Gustorf in ArtMag: "her art really does aim at what really hurts—the mechanisms of oppressing women, domestic violence, marginalization, and self-sacrifice that lie hidden behind the facades of purportedly enlightened or intact family relationships."

Sophia Trollmann in the covering handout of the exhibition Performing Change: “She puts alternative ways of seeing and experiential values up for discussion in order to enable and implement a change in perspective, to create new realities.”

== Catalogues ==
- Mathilde ter Heijne: Performing Change. Museum für Neue Kunst – Städtische Museen Freiburg, Germany: Sternberg Press, 2015.
- Mathilde ter Heijne: Any Day Now. Kunsthalle Nürnberg im KunstKulturQuartier, Germany and Kunstmuseum Linz, Austria: Verlag für Moderne Kunst, Nürnberg 2010.
- Mathilde ter Heijne: If it's me, it's not me. Ostfilder, Germany: Hatje Cantz Verlag, 2008.
- Ingrid Calame, Mathilde ter Heijne, Jörg Wagner. Kunstverein Hannover, Germany, 2004.
- Mathilde ter Heijne: Tragedy. Migros Museum für Gegenwartskunst, Zurich, Switzerland: Revolver Publishing, 2002.

== Selected solo exhibitions ==
- 2016 – Blood, Sweat and Tears, Galerie in Körnerpark, Berlin
- 2015 – It Will Be!, Kunstverein, Haus am Lützowplatz, Berlin
- 2014 – Performing Change, Museum für Neue Kunst Freiburg
- 2011 – Any Day Now, Lentos Museum, Linz
- 2010 – Any Day Now, Kunsthalle Nürnberg
- 2009 – Long Live Matriarchy!, Stedelijk Museum Bureau, Amsterdam
- 2006 – Woman To Go, Berlinische Galerie, Berlin
- 2005 – BASE 103, Götz Collection, Munich
- 2002 – Tragedy, Migros Museum für Gegenwartskunst, Zurich
