= Laura Belém =

Brazilian artist and lecturer

- Movement: Central Saint Martins College of Art and Design

Laura Belém is a Brazilian artist and lecturer. Her work has been exhibited in Brazil, Denmark, Canada, France, Japan, Italy and the United Kingdom.

Born 1974, Belo Horizonte (Brazil), Belém graduated with an MA degree in Fine Art at Central Saint Martins College of Art and Design in London, UK in 2000. She has been awarded grants by bodies such as The Triangle Association in Brooklyn and The Casa de Velázquez in Madrid.

== Work ==
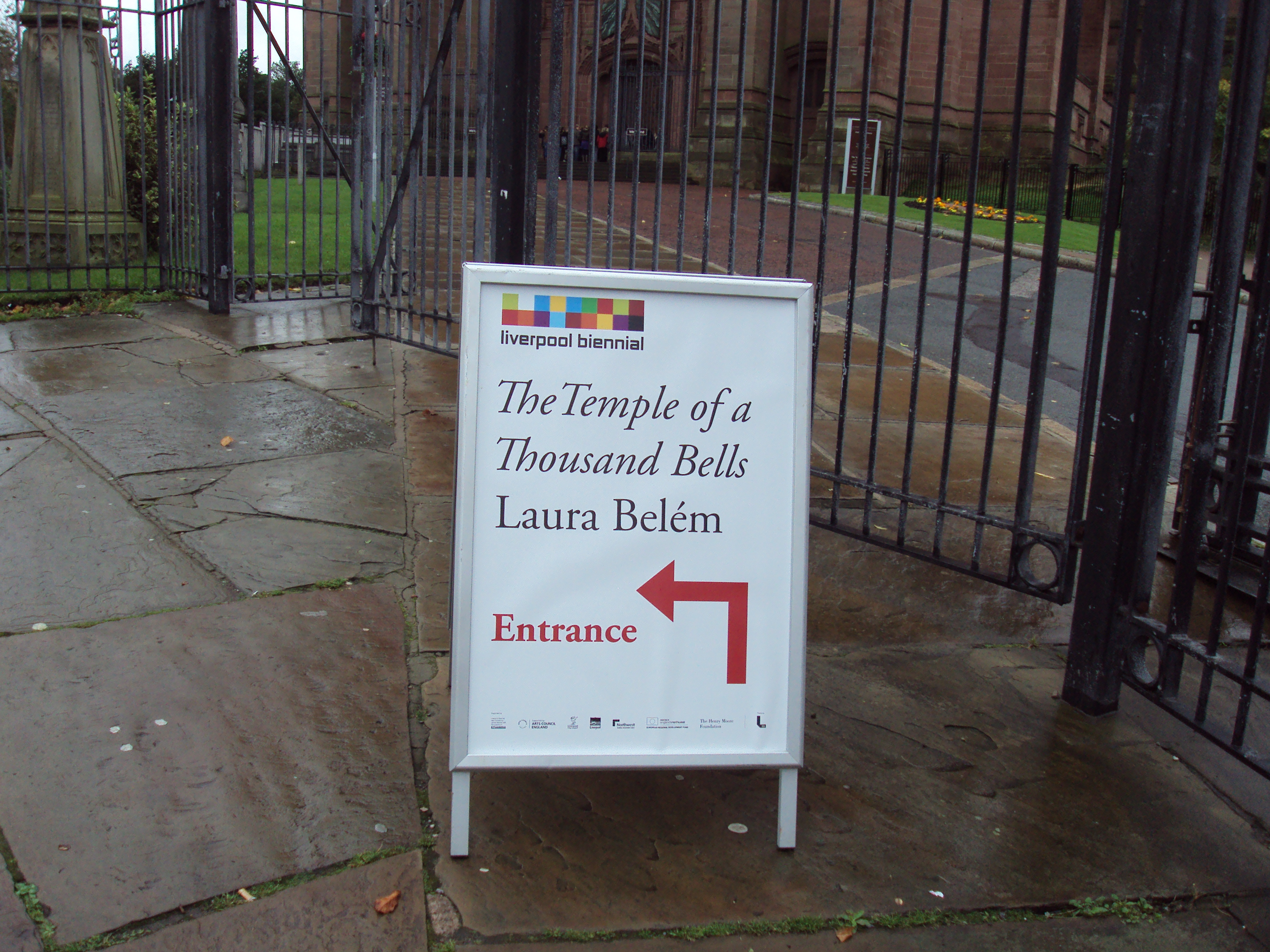
2010 exhibition in Liverpool

According to the Liverpool Biennial 2008 project review, "narratives of memory, displacement and transcience" are all important aspects of Belém's artworks.

In August 2010: "One Thousand Bells", for the 10th Biennial in Liverpool, held at The Oratory (Former Chapel of St James Cemetery) consists of 1,000 glass bells, held by nylon string and without bell clappers. The only sound of the piece comes from a recorded audio. Inspiration for the piece came from an ancient legend with "a temple with a thousand bells that sank into the ocean and of a young man who sat for days by the sea hoping to catch the sound of the melodious bells again".

Images of water and boats appear in other Belém works, such as "Enamoured" (2005), for the Venice Biennial, in which two rowing boats with timed searchlights are on a course to find each other in the canal.

Her film Shipwreck shows a drawing of an old caravel "gradually melting into an indistinct pool of colour". According to Palazzo Strozzi website:

The ship represents the Portuguese conquest of Brazil. While the image creates a link with that past, its extraneous nature is expressed at the same time through the use of the two techniques of drawing and video. A distance is created between today and yesterday. The image dissolves. The past fades until it disappears completely. The video makes the artist’s search visible once again and transports its result – her present life – into the here and now.
