= Qasim Riza Shaheen =

British artist and writer (born 1971)

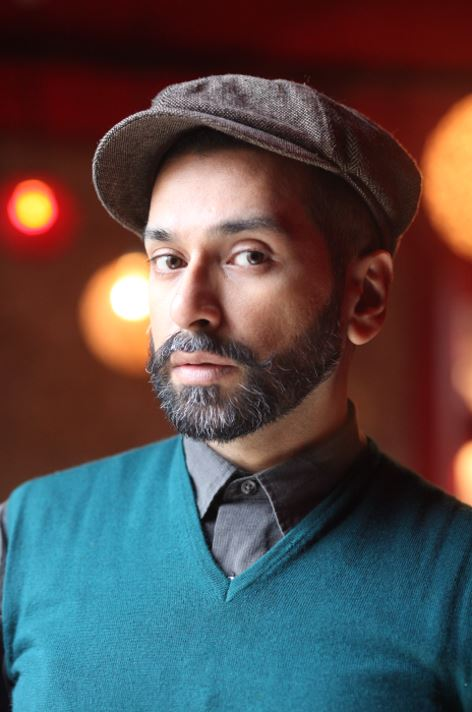
- Born: 1971 (age 54–55)
- Known for: Performance art, visual art, writer
- Notable work: Misplaced memoirs (2011–2015); Autoportraits in love-like conditions (2014); Stains & Stencils (2005–2007); Queer courtesan (2007–2010); Nine acts of reciprocity (2010)
- Movement: Conceptual art
- Website: "http://www.qasimrizashaheen.com"

Qasim Riza Shaheen (born 1971) is a British artist and writer based in Manchester. Working across participatory performance, installation, film and photography, Shaheen's practice explores memory, notions of beauty, sexuality, love and, more broadly, fundamental concerns about human nature.

"In films, video performances, photographs and mixed-media drawings, Qasim Riza Shaheen presents his affecting reflections on love and loss...For him, self-portraiture is more a matter of imaginative self-creation than any pretence of authentic self-definition...His enactments of queer romance, straight social alienation, and the universal melodramas of unrequited desire are choreographed with painful sensitivity."

== Career ==
Qasim Riza Shaheen's work has been exhibited and programmed widely, including at Asia Contemporary Art Week, New York; Cornerhouse, Manchester; mac in Birmingham; Southbank Centre, London; SPILL Festival of Performance, London; Brighton International Festival; Victoria & Albert Museum, London; Liverpool Biennial; Arnolfini, Bristol; National Review of Live Art, Glasgow, Scotland; La Boral, Gijon; Trouble Festival, Les Halles, Brussels; CityArts and Project Arts Centre, Dublin; Corona Cork Film Festival, Ireland; Castlefield Gallery, Manchester; Twelve Gates Arts, Philadelphia; and Alhamra National Gallery in Lahore, Pakistan, where he was invited as an international resident artist and subsequently as an associate professor at the prestigious National College of Arts in Lahore and Islamabad.

== Prizes and awards ==
Qasim Riza Shaheen has received several Arts Council of England bursaries as well as international commissions. He is featured on the British Council's Theatre and Dance network which promotes the best of UK performing arts. He was nominated for the Northern Art Prize in 2010. He has had several acquisitions made on his work by museums, galleries and private collectors.

== Artist Publications & Articles ==
The last known pose: Essays and reflections on the works of Qasim Riza Shaheen – forthcoming Cornerhouse publication 2018 Hushlak M. A & Pearl M. (Eds.)

(I am)mute(with love), Live Art Development Agency, London (forthcoming DVD release 2017)

MyNoir: Everybody Says I'm Fine in Filmint.

Misplaced Memoirs in Performing Ethos: An International Journal of Ethics in Theatre and Performance, Vol 2, No 2 (Intellect, August 2012) p. 155.

Nine acts of reciprocity. Oldham: Gallery Oldham, 2010.

Liliquoi Blue: God made me a boy. Dublin: CityArts, 2010.

‘The NRLA Ball (Both Touching the Sky and Eating Dust…)’ in National Review of Live Art 1979–2010: a personal history, Ed. Dee Heddon. Glasgow: NRLA, 2010. p.90.

‘Queer courtesan (Sixteen processes of beautification)’, South Asian Popular Culture, Vol 7, No 3, Routledge (October 2009) p.211-215.

Stains & Stencils. Cork: Cork International Film Festival, 2009.

Khusra: Stains & Stencils. Manchester: Shisha/Cornerhouse Publications, 2007.

Only the moon to play with. Manchester: Arts Council England, 2004.

== Kathak classical dance art ==
Qasim Riza Shaheen was initiated as formal dance disciple of Pakistani Kathak dancer Nahid Siddiqui (Disciple of Maharaj Kathak & Pandit Birju Maharaj) in the 1990s and continues to be under her tutelage to date. He has performed internationally with Nahid Siddiqui and Company as a dancer at venues including the South Bank Centre, London, Royal Albert Hall, London and at Auditorium Parco della Musica, Rome, Italy. His solo dance work has been showcased at the British Dance Edition 2008 held in Liverpool.
