= Filip Gilissen =

Belgian artist

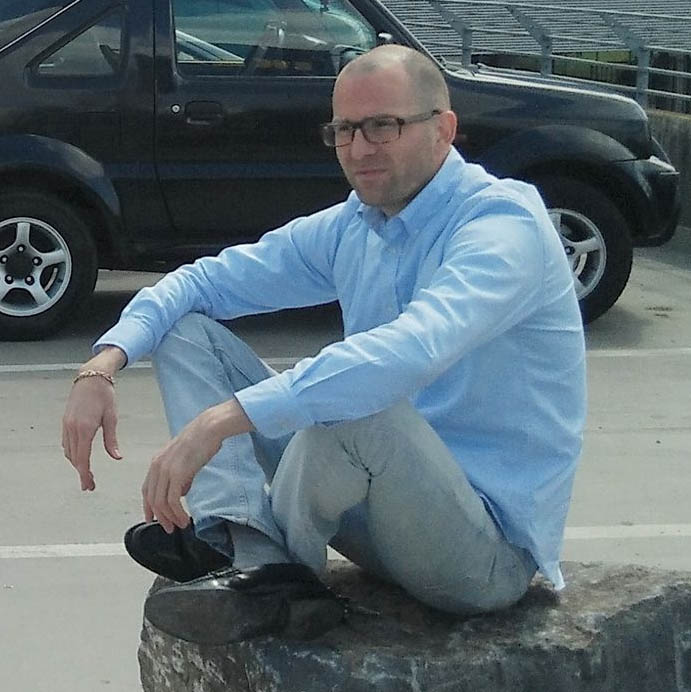
Filip Gilissen

Filip Gilissen (born 1980 in Brussels, Belgium) is a Belgian artist. He has had solo exhibitions at Museum of Contemporary Art, Antwerp (MUHKA) and Etablissement d'en Face (Brussels). He has participated in group exhibitions at Life Sport (Athens), Panicz (Ostend), Fotomuseum Winterthur, Bucharest Biennale, LISTE Performance Project (Basel), Witte de With Center for Contemporary Art (Rotterdam), Kunsthalle Nürnberg, Liverpool Biennial, MARTa Herford, and Museum Voorlinden (The Hague).

Gilissen is the co-curator of Contrastissimo a research project about class and taste. This multifaceted, anonymous series has included projects in unusual spaces such as a nightclub, a hotel lounge, and a high-speed train between Brussels and Paris. Contrastissimo has produced a cast of 7 fictional characters that were exhibited at Kunsthalle Nürnberg and at 4649 in Tokyo.

== Sources ==
- Ulrichs, David (20 September 2011). "The Dutch Take to the Streets". Art in America.
