= Sally Tallant =

Sally Tallant, OBE, is an English educator, curator and arts administrator originally from Leeds.

She served as director of the Queens Museum from 2019 until 2026 when she was announced as the incoming director of London's Hayward Gallery where she has previously worked as a curator. Prior to her time in New York City, Tallant was the artistic director of the Liverpool Biennial (2011–2019) and head of programs at London's Serpentine Gallery from 2001 to 2011.
