= Gary Disley =

English rugby league footballer

Personal information
- Born: 2 April 1966 (age 60) Salford, England

Playing information
- Position: Prop, Second-row
Club
| Years | Team | Pld | T | G | FG | P |
|---|---|---|---|---|---|---|
| 1983–92 | Salford | 184 | 28 | 5 | 0 | 122 |
Representative
| Years | Team | Pld | T | G | FG | P |
| 1987 | Great Britain U21 | 1 | 0 | 0 | 0 | 0 |

Gary Disley is a former professional rugby league footballer who played in the 1980s and 1990s. He played at representative level for Great Britain (Under-21s), and at club level for Salford City Reds, as a prop.

== Playing career ==
Disley joined Salford from Leigh Miners in June 1983. He spent seven years at the club, appearing in 92 games.

=== International honours ===
Disley won one cap for Great Britain under-21's as a substitute.
