= Frances Disley =

UK artist

- Born: 1976 (age 49–50); Warrington, UK
- Occupations: artist, especially prints

Frances Disley is a print-maker, artist and curator based in Liverpool. Her work explores colour and form as well as having a strong connection with natural history.

== Personal life and education ==
Frances Disley was born in Warrington in 1976. In 2004, she followed her BA in fine art printmaking from the University of Wolverhampton with a master's degree in printmaking at the Royal College of Art. She has been manager of the Bluecoat Print Studios in Liverpool and lectured at Liverpool Hope University. She is based in Liverpool.

== Practice and exhibitions ==
Disley's works has been part of several individual and solo exhibitions. She tries to show her thought processes about colour and form when creating an artwork, including using her own body to animate the works. Although printmaking is her focus, she will explore her ideas with other techniques such as photography, sculpture and drawing.

Disley was an associate artist of the Liverpool Biennial from 2015 - 2018 with the aim of developing her international contacts and reputation in collaboration with an international curator. She has subsequently acted as an artist advisor in commissioning new works by artists.

Disley's works have been shown in exhibitions, including:

- 2015 Grosvenor Museum, Chester: Metamorphosis
- 2016 Liverpool Biennial: Blaze painted on a double-decker bus; I’m a really good dancer video at the India Buildings.
- 2019 Humber Street Gallery, Hull the food-related living sculpture The Cucumber Fell in the Sand.
- 2021 Coventry City of Culture at the Herbert Art Gallery and Museum where she contributed a new work to UnNatural History that explored the role of artists in the science of natural history and climate change. Her work was a response to the natural science collection at the
- 2022 Walker Art Gallery, Liverpool, as part of the Refractive Pool exhibition of work by local artists.
