= Silvia Bächli =

Swiss visual artist (b. 1956)

- Born: 16 March 1956 (age 69); Wettingen, Baden District, Aargau, Switzerland
- Education: Haute École d'Arts Appliques de Bâle, École Supérieure des Beaux-Arts, Genève
- Occupation(s): Visual artist, photographer, educator
- Known for: Painting, drawing
- Spouse: Eric Hattan
- Awards: Manor Cultural Prize (1990)
- Website: https://www.silviabaechli.ch/

Silvia Bächli (born 1956) is a Swiss visual artist, photographer, and educator. She works primarily in painting and drawing. She has taught art at the Academy of Fine Arts, Karlsruhe (German: Staatliche Akademie der Bildenden Künste Karlsruhe) since 1993.

== Biography ==
Silvia Bächli was born on 16 March 1956 in Wettingen, Baden District, Aargau, Switzerland. She attended Haute École d'Arts Appliques de Bâle, and École Supérieure des Beaux-Arts, Genève.

In 2009, her work was part of the Swiss pavilion at the 53rd Venice Biennale. Bächli has received many awards and honors including the Manor Cultural Prize in the Canton of Aargau in 1990, Montres Breguet Prize for contemporary art in 1991, the Meret-Oppenheim Prize in 2003, and the drawing prize from the Daniel and Florence Guerlain Fondation d’Art Contemporain in 2007.

Her work can be found in museum collections, including at the Museum of Modern Art in New York City.

== See also ==
- List of Swiss painters
