= Sylvie Blocher =

French video artist

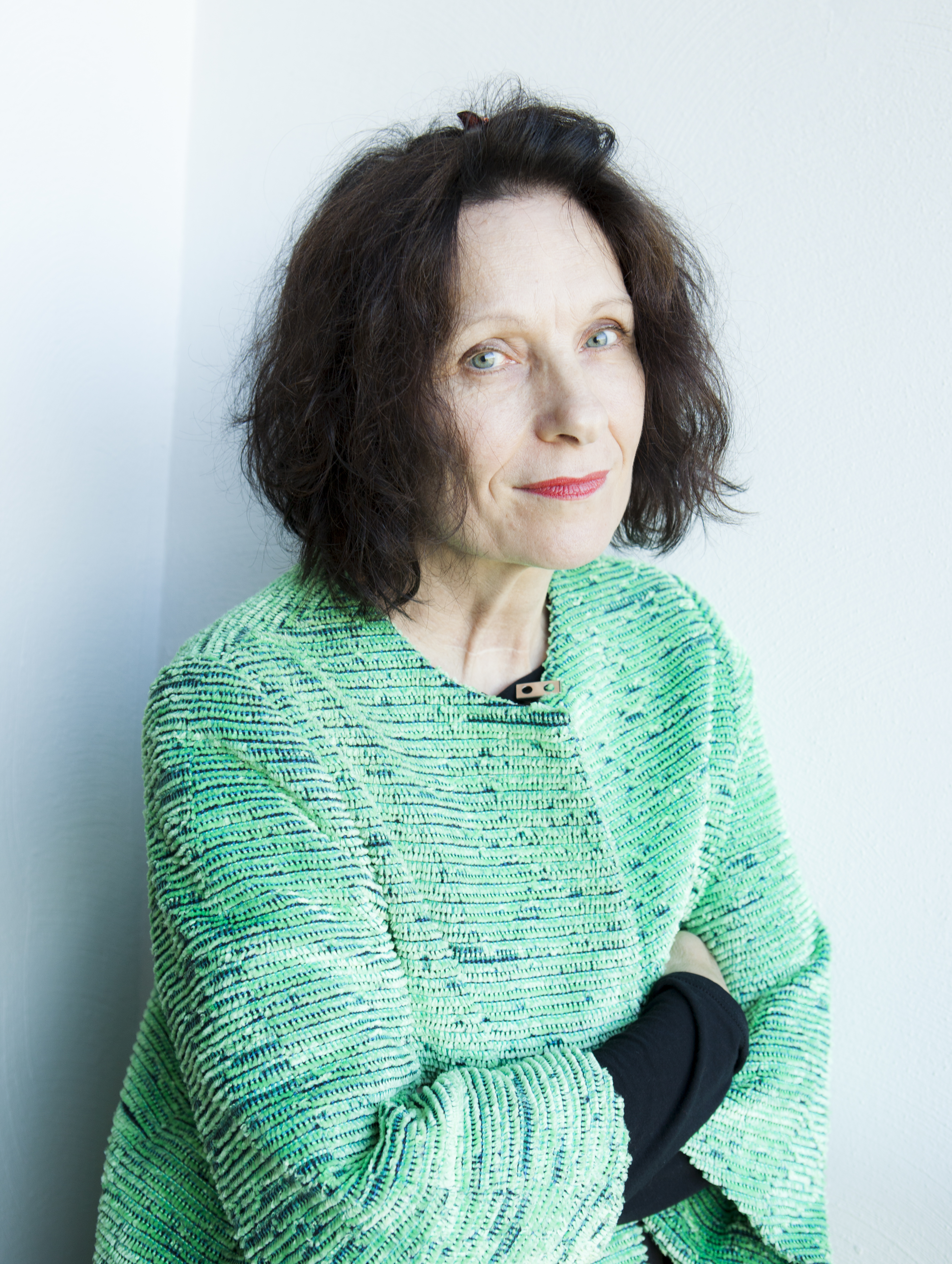
- Born: 1953 (age 72–73); Morschwiller-le-Bas, Alsace
- Known for: Video art
- Website: sylvieblocher.net

Sylvie Blocher (born 1953) is a French artist.

Blocher is known for her video works that engage local communities. Her long-running project Living Pictures is a series of video portraits that, according to Blocher, attempts to "render speech in images".

== Solo exhibitions ==
- 1995 Feminin/ Masculin Centre Pompidou, Paris
- 1998 Living Pictures York University Art Gallery, Toronto
- 2007 Living Pictures/Men in Gold San Francisco Museum of Modern Art
- 2010 Sylvie Blocher: What is Missing?, Museum of Contemporary Art, Sydney
- 2015 S'inventer Autrement Mudam Luxembourg and Centre Regional d’Art Contemporain Languedoc-Roussillon, Seite
- 2016 Living Pictures Musée d'art et d'histoire de Saint-Denis, Saint-Deins, France

== Collections ==
Her work is included in the collections of the Musée national des beaux-arts du Québec, the Institut d’art contemporain Villeurbanne/Rhône-Alpes, MUDAM Luxembourg, the Centre Pompidou and the San Francisco Museum of Modern Art
