= Nicholas Hlobo =

South African artist (born 1975)

- Born: 1975 (age 50–51); Cape Town
- Occupation: Artist

Nicholas Hlobo is a South African artist based in Johannesburg, South Africa. He was born in 1975 in Cape Town. He earned his Bachelor of Technology from Technikon Witwatersrand in 2002. He creates large sculptural works that are highly structured. Through his work, he navigates his identity as a queer Xhosa man in South Africa, reevaluating the definitions of masculinity and sexuality in his country. The variance between femininity and masculinity is created by his use of materials such as rubber inner tubes, ribbon, organza, lace, and found objects. Hlobo cuts and sews objects together to symbolize the idea of the healing that comes after a tearing apart in order to express his interest in the history of colonization in South Africa as well as the overt and covert ways that colonization occurs in modern life.

== Early life ==
Nicholas Hlobo was born in Cape Town, South Africa, and grew up in Dutywa on the Eastern Cape, a region previously known as the Transkei during the Apartheid era in South Africa. Raised by his maternal grandmother, Hlobo recalls her being strict, yet the source of many values of love and wisdom. Despite her death in 1985, the “rebel, and most probably a feminist,” in Hlobo's own words, continued to influence him, instilling in him to stay true to himself always. As a male born into a colonial Zulu culture, Hlobo was both baptized in a Christian church as an infant, and made an imbeleko in a Xhosa tradition that introduces young Xhosa men to the spiritual realm. The artist was also given two names : Nicholas and Batandwa, which means "beloved" or "beloved people" in Xhosa.

In an interview with journalist Malka Gouzer, Hlobo recalls the origin of his artistic journey, which began with the young boy spending his time drawing the human body as it appeared in his imagination. He moved to Johannesburg as a young adult in 1995, one year after Nelson Mandela was elected as South African president and ended Apartheid.

== Significant artworks ==
One of Hlobo's most well-known artworks, Fak'unyawo, tie together feminine and masculine qualities through material. The use of fluid material and aura blend metaphorical and literal features within the artwork. This piece was created using ribbon, leather, and a wooden shoe lace on cotton canvas. The title meaning "insert your foot." According to an interview recorded for video series Art21, Fak'unyawo interprets the idea of "testing the water" or having the courage to "take the chance." The composition incorporates the heel of the shoe and extends into the stitched lines of thread.

== Awards ==
Hlobo is the winner of the 2006 Tollman Award for Visual Art. His honors and residencies also include the Standard Bank Young Artist Award (2009) and Rolex Visual Arts Protégé (2010–11). He was a finalist for the Future Generation Art Prize in 2010. In 2010, Hlobo was selected as a protégé by mentor Sir Anish Kapoor as part of the Rolex Mentor and Protégé Arts Initiative, an international philanthropic program that pairs masters in their disciplines with emerging talents for a year of one-to-one creative exchange. Nicholas Hlobo received his first Villa Extraordinary Award for Sculpture in 2016. He has had significant shows in the Smithsonian National Museum of African Art, Museum Beelden aan Zee, The Hague (2016), and Uppsala Konstmuseum, Sweden (2017).

== Inspirations ==
Nicholas Hlobo’s sexuality and culture are an integral part of who he is, not only as a person, but also as an artist. As a gay Xhosa man, Hlobo demonstrates the intermingling of queer identity and Xhosa culture through his artwork, showing similarities between the two. For instance, as he explains, both queer and Xhosa cultures “find such joy and celebration in being a man.” An example of this would be the Xhosa ritual called Ulwaluko. This is a ritual that embodies masculinity, with its main purpose to transform boys into men, involving circumcision.

Another similarity that queer and Xhosa cultures share is what Hlobo calls 'masquerading', or dressing up. Hlobo says both queer people and Xhosa traditionalists "love a masquerade," and that "[t]hey love to dress up as something they're not." In queer culture drag queens exemplify the masquerade, wearing items coded as feminine to perform. In Xhosa culture, an example of masquerading, to Hlobo, is the initiation ceremony, where "you are not supposed to be seen, especially by women." Through his observations, Hlobo knows that costume isn't necessary in order to masquerade, because everyone wears one depending on situation and context.

The final similarity Hlobo noticed between the two cultures is the process of re-naming. Similar to a drag queen’s stage name, Hlobo explains that some Xhosa initiations and traditions require the man “to take on a new name.” Hlobo says that “you have to take on a new name which says that you have gone through this rite of passage now and we will give you another name that sort of celebrates this stage or your movement in life as a man or your movement in life as a woman.”

== Exhibitions ==
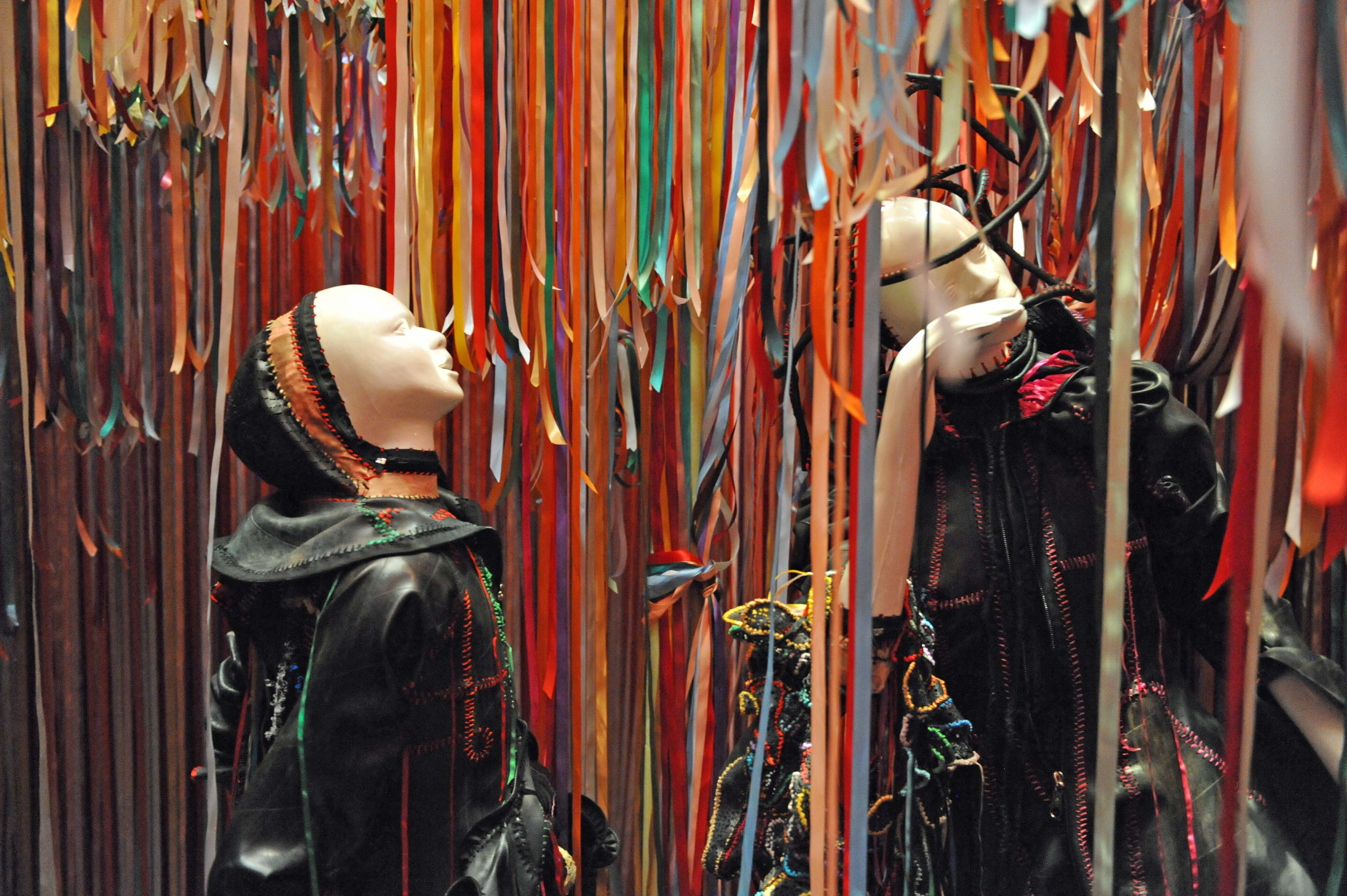
Nicholas Hlobo, Ndize, 2010 by Julian Stallabrass

Hlobo's work has been exhibited in the Tate Modern in London, the South African National Gallery, and the Institute of Contemporary Art, Boston. His work has been included in the Havana Biennial of 2009 and the Guangzhou Triennial of 2008. Hlobo was the first black South African to participate as a festival artist at the Aardklop arts festival in Potchefstroom in 2008. A major survey exhibition of Hlobo's work was in the National Museum of Art, Architecture and Design in Oslo, Norway, from 4 March to 29 May 2011. Hlobo and David Goldblatt were the only two South African artists invited by curator Bice Curiger to exhibit work on the international pavilion IllUMinations of the 2011 Venice Biennale. He is included on La Triennale 2012 in Paris and on The Rainbow Nation, an exhibition of three generations of sculpture from South Africa, at The Hague. Hlobo was commissioned to create a new live performance for Performa 17. He has also been selected for the 18th Biennale of Sydney. In 2013 and 2014 his work will feature in exhibitions in Miami (Intethe), Aalborg (Out of Fashion : Textiles in International Contemporary Art), San Francisco (Public Intimacy : Art and other extraordinary Acts in South Africa) and The Divine Comedy. Heaven, Purgatory and Hell Revisited by Contemporary African Artists -Museum für Moderne Kunst (MMK), Frankfurt/Main.
