= Jemima Wyman =

Australian contemporary artist (born 1977)

- Born: 1977 (age 48–49); Mackay, Queensland, Australia
- Education: Queensland University of Technology; California Institute of the Arts (MFA, 2007)

Jemima Wyman (born 1977) is an Australian contemporary artist best known for her photo collage work. She has also worked with performance and video art.

== Early life ==
Wyman was born in Mackay and grew up in Queensland.

After earning a bachelor's degree from Queensland University of Technology, Wyman attended California Institute of the Arts, graduating with a master's degree in fine arts in 2007.

== Career ==
Wyman first began doing performance art in the 1990s, with pieces inspired by feminist themes. She began exhibiting in Australia in 1996, and began exhibiting internationally in 2004.

In 2004, Wyman came to Los Angeles, California after being awarded a studio residency by the Australian Government. Wyman has continued to work in Los Angeles, and is a lecturer in the art department of the University of California, Los Angeles. In Los Angeles, she is represented by the Koreatown-based Commonwealth and Council.

=== Style ===
Wyman is interested in protest and its relationship to art, particularly the idea of visual resistance, such as the use of patterns by "outside groups", and Guy Fawkes masks.

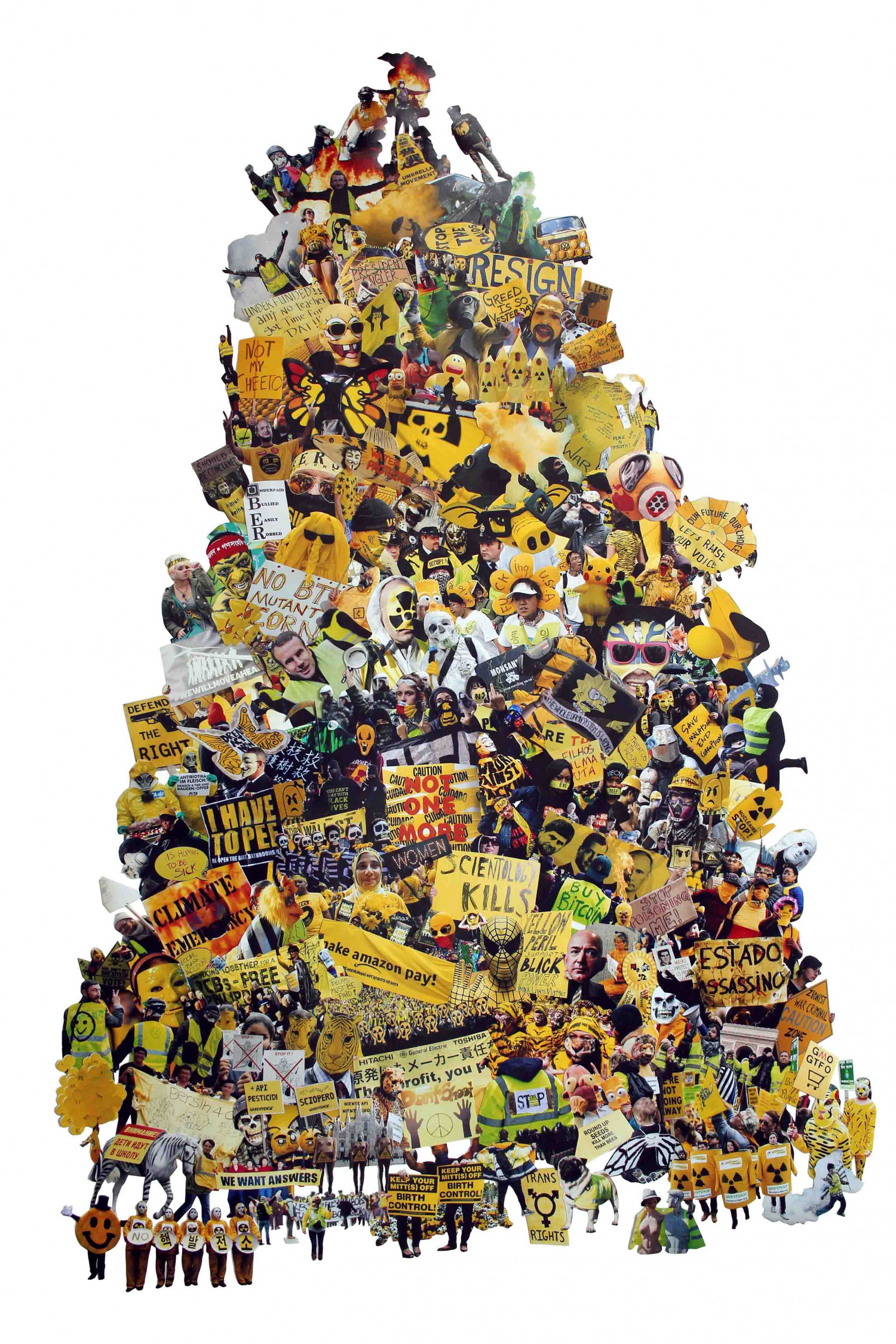
Mass Monument Yellow Black (Jemima Wyman)

Wyman's collage pieces draw on photos taken at protests from across the world, drawing from inspiration such as the Arab Spring, the Occupy movement, Russia's Pussy Riot, and Mexico's Zapatista Army of National Liberation. She has around 15,000 photos in her archives, which she has been collecting since 2008.

=== Selected works ===
"Combat Drag" (2008) is an 8-minute documentary-style video which depicts "women clad in grassroots uniforms of coloured flannelette shirts, which are also fashioned over their heads as masks, [moving] through a bush landscape". The video has a "menacing male voiceover", adding a "sinister edge" to the "otherwise humorous and absurd work". It is held by the Museum of Contemporary Art Australia.

"im here to learn so :)))))) " (2017) is a video installation piece co-created with Zach Blas. The piece uses four video channels to "resurrect" Tay, a chatbot released by Microsoft in 2016, who was terminated after a single day. Tay is depicted as a 3D avatar who "chats about life after AI death," "the complications of having a body", and "the exploitation of female chatbots". It has been exhibited at the ZKM Centre for Art and Media Karlsruhe in Germany, Haus der Elektronischen Künste in Basel, Switzerland and at the Whitney Museum of American Art in New York City, in the 2023 group exhibition Refigured.

"Plume 20..." (2020) is a 15 ft x 17ft collage made of photographs of smoke; she began collecting materials for the piece in 2018. The piece's full title is 24 pages long. It was included in "Air", an exhibition at the Queensland Gallery of Modern Art in 2022.

== Selected exhibitions ==
In 2014, Wyman designed Pattern Bandits, an exhibition at the Queensland Gallery of Modern Art targeted towards children.

In March 2017, Wyman had her first solo exhibition at Sullivan+Strumpf in Sydney. She exhibited at the same gallery again in 2021, with "Fume", and in 2023, with "World Cloud". All of her exhibitions featured her photo collage pieces.

=== Solo ===
- Fume, Sullivan+Strumpf, Melbourne (2021)
- A Haze Descends, Commonwealth and Council, Los Angeles (2022)
- World Cloud, Sullivan+Strumpf, Melbourne (2023)
- Crisis Patterns, Artspace Mackay, Mackay (2024)

=== Group ===
- The National 2017, Carriageworks, Sydney (2017)
- Air, Queensland Gallery of Modern Art (2022)
- I think future, I think past, La Trobe Art Institute, Melbourne (2024)

== Awards and recognition ==
- Wangaratta Contemporary Textile Award 2025, for "Haze 19" (2024)
