= 2012 Cultural Olympiad =

The 2012 Cultural Olympiad was a programme of cultural events across the United Kingdom that accompanied the 2012 Summer Olympics and 2012 Summer Paralympics. It included 500 events nationwide throughout the UK, spread over four years and culminating in the London 2012 Festival. The Cultural Olympiad's programmes included: Artists Taking the Lead, Discovering Places, Film Nation: Shorts, New Music 20x12, Stories of the World, World Shakespeare Festival, and the BT River of Music.

== Background ==
The Olympic Charter, the set of rules and guidelines for the organization of the Olympic Games and for governing the Olympic Movement states that

"The LOCOG shall organise a programme of cultural events which must cover at least the entire period during which the Olympic Village is open."

== London 2012 Festival ==
The London Olympic Games' Cultural Olympiad included 500 events nationwide throughout the UK, spread over four years and culminating in the London 2012 Festival. The cost of the events was over £97 million with funding provided by Arts Council England, Legacy Trust UK and the Olympic Lottery Distributor.

Those involved in the festival, which ran from 21 June to 9 September 2012, included Oscar-winning actress Cate Blanchett, director Mike Leigh, musician Damon Albarn, artists David Hockney, Lucian Freud, Rachel Whiteread, and writer Toni Morrison.

Twelve British artists were commissioned to design posters for the games: Martin Creed, Bridget Riley, Rachel Whiteread, Chris Ofili, Tracey Emin, Bob and Roberta Smith, Anthea Hamilton, Fiona Banner, Michael Craig-Martin, Gary Hume, Sarah Morris and Howard Hodgkin.

The Cultural Olympiad comprised a number of programmes including: Artists Taking the Lead, Discovering Places, Film Nation: Shorts, New Music 20x12, Stories of the World, World Shakespeare Festival. Many of these involved public participation; for example, Discovering Places encouraged people to explore their local environment and identify 2012 species, Film Nation was aimed at young people making short films, and Stories of the World involved young people working with 50 museums across the UK.

Numerous fringe projects took place around the Cultural Olympiad. Notably Timothy Ellis (for Hybrid Arts) project Extraordinary Cycles, which saw the pairing of choreographer Junior Cunningham (Motionhouse) with Flatland BMX Champion Keelan Phillips. Flatland riding was seen by Ellis as 'dancing on a bike' - a graceful, daring routine of moves balanced upon a BMX cycle that takes place without the rider touching the ground. The trio devised a new choreography for Flatland as a pilot for a larger project, which sadly wasn't then fully funded. The project did however earn Ellis the accolade of Arts Champion.

The Bandstand Marathon on 9 September 2012 was the closing event of the London 2012 Festival, and saw live music events take place at more than 200 locations across the UK. Participating bands were invited by Coldplay to perform their 2008 single "Viva La Vida" simultaneously at 2pm to celebrate the end of the games.

== Artists taking the lead ==
Artists taking the lead consisted of 12 major Arts Council funded public art projects one for each of 12 UK regions. Each project received £500,000 funding.

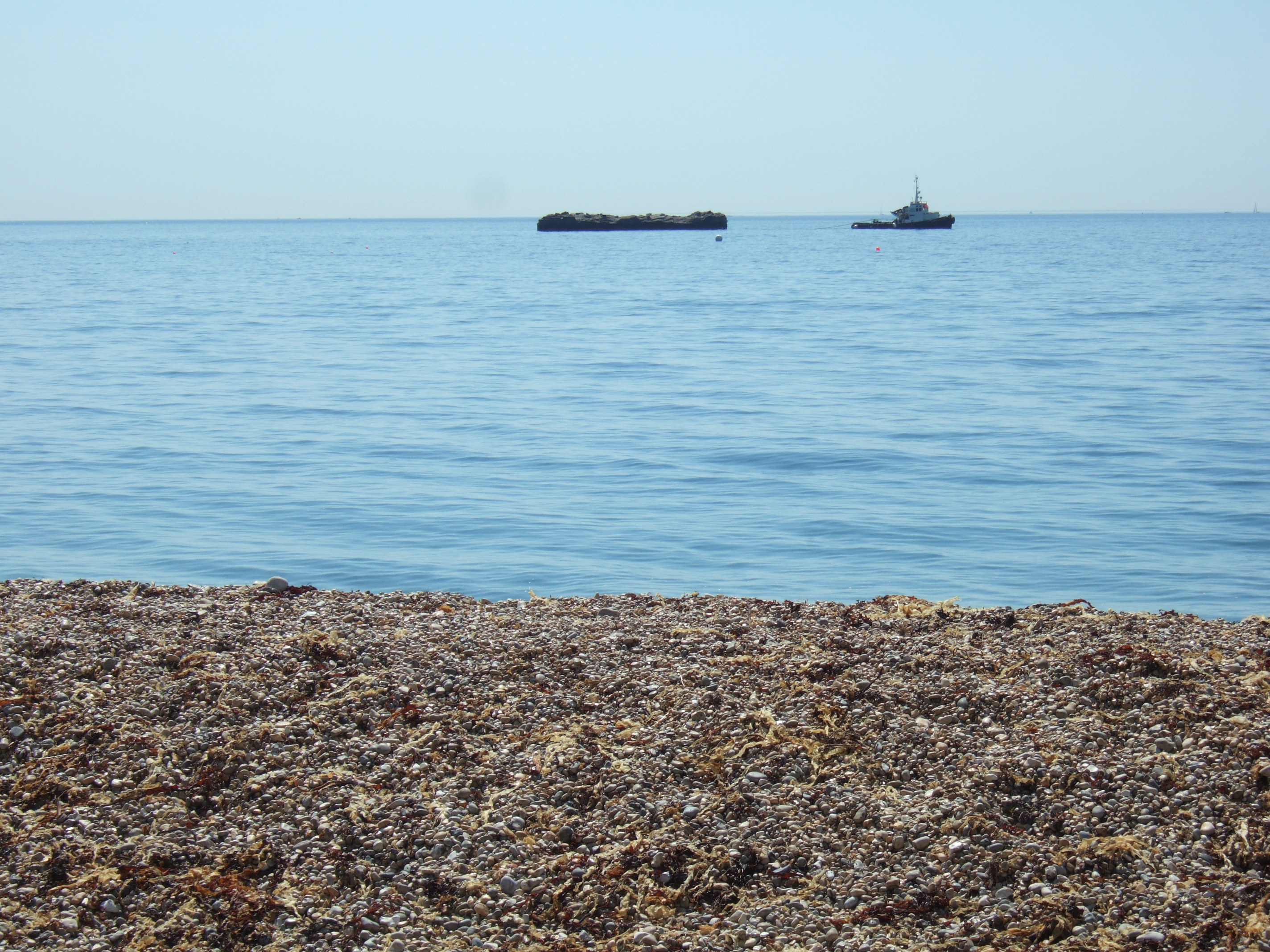
Nowhereisland by Alex Hartley being towed to Weymouth Bay, 25 July 2012.

Region	Project	Artist	Details
East	On Landguard Point	Pacitti Company	A series of outdoor events, forming a community feature film
East Midlands	Lionheart Project	Shauna Richardson	Three giant hand-crocheted lions recreating Richard the Lionheart's three lions crest
London	Bus-Tops	Alfie Dennen and Paula Le Dieu	30 LED screens on the roofs of bus shelters displaying works created by the public
North East	~Flow	Owl Project and Ed Carter	Electro-acoustic musical machinery powered by the River Tyne
North West	Column	Anthony McCall	A 100m vertical column of steam [not realised]
South East	Boat Project	Gregg Whelan, Gary Winters	A 30 ft vessel made from donated wooden items
South West	Nowhereisland	Alex Hartley	A floating island nation
West Midlands	Godiva Awakes	Imagineer Productions	A 10-metre-high carnival puppet of Lady Godiva
Yorkshire	Leeds Canvas	Brothers Quay	Overworlds and Underworlds, a month-long series of interventions and art ambushes with film, music and movement
Scunthorpe	Cycle Song Opera	Proper Job Theatre Company	Outdoor opera starring Richard Stuart, celebrating Scunthorpe's olympic cycling hero, Lal White
Northern Ireland	Nest	Brian Irvine, John McIlduff	A creation made from donated objects and a large-scale music and choral event
Scotland	Forest Pitch	Craig Coulthard	A full size football pitch hidden within a forest
Wales	Adain Avion	Marc Rees	A mobile art space created from the wreckage of a DC-9 airplane

== Paralympic Cultural Festival – Unlimited ==
Alongside the 2012 Summer Paralympics, the Paralympic Cultural Festival (or Unlimited Festival) brought hundreds of deaf and disabled artists together, and Unlimited featured 29 new commissions, including artist Sue Austin's film documenting her performances in a self-propelled underwater wheelchair, and Paul Cummins' 'English Flower Garden'. Ticketed events were held at the Southbank Centre, as part of the London 2012 Festival, featuring the debut performance from the Paraorchestra.

The place widely regarded as an inspiration for the modern Olympic games, Much Wenlock, also featured with a May Day event called M21: From the Medieval to the 21st Century in collaboration with DASH (Disability Arts in Shropshire); artists included Simon McKeown.

The Unlimited commissions drew much mass-media and popular attention, as did the 2012 Summer Paralympics opening ceremony called Enlightenment, featuring Stephen Hawking.

== New Music 20x12 ==
New musical works commissioned from 20 composers performed around the UK and at the Southbank Centre, London. Artists included Howard Skempton, Mark-Anthony Turnage, Irene Taylor Trust, Luke Carver Goss, Joe Cutler, Graham Fitkin, Mark Prescott, David Bruce, Aidan O'Rourke, Emily Howard, Conor Mitchell, Sheema Mukherjee, Michael Wolters; Oliver Searle, Aaron Cassidy, EXAUDI, Richard Causton and Jason Yarde and Wonderbrass.

== World Shakespeare Festival ==
Most of the programming was part of a strand titled the World Shakespeare Festival, which included translations, adaptations, and re-workings of Shakespeare's plays. Programming themed around the plays of William Shakespeare was a major part of the London 2012 Festival. It was produced by the Royal Shakespeare Company and sponsored by the Arts Council, BP and Lottery with about 60 participating organisations including the BBC, British Museum, National Theatre, the Barbican Centre, the Almeida Theatre and Shakespeare's Globe. This festival began on 23 April 2012 and finished in November 2012. It included approximately 70 productions related to Shakespeare's plays, over half of which were performed in a language other than English (particularly those which formed part of the Globe to Globe Festival at Shakespeare's Globe). Shakespeare also featured in the BBC's "Shakespeare Unlocked" 2012 season (particularly The Hollow Crown and in the 2012 Summer Olympics opening ceremony. The World Shakespeare Festival also included the Worlds Together Conference, an international interdisciplinary conference exploring the role of Shakespeare and arts learning in young people's lives. At the grass roots and with the support of the performers' union, Equity, many events occurred around the country, not least the première of a new play entitled Shakespeare's Queen Elizabeth the Second, which was also performed in Stratford-upon-Avon and open air celebration of Shakespeare in, literally, John O'Groats and many locations south. Equity-backed events also occurred in London, for young people and school children, every two months from 2010 to 2012.

== Poetry Parnassus ==
Poetry Parnassus was a week-long series of events at the Southbank Centre at the end of June, featuring poets from around the world in what has been described as "the biggest gathering of poets in world history", with one poet representing each of the 204 competing Olympic nations. Led by artist-in-residence Simon Armitage, it was a festival of readings, performance, and debate that attracted an audience of more than 13,000 people. The opening ceremony for the event included a Rain of Poems where 100,000 English translations of the 204 poets' poems were dropped from a helicopter.

== Tales from the Bridge ==
Tales from the Bridge was a vast poetry soundscape (among the largest ever created) commissioned by the Mayor of London for the 2012 Cultural Olympiad. The project was "installed for eight weeks along the entire length of the Millennium Bridge and experienced by an estimated four million people". Collaborators for the project included Martyn Ware (The Human League) and Eric Whitacre, whose composition prefaces the piece. The flowing narrative of the main section drew on "the fascinating history of the Thames and the people, stories, life and times on both banks of the river", providing "a contemplative auditory platform that links the City of London in the north with the Southbank and vice versa". Composed as a complex overlapping hybrid prose poem, and performed using subtle sonic textures and multiple interleaving voices, the text was conceived, written and vocally choreographed by Mario Petrucci. The project was shortlisted for the 2012 Ted Hughes Award.

== BT River of Music ==
The BT River of Music was a series of free events, with music from every country participating in the Olympics performed on five stages down the Thames. There were artists from 204 countries who performed six concerts. The stages were located as follows:

- Asia Stage, Battersea Park
- Europe Stages, Trafalgar Square and Battersea Park
- Americas Stage, Tower of London
- Oceania Stage, Old Royal Naval College, Greenwich
- Africa Stage, London Pleasure Gardens

The Oceania Stage featured music from the Pacific region, including a special commission from in Indigenous Australian theatre company The Black Arm Band as well as Wantok's SingSing. Aboriginal Australian musician Frank Yamma also gave a performance.

Other performers included: Scissor Sisters, Staff Benda Bilili, the Noisettes, Matthew Herbert, Penguin Cafe Orchestra, Roberto Fonseca, Beverley Knight, Mariza, King Sunny Adé, Angélique Kidjo, Baaba Maal, Markitos Mikolta, Quantic, La Bottine Souriante, and many others.

== See also ==
- All The Bells
- See No Evil (artwork)
