= Unlimited (arts initiative) =

Commissioning programme

Unlimited is a commissioning programme that celebrates the work of deaf and disabled artists, originally conceived for by Arts Council England for the London 2012 Cultural Olympiad. Since its inception, the programme represents a multi-million pound investment which to date has commissioned more than 70 pieces of work across theatre, dance, visual art, music, literature, film, poetry and performance art. Several Unlimited-commissioned pieces have gone on to have a global reach, such as Sue Austin's Creating the Spectacle, which has reportedly been seen by more than 150 million people worldwide. Others have won critical and industry acclaim within their field, such as Touretteshero's Backstage in Biscuit Land, which earned the company the 2014 Total Theatre Award for Best Emerging Company. Unlimited is currently delivered in partnership between Shape Arts and Artsadmin with senior producer Jo Verrent.

== History ==
In 2012 the programme was funded by the Olympic Lottery Distributor, and was delivered in partnership between London 2012, Arts Council England, Creative Scotland, Arts Council of Wales, Arts Council of Northern Ireland and the British Council. It was the first time the UK's four arts councils had collaborated with the British Council to commission new work. The British Council supported "five UK international collaborations with artists from seven countries which premiered in: Birmingham, Cambridge, Liverpool, Newcastle and Weymouth prior to a major showcase during the Paralympics" London-based disability-led arts organisation, Shape was contracted to support the 29 commissioned artists through the programme. This programme culminated at the inaugural Unlimited Festival at London's Southbank Centre in September 2012.

The Unlimited programme (2014–16) "offers commissions to disabled artists to develop, produce and show ambitious and high quality work, with mentoring support. The programme includes biennial festivals at Southbank Centre (2014 and 2016) and the opportunity for artists to showcase their work across the country through partnerships with venues and organisations." Unlimited is currently delivered in partnership by Shape and Artsadmin, with funding from Arts Council England, Creative Scotland, Arts Council of Wales and Spirit of 2012. Key partners include British Council, DaDaFest, Southbank Centre, and Tramway. Since 2012, Disability Arts Online has been the official media partner for the festival, tasked with documenting the work produced in the form of journalism.

Arts Council England have announced £1.8 million funding for a continuation of the Unlimited programme including festivals in 2018 and 2020.

== Commissions ==
The primary purpose of the Unlimited programme is to commission new work by disabled artists and get it seen by as wide an audience as possible. Funding for commissions has so far come in three tranches. The first (Unlimited) which ran from 2010 to 2012, was a commissioning pot for work around the London 2012 Paralympics, with work being shown around the UK and at the first Unlimited Festival at Southbank Centre. The second (Unlimited II) covered the years 2013–2016 with work presented at various venues across the UK, culminating at the Unlimited Festivals in 2014 and 2016, again at Southbank Centre and for 2016, also at Glasgow's Tramway. The third (Unlimited III) will cover the period 2017–2020, which will include a greater focus on international collaborations and will encompass works which will be shown at Unlimited Festivals in 2018 and 2020.

== Unlimited Festivals ==
The Unlimited Festivals are biennial events, the first of which was held in 2012 to coincide with the Paralympic Games. Unlimited Festival 2012 was held at London's Southbank Centre from 30 August - 9 September 2012. The Unlimited Festival attracted live audiences of 20,000 people at ticketed and free events and engaged with an estimated 11,000 people through digital media. In 2013, when the Unlimited commissioning programme was taken on by Shape and Artsadmin, the relationship between the commissioning body and the festival changed; Southbank Centre would take responsibility for the festival, whilst Shape and Artsadmin would administer the commissioning programme. The festival would continue to act as a showcase event for the work commissioned by the programme, but other work by disabled artists would also feature alongside the Unlimited-commissioned work. The Southbank Centre hosted the second Unlimited Festival from 2–9 September 2014. Unlimited 2016 marked the first time that the festival went to a venue other than Southbank Centre. The festival took place at the Southbank Centre from 6–11 September, before Tramway in Glasgow hosted their own version of the festival from 15 to 25 September. Arts Council England has committed funding for future festivals in 2018 and 2020.

== Unlimited Impact ==
Unlimited Impact focuses on developing and inspiring the next generation of young disabled people passionate about making change through the arts; extending Unlimited's reach by supporting venues across the country to successfully programme ambitious and high quality work by disabled artists; and deepening discussion and debate around work by disabled artists.

Unlimited Impact projects include:

- Your Slogan Here: a competition creating T-shirts with slogans by young disabled people.
- No Strings Attached: working with Farnham Maltings to ensure disabled young people felt able and supported to apply – resulting in 3 of the 7 awards being made to young disabled artists
- How to be Creative with Words: delivered with DaDaFest, a Creative Writing project enabling young disabled people to express themselves through poetry.
- The Ideas Amplifier: Supporting Touretteshero to run The Ideas Amplifier at Roundhouse, giving six young creative people with Tourettes syndrome the opportunity to think about the changes they’d like to see in their life and imagine creative ways to make them happen.
- Auditing Brighton Dome and Festival in relation to programming and marketing and supporting an increase in accessible performances and associated research.
- Access audit and investment in improvements at Summerhall, Edinburgh

== Unlimited International ==
Announced in 2016, Unlimited International is a 3-year programme that exists primarily to fund international collaborations between disabled artists/companies from England and those from around the world, enabling a global exchange of practice.

The first collaborations announced were:

- Pallant House Gallery is working with Atelier Corners from Japan to exhibit the visual art work of three of their group: Koji Nishioka, Makoto Ohkawa and Yasuyuki Ueno across the summer and autumn 2016
- Drake Music will work with Brazilian rapper Billy Saga, arranging performances and workshops throughout England in September 2016
- Watershed will work with Unlimited and ANAT in Australia to profile an event focusing on UNFIXED – a process exploring disability, technology and art.

Further international collaborations were announced as part of 2017 commissions announcement (see above).
