= Alex Hartley =

Alex Hartley can refer to:

- Alex Hartley (artist) (born 1963), British artist
- Alex Hartley (cricketer) (born 1993), English cricketer
