= Neo-conceptual art =

Art movement

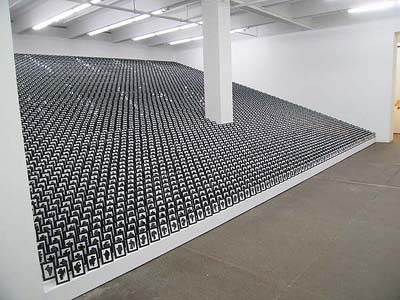
The Shapes Project by artist Allan McCollum

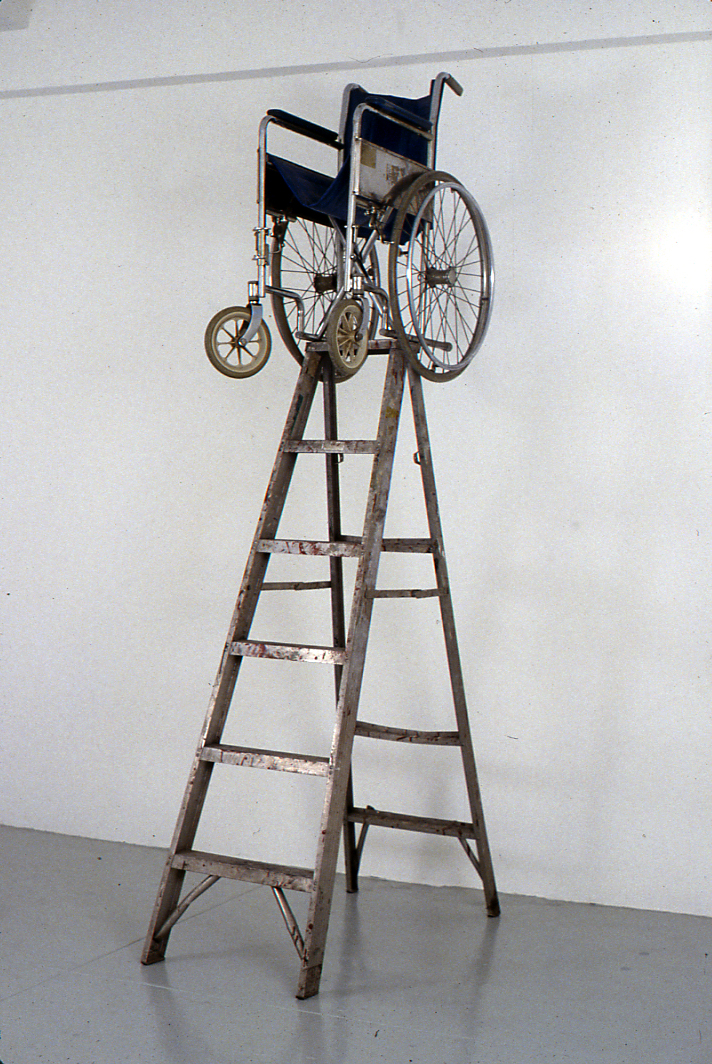
John LeKay Untitled, 1991, ladder and wheelchair

Neo-conceptual art describes art practices in the 1980s and 1990s that emerged from the conceptual art movement of the 1960s and 1970s. These subsequent initiatives included the Moscow Conceptualists, the United States Neo-Conceptual artists, such as Sherrie Levine, and the Young British Artists, such as Damien Hirst.

== History ==
Many of the concerns of the "conceptual art" movement proper have been taken up by contemporary artists since the initial wave of conceptual artists. While many of these artists may not term themselves "conceptual artists", ideas such as anti-commodification, social and/or political critique, digital art, and ideas/information as medium continue to be aspects of contemporary art, especially among artists working with computer art, installation art, performance art, net.art and electronic art. Many critics and artists may speak of conceptual aspects of a given artist or art work, reflecting the enduring influence that many of the original conceptual artists have had on the art world.

== New York City ==
The idea of neo-conceptual art (sometimes later termed post-conceptual art) in the United States was clearly articulated by Tricia Collins and Richard Milazzo (working as a team called Collins & Milazzo) in the early and mid 1980s in New York City, when they brought to prominence a whole new generation of artists through their copious writings and curatorial activity. It was their exhibitions and writings that originally fashioned the theoretical context for a new kind of neo (or post) conceptual art; one that argued simultaneously against Neo-Expressionism and Picture-Theory Art. It was through this context that the work of many of the artists associated with Neo-Conceptualism (or what some of the critics reductively called “Simulationism” and “Neo Geo”) was first brought together: artists such as Ross Bleckner, James Welling, Steven Parrino, Richard Prince, Peter Nagy, Joseph Nechvatal, Sarah Charlesworth, Mark Innerst, Allan McCollum, Peter Halley, Jonathan Lasker, Haim Steinbach, Philip Taaffe, Robert Gober and Saint Clair Cemin.

== Moscow ==
The Moscow Conceptualists, in the 1970s and 80s, attempted to subvert socialist ideology using the strategies of conceptual art and appropriation art. The central figures were Ilya Kabakov and Komar and Melamid. The group also included Eric Bulatov and Viktor Pivovarov.

== London ==
The Young British Artists (YBAs), led by Damien Hirst, came to prominence in the 1990s and their work was described at the time as neo-conceptual, even though it relies very heavily on the art object to make its impact. The term is used in relation to them on the basis that the object is not the artwork, or is often a found object, which has not needed artistic skill in its production. Tracey Emin is seen as a leading YBA and a neo-conceptualist, even though she has denied that she is and has emphasised personal emotional expression. Charles Harrison, a member of the conceptual art group Art and Language in the 1970s, criticizes the neo-conceptual art of the 1990s as conceptual art "without threat or awkwardness" and a "vacant" prospect. Other notable artists associated with neo-conceptualism in the UK include Martin Creed, Liam Gillick, Bethan Huws, Simon Patterson, Simon Starling and Douglas Gordon.

== Notable events ==
Work No. 227: The lights going on and off by Martin Creed, (2001) .gif recording of titular event.

1991: Charles Saatchi funds Damien Hirst and the next year in the Saatchi Gallery exhibits his The Physical Impossibility of Death in the Mind of Someone Living, a shark in formaldehyde in a vitrine.

1993: Vanessa Beecroft holds her first performance in Milan, Italy, using models to act as a second audience to the display of her diary of food.

1999: Tracey Emin is nominated for the Turner Prize. Part of her exhibit is My Bed, her dishevelled bed, surrounded by detritus such as condoms, blood-stained knickers, bottles and her bedroom slippers.

2001: Martin Creed wins the Turner Prize for Work No. 227: The lights going on and off, an empty room where the lights go on and off.

2005: Simon Starling wins the Turner Prize for Shedboatshed, a wooden shed which he had turned into a boat, floated down the Rhine and turned back into a shed again.

== Controversy in the UK ==
In Britain, the rise to prominence of the Young British Artists (YBAs) after the 1988 Freeze show, curated by Damien Hirst, and subsequent promotion of the group by the Saatchi Gallery during the 1990s, generated a media backlash, where the phrases "conceptual art" and "neo-conceptual" came to be terms of derision applied to much contemporary art. This was amplified by the Turner Prize whose more extreme nominees (most notably Hirst and Emin) caused a controversy annually.

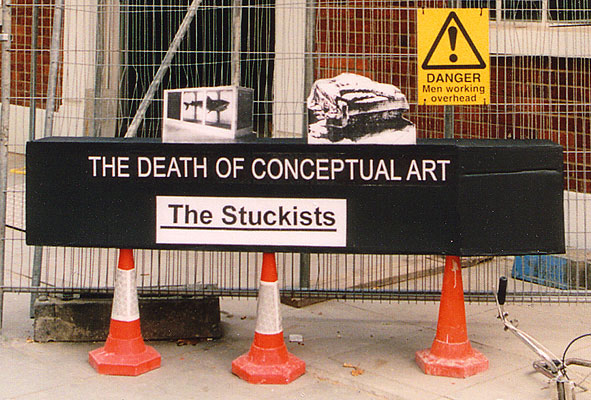
Stuckists' "Death of Conceptual Art" coffin demonstration, 2002

The Stuckist group of artists, founded in 1999, proclaimed themselves "pro-contemporary figurative painting with ideas and anti-conceptual art, mainly because of its lack of concepts." They also called it pretentious, "unremarkable and boring" and on 25 July 2002 deposited a coffin outside the White Cube gallery, marked "The Death of Conceptual Art". They staged yearly demonstrations outside the Turner Prize.

In 2002, Ivan Massow, the Chairman of the Institute of Contemporary Arts branded conceptual art "pretentious, self-indulgent, craftless tat" and in "danger of disappearing up its own arse ... led by cultural tsars such as the Tate's Sir Nicholas Serota. Massow was consequently forced to resign. At the end of the year, the Culture Minister, Kim Howells (an art school graduate) denounced the Turner Prize as "cold, mechanical, conceptual bullshit".

In October 2004 the Saatchi Gallery told the media that "painting continues to be the most relevant and vital way that artists choose to communicate." Following this Charles Saatchi began to sell prominent works from his YBA collection.

== See also ==
- Appropriation art
- Artificial intelligence art
- Computer art
- Cyberarts
- Electronic art
- Generative art
- Interactive film
- Internet art
- Institutional Critique
- New media
- New media art
- Postmodern art
- Superflat
- Superstroke
- Systems art
