= Nyskjeret =

Island in Svalbard, Norway

Coordinates: 78°42′25″N 20°30′23″E

Nyskjeret (Norwegian: 'new skerry') is a small island, approximately the size of a football field, in the Arctic archipelago of Svalbard, a Norwegian territory in the Barents Sea, 500 miles from the mainland. It emerged during the 1990s from the now melted portion of a retreating glacier. It was discovered in 2004 by the British artist Alex Hartley, who named it Nymark ('new ground') and in 2012 exhibited a portion of it as Nowhereisland.

The emerging island was observed on satellite images as early as 1998. Alex Hartley came upon it in 2004 during a Cape Farewell expedition of scientists and artists, collaborating on a cultural response to global warming and the diminishing Arctic ice pack. He made a claim of ownership and applied to the Name Committee for Norwegian Polar Regions to register the island under the name Nymark, saying that he planned to create a micro-nation there. The claim and name were rejected, and the island was given the name Nyskjeret.

The Cape Farewell expedition documented the island with a wall exhibit including framed rock samples, letters, maps and photographs as part of Cape Farewell - Art and Climate Change, which appeared in the National Conservation Centre in Liverpool as part of the 2006 Liverpool Biennial.

As part of the London 2012 Cultural Olympiad and with permission of the Governor of Svalbard, Hartley removed some rocks from the island and toured a floating model of it incorporating them round the South West coast of England as Nowhereisland. Visitors were encouraged to sign up for free citizenship and discuss what policies the "nation" should have. The project was also intended to provoke thought about borders and about global warming.
