= Ilog =

Ilog means river in Filipino, and is the name of two places in the Philippines:

- Ilog, Negros Occidental
- Ilog, a barangay in Taal, Batangas

Others

- ILOG, a software company that makes products including JRules.
- iLog is a hand held wooden log like electronic instrument made by the Owl Project, and artist collaboration from the UK.
