= United Congress =

Castration of St. Paul Poster

The United Congress is a long-standing artist collective active in Calgary, Alberta from the late 1980s to the present day. The group combines conceptual art, silkscreen, music, constructed language, abstraction, and anti-art in its activities.

Alberta visual artist and original Congress member Lisa Brawn describes the group as "interested in dadaist instigation, politics, intense productivity, anonymity and relentless propagandizing”.

== Beginnings ==
The United Congress was formed in 1988 at the Alberta College of Art and Design, by White-Field Senate, who is the group's longest-standing member. Membership in the collective was loosely knit and fluid. Earliest collective members were White-Field Senate, Lisa Brawn, Doug Nachtigall, Catherine Fisher, Elmer Xavier and Richard F.

Milo Dlouhy, Conroy Nachtigall, Kenneth Doren and Richard Cole also made contributions to the United Congress in its early days, and Dlouhy and Doren continued to be involved in Collective projects.

Yuriko Iga, one-time director of Blim Gallery in Vancouver, also contributed to the United Congress' later projects in Calgary.

== Early Projects ==
=== The House of Israel ===
The House of Israel was an art event held in response to the vandalism of a former downtown Calgary Synagogue by members of the Final Solution Skinhead', who covered the front of the building with white supremacist graffiti in November 1989. The show made statements opposing racist and anti-Semitic violence in Calgary, using music and visual art. The House of Israel show was set up shortly after the vandalism, at ACAD.

=== The Castration of St. Paul ===
The Congress' most notable public show was The Castration of St. Paul, at the Nickle Arts Museum on the University of Calgary campus in February/March 1991. Castration was intended to critique what The United Congress called the patriarchal nature of Christianity, and the show created "a virulent reaction" in the local press. Castration featured thirty low-resolution colour xerox enlargements of Polaroid photographs of naked male torsos. Each enlargement was carefully framed and labeled with the name of a historic Christian religious figure, including the twelve Apostles, seven Old Testament Prophets, five early Christian Saints, the Trinity, John the Baptist, Martin Luther, and Pope John Paul II. Also part of the exhibit was a public lounge area featuring select pamphlets and literature promoting Christian organizations who espoused 'traditional values' which the collective considered to be encouraging the subordination of females in family and public life.

=== Other projects ===
Early collective member Lisa Brawn describes the UC of the 1980s and early 1990s as producing "rapid-fire shows using video surveillance, nets, creamed marshmallow and red packing tape" and she jokes that the Congress took over the Alberta College of Art and Design "(l)ike a parasitic infestation."

This period was very active for the United Congress, who assembled numerous shows on a variety of themes, including March 1989's One Hundred Pounds of Pretty Girls, God Save the Queen in April, 1989 at the Marion Nicholl Gallery, Montreal at the Illingworth-Kerr Gallery in 1992, as well as CNIB, Recent Video Art by the United Congress (which contained no video art), The Sacred Shroud of Turin, and Our Ladies of Soul Sister. Each show was promoted by a run of hand-silkscreened posters distributed throughout the city.

The United Congress also collaborated with community groups to produce hand-screened posters for events such as Women Looking Forward's 1989 International Women's Day celebrations, and with the Calgary Jewish Centre for their multimedia presentation The Farthest Horizon: 100 years of Jewish Life in Alberta.

== Publications ==
=== Daisy Gets Erotik ===
This collective also took on the publication of the ACAD Magazine, and in Oct 1989 the first issue of Daisy Gets Erotik was hand silk-screened and made available. "Daisy" was considered controversial as an official student newspaper, as it featured nudity. Publication ceased after three issues.

=== Development of ISU ===
In the early 1990s, UC founder White-Field Senate developed a constructed language inspired by Dutton Speedwords. Called ISU (short for 'In Stat Ua' or 'International Language'), the developed language attempted to root out perceived inherent biases (such as gender hierarchies) in existing world languages. In 1996, the United Congress published a book on the topic: ISU: THE NEW WORLD LANGUAGE.

== Later Projects ==
=== United Missions ===
The United Congress collective briefly changed its name to United Missions in the mid-1990s, and for the 1997 Calgary ArtWeek Gala Bacchanal, presented Golden Boy, a show based on the personal artifacts of Rafael Albert, a Victorian cyclist.

=== Comme des Congres ===
In 1999, Richard F of The United Congress opened its Calgary street-front gallery, the Comme des Congres. The gallery hosted several shows, notably Alberto Guedea's Re:<o><o>, "an investigation of art creation using electronic mail as a tool", Hurting, and Self-Maintenance, which featured artist Carl Chapel George publicly attending to details of his personal hygiene, such as brushing his teeth, clipping his nails, plucking his eyebrows and ironing his clothes in view of gallery visitors and street-level passers by.

== Related Projects ==
=== Colour For Industry ===
Sometime-United Congress-members Kenneth Doren, Conroy Nachtigall, Yuriko Iga, and Richard F work together occasionally in a different Calgary Artist collective. Colour For Industry combines digital opera, audio art, experimental music, modern dance and fabric arts to create works like Doren's celebrated Allegro Molto Con Brio King Kong, a 1999 Digital Opera focused on pop culture connections to the Greek myth of Prometheus whose performance incorporated a string quintet, three dancers and video monitors.

=== Sugar Estate Art Salon ===
Former Congress members Milo Dlouhy and Lisa Brawn collaborated on the Sugar Estate Art Salon Tea Room and Museum of Oddities, which existed from 2003 to 2004. The Salon "was formed to create an exquisite environment for interdisciplinary art exhibitions, performances, installations, etc."in Calgary.

== See also ==
- Appropriation (art)
- Art intervention
- Conceptual art
- Found object
- Modern art
- Neo-conceptual art
- Performance art
