= Craig Reedie =

British sports administrator (1941–2026)

Sir Craig Reedie GBE

3rd President of WADA
- In office 1 January 2014 – 31 December 2019
- Vice President: Linda Cathrine Hofstad Helleland
- Preceded by: John Fahey
- Succeeded by: Witold Bańka

Chairman of the British Olympic Association
- In office 1992–2005
- Preceded by: Sir Arthur Gold
- Succeeded by: The Lord Moynihan

Vice-President of the International Olympic Committee
- In office July 2012 – November 2016

Personal details
- Born: Craig Collins Reedie; 6 May 1941 Stirling, Scotland
- Died: 5 April 2026 (aged 84) Beaulieu, Hampshire, England

Sir Craig Collins Reedie (6 May 1941 – 5 April 2026) was a British sports administrator, noteworthy for his tenure as the president of the World Anti-Doping Agency, a onetime chairman of the British Olympic Association (1992–2005) and a vice-president of, and a serving representative on, the International Olympic Committee.

== Background ==
Reedie was born in Stirling, Scotland on 6 May 1941. He was educated at Stirling High School, a comprehensive state school, and the University of Glasgow. He gained his Master of Arts (MA) in 1962 and then studied for a Bachelor of Laws (LLB) degree in 1964, still at the University of Glasgow.

In his professional career, Reedie was a partner in a Scottish independent financial advisory company.

He was married and had two children. He had a home in his native Scotland. Reedie died on 5 April 2026, Beaulieu, England, while on an Easter holiday. He was 84.

== Sports administration ==
In his sporting life, Reedie gained success playing badminton from 1962 to 1970, culminating in his becoming a doubles champion. At the time, badminton was not recognised as an Olympic sport, a situation his influence was able to remedy in 1985, leading to the first medals being awarded at the 1992 Summer Olympics.

After his success as a player, Reedie turned his efforts towards sports administration and from 1981 to 1984 he was President of the International Badminton Federation (IBF). In 1992, he became the Chairman of the British Olympic Association (BOA), serving in that capacity for more than a decade, and for which role he was knighted upon the occasion of his retirement in 2005. In 1994, in addition to his British role, Reedie joined the International Olympic Committee (IOC), where at the time of his death in 2026 he was one of four United Kingdom representatives, the others being the Princess Royal, Sir Philip Craven and Adam Pengilly.

In addition to his post on the IOC, Reedie was also on the board of the London 2012 Organising Committee, the body which was tasked with preparations for the 2012 Summer Olympics that were held in London. He was also appointed to the Board of the Olympic Lottery Distributor in 2006. Reedie also served on the Evaluation Commission for the bids for the 2016 Summer Olympics which was won by Rio de Janeiro. He also led the Evaluation Commission for the 2020 Summer Olympics that were awarded to Tokyo over Istanbul and Madrid, the three remaining cities on a shortlist that previously included Baku, Doha and Rome.

On 9 October 2009, at the 121st IOC Session in Copenhagen, after two previous failed attempts, Reedie was elected to the International Olympic Committee's executive board. He is the first Briton to have a seat on the board since 1961. He became a vice-president of the IOC in July 2012.

Beyond his involvement in the Olympic movement, Reedie was involved in the World Anti-Doping Agency since its foundation in 1999, serving as the inaugural chair of WADA's Finance and Administration Committee and as a member of its executive committee and Foundation Board. In November 2013 Reedie was elected as WADA's third president, commencing his three-year term on 1 January 2014.

== Honours ==
Reedie was first appointed Commander of the Order of the British Empire (CBE) in the 1999 New Year Honours for services to sport.

In the 2006 New Year Honours he gained further recognition, with the award of a knighthood, again for services to sport, giving him the formal title of Sir Craig Reedie, CBE.

Reedie was also awarded an honorary degree by the University of Lincoln in the 2010 Graduation ceremonies.

In 2001 his life's achievements were recognised with an honorary doctorate from the University of Glasgow, and in 2005 Scotland's oldest university, the University of St Andrews made him an honorary Doctor of Law (LLD).

In the 2018 Queen's Birthday Honours, he was appointed Knight Grand Cross of the Order of the British Empire (GBE) for services to sport.
