= Shauna Richardson =

British artist

- Education: De Montfort University
- Known for: Sculpture
- Website: shaunarichardson.com

Shauna Richardson is a Norfolk-based artist who makes sculptures using crochet, a process she calls "crochetdermy". Her work has been exhibited in the Saatchi Gallery, The Natural History Museum and Victoria & Albert London.

Richardson studied fine art at De Montfort University Leicester. A large bear was the first piece she created in 2007 and took about 8 months to make.

Between 2010 and 2012 Richardson created the largest single-handed crochet sculpture in the world, three 25 ft lions for the Lionheart Project commissioned by the 2012 Cultural Olympiad to mark the 2012 Summer Olympics.

In 2014 her BOJO portrait of Boris Johnson as a gorilla was displayed at the Chelsea Flower Show. Her work sells for up to £20,000.
