= All the Bells =

All The Bells is a 2006 and 2012 artwork by Martin Creed.

== Original work ==
The work was originally given in San Juan, Puerto Rico, in October 2006, where it attracted little favourable attention. Its rubric was: All of the bells in a city or town rung as quickly and loudly as possible for three minutes (or in Spanish, Todas las campanas en una ciudad o pueblo sonando tan rápido y duro como sea posible por tres minutos). The work was a collaboration between the Candela Art & Music Festival, Escuela de Artes Plásticas, Galeríía Comercial, Gavin Brown's Enterprise, Mima and César Reyes and SunCom.

== London 2012 ==
The piece, under the title Work No. 1197: All The Bells, with the revised rubric, All the bells in a country rung as quickly and as loudly as possible for three minutes, was subsequently re-commissioned, for a sum rumoured to be between thirty-five and fifty thousand pounds, and advertised as being a new work, by the London 2012 Festival. The event was held from 8:12 to 8:15 a.m. on 27 July 2012, the day of the 2012 Summer Olympics opening ceremony. The Central Council of Church Bell Ringers declined to participate, believing that not enough planning time had been given for thousands of volunteer bell ringers to be recruited and trained, and comparing it unfavorably to the "Ring In 2000" millennium event which had been planned five years in advance and was designed to encourage a long-term interest in bell-ringing. The Council's President, Kate Flavell, criticised both the timing and content of the piece in her official blog, saying that 8:12 was too early in the morning for many churches and that church bells were not suited to being rung "as quickly and as loudly as possible".
