= Louise Hopkins =

British contemporary artist and painter (born 1965)

- Born: Louise Hopkins; Hertfordshire, England
- Education: Newcastle Polytechnic; Glasgow School of Art
- Known for: Painting, Drawing, Printmaking
- Website: louisehopkins.com

Louise Hopkins (born 1965) is a British contemporary artist and painter who lives and works in Glasgow, Scotland.

== Biography ==
Hopkins was born in Hertfordshire, England and completed the Foundations Studies course at Brighton Polytechnic from 1984 to 1985. She studied fine art at Newcastle Polytechnic between 1985 and 1988, graduating with a B.A.(Hons). For a time, after graduating from Newcastle Polytechnic, she lived and worked in Australia, where she also exhibited. After a two-year course she graduated from Glasgow School of Art with a master's degree in 1994.

Hopkins quickly gained recognition in Glasgow and London after graduating in 1994. That year she was included in a group show, New Art in Scotland in Glasgow and in a touring show, SWARM, organised by the Scottish Arts Council during 1995. In 1996 Hopkins featured in the group show New Contemporaries 96 at Tate Liverpool. She was shortlisted for the Jerwood Painting prize in 1997.

In 2002, she received a Creative Scotland Award. She held her first retrospective exhibition at the Fruitmarket Gallery in 2005 and, in 2007, she was one of six artists chosen to represent Scotland at the 52nd Venice Biennale. In 2014, she exhibited at Linlithgow Burgh Halls as part of GENERATION-25 years of Contemporary Art in Scotland.

Her work is in the collection of the Museum of Modern Art, and the National Galleries Scotland, and the Rhode Island School of Design Museum.

== Work ==
Hopkins is known for making work on the surfaces of pre-existing, and usually pre-printed, materials either with specific imagery or more generic graphic information. From this she develops painted or drawn marks as a way of engaging and transforming the surface. Found surfaces that Hopkins works onto include furnishing fabric, maps, sheet music, graph paper, photographs, pages from history books and from commercial catalogues.

"The artist has spoken of her interest in working on supports which contain information, often an image, and in turning that image into a painting by repainting and hence remaking it."

"Louise Hopkins’s world is in an endless state of flux, becoming and adjustment. Meaning for her is never something to be merely established-through research, for example, or contemplation-but rather galvanised, sparked into a state of pulsing iteration and reiteration…In an indicative work, Untitled (011), 1998, she once crumpled a piece of white paper, the kind generally used to write or type or scribble or photocopy on. She acted not in anger or frustration but to make the paper more interesting, yet not less itself. To the same end, she then used a fine pencil to draw thin parallel marks delineating the faint shadows cast by the creases. The paper’s once latent complexity was unleashed. Its pristine (artless) past remained a presence beneath the surface. Through a set of effects, both accidental and intended the blank sheet had become defined, articulated through hard-edged incident; it also continued to carry the dynamic tension of its violent collapse."
