= Collins & Milazzo exhibitions =

Series of American art exhibitions

The Collins & Milazzo exhibitions were a series of art exhibitions curated by the team Tricia Collins and Richard Milazzo, mainly in New York in the mid-1980s to early 1990s.

From 1982 to 1984 the pair founded, edited and published Effects : Magazine for New Art Theory. Drawing on their experience with the magazine, in 1984 Collins & Milazzo began working together as curators to transform the group show into a critical statement. Collins & Milazzo brought to prominence a new generation of artists in the 1980s. It was their exhibitions and writings that originally fashioned the theoretical context for a new kind of Post-conceptual art that argued simultaneously against Neo-Expressionism and the Neo-pop Picture Theory work of The Pictures Generation. It was through this context that the work of many of the artists associated with Neo-Conceptualism (or what the critics reductively called Simulationism and Neo Geo) was first brought together.

== Selected Collins & Milazzo exhibitions ==
- Civilization and the Landscape of Discontent. Gallery Nature Morte, New York, March 1984.
- Still Life With Transaction: Former Objects, New Moral Arrangements, and the History of Surfaces. International With Monument Gallery, New York, March 28 - April 21, 1984.
- Natural Genre: From the Neutral Subject to the Hypothesis of World Objects. Florida State University Gallery & Museum, Tall., Fla., Aug. 31-Sept. 30, 1984.
- Still Life With Transaction II: Former Objects, New Moral Arrangements, and the History of Surfaces. Galerie Jurka, Amsterdam, November 1984.
- The New Capital. White Columns, New York, December 4, 1984 - January 5, 1985.
- Final Love. C.A.S.H./Newhouse Gallery, New York, March 15 - April 14, 1985.
- Paravision. Postmasters Gallery, New York, May 3 - June 2, 1985.
- Persona Non Grata. Daniel Newburg Gallery, New York, September 11 - October 5, 1985.
- Cult and Decorum. Tibor De Nagy Gallery, New York, December 7, 1985 - January 4, 1986.
- Time After Time (A Sculpture Show). Diane Brown Gallery, New York, March 8 - April 2, 1986.
- Spiritual America. CEPA, Buffalo, May 3 - June 15, 1986.
- Paravision II. Margo Leavin Gallery, Los Angeles, July 12 - August 23, 1986.
- Ultrasurd. S.L. Simpson Gallery, Toronto, September 1986.
- Modern Sleep. American Fine Arts Co., New York, October 17 - November 16, 1986.
- The Antique Future. Massimo Audiello Gallery, New York, February 13 - March 15, 1987.
- Extreme Order. Lia Rumma Gallery, Naples, May - July 1987.
- The Ironic Sublime. Galerie Albrecht, Munich, June 4 - July 18, 1987.
- The New Poverty. John Gibson Gallery, New York, October 10 - November 7, 1987.
- Media Post Media. Scott Hanson Gallery, New York, January 6 - February 9, 1988.
- Off White. Diane Brown Gallery, New York, May 24 - June 18, 1988.
- Art at the End of the Social. The Rooseum, Malmö, Sweden, July - October 1988.
- Hybrid Neutral: Modes of Abstraction and the Social. I.C.I. Exhibition: University Art Gallery, The University of North Texas, Denton, Texas, August 29 - September 30, 1988; J.B. Speed Art Museum, Louisville, Kentucky, November 7, 1988 - January 2, 1989; Alberta College Gallery of Art, Calgary, Alberta, Canada, February 9 - March 9, 1989; The Contemporary Arts Center, Cincinnati, Ohio, March 31 - May 6, 1989; Richard F. Brush Art Gallery, St. Lawrence University, Canton, New York, October 12 - November 15, 1989; Santa Fe Community College Art Gallery & Museum, Gainesville, Florida, February 4 - March 18, 1990; Mendel Art Gallery & Museum, Saskatoon, Saskatchewan, Canada, July 1990.
- Primary Forms, Mediated Structures. Massimo Audiello Gallery, New York, September - October 1988.
- The New Poverty II. Meyers/Bloom Gallery, Santa Monica, California, December 3, 1988 - January 8, 1989.
- Pre-Pop Post-Appropriation. Stux Gallery, in cooperation with Leo Castelli, New York, February 3 - March 4, 1989.
- Buena Vista. John Gibson Gallery, New York, October 14 - November 11, 1989.
- The Last Laugh: Irony, Humor, Self-Mockery and Derision. Massimo Audiello Gallery, New York, January 6 - February 17, 1990.
- The Last Decade: American Artists of the ’80s. Tony Shafrazi Gallery, New York, September 15 - October 27, 1990.
- All Quiet on the Western Front? [75 Americans in Paris]. Antoine Candau, Paris, September 26 - December 31, 1990.
- Who Framed Modern Art or the Quantitative Life of Roger Rabbit. Sidney Janis Gallery, New York, January 10 - February 16, 1991
- Outside America: Going into the 90’s. Fay Gold Gallery, Atlanta, Georgia, March - April 1991.
- A New Low. Claudio Bottello Gallery, Turin, Italy, May 9 - June 15, 1991.
- New Era Space. New Era Building, sponsored by Leo Castelli, New York, October 3–28, 1991.
- Theoretically Yours. Regione Autonoma della Valle d’Aosta, Chiesa di San Lorenzo, Aosta, Italy, May 29 - June 28, 1992.
- Who’s Afraid of Duchamp, Minimalism, and Passport Photography? Annina Nosei Gallery, New York, October 1992.
