= Everything is going to be alright =

Art installation by Martin Creed

EVERYTHING IS GOING TO BE ALRIGHT
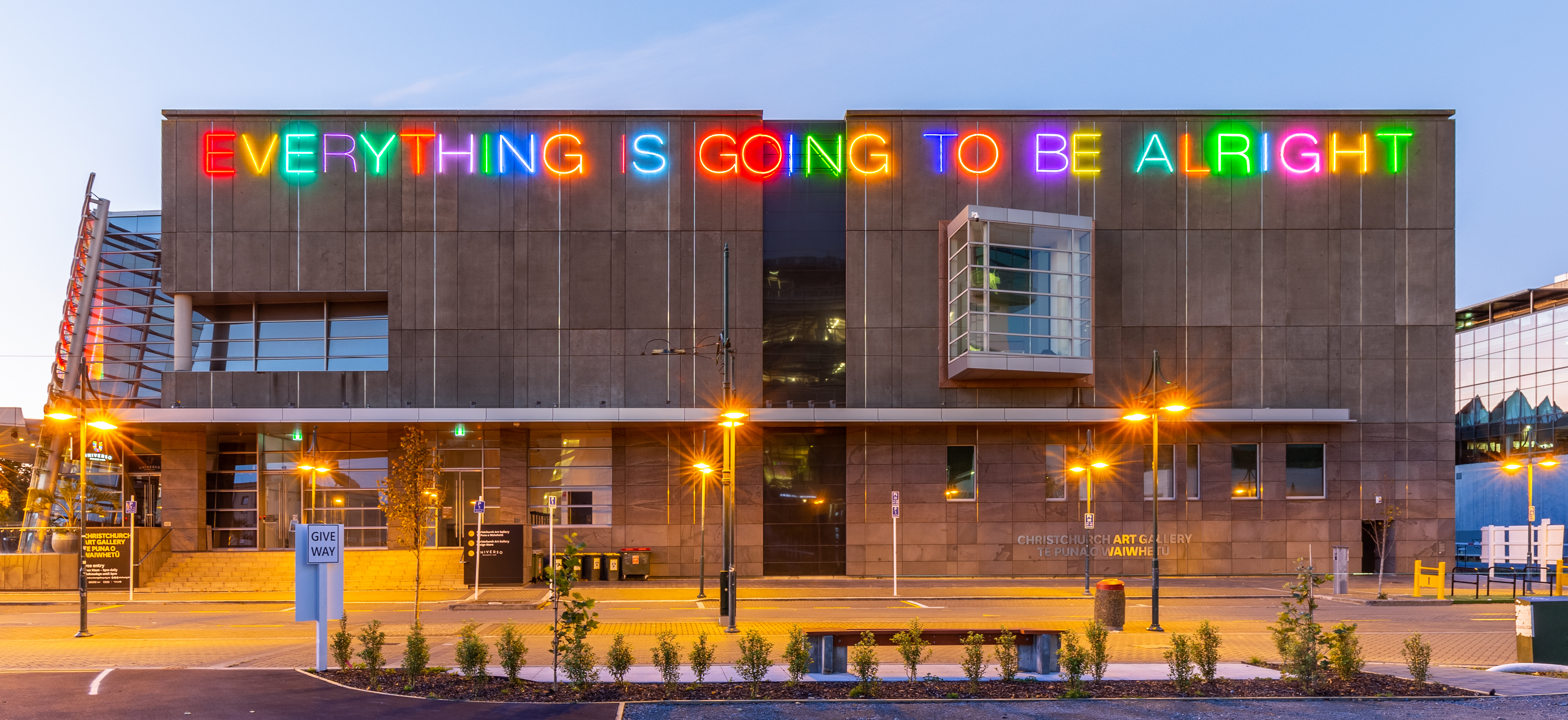
- Work No. 2314: EVERYTHING IS GOING TO BE ALRIGHT (2015), Christchurch Art Gallery, New Zealand
- Artist: Martin Creed
- Type: Neon sign

EVERYTHING IS GOING TO BE ALRIGHT is a series of installations by British artist Martin Creed. Each installation consists solely of the artwork title, formed in large neon letters and is numbered individually in Creed's catalogue. The artworks have been described as one of Creed's most iconic works.

== Works ==
The first installation to be given this title was Work No. 203 (1999), a temporary commission for the Clapton Portico in Hackney, London. Since then, a series of similar artworks have been installed in different social and geographical settings around the world, including:

- Work No. 203 (1999); white neon; Clapton Portico, Hackney, London
- Work No. 205 (1999); red neon; Alberto Peola Arte Contemporanea, Turin, Italy
- Work No. 225 (1999); red neon; 42nd Street/Times Square, New York City
- Work No. 226 (2000); white neon
- Work No. 289 (2003); white neon; British School at Rome, Italy
- Work No. 560 (2006); white neon; Palazzo dell'Arengario, Milan, Italy, for the exhibition I Like Things
- Work No. 790 (2007)
- Work No. 851 (2008)
- Work No. 975 (2008); blue neon; Scottish National Gallery of Modern Art (Modern One)
- Work No. 1086 (2011); white neon; Museum Voorlinden, Netherlands
- Work No. 2314 (2015); rainbow neon; Christchurch Art Gallery, New Zealand Manufactured by David Corbett (Corbett Neon)
- Work No. 3398 (2020); rainbow neon; Museum of Contemporary Art Cleveland
- Work No. 3435 (2020); rainbow neon; Braemar Castle, Scotland

Creed has since used neon lettering in several artworks spelling other phrases, including "DON'T WORRY" and "MOTHERS".

== Reaction ==
The installation has been described as 'visually spectacular'. Tate Britain curator Debra Lennard described the artworks as "tak[ing] on slightly different inflections according to the circumstances of their display". While some reviewers have noted the hopeful and familiar tone of the phrase, others have interpreted the artwork as suggesting that "everything might not be alright" and an "ironic comment on today’s consumer-driven world".

== Gallery ==
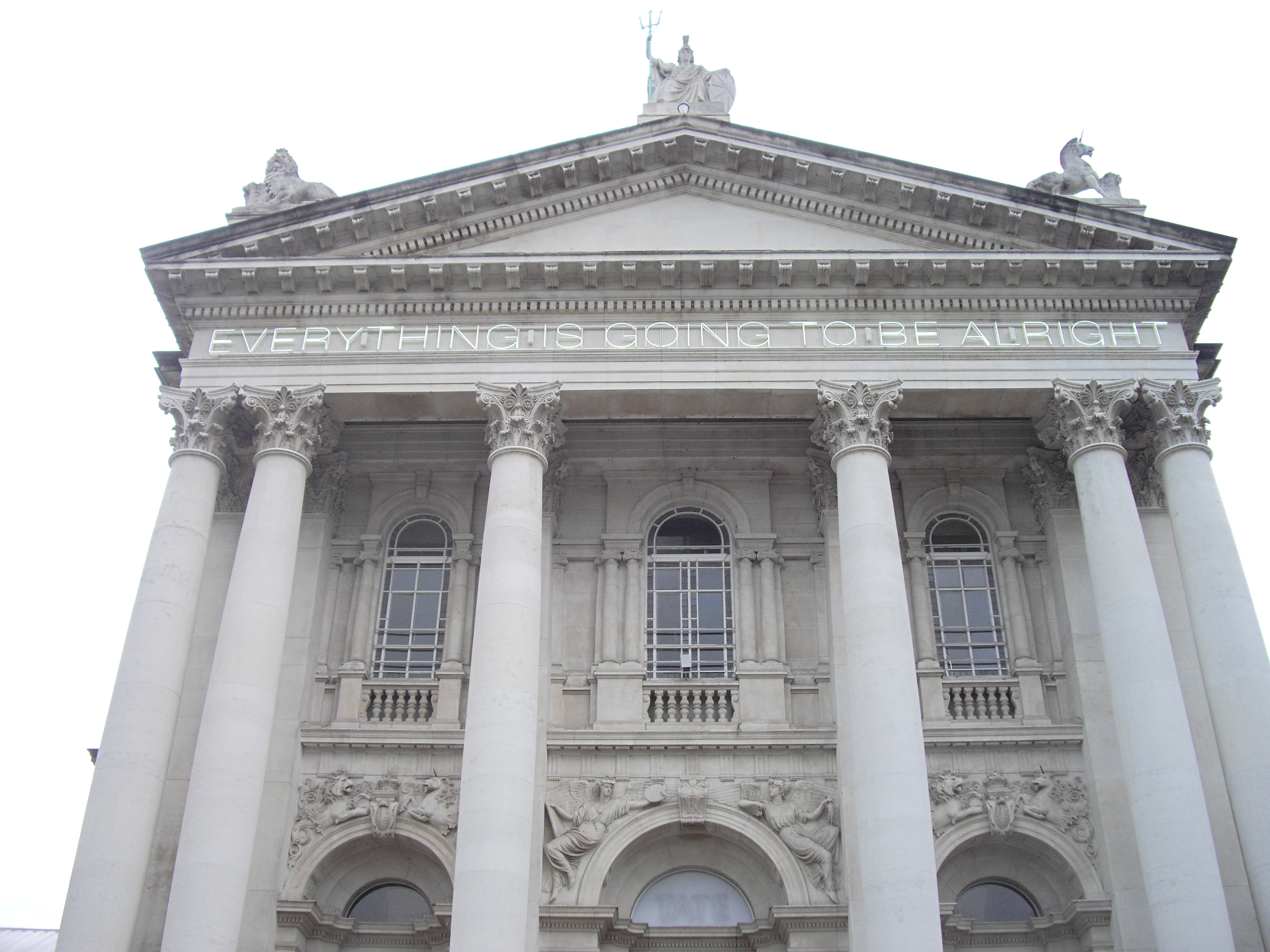
Work No. 203, Tate Britain

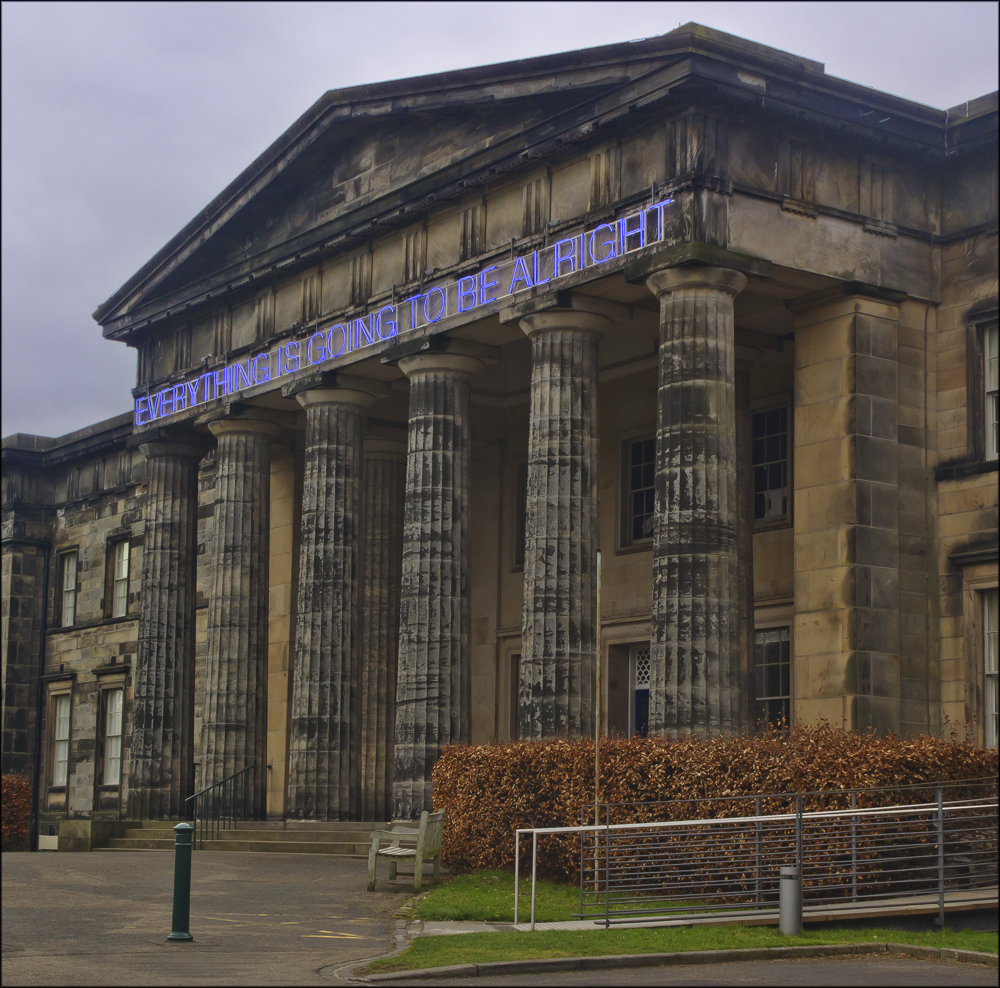
Work No. 975, Scottish National Gallery of Modern Art (Modern One)

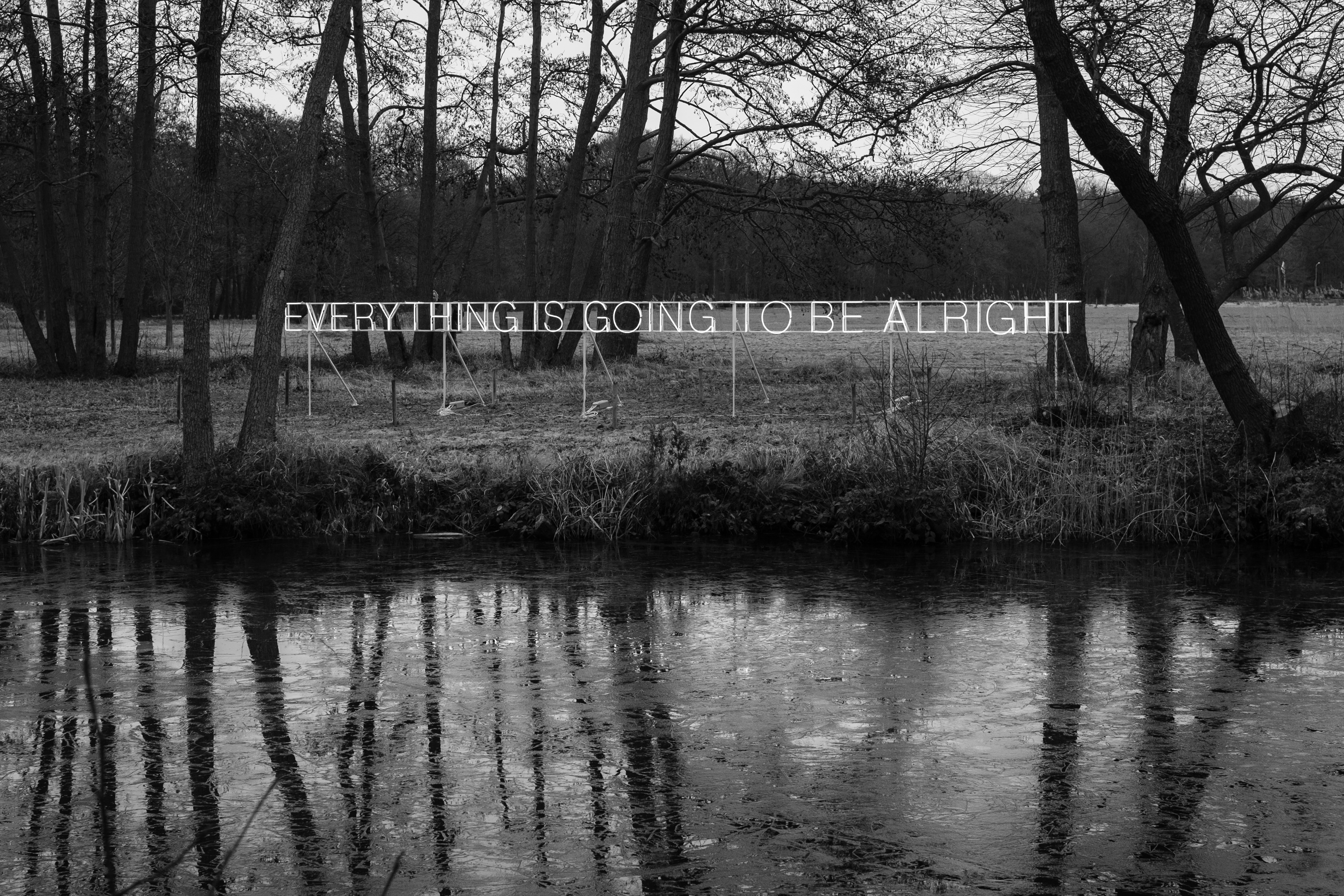
Work No. 1086, Museum Voorlinden
