= Fruitmarket Gallery =

Art gallery in Scotland

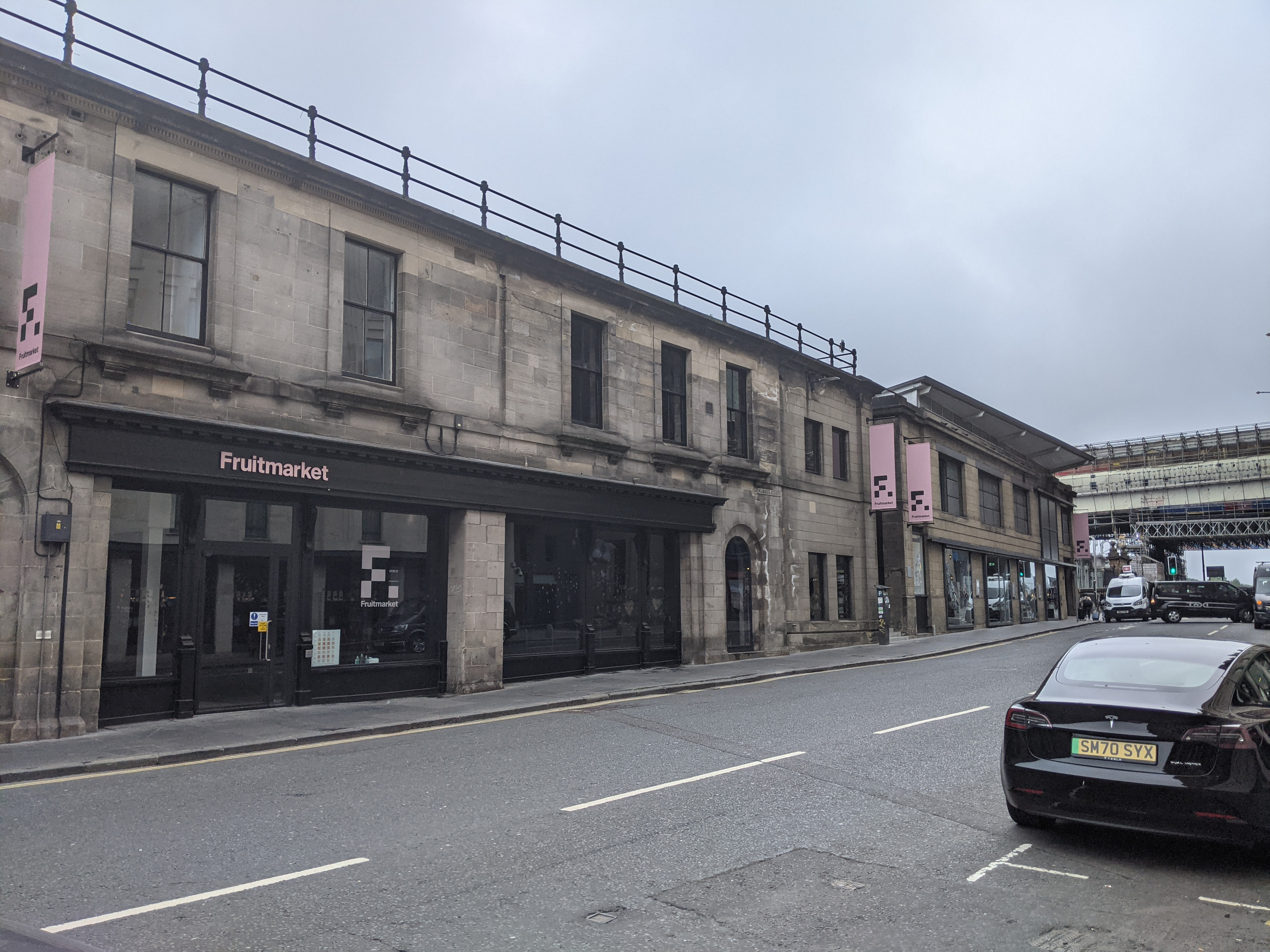
- Main entrance on Market St

- Location within Edinburgh city centre
- Established: 1974; 52 years ago
- Location: 45 Market Street, Edinburgh, Scotland, UK
- Coordinates: 55.9513094°N 3.191632°W
- Type: Contemporary art gallery
- Visitors: 115,000 (2022)
- Director: Fiona Bradley
- Public transit access: Edinburgh Waverley
- Website: fruitmarket.co.uk

Listed Building – Category B
- Official name: 31, 32-35 and 36-39 (Inclusive Numbers), Market Street, Edinburgh
- Designated: 22 June 2015
- Reference no.: LB52353

The Fruitmarket Gallery is a contemporary art gallery in Edinburgh, Scotland.

Since its opening in 1974, the gallery has become part of the Scottish contemporary art scene. After a period of closure to undergo a significant renovation, the gallery reopened in 2021 with expanded exhibition space and facilities.

== History ==
The gallery, which opened in 1974, is located in a building which was originally built as a fruit and vegetable market in 1938. In 1994, the building was renovated by Richard Murphy Architects. It has a café and a bookshop.

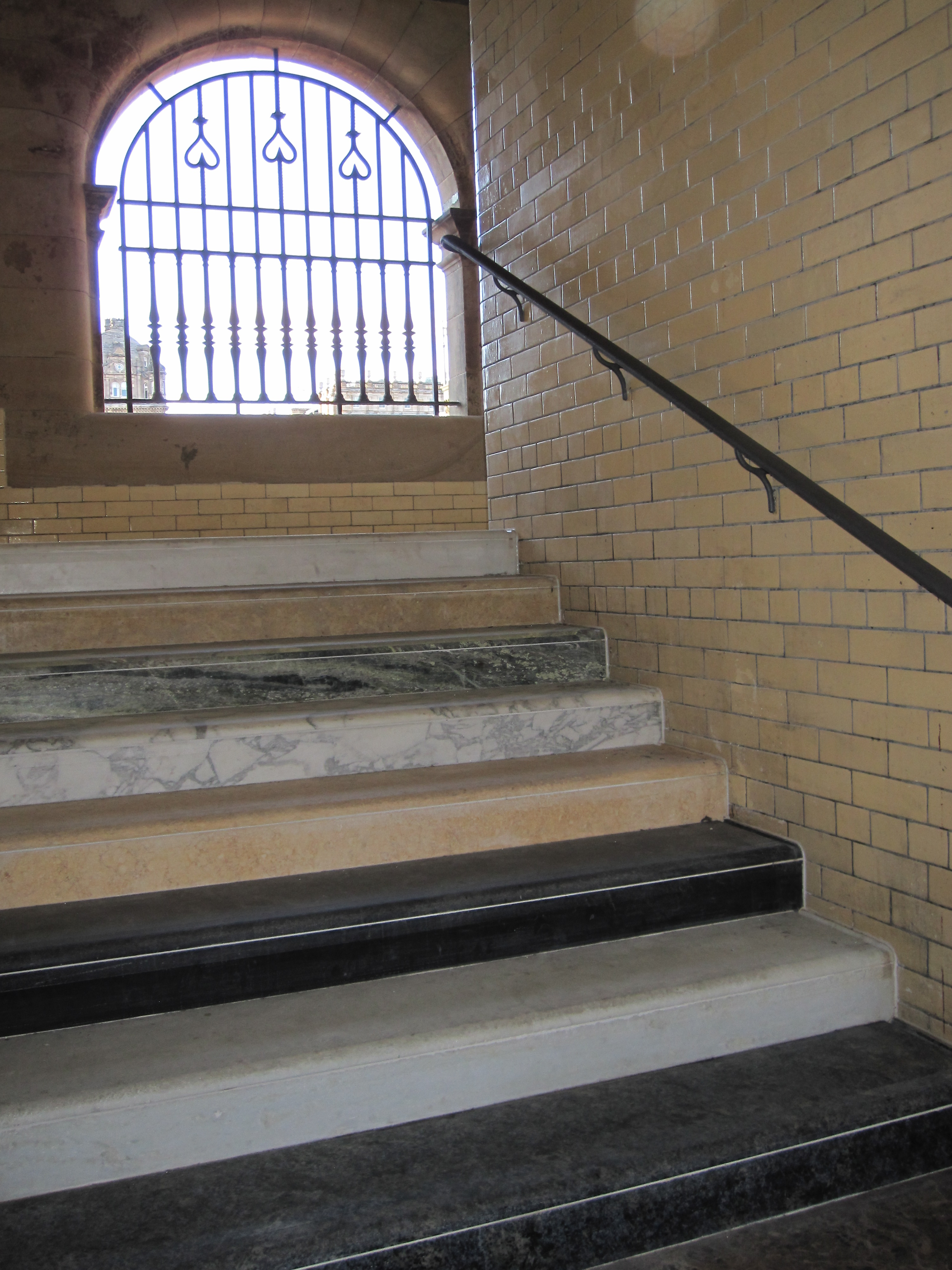
Some of the Scotsman Steps

In 2011 the gallery was involved in commissioning The Scotsman Steps. These 104 steps which link Waverley Station to North Bridge were opened in 1899. They were redesigned by artist Martin Creed (as Work No. 1059) to incorporate a different type of marble for each step in 2011.

Also in 2011, the gallery was selected to curate the Scottish pavilion at that year's Venice Biennale.

In 2018 the gallery announced that it was to close temporarily for a £4.3 million refurbishment project. Designed by Edinburgh-based Reiach and Hall, the revamp included overhauling the existing gallery spaces, as well creating a new exhibition space in a nearby former fruit and vegetable warehouse (later the Electric Circus nightclub), effectively doubling the footprint of the gallery. The refurbishment also created a new space dedicated to classes and workshops, while the existing bookshop and cafe were expanded.

Several artists have been prominent supporters of the project, even as the COVID-19 pandemic put building on hold and pushed up costs: Martin Creed donated the proceeds of a neon work that sold for more than £50,000; Callum Innes helped choose the project architect; and Tania Kovats designed a £15,000 ceramic drinking fountain for the building, intended for visitors to fill up their water bottles.

The gallery reopened in July 2021 with an exhibition by sculptor Karla Black.

== Exhibitions ==
Exhibitions have included international artists such as Janet Cardiff and George Bures Miller, Trenton Doyle Hancock, Cai Guo-Qiang, Alex Hartley and Roman Signer, as well as Scottish artists Callum Innes, Christine Borland, Nathan Coley, Louise Hopkins, Lucy Skaer and Emma Hart.

Exhibitions are accompanied by lectures and other events.

== Management ==
The gallery operates on a mix of public funding and donor support. Entrance is free, and the gallery claimed 200,000 visitors in 2018.
