= Nowhereisland =

Artwork by Alex Hartley

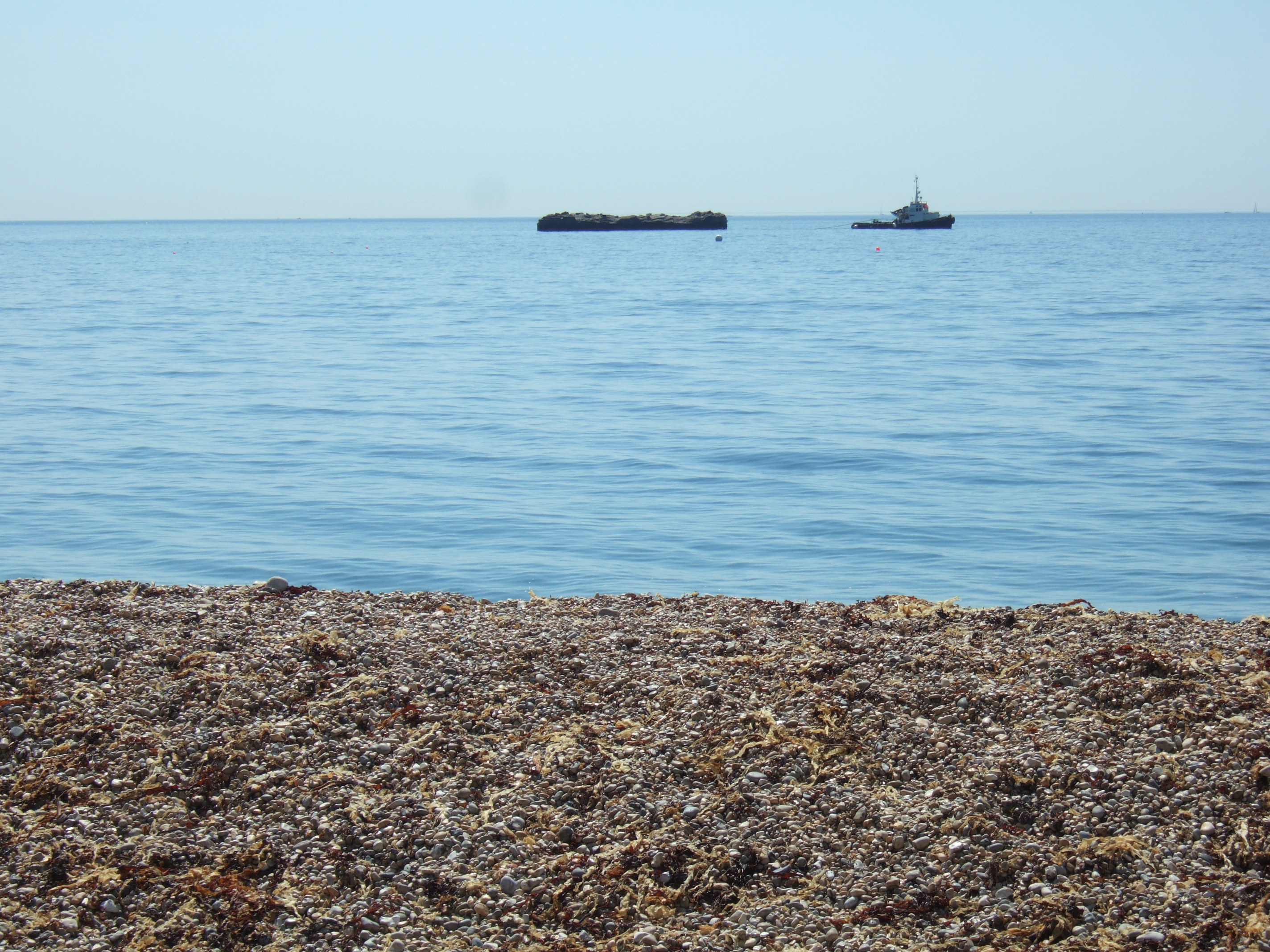
Nowhereisland by Alex Hartley, photographed at Ringstead Bay, being towed to Weymouth Bay, 25 July 2012.

Nowhereisland was an artwork by British artist Alex Hartley, produced by the Bristol-based arts organisation Situations. Nowhereisland was an 'Artists Taking the Lead' project, funded by Arts Council England as part of the London 2012 Cultural Olympiad.

The work consisted of a floating island created using approximately 6 tonnes of rocks from the island of Nyskjeret in the Svalbard peninsula of Norway, which was towed around the South West Coast of England prior to and during the 2012 Summer Olympics as one of twelve artworks selected to represent the regions of the United Kingdom. Hartley discovered the island, which had emerged from the melting ice of a retreating glacier, in 2004 and called it Nymark.

The project was designed to examine democracy and investigate what a borderless nation might look like. Visitors were invited to sign up as citizens of Nowhereisland, which was accompanied by a land-based 'embassy' in a converted horse box, and contribute to the creating of the constitution and objectives of the 'new nation'. On the project website Hartley explained that the island "seeks to redefine what a nation can be. Nowhereisland embodies the global potential of a new borderless nation, which offers citizenship to all; a space in which all are welcome and in which all have the right to be heard. Nowhereisland's constitution is and will be cumulative and consensual, open to all citizens and subject to change during the nation's lifetime."

23,0003 people signed up as citizens of NowhereIsland. The plan was to break up the island and distribute pieces to the citizens. Situations director Claire Doherty described it as "the ultimate form of citizenship ...for ever more, the people of Nowhereisland will not just belong to the nation, they will own a part of it, too." As a final gesture, a small piece of the island was sent to the edge of space, where some particles of rock from the island will remain in the upper stratosphere.
