= Simon McKeown =

British artist (born 1965)

- Born: 1965; Middlesbrough
- Education: BA
- Alma mater: University of Teesside
- Occupation(s): Lecturer, Artist
- Employer: University of Teesside
- Known for: 3D, Disability Art
- Title: Dadafest International Artist of Year 2010–2011
- Term: 2010–2011
- Predecessor: Pete Edwards
- Successor: Incumbent
- Website: Official website

Simon Mckeown (born 1965) is a British artist, and lecturer at the University of Teesside. On 4 December 2010, he was named DaDaFest Artist of the Year for 2011. In 2012, he was part of the Paralympic Cultural Festival (or Unlimited Festival), as part of a focus on Disability Arts. His work was also shown at the 2013 Liberty Festival to help celebrate the anniversary of the London 2012 Paralympics.
