= The Scotsman Steps =

Artwork in Edinburgh, Scotland

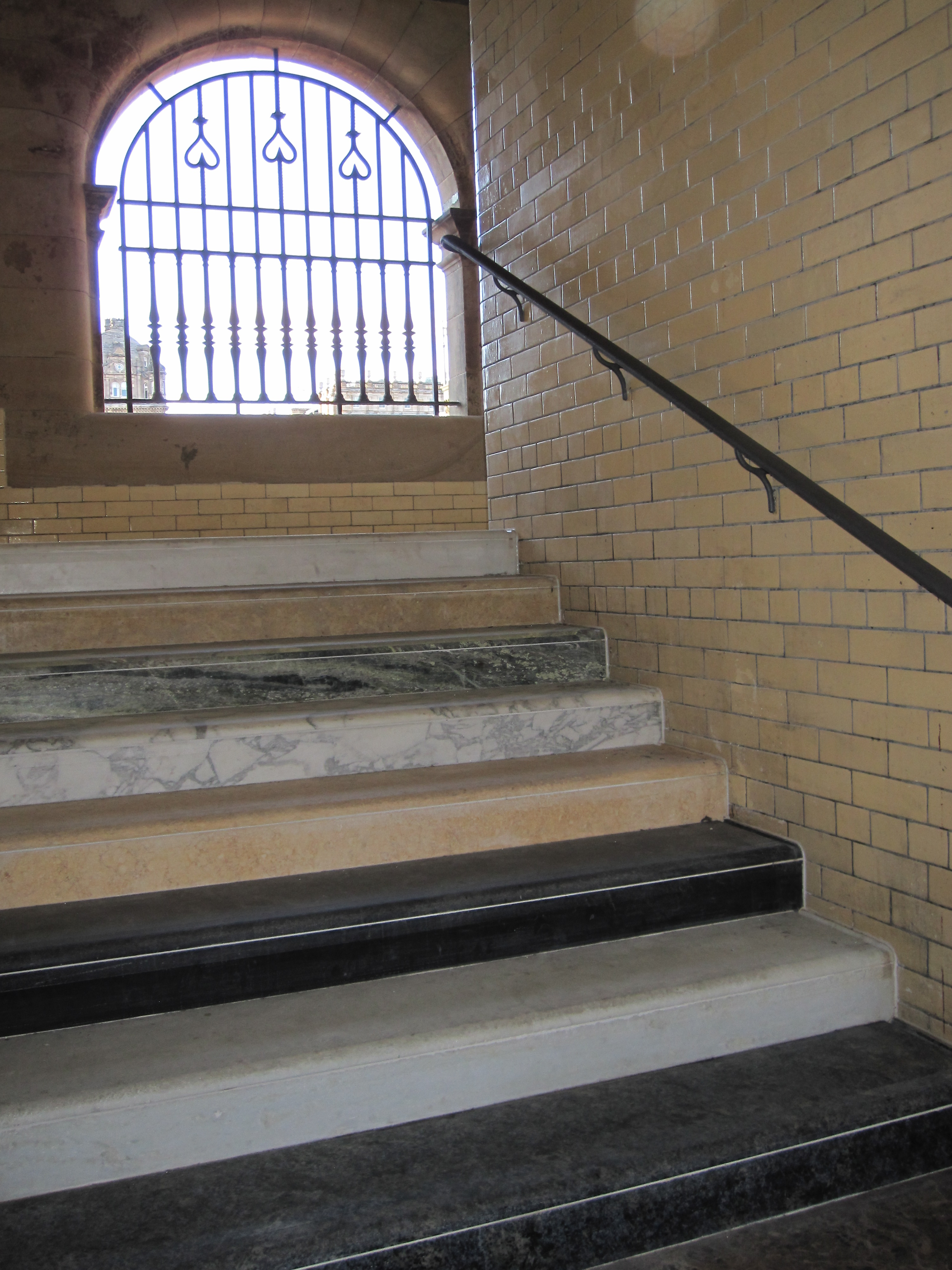
- Artist: Martin Creed
- Year: 2011
- Type: Marble
- Location: Edinburgh, Scotland
- Owner: City of Edinburgh Council

Designations

Listed Building – Category A
- Official name: 20-52 (Even Nos) North Bridge including Scotsman Hotel, Scotsman Steps, Arcade, Royal Mile Mansions, 175 and 177 High Street and 65-71 (Odd Nos) Cockburn Street
- Designated: 12 December 1974
- Reference no.: LB30143

The Scotsman Steps (also known as Work No. 1059) is a permanent installation by British artist Martin Creed in Edinburgh, Scotland.

== History ==
The Scotsman Steps were built between 1899 and 1902 by architects Dunn & Findlay as part of the construction of the building housing The Scotsman newspaper and, since 2001, The Scotsman Hotel. The steps were built in a French style as a spiral staircase within an enclosed octagonal tower; the tower was decorated with wrought iron grilles and glazed tiles in the interior.

Historically considered a road, the 104 steps form a pedestrian link between the North Bridge and Waverley Station's Market Street entrance. The construction of the Scotsman building at the turn of the 20th century was part of a regeneration of the surrounding North Bridge area; the Scotsman building and Steps formed a turreted 'gateway' between the Edinburgh New Town and Old Town.

The steps were Category A listed in 1974 and form part of the Edinburgh Old Town UNESCO World Heritage Site. Originally built from Carmyllie sandstone, the steps were re-levelled with a screed finish during the 1980s due to wear.

== Redesign ==
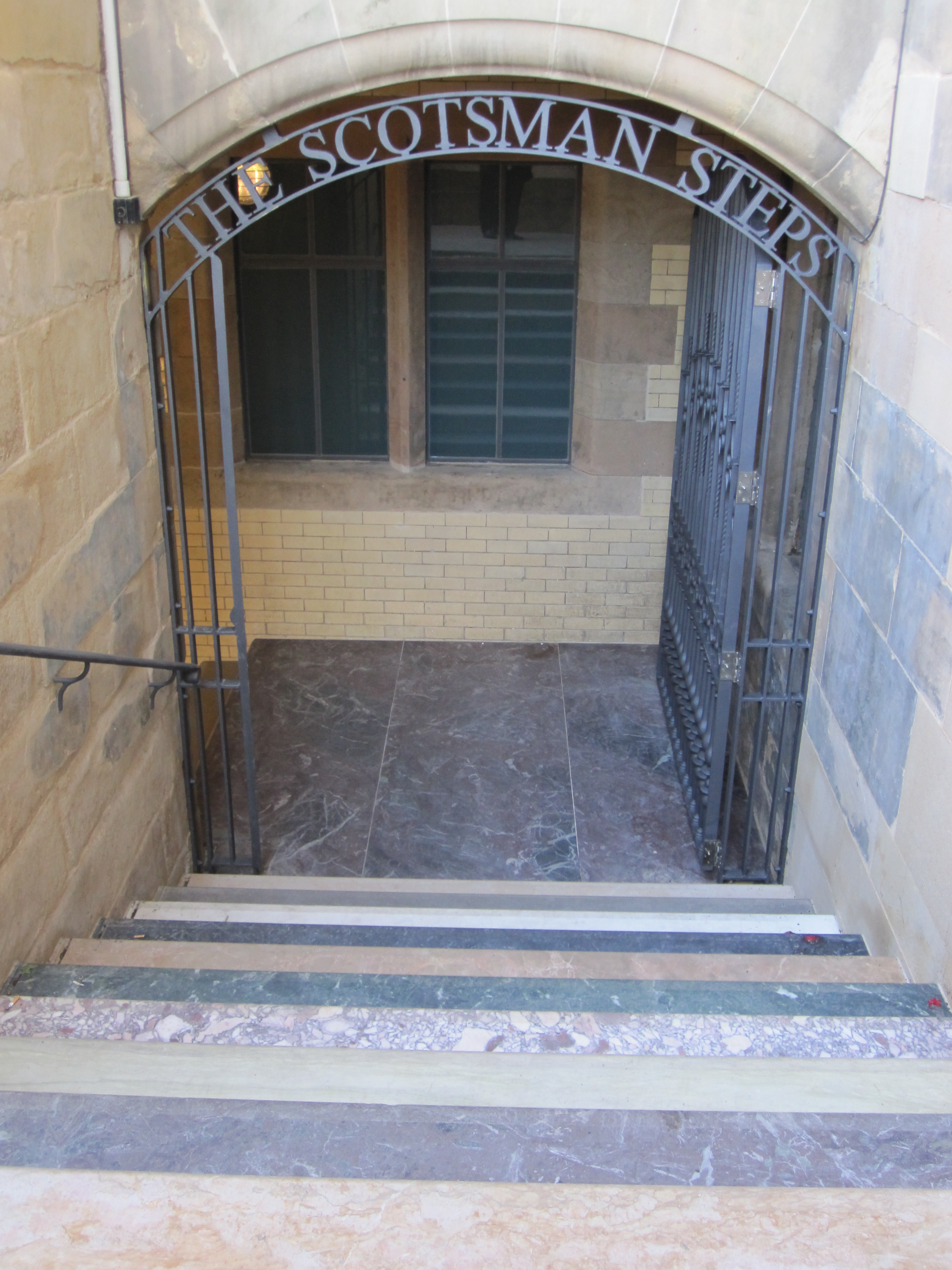
Entrance to the Scotsman Steps from The Scotsman Hotel.

By the early 21st century, the steps had fallen into disrepair and for decades had been plagued by vandalism and antisocial behaviour.

As part of a planned renovation, the Fruitmarket Gallery commissioned a new public installation by Turner Prize winning artist Martin Creed to help improve the public perception of the steps. The installation, titled Work No. 1059, formed part of Creed's solo exhibition Down Over Up which was presented at the gallery in Summer 2010. The installation clad each of the 104 steps in a different type of marble, with all major marble quarries of the world represented.

The artwork was funded by a £250,000 grant funded by the City of Edinburgh Council and Edinburgh World Heritage.

Creed's original idea for the work was to create a 'musical staircase', as he ultimately did on a smaller scale in the Down Over Up exhibition. Creed described the final work as a "microcosm of the whole world – stepping on the different marble steps is like walking through the world."

Marble floors have become a recurring motif in Creed's works, including Work No. 1051 (2013, Museo Jumex, Mexico City) and Work No. 1347 (2012, sketch restaurant, London).

== Reception and awards ==
Overall response to the redesign has been positive, with Guardian art critic Jonathan Jones calling it "the best art at [2011's] Edinburgh Art Festival" and "a generous, modest masterpiece of contemporary public art". In Art Monthly, installation artist Vincent Martin wrote: "[a]s monuments to the global reach of empire go it is both appropriate and unobtrusive." Writing for the BBC in 2018, William Cook similarly described the redesigned steps as "magical, but supremely practical."

In 2012, the Steps won the Scottish Design Award in the Regeneration category. Also in 2012, they were nominated for the RIAS Andrew Doolan Best Building in Scotland Award.
