= Sue Austin =

British artist

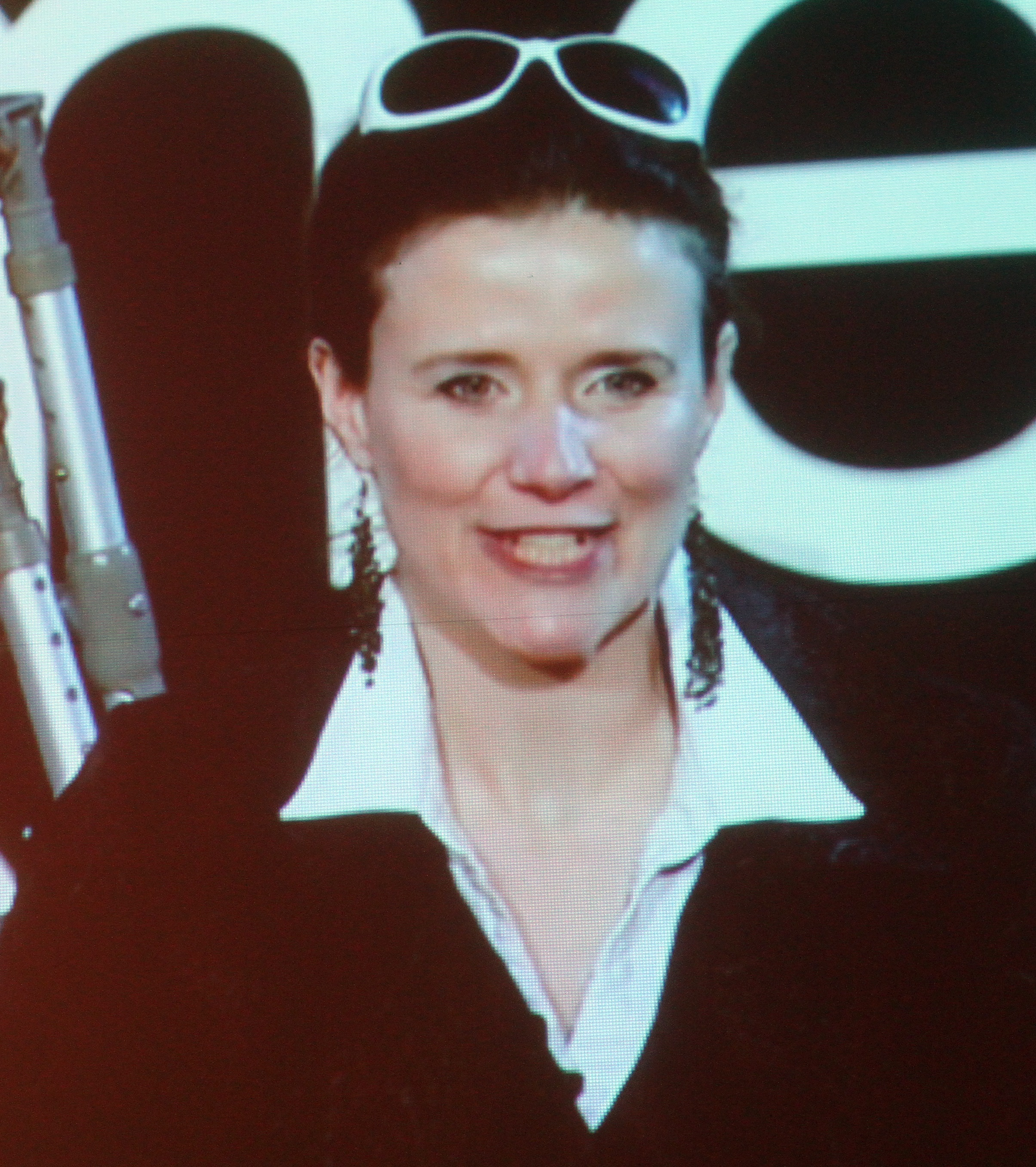
- Sue Austin via video at TEDx Monterey, 2013
- Born: Susan Felicity Austin; 7 September 1965 (age 60); Birmingham, England
- Education: Plymouth University, Swansea University
- Known for: Contemporary Art
- Notable work: "Creating the Spectacle!" (2012), "Freewheeling, Present and Absent" (2009), "360 Degrees – A New Angle on Access" (2015)
- Movement: Disability art

Susan Felicity Austin (born 7 September 1965) is a British disabled artist working in multimedia, performance and installation. Austin is best known for her work "Creating the Spectacle!" in which she uses a specially modified wheelchair to move underwater, using scuba diving equipment; it was performed as part of the London 2012 Cultural Olympiad. Austin's underwater wheelchair has been seen by more than 400 million people worldwide. Austin lives in Devon, south west England.

== Early life and education ==
Austin studied BSc Hons. Psychology at the University College of Swansea, University of Wales, completing her degree in 1987. She later studied for a BA in Fine Art at the University of Plymouth, before going on to complete a Fine Art MA from the same institution in 2014.

In 1996, she began using a wheelchair after an extended illness limited her mobility. She trained as a disabled diver in 2005, and has certifications from the Professional Association of Diving Instructors.

== Artistic career ==
Austin has said her artistic practice considers "the effects of a 'medical' model of disability when compared with writings on the Social Model". The photographer Norman Lomax, who captured images of Austin in Sharm el-Sheikh in the Red Sea, told The Independent: "As a photographer, the best stories are of ordinary people doing extraordinary things – that's what I saw here." He added: "It looked like an extraordinary underwater ballet. It also broke down a deeply engrained perception that I had of disability that I think a lot of us share." Channel 4 News' Culture Editor, Matthew Cain said of Austin's "Creating the Spectacle!": "Despite its title, this piece of work isn't just about creating a spectacle, it's also about changing perceptions and challenging us to think of the NHS wheelchair not as a symbol of limitation but as a tool for release and freedom." Cain called her work "graceful, balletic, and utterly beautiful."

In 2013 Austin told the BBC's South Today: "I started wanting to make work around my wheelchair, but what I found was that everyone always interpreted it as if I was trying to say something negative about limitation fear. But for me it's always been about freedom, it's transformed my life." Austin has a patent covering her underwater wheelchair which was granted on 21 August 2013.

=== Exhibitions ===
Exhibitions of Austin's work have been featured at Faith House at Holton Lee, University of Plymouth, Empire Gallery, London, Tate Modern, London and through on the BBC Big Screens and site-specific work in Plymouth City Centre. Her "Creating the Spectacle" 360 Degrees immersive video is viewed inside a tented structure so that viewers can be immersed in and surrounded by the images.

=== Talks and presentations ===
In December 2012 Austin was filmed for TED's TEDxWomen conference delivering a talk entitled 'Deep sea diving ... in a wheelchair', which as of March 2016 has had more than 1.8 million views. Also in 2012, Austin was commissioned by the 2012 Olympics to create a multimedia presentation as part of the Cultural Olympiad. In December 2013 she was invited to speak at NASA's Lyndon B. Johnson Space Center, on the Houston Safety & Mission Assurance Technical Speaker Forum. Austin was invited in her role as a speaker on the importance of diversity. The talk was not open to the public but was broadcast online by NASA. Austin delivered a talk on her underwater wheelchair work for the annual TedMed conference 2013.

== List of major works ==
- "360 Degrees – A New Angle on Access" (2015-ongoing). This project uses 360 degree technology to create digital artworks.
- "Flying Free" (ongoing). A digital artwork co-commissioned by Unlimited and The Space which features footage of Austin and her wheelchair taking to the skies in a Flexwing Microlite vehicle.
- "Creating the Spectacle!" (2012). A series of live art and filmed performances of Austin's underwater wheelchair commissioned by Unlimited for the 2012 Cultural Olympiad.
- "Freewheeling, Present and Absent" (2009). A trail painted throughout the Plymouth city centre by Austin using her wheelchair. Austin said of the work "By exploring the subjective narratives created by my use of the wheelchair and the traces it leaves, I hope to reconfigure the preconceptions of the viewer and lead to a revaluing of the wheelchair".
