= Owl Project =

Art collective

Owl Project is an art collective formed by Simon Blackmore, Antony Hall and Steve Symons. They work with wood and electronics to create music-making machines that fuse sound art with sculpture. Notable works include 2012 Cultural Olympiad commission ~Flow, a large-scale floating installation which sonified the flow and salinity of the River Tyne using a range of hand-crafted machines, and the iLog, commissioned by Crafts Council UK. They are based in Rogue studios, Manchester UK.
