= Work No. 227: The lights going on and off =

Art installation by Martin Creed

- Artist: Martin Creed
- Year: 2000
- Type: Gallery lighting; Electrical timer
- Medium: Found Space
- Location: Tate Britain; London

Work No. 227: The lights going on and off is an installation by British artist Martin Creed. As of 2013, it forms part of the permanent collection at Tate Britain. The installation is widely considered to be one of Creed's signature art works and has also been described as Creed's "most notorious work".

== Summary ==
Creed was shortlisted for the 2001 Turner Prize for two exhibitions: Martin Creed Works, a solo exhibition at Southampton City Art Gallery, Leeds Art Gallery, Camden Arts Centre and Bluecoat Gallery, Liverpool, and Art Now: Martin Creed at Tate Britain. His submission for the Turner Prize show at the Tate Gallery was Work No. 227: The lights going on and off: an empty room in which the lights switched on and off at 5-second intervals. The space which forms the artwork has painted white walls and concrete floors; the only light sources are the two ceiling lights.

The work exploits the existing light fittings of the gallery space, modifying the lights using an electrical timer. Lights switching on and off form a recurring motif in Creed's works, including Work No. 127: the lights going on and off (1995) and Work No. 254: The lights in a building going on and off (2000), in which lights switch on and off in 30- and 1-second intervals, respectively.

The artwork was acquired by Tate Britain for its permanent collection in 2013; at the time, it had been recently valued as being worth around £110,000.

== Reaction ==
The artwork strongly divided critics and other artists. Rachel Campbell-Johnston, art critic for The Times, wrote: "His flickering installation may mean everything or it may mean nothing, but at least it gives the viewer something to look at, something more interesting than plotless movies and planks of wood." In an interview with The Times, critic David Lee said "Last year, the Tate was scraping the barrel. This year they are scraping the scrapings ... A light being switched on and off is not a good work of art."

Artist Jacqueline Crofton threw several eggs at the walls of Creed's empty room as a protest against the prize, declaring that Creed's presentations were not real art and that "painting is in danger of becoming an extinct skill in this country".

Later reviews have been equally divided, with Waldemar Januszczak writing in 2012: "the worst winner of all time of the Turner Prize was the tedious Martin Creed, in 2001, who showed us an empty room in which a light bulb went on and off, and that was all." When the Tate acquired the piece in 2013, critic Louisa Buck described it as "an important work" and "a sober minimalist piece in a long line of artists using every day materials for potent formal and psychological effect".

Work No. 227 has been identified as one of Creed's signature pieces, and one of his most notorious artworks. The artwork has also garnered comparisons to John Cage's silent 1952 composition 4′33″.
