= Alex Hartley (artist) =

British artist (born 1963)

Alex Hartley (born 1963) is a British artist.

== Career ==
Hartley's artwork was exhibited in Charles Saatchi's Sensation.

With Black Dog Publishing, he produced the architecture/climbing crossover book L.A Climbs in 2004, and the Fruitmarket Gallery in Edinburgh published a monograph, Not Part of Your World to coincide with his solo festival exhibition in 2008.

=== Nowhereisland ===
In 2004, whilst participating in a Cape Farewell Arctic expedition, Hartley discovered Nyskjæret, an island about the size of a football field, in the archipelago of Svalbard, a Norwegian territory in the Arctic Ocean. The island had been revealed from within the melting ice of a retreating glacier and Hartley was the first human to stand on it. He originally called it Nymark (meaning 'new land') and the Norwegian Polar Institute has since recognised the island as Nyskjæret and included it on all maps and charts subsequent to its discovery.

In September 2011 he returned to the island with permission from the Governor of Svalbard to declare territory from the island a new nation called Nowhereisland. As part of the London 2012 Cultural Olympiad, the new nation of Nowhereisland, a floating island, made the journey from the Arctic to Weymouth on the Jurassic Coast and on to Bristol. The island arrived in Weymouth on 25 July 2012 to coincide with the sailing events of the London 2012 Summer Olympics and 2012 Summer Paralympics.

== Awards ==
- 1999: Shortlisted, Citigroup Photography Prize, The Photographers' Gallery, London
- 2015: Coal Prize, Art and Environment
