= Olympic Lottery Distributor =

Former UK government body

The Olympic Lottery Distributor was a non-departmental public body in the United Kingdom set up by Parliament to use money raised by the National Lottery to fund the London Olympic Games and Paralympic Games in 2012.

The Olympic Lottery Distributor had £1,835m available to it during its lifetime and was to fund activities that:

- ensure the timely and cost effective delivery of the London 2012 Olympic and Paralympic Games
- directly relate to the requirements incorporated in the host city contract
- contribute to the infrastructure and sports legacy of the games
- contribute to the legacy that demonstrates social inclusivity
- support wider community and regeneration benefits
- contribute to the delivery of the games which are low carbon, zero waste, conserve biodiversity and promote environmental awareness and partnerships

The Olympic Lottery Distributor had a close working relationship with other organisations dealing with the London 2012 Games including the Olympic Delivery Authority and the London Organising Committee of the Olympic and Parlaympic Games and also with its sponsor department, the Department for Culture, Media and Sport.

The Olympic Lottery Distributor comprised a board with six members, chaired by Rt Hon. Dame Janet Paraskeva DBE, supported by a small team of staff headed by the Chief Executive, Ian Brack.

The Olympic Lottery Distributor was dissolved on 31 March 2013 by statutory instrument. Its property, rights and liabilities were transferred to the Department for Culture, Media and Sport.
