= Paul Rooney =

Paul Rooney may refer to:

- Paul Rooney (artist) (born 1967), British musician and artist
- Paul James Rooney (born 1984), British dancer and choreographer
- Paul Rooney (footballer) (born 1997), Irish footballer

== See also ==
- Rooney (surname)
- Rooney (disambiguation)
