= Lawless (surname) =

- Pronunciation: /ˈlɔːləs/
- Language: English, Irish

Origin
- Meaning: "Outlaw"

Lawless, or Laighléis in Irish Gaelic, is an English and Irish surname. It originates as the name of someone who was literally lawless (Laweles, in Middle English), meaning "outlaw".

== History ==
The name was established in the historical Irish provinces of Leinster, Connacht and Munster around the time of Anglo-Norman invasions of the 12th century.

Sir Hugh de Lawless, a soldier from Hoddesdon, Herefordshire fought in Ireland during the reign of Henry II and later built a castle by Shanganagh. Richard Lawless was Provost of Dublin in 1311, and held the office of Chief Magistrate and Mayor of Dublin for three years. Stephen Lawless was consecrated Bishop of Limerick in 1354, until his death on Innocents' Day, 1359.

== Notable people ==
Notable people with the surname include:

- Alex Lawless (born 1985), Welsh footballer
- Billy Lawless (1950–2024), Irish politician
- Blackie Lawless, stage name of Steven Duren (born 1956), American singer, songwriter and musician. Lead singer/guitarist of 1980s hard rock band W.A.S.P.
- Burton Lawless (born 1953), National Football League offensive lineman
- Cecil Lawless (1821–1853), Irish politician
- Chris Lawless (born 1995), British cyclist
- Elinor Lawless (born 1983), Northern Irish actress
- Emily Lawless (1845–1913), Irish novelist and poet
- Erin Lawless (born 1985), American-Slovak basketball player
- Frank Lawless (1870–1922), Irish politician and participant in the 1916 Easter Rising
- Jack Lawless (born 1987), American musician
- James Lawless (born 1976), Irish politician
- Jayne Lawless (born 1974), English installation artist
- John Lawless, various people
- Lucy Lawless (born 1968), New Zealand actress
- Louie Lawless, Canadian actor
- Margaret Wynne Lawless (1866–1939), American poet
- Nicholas Lawless, 1st Baron Cloncurry (1735–1799), Irish noble
- Paul Lawless (born 1964), Canadian retired National Hockey League player
- Shauna Lawless (born c. 1985/1986), fantasy novelist
- Steven Lawless (born 1991), Scottish footballer
- Terry Lawless (1933–2009), English boxing manager and trainer
- Theodore K. Lawless (1892-1971), American dermatologist and philanthropist
- Tom Lawless (born 1956), American Major League Baseball player
- Valentine Lawless, 2nd Baron Cloncurry (1773–1853), Irish politician and landowner; son of Nicholas Lawless
