= Northern Art Prize =

British art award

The Northern Art Prize was an annual arts prize, established in 2006 and first awarded in 2007, that was created to celebrate contemporary artists practising in the North of England, which it defined as the North, the North West and Yorkshire and Humber, as per the boundaries operated by Arts Council England. It was open to professional artists of any age and working in any medium. In 2008 it was described by The Guardian as the "Northern Turner Prize". It was last awarded to Margaret Harrison in 2013.

== Background ==
The Northern Art Prize was founded in 2006 by artist and curator Pippa Hale of Project Space Leeds in collaboration with design and communications agency Logistik Ltd and Leeds City Council. The prize received financial support from a range of commercial partners over its lifetime, including Marketing Leeds, Arup and Doubletree by Hilton Leeds.

The winner of the prize was directly chosen by a panel of judges, however, there was also an online public vote, where members of the public were able to vote for their favourite shortlisted artist from the exhibition. Only once in the prize's history did these two votes align.

== History ==
=== 2007 ===
The inaugural Northern Art Prize of £15,000 was won by Karen Guthrie and Nina Pope. The prize was awarded by Martin Creed. The other shortlisted artists were: Tim Brennan, Dan Holdsworth and Eric Bainbridge.

=== 2008 ===
In its second year, the Northern Art Prize, was selected by an all-women panel, who selected a shortlist of four, from a longlist of twenty four. The prize fund increased from £15,000 to £16,500, with each of the shortlisted artists receiving £1,500. The final shortlist consisted of four artists: Richard Forster, Clare Charnley, Paul Rooney and Imogen Stidworthy. Their work was shown at Leeds Art Gallery from 21 November 2008 until 1 February 2009. The judges were led by Tanja Pirsig-Marshall, Leeds Art Gallery's curator of exhibitions, who was supported by panel members Iwona Blazwick, director of the Whitechapel Gallery, critic Louisa Buck, artist Georgina Starr and art collector Anita Zabludowicz. Paul Rooney was announced as the winner on 15 January 2009.

=== 2010 ===
Sheffield-based Haroon Mirza was the winner of the 4th Northern Art Prize for his sculpture Anthemoessa inspired by the sirenum scopuli and incorporating footage of Cat Stevens and Edward Armitage's 1888 painting, The Siren. The judges were collector Richard Greer, artist Susan Hiller, journalist Mark Lawson, and director of visual art for the British Council, Andrea Rose. Lawson described Mirza's work as "combin[ing] old and new technology to create multi-layered installations which offer detailed examination and reflect the complexity of the modern world...”. The other artists shortlisted were: Scottish artist Alec Finlay, Liverpool-based Lubaina Himid and Liverpudlian David Jacques. Mirza went on to win an award at the Venice Biennale.

=== 2011 ===
Merseyside-based Leo Fitzmaurice was the winner of the 5th Northern Art Prize; he was nominated by Kate Farrell, curator of Special Exhibitions at The Lowry. Other three shortlisted artists were: Northumberland-based James Hugonin, who was tipped as the winner by the Guardian's critic Alfred Hickling; Richard Rigg, who won 44% of the popular vote; and sculptor Liadin Cooke. The judges were: Caroline Douglas, Head of the Arts Council Collection; Tim Marlow, Writer, Broadcaster, Art Historian and Director of Exhibitions at White Cube; Simon Starling, Turner Prize winning Artist; Simon Wallis, Director at The Hepworth Wakefield with Sarah Brown, Curator of Exhibitions at Leeds Art Gallery as Chair The eight week exhibition of shortlisted artists works between 25 November 2011 and 19 February 2012 at the Leeds City Art Gallery drew an audience of over 130,000. Following this success it was decided that rather than holding the next prize in December 2012, it would reach a wider audience if it was moved to the spring of 2013.

=== 2013 ===
Carlisle-based Margaret Harrison was the winner of the 6th and final Northern Art Prize; she was nominated by Kate Brindley, Director of Middlesbrough Institute of Modern Art. She was successful from an overall long list of seventeen artists, selected by twelve nominators, which had been reduced to a short list that included: Liverpool-based artist Rosalind Nashashibi; Cheshire-based artist Emily Speed; and Newcastle-based collaborative sculptors Joanne Tatham & Tom O'Sullivan, who have been working together since 1994. The judges were: Turner Prize-winning artist Tomma Abts, Sarah Brown from Leeds Art Gallery, Margot Heller from the South London Gallery, Jennifer Higgie from Frieze magazine and James Lingwood from Artangel. The shortlisted artists exhibited their work at the Leeds Art Gallery from 28 March 2013 until 16 June 2013, with Margaret Harrison being announced the winner on 23 May 2013.
