= Rooney =

Rooney may refer to:

== People ==
- Rooney family, of the Pittsburgh Steelers American football franchise
- Rooney (surname), a surname (including a list of people with the name)
- Rooney (given name), a given name (including a list of people with the name)

== Places ==
- Rooney, Kentucky, United States

== Other ==
- Rooney (band), an alternative rock group from Los Angeles
  - Rooney (album), a 2003 album by Rooney
- Rooney (UK band), a late-nineties lo-fi band from Liverpool
- Rooney (film), a 1958 British film by George Pollock
- Rooney (mascot), the athletics mascot of Roanoke College in Salem, Virginia
