= Crossing Europe =

Annual film festival held in Linz, Austria

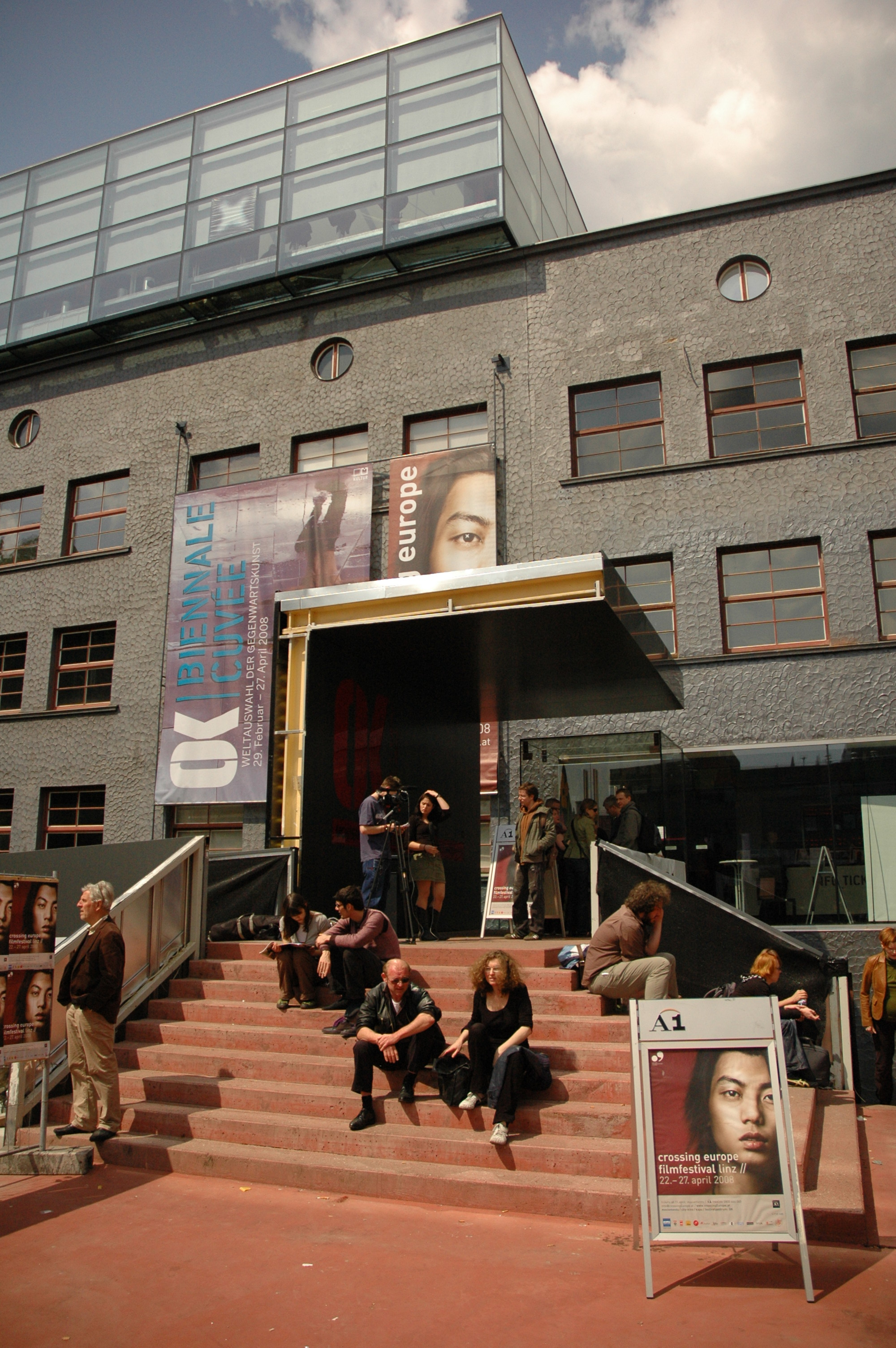
The festival centre and Moviemento cinema, based in the O.K. cultural centre.

Crossing Europe is an international film festival in Linz, Austria, that takes place every year in April since 2004. It defines itself as a platform for young European film makers. The focus of the film selection lies on sociopolitical and youth cultural topics. Every year, about 180 films from more than 30 European countries are chosen to be shown on this six days long festival. Besides Viennale and Diagonale, Crossing Europe is the third biggest film festival of Austria with about 20,000 visitors every year.

Festival juries give away awards in several categories to European fictional and documentary films as well as to locally produced films. For the award competition, only the first or second film made by a director can be qualified. The main prize, the Crossing Europe Award, is endowed with €10,000.

The next date of the festival is from 28 April – 03 May 2026.

== Awards ==
Following program sections and awards are part of the festival:

Jury awards
| Category | Donator | Since | Remuneration (in euros, 2015) |
| Crossing Europe Award – Best Fiction Film | Linz Culture, Federal Government of Upper Austria | 2004 | 10.000 |
| Crossing Europe Social Awareness Award – Best Documentary Film | Federal Government of Upper Austria | 2014 | 5.000 |
| Crossing Europe Award – Local Artist | Federal Government of Upper Austria, Synchro Film | 2004 | 7.000 |
| Crossing Europe Social Awareness Award – Local Artist | Federal Government of Upper Austria | 2014 | 4.000 |
audience awards
| Category | Donator | Since | Remuneration |
| Crossing Europe Audience Award – Best Fiction Film | Crossing Europe | 2006 | 1.000 |
| Creative Region Music Video Audience Award | Creative Region Linz & Upper Austria (2013 as jury award) | 2013 | 1.500 |
other awards
| Category | Donator | Since | Remuneration |
| Crossing Europe Award – Local Artist Drehort Tabakfabrik | Tabakfabrik Linz | 2015 | – |
| Crossing Europe Award – Local Artist Atelierpreis | Atelierhaus Salzamt Linz | 2010 | – |
former awards
| Category | Donator | Since | Remuneration |
| Crossing Europe Award European Documentary | ORF | 2010–2011 | non-cash prize: TV broadcasting |
| FEDEORA Award for European Documentaries | | 2012–2014 | |
| New Vision Award | Silhouette | 2011–2012 | 5.000 |
