= Fringe of Colour =

Initiative focused on the Edinburgh festivals

Fringe of Colour is an initiative dedicated to supporting people of colour at the Edinburgh festivals, in particular the Edinburgh Fringe. In 2020 and 2021, due to the effect of the COVID-19 pandemic on the creative industries, the festival went online with Fringe of Colour Films. The director of Fringe of Colour is Jess Brough.

== History ==
Fringe of Colour was founded by Jess Brough in 2018 as a way to combat what they termed the "overwhelming whiteness" of the Edinburgh Festivals. When Brough first attended the festivals they noted that “I was looking for work by black performers and finding it really difficult.” Fringe of Colour began as a publicly accessible database of Edinburgh festival shows by "Black and Brown Artists/Artists of Colour" (as Brough termed it), alongside a free ticket scheme aiming to make these shows accessible to young people of colour. This scheme has been compared to Tobi Kyeremateng's Black Ticket Project, based in London.

In 2019, Brough received the Total Theatre Award for Significant Contribution, Dave's Edinburgh Comedy Panel Prize Award and the Creative Edinburgh Independent Award for the work of Fringe of Colour.

In 2019 the scheme distributed over 500 tickets to young people of colour.

The COVID-19 pandemic affected the delivery of Fringe of Colour, which as a result went online. Fringe of Colour Films streamed over 40 films by people of colour during August 2020, and 23 films during August 2021. Both years, Fringe of Colour Films invited writers to respond to the films screened as part of their Responses programme.

== Programme ==
In 2020, the film programme included, among others, Athena Kugblenu, Mandla Rae, Selina Thompson and Hannah Lavery.

In 2021, the film programme was curated around four themes: Protest, Flight, Rituals and Self. It included, among others, Thulani Rachia, Sekai Machache, and Mae Diansangu.
