= List of Edinburgh festivals =

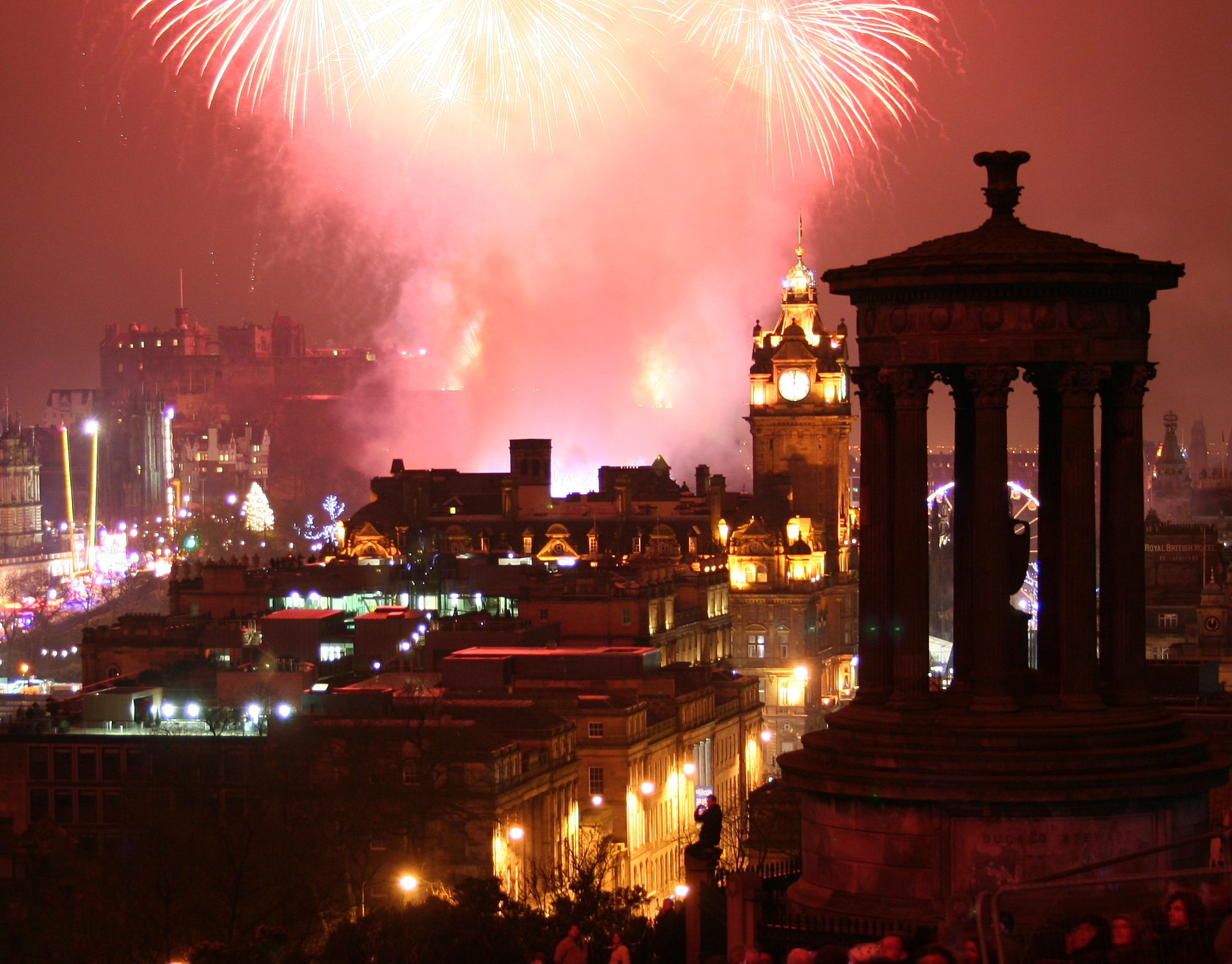
Hogmanay fireworks over Edinburgh

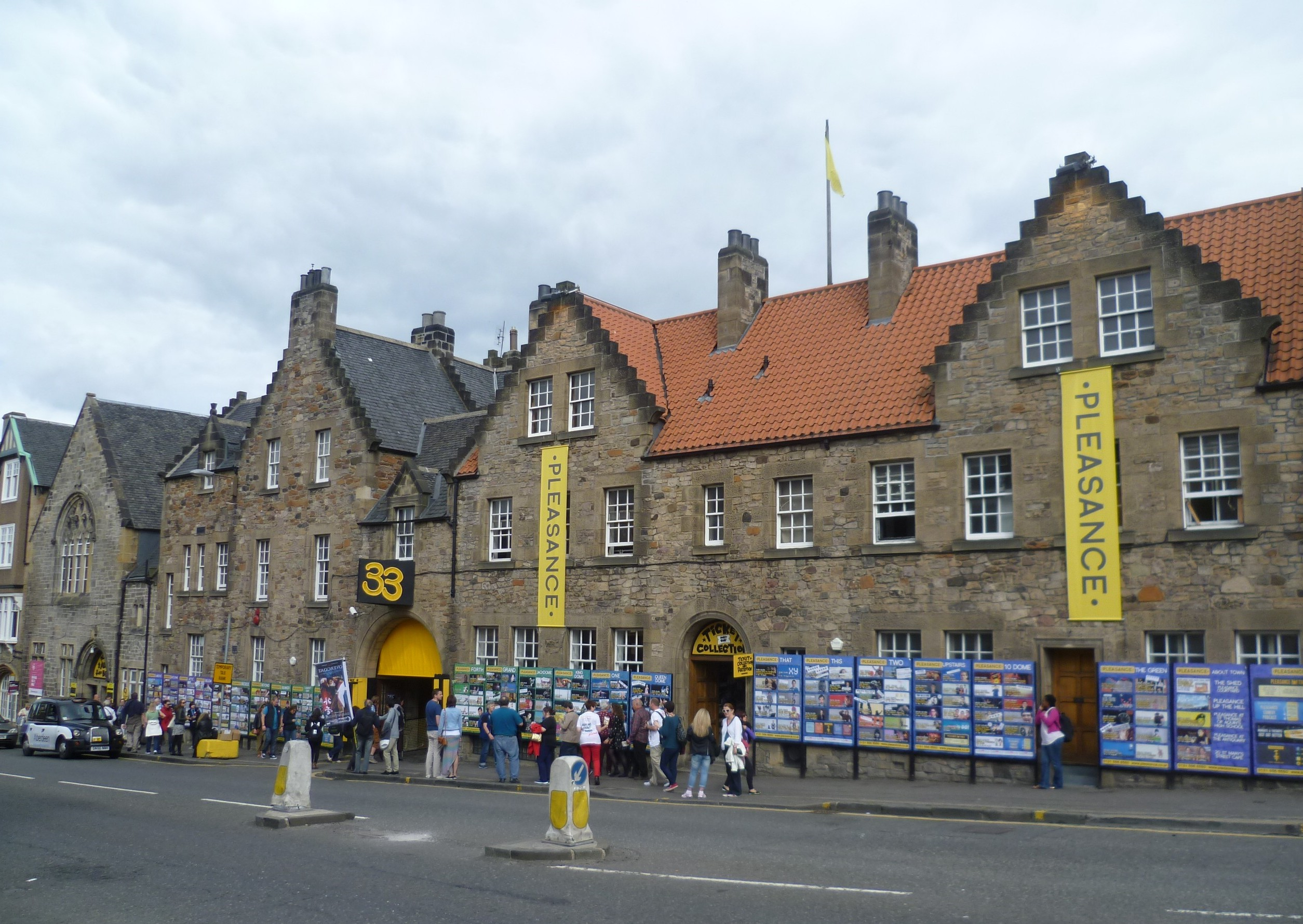
The Pleasance venue

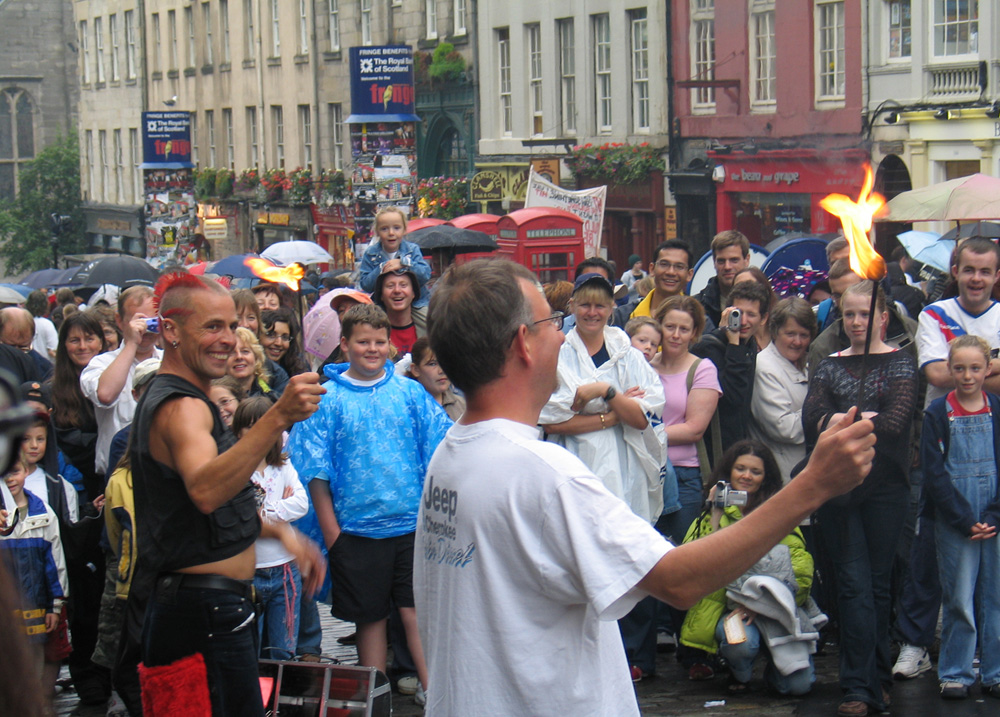
Royal Mile street performance

This is a list of arts and cultural festivals regularly taking place in Edinburgh, Scotland.

The city has become known for its festivals since the establishment in 1947 of the Edinburgh International Festival and the Edinburgh Festival Fringe which runs alongside it. The latter is the largest event of its kind in the world.

The term Edinburgh Festival is commonly used, but there is no single festival; the various festivals are put on by separate, unrelated organisations. However they are widely regarded as part of the same event, particularly the various festivals that take place simultaneously in August each year. The term Edinburgh Festival is often used to refer more specifically to the Fringe, being the largest of the festivals; or sometimes to the International Festival, being the original "official" arts festival. Within the industry, people refer to all the festivals collectively as the Edinburgh Festivals (plural).

In 2026, Edinburgh's festival season was also affected by the introduction of Scotland's first visitor levy, which came into effect in July. Festival organisations called for a greater share of the revenue generated by the levy to be reinvested in the city's cultural infrastructure.

== The festivals ==
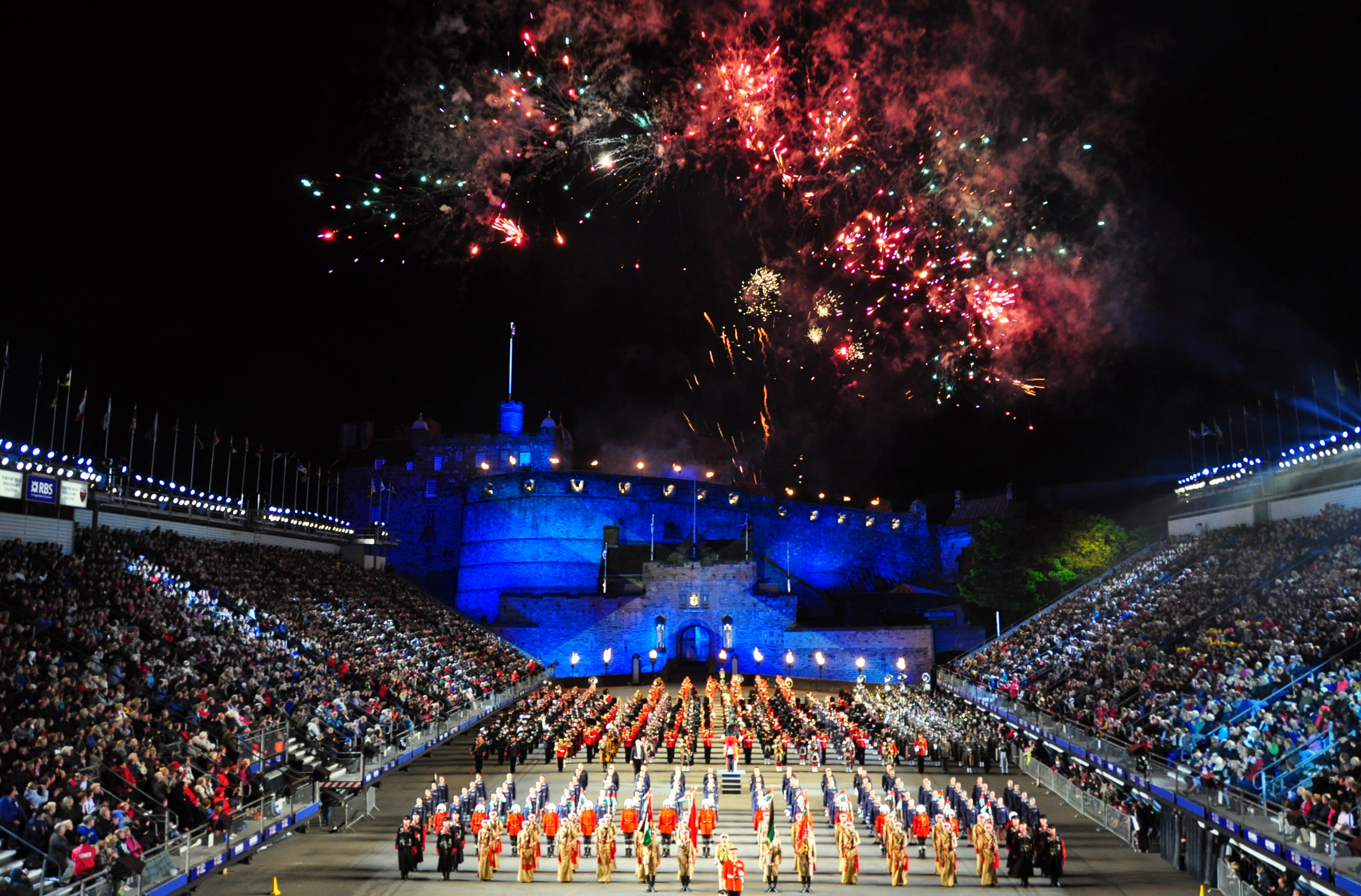
Royal Edinburgh Military Tattoo, 2010

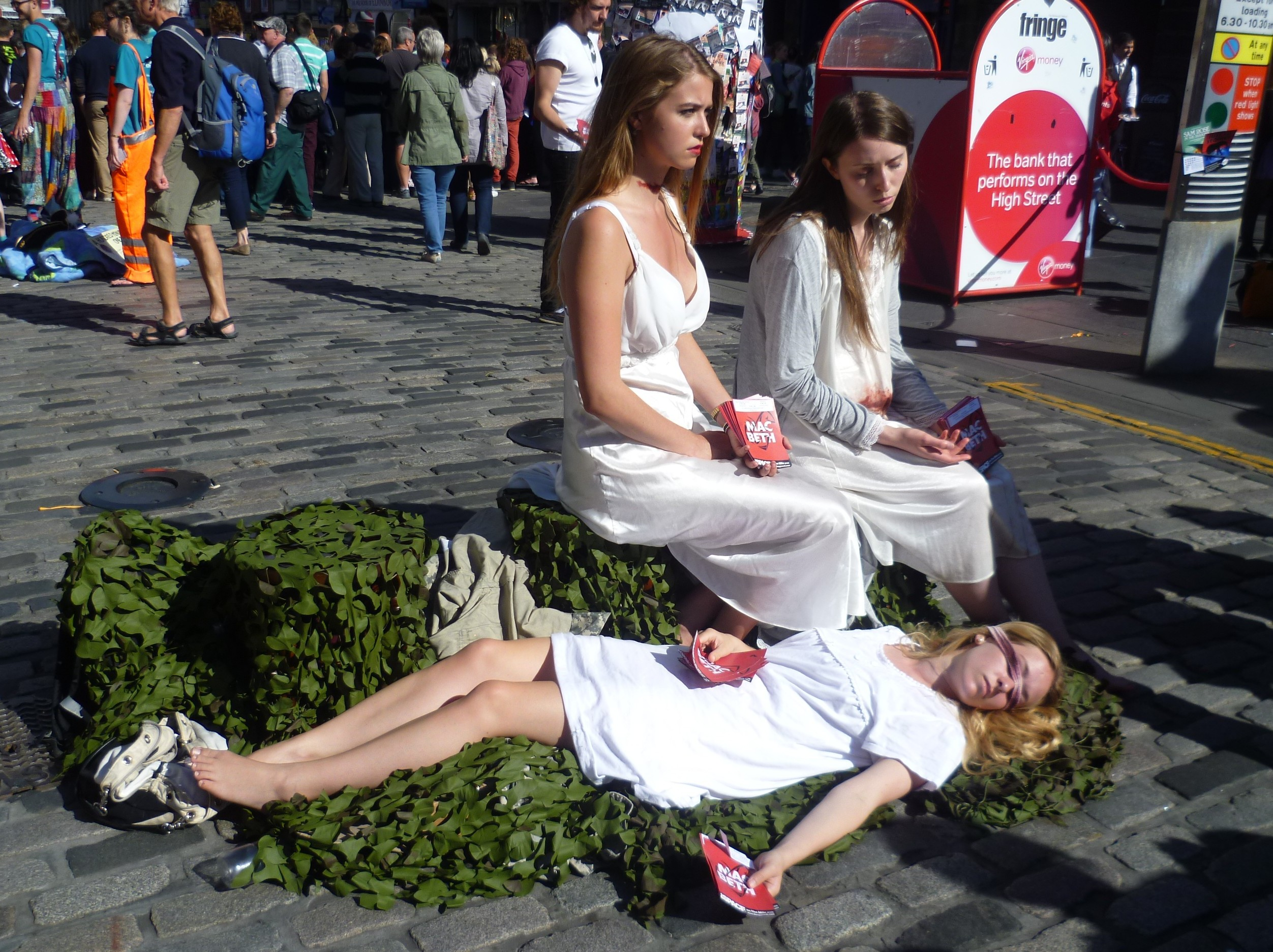
Cast members publicising a Fringe production of Shakespeare's Macbeth

Listed in chronological order by 2018 start date, with year of foundation in brackets

=== April ===
- Dead by Dawn (1993)
- Edinburgh International Science Festival (1988)

=== Easter time ===
- Ceilidh Culture (1951)

=== May ===
- Edinburgh International Children's Festival (formerly the Imaginate Festival) (1990)

=== June ===
- Leith Festival (1907)
- Leith Jazz and Blues Festival
- Edinburgh International Film Festival (1947)
- Hidden Door Festival (2010)
- Edinburgh Annuale (2004)
- CYMERA: Scotland's Festival of Science Fiction, Fantasy & Horror Writing (2019)

=== July ===
- Edinburgh International Magic Festival (2010)
- Edinburgh Jazz and Blues Festival (1978)

=== August ===
- Edinburgh International Festival (1947)
- Edinburgh Festival Fringe (1947)
- Edinburgh International Film Festival (1947)
- Royal Edinburgh Military Tattoo (1950)
- Edinburgh International Television Festival (1976)
- Edinburgh International Book Festival (1983)
- Edinburgh Mela (1995)
- Edinburgh Art Festival (2004)
- Just Festival (formerly the Festival of Spirituality and Peace) (2005)
- Fringe of Colour (2018)
- Festival of the Sacred Arts (2018)

=== October ===
- Leith Comedy Festival (2020)
- Africa in Motion (2006)
- Scottish International Storytelling Festival (1990)
- Festival of Politics (2005)
- Edinburgh Horror Festival (2016)

=== December ===
- Edinburgh's Hogmanay (1994)

=== Uncertain dates ===
- Edinburgh People's Festival (2002, but claims heritage from earlier festival of same name 1951–1954)

=== Defunct festivals ===
- Edinburgh Interactive Festival (2003)
- Edinburgh International Internet Festival (1999)
- Edinburgh Swing Festival (2006)
- Fringe Film Festival (1984 - 1990)
- Fringe Film & Video Festival (FFVF) (1991 - 1996)
- iFest (2007) — the Internet Festival and Conference
- West Port Book Festival (2008) – a free book festival involving secondhand bookshops in the West Port area
