= Kim McAleese =

Director of Edinburgh Arts Festival 2025

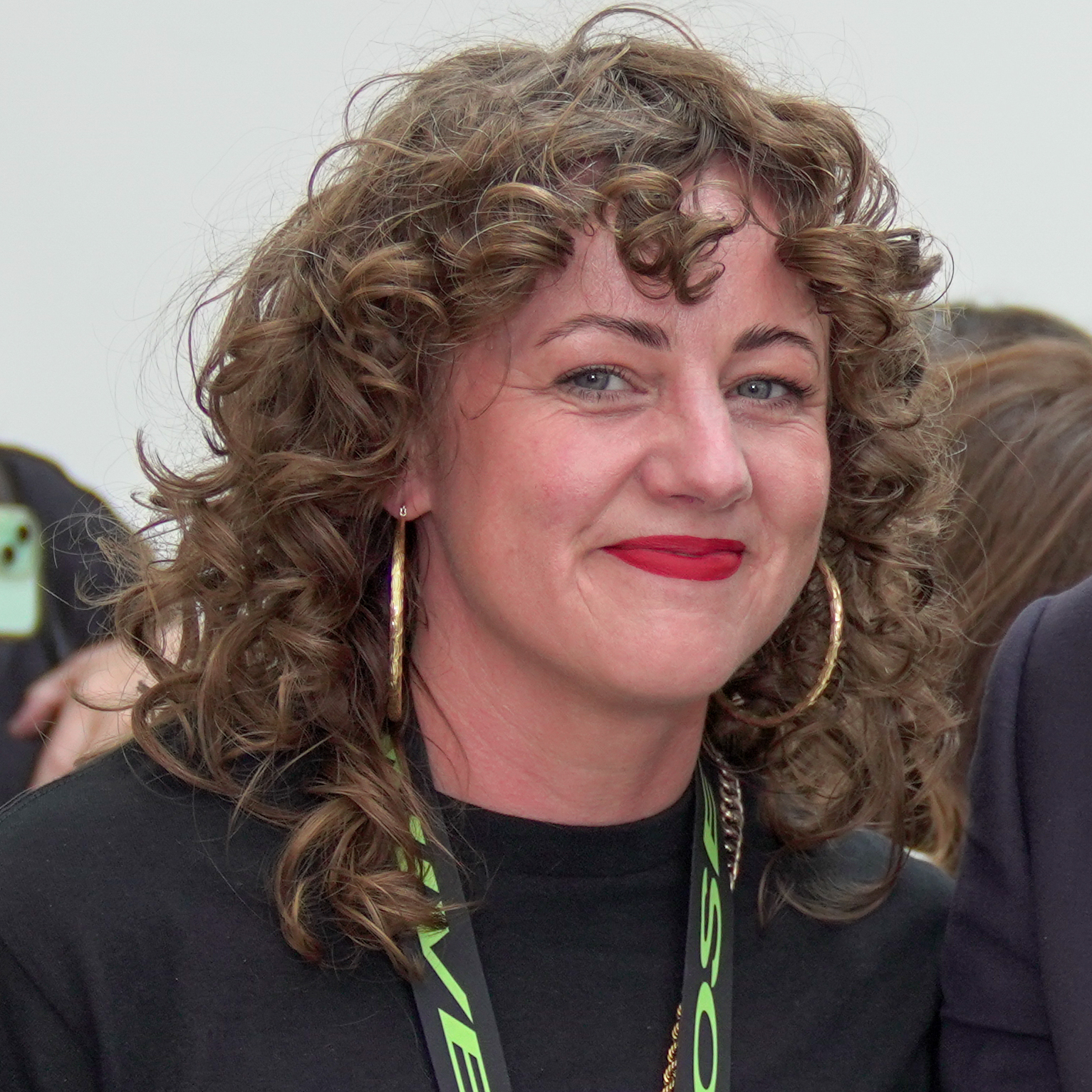
- Born: Kim Therese McAleese; 1983 (age 42–43); Belfast
- Education: Konstfack
- Predecessor: Sorcha Carey

Kim Therese McAleese (born 1983) is a Northern Ireland-born curator who became the director of the Edinburgh Art Festival in 2022. The festival exhibits art during the larger Edinburgh Festival.

== Biography ==
Kim Therese McAleese was born in 1983 in Belfast. She took a one year course in Stockholm at Konstfack to study curatorship.

In 2021 she was a member of the jury for that year's Turner Prize and Margaret Tait Award.

McAleese is the co-founder of Household, a collective curators who organise art projects in Northern Ireland. She worked as an associate lecturer at University of Birmingham and is the vice-chair of Outburst Arts.

She took over from Sorcha Carey in July 2022 as the director of the Edinburgh Art Festival.

She was on the jury for the British pavilion at Venice in 2024.
