= Lucy Over Lancashire =

Single by Paul Rooney
- Released: 23 April 2007
- Genre: Experimental; post-punk; dub; spoken word; monologue; psychedelia
- Length: 16:26
- Label: SueMi; Owd Scrat
- Songwriter: Rooney
- Producer: Rooney

"Lucy Over Lancashire" is a song by English contemporary sound artist Paul Rooney, originally released on 23 April 2007 by SueMi Records as a red vinyl twelve-inch single.

== Composition and narrative ==
Lucy Over Lancashire is, by description, a sound art work, but has been regarded as a full-length song in itself. It was made specifically for broadcast on BBC Radio Lancashire's programme On the Wire, which the song references frequently in its narrative. The song, built on a repetitive, hypnotic and atmospheric musical backdrop heavily inspired by dub reggae and Lancastrian post-punk, features the voice of "Lucy", a "spryte of the air" existing as a disembodied female voice speaking in a deadpan but constant Lancashire dialect.

In an often self-referencing monologue text from her perspective, intended to resemble a conspiracy theory, she details the apocalyptic "master plan" of the Devil being executed in Lancashire that has been explained to her by the mysterious, evil and shadowy figure "Alan", chronologically beginning with the Pendle witches who perpetuated the beginning of capitalism into the "dark Satanic mills" of the Industrial Revolution, and reaching the present day with Lucy tracing the origin of BBC Radio Lancashire to Revelation 13, leading to the voice of radio host Allan Beswick (whose voice appears on the record in character). Musical entities linked to Lancashire, such as The Fall, Mick Hucknall and The Beatles, as well as figures important to the politics of the narrative like Marx and Engels and Lee "Scratch" Perry, are mentioned by Lucy but all have their names changed or distorted. The song also frequently makes use of production effects that are relative and tie into the subject matter, including delay effects, backmasking, and psychedelic layers of Hammond organ playing.

== Legacy ==
Upon being premiered on the radio programme On the Wire in 2006, completing the work's intent, and released in 2007 (originally on red 12-inch vinyl), Lucy Over Lancashire received critical praise. Marc Riley on BBC 6 Music remarked "Love it, absolutely love it – great isn’t it? I told you it was a weird one." A re-mastered version was later reissued on its 10th anniversary in 2017 on CD and digital download, on the record label Owd Scrat. Michael "Fenny" Fenton, host for On The Wire, remarked "that's a fine, fine thing, it still is".

== Track listing ==
No.	Title	Length
1.	"-"	-
2.	"Lucy Over Lancashire"	16:26
