= Sekai Machache =

Scottish artist

- Born: 1989 (age 36–37); Harare, Zimbabwe
- Education: Duncan of Jordanstone College of Art & Design
- Occupation: Visual Artist
- Awards: Royal Scottish Academy Morton Award
- Website: http://sekaimachache.com/

Sekai Machache is a visual artist and curator who lives in Glasgow, Scotland, and works internationally. She works primarily in photography and seeks to interrogate the notion of self.

== Biography ==
Sekai Machache was born in 1989 in Harare, Zimbabwe. In 2012, Machache graduated from the Duncan of Jordanstone College of Art & Design (Dundee, Scotland). In 2020, she received the Morton Award for an artist working in lens-based media, presented by the Royal Scottish Academy. In the same year, her work featured in the Scottish Black Lives Matter Mural Trail. Between 2021 and 2023 she participated in the Talbot Rice Gallery Residency Programme. She is a founder and member of the Yon Afro Collective and in 2020, joined the Edinburgh Sculpture Workshop as a trustee.

== Works ==
- Body of Land: Ritual Manifestations - Street Level Photoworks, Glasgow (Glasgow International Festival 2021)
- Scottish Black Lives Matter Mural Trail (Slessor Gardens, Dundee)
- These Stories: The Divine Sky at Studio Pavilion, House for an Art Lover (Glasgow, Glasgow International Festival 2021)
- Projects 20: The Divine Sky at Stills Gallery, (Edinburgh Art Festival 2021)
- RESET: Jupiter Artland, Edinburgh, (Edinburgh Art Festival 2021)
- Hypnagogia Glossolalia, Fringe of Colour Films, Edinburgh Art Festival 2021
