= Leo Fitzmaurice =

British artist (born 1963)

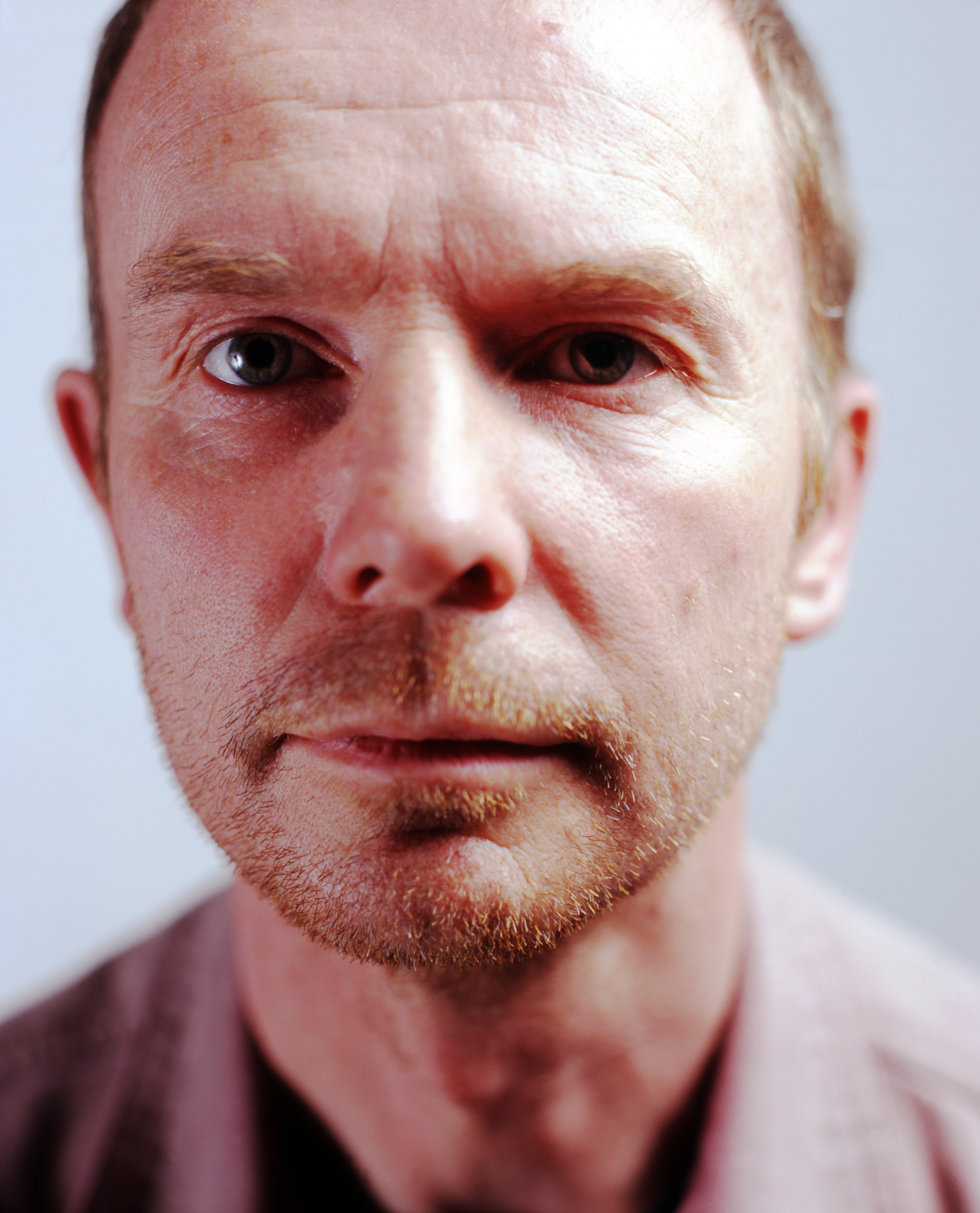
- Born: 1963 (age 62–63); Shropshire, England
- Education: Leicester Polytechnic; Liverpool Polytechnic; Manchester Metropolitan University
- Occupation: Artist
- Awards: Northern Art Prize (2011)
- Website: www.leofitzmaurice.com

Leo Fitzmaurice (born 1963 in Shropshire, England) is a British artist.

== Biography ==
Fitzmaurice was born in Shropshire, England, in 1963. He studied painting at Leicester Polytechnic, Liverpool Polytechnic and Manchester Metropolitan University.

After leaving college Fitzmaurice moved away from pure painting and his practice eventually focussed on a strategy of intervening in already existing objects, materials and situations, a way of working which continues to this day. Some of his earlier work was shown at EASTinternational in 1995 where one of his pieces was purchased for the Arts Council Collection. Also after graduating Fitzmaurice developed an interest in working in non-gallery situations by co-organising a number of 'artist-led' projects such as All in the Mind (1998), with artist Patricia McKinnon Day, which took place inside a disused mental asylum; and Up In The Air/Further Up In The Air (1999–2004) with artist Neville Gabie, which used tower blocks as contexts for art and writing. In these projects Fitzmaurice worked with the artists and writers George Shaw, Julian Stallabrass, Elizabeth Wright, Lothar Gotz, Will Self, Anna Fox, Marcus Coates and Bill Drummond amongst others.

During this time Fitzmaurice continued to develop his own practice, exhibiting widely in shows such as Good Riddance at MOT, London, in 2007; the international sculpture show Blickachsen 6 in Germany the same year; Undone at the Henry Moore Institute in Leeds in 2010 (which was reviewed in Art Monthly by David Briers); The Way We Do Art Now, curated by Pavel Buchler, at Tanya Leighton Gallery, London, also in 2010; Chain Chain Chain, 2012, at Bischoff Weiss, London, curated by Glenn Adamson; and Cosmos Levels, the same year, curated by Jamie Bracken Lobb at The Sunday Painter gallery, London. During this period Fitzmaurice developed the long-term project Post Match which was launched in 2009 with a publication by art agency Locus+. It was later shown at Gallery So in London and reviewed in Creative Times.

Solo projects occurring at this time include Sometimes the Things You Touch Come True at Yorkshire Sculpture Park, 2009; You Try To Tell Me But I Never Listen at the New Art Gallery Walsall, 2011; and Blank Stir at Grundy Art Gallery, Blackpool (with Paul Rooney), 2012. In 2008 Fitzmaurice was commissioned by Harewood House in Leeds to make the sculptural work What Use is a Sign if We Know The Way, and later that same year Leeds art agency Kaavous-Bhoyroo commissioned the found-concrete multiple work Recouper.

Fitzmaurice was shortlisted for the Northern Art Prize in 2011, presented at Leeds Art Gallery, eventually winning the prize for his presentation of a slide-show of photographs and an arrangement of 13 landscape paintings from the gallery's collection.
