= Emily Speed =

English artist

- Born: 1979 (age 46–47); Chester, England
- Education: BA (Hons) Drawing & Painting, Edinburgh College of Art, 2001; MA Fine Art: Drawing, University of the Arts London: Wimbledon College of Art, 2006
- Website: emilyspeed.co.uk

Emily Speed (born 1979, Chester) is an artist based in Liverpool. Her practice spans drawing, sculpture, installation, photography, moving image and performance. It explores the relationship between architecture and the human body. Speed has shown her work at Yorkshire Sculpture Park, Open Eye Gallery (Liverpool) and Tate St Ives, among other places. She has been shortlisted for the Liverpool Art Prize and the Northern Art Prize.

== Education ==
Speed gained a BA (Hons) in Drawing & Painting from Edinburgh College of Art in 2001 and an MA in Fine Art: Drawing from University of the Arts London: Wimbledon College of Art in 2006.

== Work ==
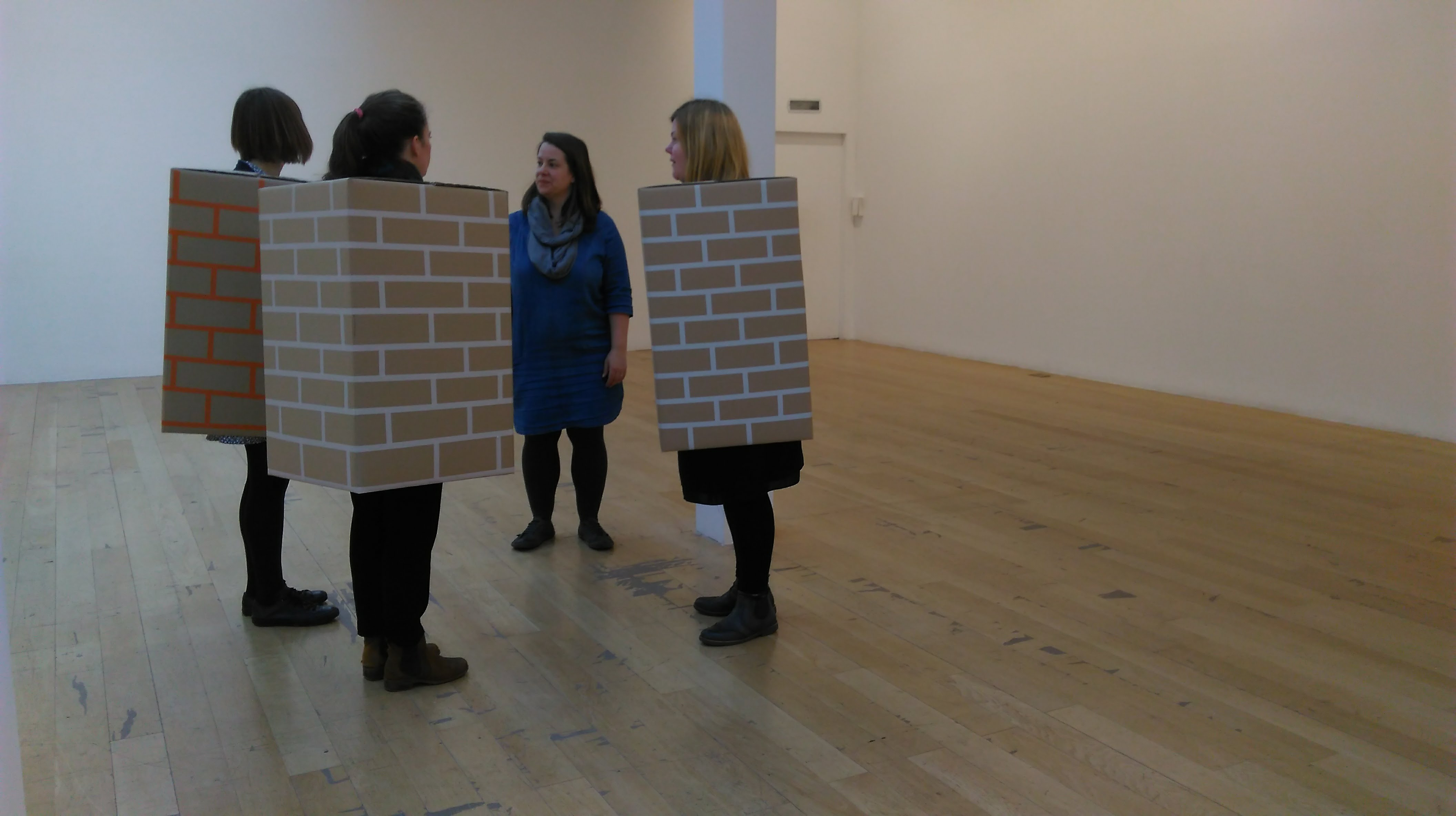
Emily Speed with participants in 'Brick Parade', The Fruitmarket Gallery, 2018

Emily Speed’s work explores the relationship between buildings and bodies. She is interested in how we inhabit and are sheltered by architecture, both physically and psychologically, describing the way in which people are "shaped by the buildings they have occupied and how a person occupies their own psychological space." She is drawn to the parts of buildings less often dwelt in: recesses, corners, stairs, passageways, entrances and exits.

=== Sculpture and installation ===
Speed's practice encompasses small and large-scale sculpture and installation, from tiny hand-made dwellings, to larger manufactured interventions in architectural space.

Much of her sculptural and installation work is site-specific, considering not only the building within which the work is shown, its architecture and its history, but also the locality of that building. For example, in 'Mattdress & Drawers' (2011), created at Yorkshire Sculpture Park, Speed used the furniture from the old halls of residence at what used to be Bretton College (a teacher training college), to reveal a forgotten part of the history of the building and its former occupants. At Open Eye Gallery, Liverpool, she created the site-specific work 'Nothing is Finished, Nothing is Perfect, Nothing Lasts' (2012), a sculpture that was integrated into the walls of the building to make it look as if it was unfolding at the edges.

Several of Speed's installations create small spaces into which the viewer can enter. Examples include 'Reading Room (Box Man)' (2011) and 'Lady Garden' (2013).

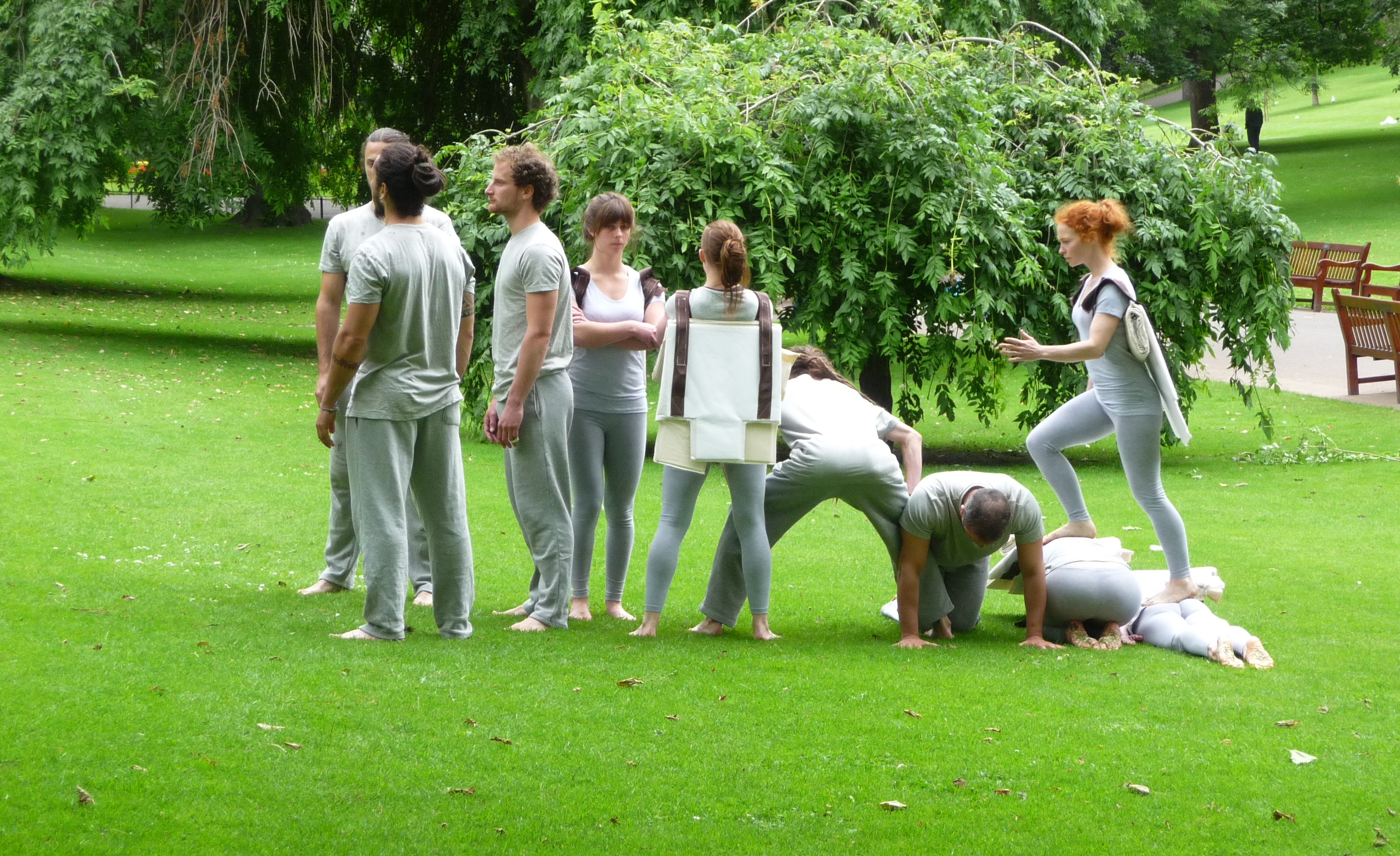
Performance of 'Human Castle', Edinburgh Art Festival, 2012

=== Performance ===
Speed cites the work 'Inhabitant' (2009), created during a residency at the Atelierhaus Salzamt, as an important turning point in her practice. A higgledy-piggledy architectural costume made from recycled cardboard, 'Inhabitant' allowed Speed to realise that "if the body is actually in the work then it’s a totally different kind of practice", which transformed her approach and "led to every other work since.”

Speed began to work with performers in 2012, with the work 'Human Castle', performed by ten acrobats in the shadow of Edinburgh Castle. She worked again with acrobats in 'Build Up' (2013), exploring the balance and endurance of the human body to create and collapse architecture-like structures.

Working with costumed performers has become, for Speed, a means of exploring different aspects of the human relationship with the built environment. In ‘A Parade of Architectural Commas’ (2017), commissioned by and performed at Yorkshire Sculpture Park, five performers made their way through the landscapes of the sculpture park, dressed respectively as a chapel, a ruin, an obelisk, a pyramid, and a grotto. These five architectural archetypes refer to those often used as follies in landscape architecture in the eighteenth century, and the title of the work is taken from Capability Brown's writing on this subject. With Yorkshire Sculpture Park itself a former eighteenth-century estate, 'A Parade of Architectural Commas' served to bring to life the history of this landscaped parkland.

'Rooms Designed for a Woman' (2017), again using performers dressed in and occupying small cardboard buildings, is a film that explores the relationship between architecture and the female body, drawing attention to discrepancies between those who design architectural spaces and those who use them.

Speed's costumes have been called "Dada-style" and her work is often noted for its humour. Although Speed acknowledges this affinity with Dada, particularly in terms of humour and working across media, she does not see it as a straightforward relationship, since she sees her work as more personal than political. Writing for The Guardian, Skye Sherwin draws attention to the "oddball" comedy at play in Speed's work, as well as its ability to allow reflection on "the frailty of things".

=== Artist's books ===
Making books is an important part of Speed's practice. When she was resident at the Women’s Studio Workshop in New York State in 2007 she created one of her first editions of books called 'Unfolding Architecture', which, as she says "brought together imagery, sculpture and text". Other bookworks include 'A House Like Me' (2010) and 'The Cake Book' (2015).

=== Use of media ===
Speed considers drawing to be "the way in which I think about all the work I make, whether it is on paper, in wood or a bunch of acrobats in a pile." Aside from this, cardboard is her most frequently used material, something she describes as "a bit special for me", particularly enjoying working with recycled cardboard, which holds traces of its history over its surface.

=== Influences ===
Speed cites many influences, both artistic and literary. They include: Gordon Matta Clark, Italo Calvino, Kobo Abe, Mark Z. Daniewleski, Franz Kafka (in particular his short story, The Burrow), Marcel Aymé, and Edwin Abbott (in particular his 1884 novella, Flatland).

== Selected exhibitions ==
=== Solo ===
- Emily Speed: Make Shift, Bothy Gallery, Yorkshire Sculpture Park, 16 July - 18 September 2011
- Emily Speed: Nothing is Finished, Nothing is Perfect, Nothing Lasts, Open Eye Gallery, Liverpool, 30 March - 2 September 2012
- Emily Speed: Body Builders, Fort Worth Contemporary Arts, Texas, 21 October - 3 December 2016
- Emily Speed: Rooms Designed for a Woman, Tate St Ives, 25 January - 27 September 2020
- Emily Speed, Tate Liverpool, 25 September 2021 – 5 June 2022

=== Group ===
- Commissions Programme, Edinburgh Art Festival, with 'Human Castle', 2012
- Head to Head: Hayley Newman and Emily Speed, Castlefield Gallery, Manchester, 1 March - 7 April 2013
- Drawing Biennial, Drawing Room, London, 18 April – 15 May 2013
- Cities of Ash, g39, Cardiff, 11 July - September 2014
- [Re]construct, Yorkshire Sculpture Park, 1 April - 25 June 2017
- Slight Works, The Fruitmarket Gallery, Edinburgh, 20–25 February 2018

== Collections (selected) ==
- Arts Council Collection, London
- Women's Studio Workshop, NY State

== Awards ==
- Liverpool Art Prize 2010, shortlist
- Bar-Tur Award 2011, shortlist
- Northern Art Prize 2013, shortlist

== Further reading and watching ==
- ‘(Dis)ordering the City: Buildings, Bodies and Urban Space: Emily Speed in conversation with Duncan Light', In Certain Places, 2016
- Tracey Warr, 'The Practice of Space: Hayley Newman & Emily Speed', Castlefield Gallery, Manchester, 2013
- Emily Speed interviewed by Steve Pantazis, Corridor 8, March 2013
