= Liverpool Art Prize =

The Liverpool Art Prize is contemporary art competition open to professional artists based in the Liverpool City Region area of the United Kingdom.

== Background ==
The inaugural competition took place in 2008. The competition was inspired by the Turner Prize held in Liverpool in 2007 at the Tate Gallery. The Liverpool Art Prize is organised by www.artinliverpool.com

== Winners and Shortlisted artists ==
- 2008 - Exhibition 29 February 2008 to 7 May 2008
  - Imogen Stidworthy - Overall Winner
  - The Singh Twins - People's choice Winner
  - Emma Rodgers
  - Mary Fitzpatrick
  - Jayne Lawless
- 2009 - Exhibition 13 March 2009 to 4 May 2009 - Winners announced on 22 April 2009
  - AL and AL - Overall Winners
  - Terry Duffy
  - McCoy Wynne
  - Nicki McCubbing
  - Richard Meaghan
  - Elizabeth Willow - People's Choice Winner
- 2010 - Exhibition 4 June 2010 to 10 July 2010 - Winner announced on 30 June 2010
  - David Jacques - Overall Winner
  - James Quin - People's Choice Winner
  - Paul Rooney (artist)
  - Emily Speed
  - Gina Czarnecki
- 2011 - Exhibition 6 May 2011 to 11 June 2011 - Winner announced on 1 June 2011
  - Brendon Lyons
  - Bernadette O'Toole
  - Richard Proffitt
  - Markus Soukup
