= Wrik Mead =

Canadian filmmaker

Wrik Mead (born 1962) is an artist/filmmaker from Toronto, Ontario and teaches at OCAD University.

He studied Film and Photography at the Ontario College of Art, where he received his Honours AOCA. In 2004, he continued his studies at Goldsmiths, University of London, where he received his MA Fine Arts.

He works in a variety of mediums including film, video, screen printing and photography. The themes in his work explore issues around queer-identity, desire, the body and fairy-tale allegory. Animation is also a focus in his time-based works, experimenting with various forms of frame by frame manipulation.

Toronto's film and video collective Pleasure Dome presented a retrospective of his work in 1997 that traveled across the country and in 2006 his distributor, CFMDC, released a compilation of his work as part of the Artists' Spotlight Series. He has been included in several texts including a chapter about his film works in The Sharpest Point: animation at the end of cinema. Most recently, PayneShurvell gallery exhibited his first solo show in the UK titled Draw the Line, an installation that included an animated film, sketches, prints and chalk drawings on the walls.

He currently lives in Toronto and teaches at OCAD University in the Digital Painting & Expanded Animation Specialization.
