= Rooney (given name) =

Rooney is the given name or common first name of the following people:

- Rooney Lee (1837–1891), an American planter, military general and politician.
- Rooney Mara (born 1985), an American actress.
- Rooney Massara (born 1943), a British rower and businessman.
- Rooney Roon, a former member of the hip hop group Ultramagnetic MCs.
- Rooney Sweeney (1858 – after 1885), an American baseball player.

== See also ==
- Rooney (surname)
