= Edinburgh Art Festival =

Art festival in Edinburgh

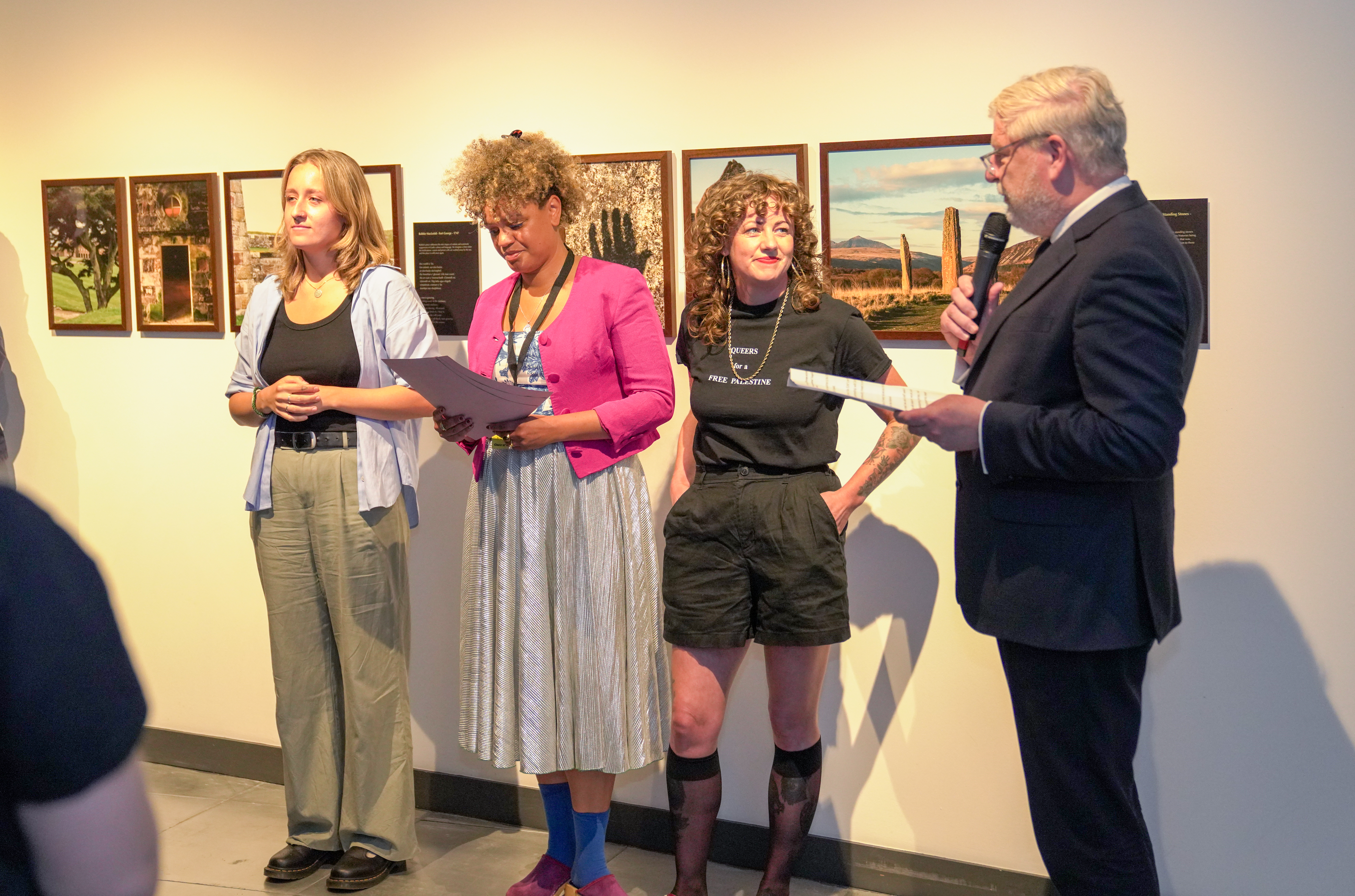
Opening of the 2025 Edinburgh Art Festival

The Edinburgh Art Festival is an annual visual arts festival, held in Edinburgh, Scotland, during August and coincides with the Edinburgh International and Fringe festivals. The Art Festival was established in 2004, and receives public funding from Creative Scotland. In 2022, Kim McAleese was appointed Festival Director, succeeding Sorcha Carey (2011 - 2021). Eleanor Taylor (Programme) and Elle Haswell (Civic) curate the festival. Carey is now Director at Collective, Edinburgh.

== Historical background ==
The Edinburgh International Festival began in 1947, and significant visual art exhibitions were included in the early years. Exhibitions included the French artists Pierre Bonnard and Édouard Vuillard in 1948; a retrospective of the three Scottish Colourists, Samuel Peploe, Francis Cadell and Leslie Hunter in 1949; And Rembrandt in 1950. Thereafter, there was acknowledgement from the Festival authorities that the visual arts needed to be more "emphatically represented" in the Festival itself, and a series of partnerships was forged between the Festival Society and the then Arts Council of Great Britain, the Royal Museum of Scotland, the National Galleries of Scotland, the University of Edinburgh and the Royal Scottish Academy. With a few exceptions, these looked beyond the art of Scotland and contributed to a declared part of the Festival's international aims. Not only did the exhibitions bring the works of foreign artists to Scotland, they cultivated an interest in Scotland amongst wealthy collectors and patrons from around the world.

From 1966, the visual arts existed outside the programme of the Edinburgh Festival, presented instead across a wide range of organisations, from the city's permanent galleries to artist-led initiatives. This left many galleries with no visible profile in August, a time when they were programming substantial exhibitions.

== History of Edinburgh Art Festival ==
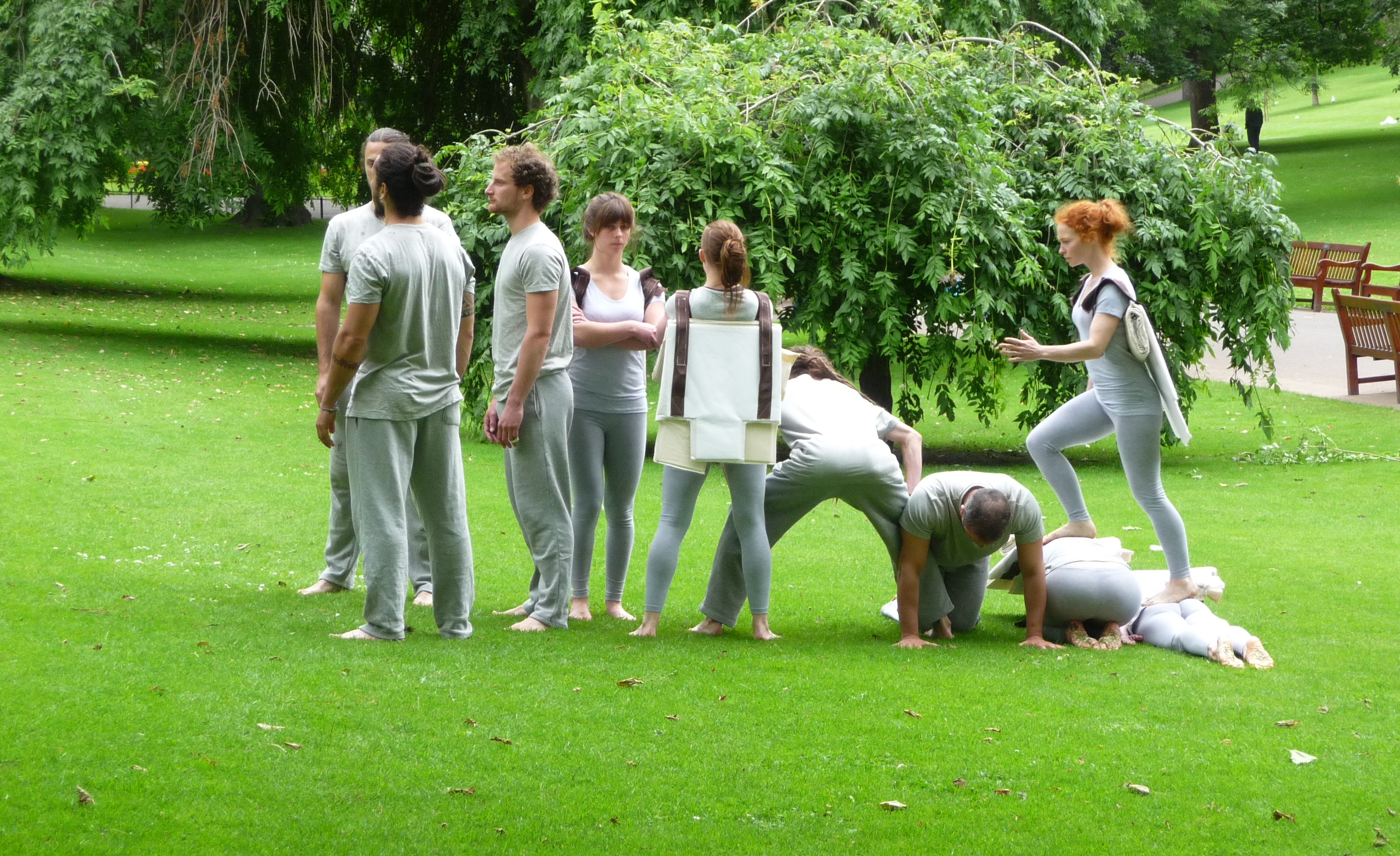
Emily Speed, Human Castle, performed as part of the 2012 Edinburgh Art Festival

In 2001 the newspaper Scotland on Sunday brought together a group of gallery directors and the first visual art festival was piloted in 2004. Between 2005 and 2007 the organisation produced a Festival Guide, commissions, and collaborative projects, to celebrate and promote the exhibitions of Edinburgh museums and galleries in August, creating a collective and united marketing platform in which to showcase their artistic programmes.

Since 2004 Edinburgh Art Festival has grown to be Scotland's largest annual visual arts festival, comprising over 45 exhibitions across more than 30 venues. The festival has also commissioned or co-commissioned major artworks around the city by artists including Martin Creed, Callum Innes, Richard Wright and Susan Philipsz.

Following a scaled down offering in 2020 due to the COVID-19 pandemic, Edinburgh Art Festival launched a hybrid programme for summer 2021. The 2021 festival included work by Isaac Julien, Archie Brennan, Emeka Ogboh, Alberta Whittle, Sekai Machache, Christine Borland, Andrew Gannon, Karla Black and Alison Watt among others. Writing for the Art Newspaper, Tim Cornwell, noted that 'The Black Lives Matter movement continues to resonate strongly over this weekend's post-Covid opening of Edinburgh Art Festival (EAF)'.

In July 2022 Kim McAleese was appointed as the new director.

The 2026 programme was themed around alternative queer culture and local history. Critic Eddie Frankel noted the large scale and variety of the programme which included curated displays, satellite exhibitions, performances and off-site projects.

The 2026 festival took place in August as part of the wider Edinburgh festivals programme. The festival presented exhibitions and installations across galleries and public spaces throughout the city, including works exploring queer history, photography and contemporary social issues.

== Venues ==
Venues in the festival include the Royal Botanic Garden, Jupiter Artland, Fruitmarket, Edinburgh Sculpture Workshop and National Galleries of Scotland.

== See also ==
- Edinburgh Annuale
