= Margaret Harrison =

British feminist and artist (born 1940)

- Born: 1940; Wakefield, United Kingdom
- Website: margaret-harrison.com

Margaret Harrison (born 1940 in Wakefield, Yorkshire, England) is an English feminist and artist whose work uses a variety of media and subject matter.

== Life and work ==
Born in Yorkshire, when her father returned from the war, her family moved first to Bridlington, then to Cumbria.

Harrison studied at the Carlisle College of Art from 1957 to 1961; the Royal Academy Schools, London, England, from 1961 to 1964; and graduated from the Perugia Fine Arts Academy, Italy, in 1965.

She founded the London Women's Liberation Art Group in 1970. A 1971 exhibition of her work that was closed by the police included a piece depicting Hugh Hefner as a naked Bunny girl.

Between 1973 and 1975 she collaborated with artists Kay Hunt and Mary Kelly to conduct a study of women's work in a metal box factory in Bermondsey, London. They presented their findings in 1975 in the installation Women and Work: A Document on the Division of Labour in Industry 1973–1975 that was first displayed at the South London Art Gallery in 1975. The exhibition told the stories of 150 working women who participated in the project and offers an account of the participants' relationship to the workplace, as well as reflections on the changes in labour and industry brought about by the Equal Pay Act (EPA), which had been passed in 1970.

Her work was included in the exhibition Issue: Social Strategies by Women Artists, curated by Lucy R. Lippard, at the Institute of Contemporary Arts, London in 1980. This important international group exhibition highlighted socially oriented feminist art practice and has been recognized as a key feminist exhibition. According to Chris Crickmay, Harrison’s work was amongst others coming into prominence “reflecting social concerns in that had not hitherto appeared in art galleries".

Harrison's installation, "Greenham Common (Common reflections)", recreates a part of the perimeter fence from Greenham Common Women's Peace Camp outside RAF Greenham Common near Newbury, Berkshire, which was protesting against American nuclear-armed cruise missiles being based there. Her work recreates a fence and shows objects like mirrors, children's clothes, and kitchen items attached to the wire. The series was started at the New Museum in New York when she was invited to be an artist in residence there in 1989. Her aim was to make people in the U.S. aware of the camp, noting that: "after all, the missiles are theirs".

Her work "Beautiful Ugly Violence" was described as "a field day of juxtapositions, as the bright and almost cheery colors of her paintings counter the often subdued and sometimes deadly topic: the various means of committing violence against women."

Harrison continues to work in both the United States and England and has exhibited in America, Switzerland, and Great Britain. Her work has been shown in the Museum of Contemporary Art and the Tate Modern. She was a Senior Research Professor and Director of the Social and Environmental Art Research Centre.

In 2011 "I am a Fantasy", was exhibited at the PayneShurvell gallery in East London from 15 April to 21 May. Beverley Knowles curated the show.

In 2013, she won the Northern Art Prize

In 2015, Harrison had a solo show at Ronald Feldman Gallery in New York.

A retrospective of her work “Margaret Harrison: Dialogues Between Sex, Class and Violence” was held from October 2017 – January 2018 at the Azkuna Zentroa, Bilbao.
