= Ifest =

iFest - the Internet Festival and Conference was a festival held in Edinburgh, Scotland in August 2007, at the same time as many of the other Edinburgh Festivals. iFest is designed to complement and work with the other established festivals rather than compete directly.

Launched in Edinburgh in September 2006, it consisted of public-focused events and activities and a conference.

It brought together people from the arts, film, music, media, broadcasting, technology and telecommunication industries, as well as anyone interested in the cultural dimension of the World Wide Web to examine innovative cultural uses of the internet.

The festival was organised by the iFest Partnership, which is currently seeking input and suggestions to develop the festival.

== Other media ==
"Proposals under discussion ... an internet festival, dubbed iFest. ... If all these plans bear fruit, the 'thundering hooves' are less likely to be the sound of international competitors, but rather that of thousands more visitors rushing to visit one of Europe's most vibrant cities." - from Winter 2006 edition of "Conference Call", the magazine of the Edinburgh International Conference Centre.
