= Rooney (UK band) =

British DIY lo-fi band

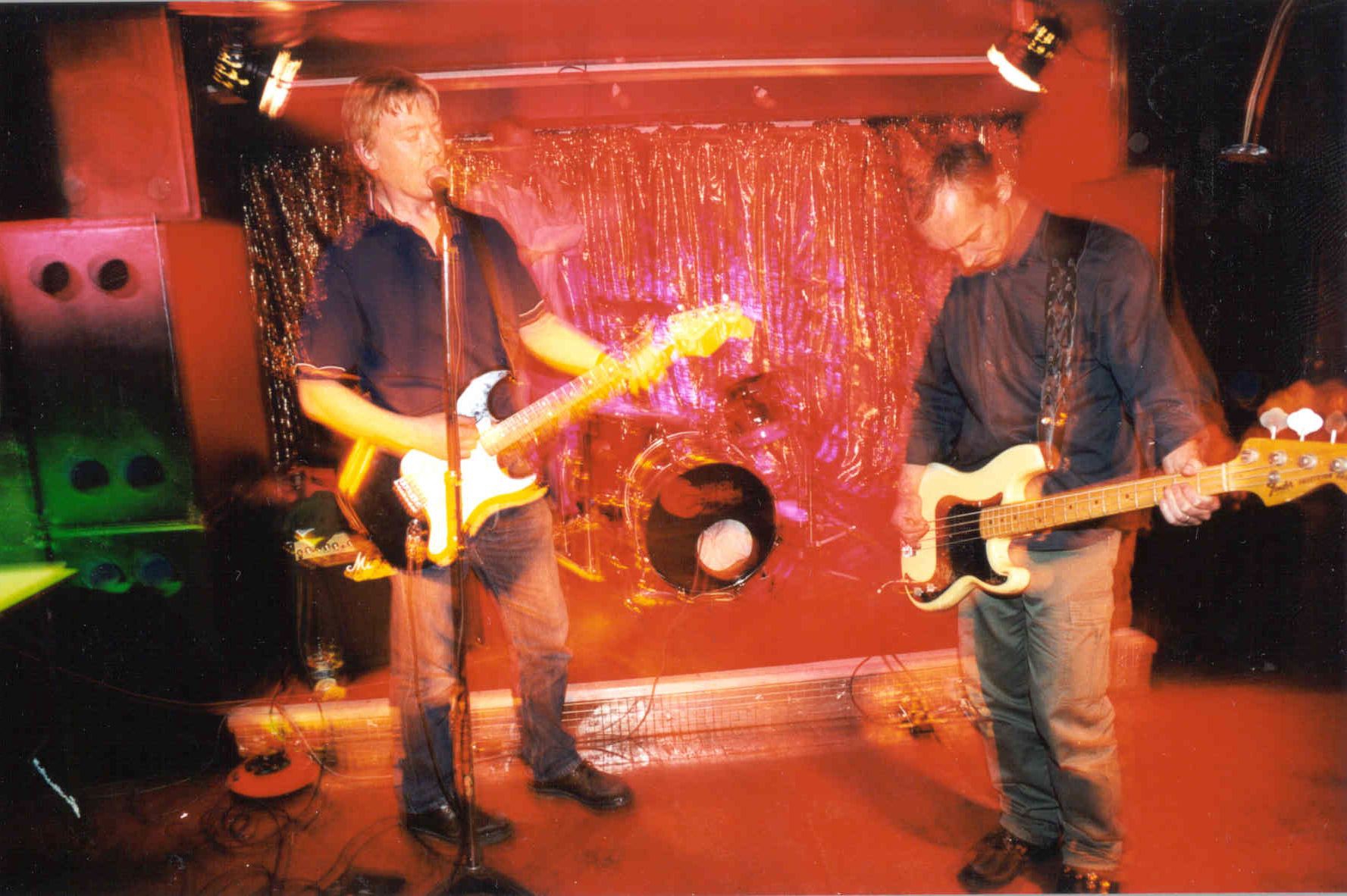
- Rooney at the Magnet, Liverpool, 1999

Rooney were a British DIY band that released three albums between 1998 and 2000, including the debut album Time on Their Hands which received much support from John Peel, who booked them for a session in 1999. They reached number 44 in Peel's Festive Fifty of 1998. The lo-fi music incorporated sometimes humorous — but often unsettling — spoken-sung lyrics describing everyday, mundane activities and observations, an approach which was consistent across all Rooney releases.

== History ==
Artist Paul Rooney self-released the first Rooney album Time on Their Hands on Common Culture Records in 1998. The album was widely and favourably reviewed, including notices by Stewart Lee in The Sunday Times, Tom Ridge of The Wire and Gary Valentine of Mojo. The continued support of John Peel earned a place for Went to Town at number 44 in John Peel's Festive Fifty of 1998, and a Rooney Peel session was broadcast in 1999.

By 1999 Rooney became a band with new members Colin Cromer and Ian Jackson. The second Rooney album On Fading Out was released in 1999, and the project ostensibly ended with the third and final album, On the Closed Circuit, in November 2000, though gigs continued sporadically until late 2002.

In 2006 comedian and writer Stewart Lee curated the Rooney track Into the Lens for the CD/book The Topography of Chance, which also included Mark E Smith, Derek Bailey and Simon Munnery. The Rooney Peel session was repeated in 2016 on Gideon Coe's BBC 6 Music show, and an EP of the session, entitled This Job's Forever - The Peel Session, was released on Owd Scrat Records in 2020.
