= PayneShurvell =

British art gallery

PayneShurvell is a contemporary art gallery established in London in 2010, with a later venue in Suffolk. It has shown the work of Andrew Curtis, Aidan McNeill, Wrik Mead, Margaret Harrison, Anka Dabrowska and other internationally-recognised artists.

The policy of the gallery is to bridge the gap between an artist-run space and a commercial gallery, showcasing emerging UK and international artists and featuring work from all media. Many of the artists shown have international reputations but are little known in the United Kingdom.

PayneShurvell is owned and run by artist and curator James Payne who has shown work at Transition Gallery and is also a writer for Garageland and Arty and a columnist for The Huffington Post and Joanne Shurvell who was previously head of communications for the Institute of Contemporary Arts. The gallery opened in 2010 with a well received group show.

For a time the gallery was in the Hoxton/Shoreditch area, which has been popular with the Young British Artists (YBAs) since the 1990s. In 2017 it opened a gallery in a barn in Suffolk.

Payne Shurvell also offers artists' editions.

== Exhibitions ==
=== A Bright and Guilty Place ===
The starting point for this exhibition was the concept of mapping and the ways in which artists explore the notion of mapping and cartography in their work. The artists are linked together by work that explores the purpose of mapping as a social construct and the use of measuring or navigating; work that explores our 'place'. Some of the artists’ work is not only about specific fixed points in space and time but in stark contrast, deals directly with displacement and states of flux. Most of the artists featured were not from one "place" or even based in one "place". This is common for artists with their peripatetic lifestyles. It is this complex circuit of movement that inspires many of the artists in this show.

The title of the exhibition, "A Bright and Guilty Place", is taken from Orson Welles’ Lady of Shanghai in which the classic hall of mirrors climax sequence intertwines the virtual and the actual. "A Bright and Guilty Place" was curated by Dermot O’Brien and James Payne and featured the artists Andrew Curtis, Anka Dabrowska, Dan Hays, LEO, Aidan McNeill, Wrik Mead, Dermot O’Brien, Derek Ogbourne, Frank Selby, Jeni Snell, Ian Whittlesea, Lucy Wood and Mary Yacoob.

=== 4x4 ===
PayneShurvell's second show 4x4 was in collaboration with Neville Brody as part of the anti-design festival - a reaction to the London Design Festival. The ten artists in 4by4 produced video, sound pieces, ready-mades, text, performance, interventions, ceramics and publications. Highlights included Daisy Delaney's Liverpool Biennial cars and till receipts as performance, a brand new typeface, a ‘pop-up museum’ in the gallery, the Bible re-written in blue biro, an army helicopter disabled by a video game hacker and the cut-up tapes of William Burroughs.

=== Wild England ===
The third show, Wild England, was a solo show by the artist Andrew Curtis who combines photographic and painterly techniques to create a series of disquieting portraits of English suburbia. Many of the works include two familiar suburban symbols: the monkey puzzle tree and the Torbay Palm. Curtis has been described as "someone who is likely to have a big impact on the art world over the years to come".

=== Welcome to Paradise ===
The fourth show was Welcome to Paradise, a solo show by Polish artist Anka Dabrowska. "Her urban eye is up there with the likes of Stephen Wiltshire, but she homes in on the details rather than the vista, and breathes life into them".

=== Substance and Accident ===
PayneShurvell's fifth show was Substance and Accident by the artist Dermot O'Brien. O’Brien’s work often takes the form of the transformation of everyday objects into something new, wonderful and often magical. He uses a visually poetic vocabulary that transcends the intended function and meaning of both the materials and the object. It is not simply an inversion but more often a true transformation. Aristotle proposed the idea of substance and accident and Thomas Aquinas further developed the idea to incorporate parts of the catholic mass.

=== CAST ===
CAST was the sixth show by artist Aidan McNeill. The work consisted of large-scale photographs of a West End musical stage. "In deconstructing the workings of the show itself, ideas of authorship and spectacle are questioned, so that the onlooker’s role takes centre stage in a complex interplay of placement, manipulation and control".

=== I Am a Fantasy ===
The seventh show was I Am a Fantasy with Margaret Harrison and The Girls, a performance art duo the Evening Standard described as: "Sexy, irreverent post-feminism. Think Angela Carter crossed with Cindy Sherman". " I Am Fantasy united the feminist pioneer with contemporary feminist art duo The Girls, in an exhibition that uses humour to explore gender identity and questions of sexuality, consumption and the male gaze".

=== Energy is Eternal Delight ===
Energy is Eternal Delight was the eighth show and was a solo show by Ian Whittlesea. Works in the exhibition included a letterpress transimile of Yves Klein’s business card in an unlimited edition and two redrawn and subtly altered versions of the frontispiece to Walden by Henry David Thoreau.

=== Your Garden is Looking a Mess Could You Please Tidy it Up ===
This 2011 show was curated by the artist Andrew Curtis and featured work by Rupert Ackroyd, Peter Blake, Leon Chew, Nicky Coutts, Greg Day, David Gates, Sarah Hardacre, Gerard Hemsworth, Marie-Jeanne Hoffner, Dick Jewell, Peter Kennard, Gerhard Lang, Bruce McLean, Niall Monroe, Jack Newling, Dermot O’Brien, Sian Pile, Rudolf Reiber, Richard Rhys, Daniel James Wilkinson.

Whilst Curtis was studying for his MA at the Royal College of Art, he was writing his research paper, his wife had just given birth and he was living in the suburbs. He woke one morning to find an anonymous note slipped under the door, reading ‘Your garden is looking a mess could you please tidy it up’.

The exhibition took as its starting point, an icon of twentieth-century design: the Marlboro flip-top cigarette box, first introduced by Phillip Morris in 1955, which in its current predicament faces a progressively imageless future. The aim of the exhibition was to explore ‘print’ in this period of re-invention, dismantling and cultural renewal. The Marlboro pack has a long history of visual appropriation, though logos and advertising are being increasingly removed. Historically, magazines, record sleeves, CD cases, book covers and other printed visual ephemera acted as a coded visual display of how we thought. They also related to the human scale. Books are being standardized by kindles, postcards, greetings cards and letters by text and email and increasingly billboards by video screens. How we identify with communication and mass printed material has irrevocably shifted.
