= Jayne Lawless =

English installation artist (born 1974)

Jayne Lawless (born 1974) is an English installation artist from Liverpool.

Lawless graduated from the University Campus Suffolk in Ipswich in 2004. Four years later, in 2008, she was a shortlisted finalist of the inaugural Liverpool Art Prize, for her work Tunnel. Tunnel was a collaboration with Polish born, New York architect, Marta Gazicka.

She then completed a post-graduate diploma course at Stass Paraskos' Cyprus College of Art in Lempa (Lemba), Paphos. Lawless attended Bath Spa University in Somerset, England, and graduated in 2011 with a Masters in Fine Arts.

Lawless has exhibited work in London, Liverpool, Suffolk, Poland and Slovakia often as part of an artist residency. She comes from an avid Liverpool Football Club supporting family, and her brother is John Lawless of former Liverpool Folk Indie duo, Tom and the Lawless.
