= Edinburgh Annuale =

The Edinburgh Annuale is a visual art festival involving Edinburgh galleries and art projects, especially ones that promote local activity in the visual arts. The Edinburgh Annuale exists to promote grassroots visual arts operations in the city.

The Annuale is co-ordinated by Edinburgh Artist Run Initiative The Embassy with a programme including publication launches, live events and exhibitions. The first Edinburgh Annuale took place in August 2004 and included exhibitions at The Embassy, Wuthering Heights, Magnifitat, The Forest Cafe and Aurora Projects. The festival has grown to include many more events and exhibitions and has some financial support from the Scottish Arts Council amongst others.

== See also ==
- Fest Magazine - Free guide to the Edinburgh Festivals

=== Other art festivals in Scotland ===
- Edinburgh Art Festival
- Big in Falkirk
