= On the Wire =

Music radio programme broadcast on BBC Radio Lancashire

On The Wire is a radio programme originally broadcast on BBC Radio Lancashire presented by Steve Barker.

== History ==
The show was first broadcast on 16 September 1984. In the 1980s the show was broadcast on Sunday afternoons 2-5pm. On the Wire's first guests were Adrian Sherwood and Keith le Blanc. Sherwood and Dub Syndicate provide the show's theme music. The guests on the second week of the show were Depeche Mode.

On the Wire was one of the first shows in the UK to play hip-hop, house music and techno music. It gave the first radio plays in the UK for Derrick May and Kevin Saunderson and the radio premier of 808 State's "Pacific State" and A Guy Called Gerald's "Voodoo Ray". Andy 'Madhatter' Holmes and Pete Haigh have provided since 1986 the once-a-month Funkology show. Michael "Fenny" Fenton has a weekly slot on the show where he plays music from the local music scene.

At the beginning of the 1990s On the Wire was under threat from the BBC, but at the last minute the show was saved by the BBC board, with the show being described as a 'unique BBC product'. Brian "Planet" Jackson and John Peel were key figures in saving the programme. When the programme was saved it moved to a new slot on Thursday evenings, and then on Saturday evenings for the rest of the show's run.

Guests on the show have included Lee Perry, Mark E Smith, Half Man Half Biscuit, Kelly Joe Phelps, Alvin Youngblood Hart, Jeb Loy Nichols and Blood and Fire. Highlight shows include: An Xmas party at the Ritz in Manchester including Sherwood with Gary Clail, 808 State, A Guy Called Gerald, Little Annie and Neneh Cherry; putting on The Fall free at Clitheroe Castle and the three hour dub special shows.

From 2003 to 2012, Steve Barker contributed from Beijing with the invaluable help of Christiaan Virant, American exile and co-founder of the China-based nu electronic unit FM3.

Engineers on the show have included Mikey Martin, Jethro (known on the net as 'Culf') and current engineer, Jim Ingham.

The forerunner to On the Wire was called Spin Off and it was broadcast on BBC Radio Blackburn (later BBC Radio Lancashire) on Tuesday and Thursday evenings from 6pm to 7pm. The programme was presented by Steve Barker and produced by Ian Cook (Education Producer).

On the Wire was terminated by the BBC in March 2020, as part of a Covid-related scaling back of BBC Local Radio services, and Barker was informed that his contract would not be renewed. On the Wire has been revived on community radio station Slack City Radio in Manchester, Brighton, Portsmouth and Norwich and continues at MixCloud.
