= Selina Thompson =

British performance artist and playwright

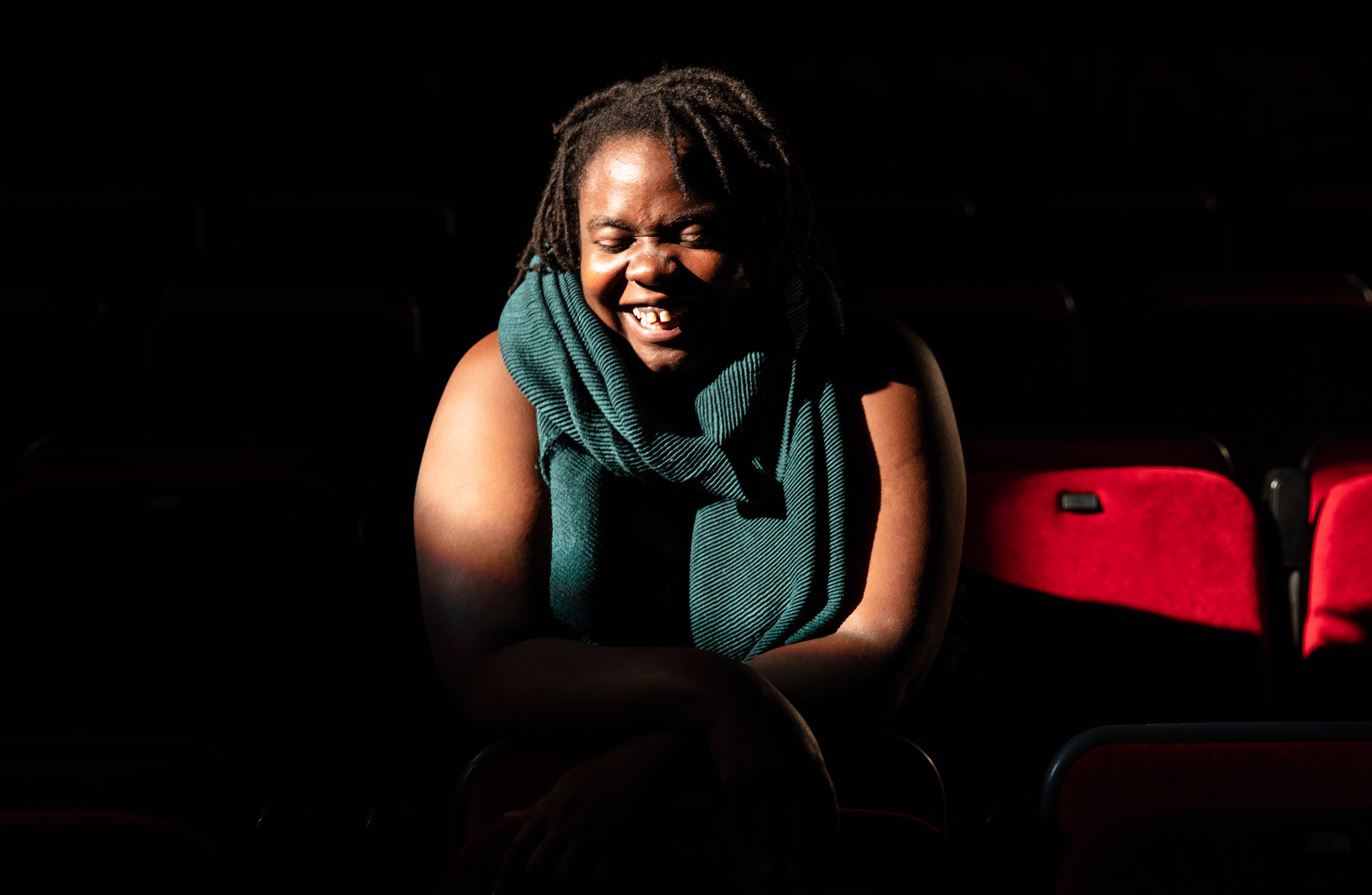
Thompson in 2018

Selina Thompson is a performance artist based in the United Kingdom. Her work is focused on the way that identity shapes our lives and intersects with politics, the environment and topics such as freedom. Her work has been shown at Spill, Fierce, Mayfest, the Birmingham REP and the West Yorkshire Playhouse. She has created work for hairdressers, toilets, galleries, pubs and theatres. Thompson is the artistic director of Selina Thompson Ltd, an interdisciplinary company creating installations, theatre shows, workshops and radio work, where she works alongside Sarah Cruickshank, Toni-Dee Paul and other collaborators.

== Key works ==
=== salt. ===
salt. is a one-woman show inspired by the artist retracing the journey she took from Britain to Ghana to Jamaica and back of the transatlantic slave triangle. The show details Thompson's own journey and experiences as well as those of the millions of black men, women and children who also undertook it. salt. explores themes such as sorrow, colonialism, ancestry and home, as a result of the two artists' experiences on board a cargo ship for a three-month voyage.

In the show Thompson wore a white dress, under which she dragged objects onto the stage under her skirt, before telling her story. During the journey retracing the transatlantic slave triangle, Thompson boarded a ship that stopped at Benin, Ivory Coast and Nigeria before dropping Thompson and her collaborator off in Ghana. Thompson experienced regular searches by officials as there were few women on the ship. Thompson documented all of her experiences on the research journey in a logbook that included conversations and reflections.

In 2019, actor Rochelle Rose took over from Thompson to perform the 70-minute piece, with Dawn Walton producing.

=== Race Cards (2014-) ===
Race Cards is written and performed as a one-woman show by Thompson who is seated at a desk, with a pen in hand, which is placed in an open space with 1000 blank pieces of card which throughout the piece she writes questions that challenges the audience to question when and are we able to speak about and discuss race honesty, openly and can it be done without bias, privilege and ignorance. Thompson, after writing the question, would place the card on the walls of the space, the audience is encouraged to write a response with red ink at the back of the card, at the end of the performance the audience is told to copy down a question to take with them and to essentially reflect on once outside of the space.

The duration of the piece can range from 12 to 24 hours long depending on what time in the day the piece begins. Race Cards is one part of a body of work that explores Black British identity titled As Wide and As Deep As The Sea which includes the other two parts of the trilogy called Dark and Lovely (2014–15) and Salt. (2016-).

The piece is designed by Bethany Wells, produced by Emma Beverly and the production managed by Louis Gregory who developed the piece with the support of BUZZCUT. Race Cards has been (re) staged at a number of venues and in a variety of contexts and forms around the UK: it was part of the Birmingham's FIERCE festival, performed at the Leeds Central Library during the Yorkshire Festival and at London's Toynbee Studios as a part of a Nation's Theatre Festival of work from a plethora of artists and places around the UK. Originally the piece had started as a theatre performance which then evolved to become a durational piece of work and a travelling installation, which is currently (winter 2019) installed at BAM in Brooklyn, New York.

Throughout the piece there are a wide variety of questions that were asked which had been numbered:

"65. Are you black, or are you 'new black'?"

"170. What is the long term psychological impact of white supremacy on people of colour?"

"307. Why do people assume that racism will just passively die out if we wait long enough?"

"440. Are you angry?"

"660. Who is more problematic – famous racist Nigel Farage, or the liberal journalist politely asking him questions?"

"720. When does it all end?"

Reviews of the piece:

"Thoughtful, generous, brave and unspeakably brilliant" – Maddy Costa

"For Race Cards, Selina Thompson devotes 12 hours to writing questions around race on postcards and sticking them on the wall. As with many of the shows at the festival, it involves an exchange: you read the questions and are invited to supply your own answers. Number 136 is: "Did you watch and enjoy The Help?" Number 73 is "I know that you are black, but why is that my fault?" From the writing on the walls, you can see how a conversation has started." – Lyn Gardner

"The work isn't about answering questions; it's about igniting an internal discussion in each of us that allows for the possibility of self-awareness, analysis and reflection." – Harold Offeh

== Awards ==
- The Stage Edinburgh Awards, 2017
- The Total Theatre Award for Innovation, Experimentation & Playing with Form, 2017
- Filipa Braganca Award for Best Female Solo Performance, 2017
- Forced Entertainment Award, 2019
