= Elizabeth Wright (artist) =

English sculptor and installation artist

Elizabeth Wright (born 1964, London) is an English sculptor and installation artist. Wright exhibited at the 1995 Venice Biennale. Two of her works, a sculpture of a bicycle called B.S.A. Tour of Britain Racer Enlarged to 135% (1996/7) and a print entitled Snowball (2000) are in the collection of the Tate Gallery.

== Notable exhibitions ==
- Karsten Schubert, London, 1995 - Wright presented a mixture of domestic and work environments, modelling the objects in unusual sizes, described as "a celebration of the versatility of human cognitive abilities."
- Delfina, London, 1999 - the artist recreated the impression of rubber-tread skidmarks on the gallery floor in a site-specific installation called C579DJD, J839TVC, A896TLP
