= John Lawless =

John Lawless may refer to:

- John Lawless (ice hockey) (born 1961), Canadian ice hockey player
- John A. Lawless, former member of the Pennsylvania House of Representatives
- John Lawless, fictional Irish character from the 1967 Walt Disney musical film The Happiest Millionaire
