= Imogen Stidworthy =

British artist

Imogen Theresa Stidworthy (born 27 September 1963) is a British multimedia artist based in Liverpool.

== Biography ==
Stidworthy has exhibited at documenta 12 and most recently her work has been shown at the Thessaloniki Biennale (2007), Shanghai Biennale(2006), “Be What You Want but Stay Where You Are” at Witte de With, Rotterdam (2005) and ‘Governmentality’ at Miami Art Central (2004). Recent solo shows include ‘Get Here’ at Galerie Hohenlohe, Vienna (2006), “Dummy” at FRAC Bourgogne, Dijon (2005) and ‘Audio Cab’, a temporary public art work installed in taxi cabs in Luton (2005).

In 2004, Stidworthy was shortlisted for the Beck's Futures prize, for a video work featuring Cilla Black impersonators. In 1996, she won the Dutch Prix de Rome.

Stidworthy is a tutor at Piet Zwart Institute, Rotterdam, Liverpool School of Art & Design and an Advising Researcher at the Jan van Eyck Akademie, Maastricht. In 2008, she won the Liverpool Art Prize

Her installation piece A Crack in the Light 2013 was part of the British Art Show 8 touring Leeds, Edinburgh, Norwich and Southampton from 2015 - 2017. Her installation 'traces connections between technologies and mechanisms of control, the act of listening and the power of the voice.'
