= Edinburgh Sculpture Workshop =

Coordinates: 55°58′43″N 3°11′26″W

Edinburgh Sculpture Workshop is a facility in Edinburgh, Scotland providing artists with studios, exhibition space and workshops.

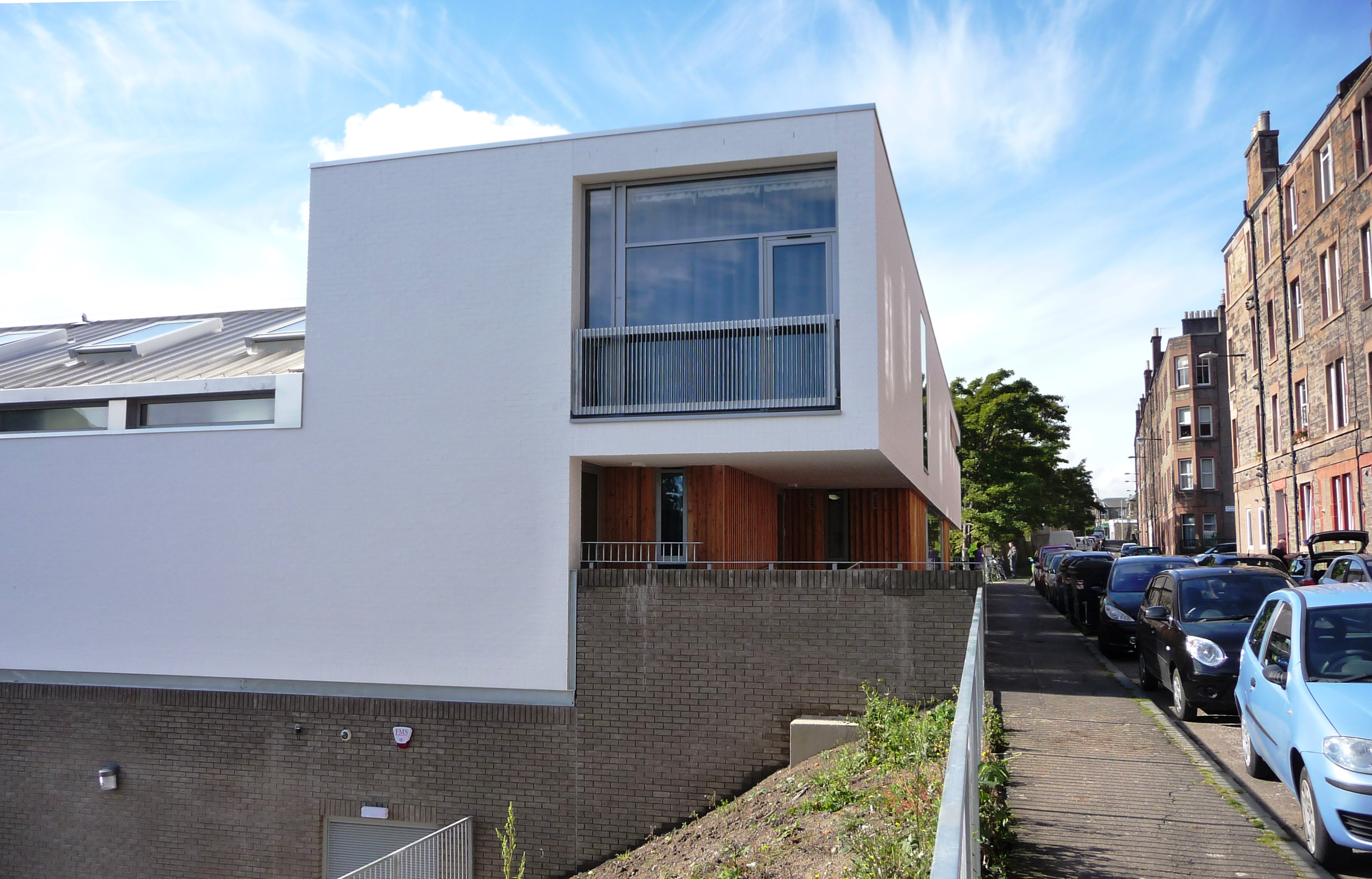
Edinburgh Sculpture Workshop

== History ==
Edinburgh Sculpture Workshop (ESW) was founded by a group of sculpture graduates from Edinburgh College of Art in 1986 as an artist-run organisation. In 1988 ESW leased 78 Albion Road in Edinburgh from WASPS Artists Studios. The organisation moved to its current site in Newhaven in 1994, and from 2003 undertook a major redevelopment project, with its current building opening in 2012.
