= Rooney (surname) =

- Pronunciation: /ˈruːni/
- Language: Irish, English

Origin
- Language: Irish
- Origin: Ó Ruanaidh; Ó Maolruanaidh
- Meaning: 'descendant of Ruanadh'
- Region of origin: Republic of Ireland

Rooney is an Irish surname originating from County Down and the Provence of Connacht. It may refer to the following people:

== Art ==
- Paul Rooney (artist), English visual and sound artist
- Sally Rooney (born 1991), Irish author

== Business ==
- J. (John) Patrick Rooney, American businessman
- Rooney Brothers, architects, builders and timber merchants in Queensland, Australia

== Media ==
- Andy Rooney (1919–2011), American journalist and commentator for CBS
- Coleen Rooney (born 1986), British television presenter
- John Rooney (sportscaster) (born 1954), American sportscaster
- Mickey Rooney (1920–2014), American actor
- Sharon Rooney (born 1988), Scottish actress
- Sherry Rooney (born 1946), American actress, known for Love of Life

== Music ==
- Adam Rooney (born 1986), British rapper known professionally as Shotty Horroh
- Cory Rooney, American songwriter and record producer
- Jim Rooney (born 1938), American music producer
- Joe Don Rooney (born 1975), country guitarist
- Kate Rooney (singer), Australian contralto
- Neil Rooney, drummer for The Polecats

== Politics ==
- Abigail Rooney, American politician
- Dougie Rooney (1947–2025), Scottish trade unionist
- Francis Rooney (born 1953) U.S. Congressman from Florida
- Fred B. Rooney (1925–2019), U.S. Congressman from Pennsylvania
- James Rooney (Canadian politician) (1897–1969), Canadian Member of Parliament
- John J. Rooney (1903–1975), U.S. Congressman from New York
- John Rooney (Irish politician), Irish Farmers's Party TD for Dublin County (1922–23)
- Terry Rooney (politician) (born 1950), English Member of Parliament for Bradford North
- T. J. Rooney (born 1964), member of Pennsylvania House of Representatives and chair of Pennsylvania Democratic Party
- Tom Rooney (Florida politician) (born 1970), U.S. Congressman from Florida
- Tom Rooney (Illinois politician) (born 1968), Illinois State Senator
- William Rooney (Irish: Liam Ó Ruanaidh), Irish nationalist, journalist, poet and Gaelic revivalist

== Sports ==
- Rooney family, owners of American football team Pittsburgh Steelers
  - Art Rooney, (1901–1988) founder and president of Pittsburgh Steelers (1933–1988)
  - Dan Rooney (1932–2017), president of Pittsburgh Steelers (1975–2002) and U.S. ambassador to Ireland (2009–2012)
  - Art Rooney II, (born 1951) president of Pittsburgh Steelers (2003–Present)
- Adam Rooney (born 1988), Irish footballer
- Declan Rooney (born 1983/1984), Irish Gaelic footballer
- Giaan Rooney (born 1982), Australian swimmer and gold medalist at the 2004 Summer Olympics
- Jamie Rooney (born 1980), English rugby league player, currently with Wakefield Trinity Wildcats
- Jamie Rooney (lacrosse) (born 1984), lacrosse player
- Jim Rooney (born 1968), retired soccer player
- John Rooney (footballer) (born 1990), English footballer
- John Rooney (squash player) (born 1979), Irish squash player
- Kate Rooney (born Kate Dennison, 1984), English pole vaulter
- Kevin Rooney (born 1993), American ice hockey player
- Luke Rooney (born 1983), Australian retired rugby league and rugby union player
- Luke Rooney (footballer) (born 1990), English footballer
- Maddie Rooney (born 1997), American ice hockey player
- Martyn Rooney (born 1987), English sprinter
- Sean Rooney (born 1982), American volleyball player
- Shaun Rooney (born 1996), Scottish footballer
- Terry Rooney (born 1973), American college baseball coach
- Tom Rooney (racing driver) (1881–1939), American racing driver
- Walter Rooney (ice hockey) (1888–1965), professional ice hockey player for the Quebec Bulldogs
- Wayne Rooney (born 1985), English football manager and former player

== Other ==
- Jane Rooney, New Zealand architect
