= Atelierhaus Salzamt =

- Atelierhaus Salzamt
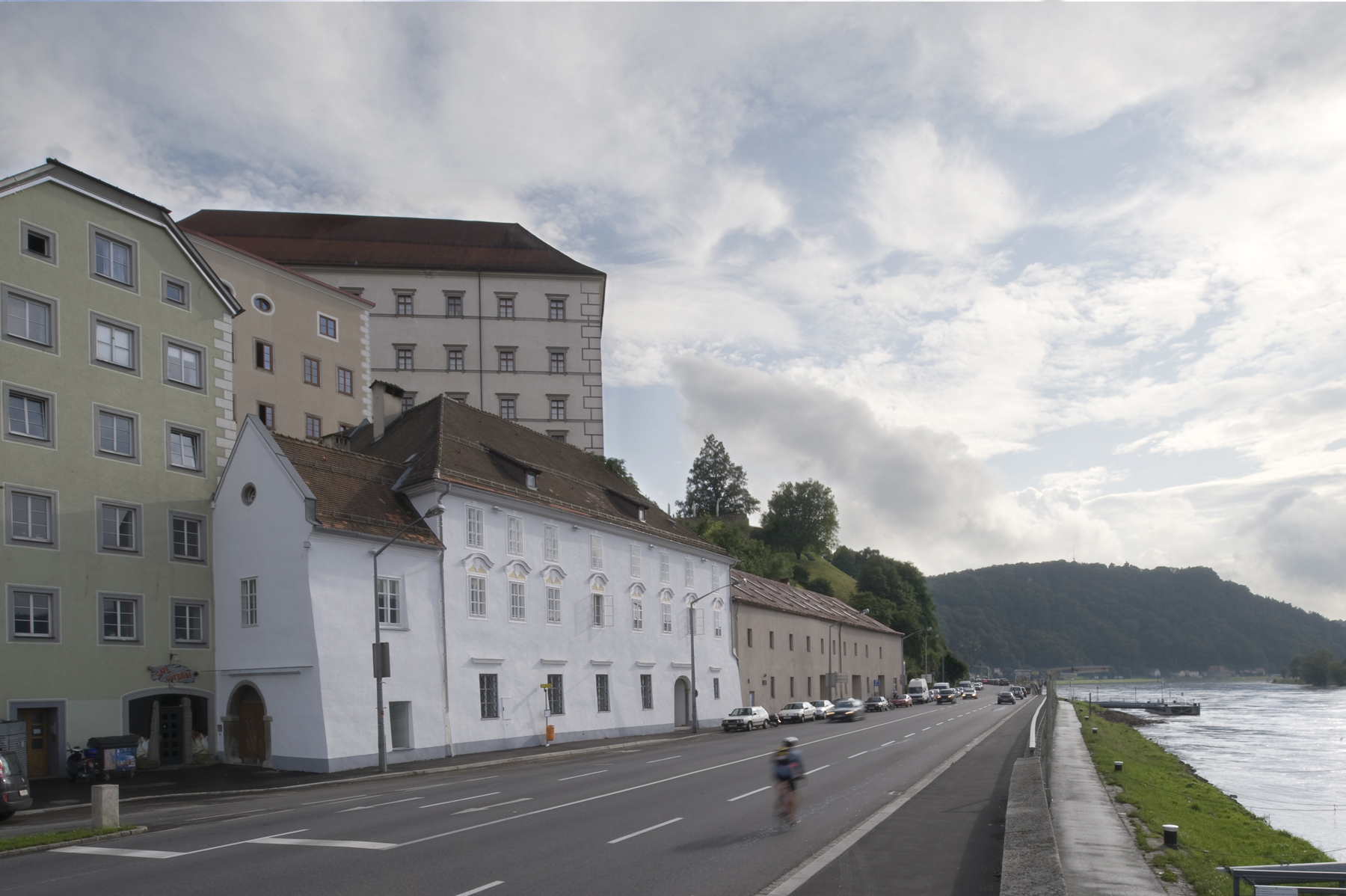
- The house is located on the south bank of the Danube beneath the Linz Castle
- Established: 2009
- Location: Linz, Austria
- Coordinates: 48.306359°N 14.283191°E
- Type: Cultural institution
- Website: Atelierhaus Salzamt Linz

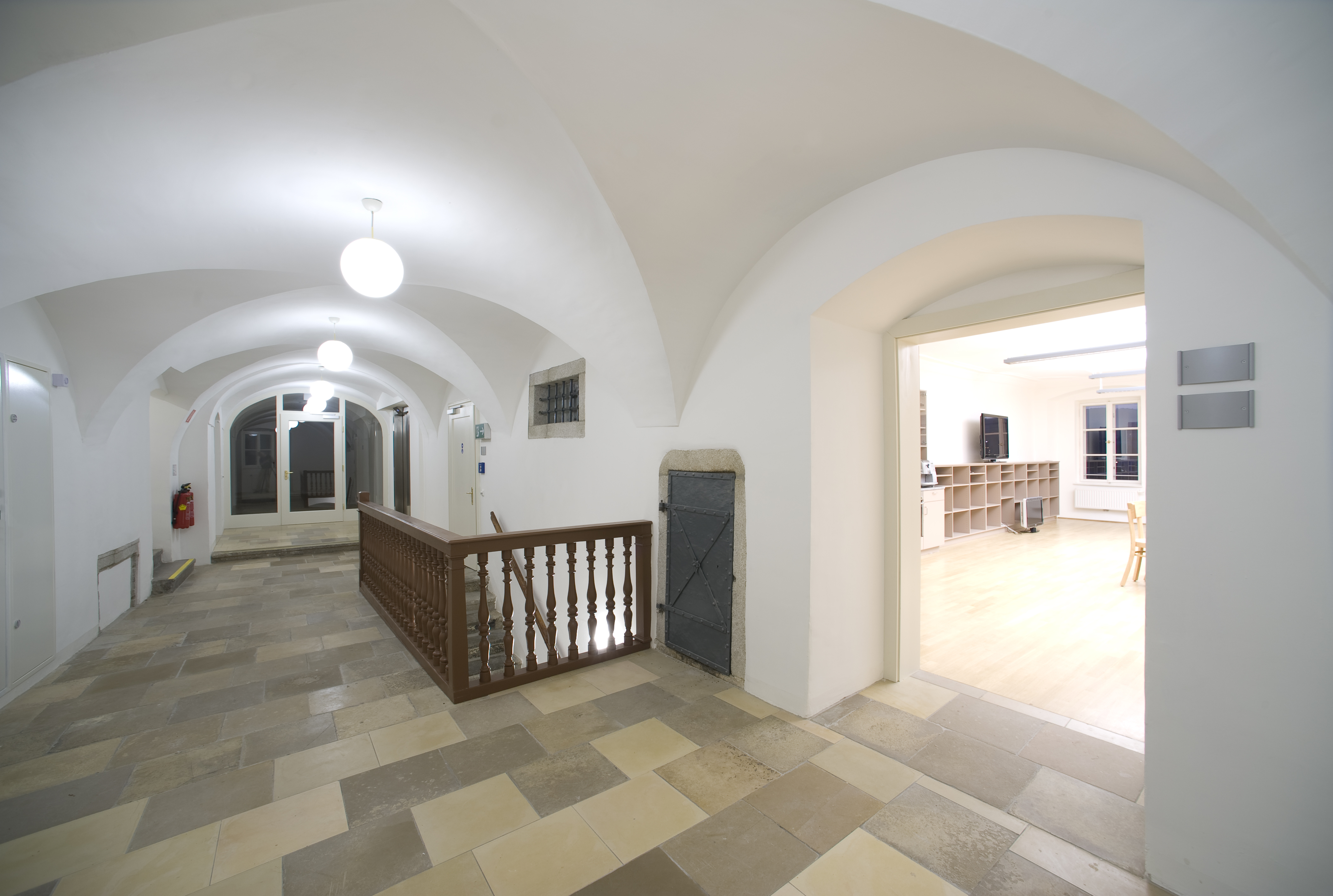
Aisle with vaulted ceiling and view to common room

The Atelierhaus Salzamt, which translates to "Studio House Salt Authority," is a cultural institution founded in 2009 in Linz, Austria. Its core mission is to promote and enrich international exchange programs in the visual arts field. The facility serves various roles, acting as an art gallery, offering accommodation for artists, and providing studio space to both local and international artists.

== History ==
The building was constructed in 1706 as a Salzamt, an imperial authority that regulated the salt trade in Austria.

Typical of its time and area, it has many baroque architectural features, like cross-vaulted ceilings. The outside walls are built on the former city walls and are up to two meters thick.

In preparation for its designation as the European Capital of Culture in 2009, the city of Linz embarked on a renovation project for a notable building, with a budget of four million euros. Due to the building's status as a protected landmark, the renovation efforts were primarily concentrated on preserving its original structural elements. This included maintaining the authentic stucco ceilings and wooden floorboards in numerous rooms. Additionally, a basement was constructed to accommodate the building's utilities and sanitary installations, thereby rendering the building more functional as a residential space.

== The Studio House ==
The Atelierhaus Salzamt serves as a hub for emerging visual artists, both from Austria and around the world. This establishment houses a total of nine studios designated for artistic purposes. Additionally, the facility extends its support by offering four international artists residencies, each accompanied by a modest apartment and a private studio, at no expense to the artists.

In addition, international guest artists receive a monthly stipend to cover living costs. Studios and apartments are also rented out to the Province of Upper Austria, University of Art and Design Linz and Ars Electronica. Four further studios without apartments attached are given to local artists from Linz and Upper Austria.

In order to document the international artistic exchange and to engage with the public, there are regular exhibitions, lectures, discussions, presentations and screenings in the ground floor exhibition and event spaces.
