= Paul Rooney (artist) =

English artist (born 1967)

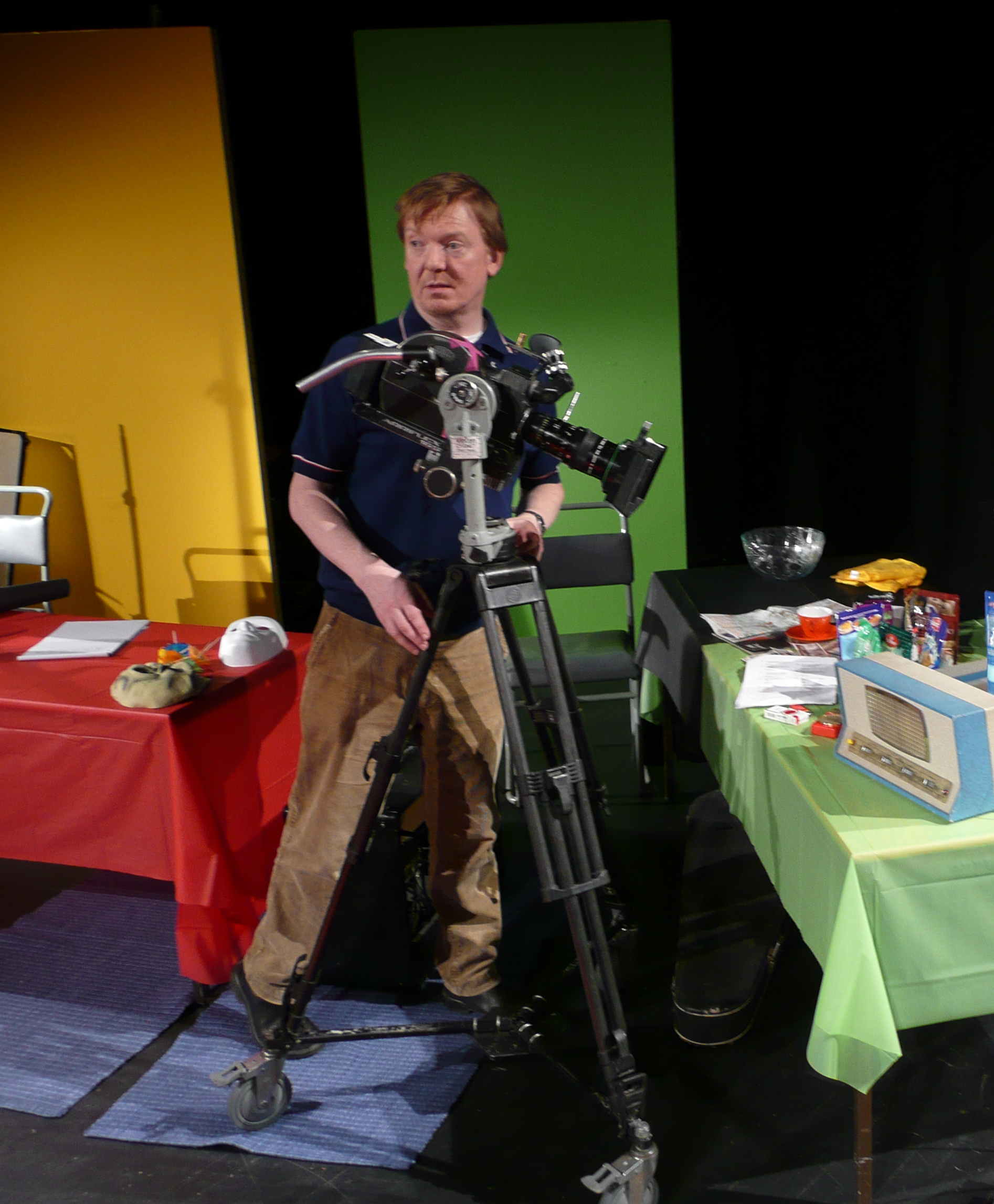
- Born: 1967 (age 58–59); Liverpool, England
- Education: Edinburgh College of Art
- Occupation: Artist
- Notable work: Lucy Over Lancashire
- Awards: Northern Art Prize (2008)
- Website: www.paulrooney.info

Paul Rooney (born 1967 in Liverpool) is an English artist who works with music and words, primarily through installations and records.

He studied painting at Edinburgh College of Art. In the late 1990s his art practice shifted from painting to video and music, initially with the artist group Common Culture and then the band Rooney. His work later focussed on sound and music within video works, installations and performances.

His art works often explore the difficulties inherent in the representation of place, mixing unreliable narratives of personal experience and urban myth.

Awards include an Abbey Award in Painting at The British School at Rome in 1995, Art Prize North in 2003, the Northern Art Prize in 2008, and the Morton Award for Lens Based Work (2012). His works have been purchased for the Arts Council Collection and through the Contemporary Art Society Acquisitions Scheme.

== Work ==
The three CD music albums released from 1998 to 2000 under the band name Rooney (not the later US band of the same name) were broadcast by BBC Radio 1 (John Peel Show) amongst others, and the track Went to Town reached number 44 in John Peel's Festive Fifty of 1998. Rooney became a live band in time to record a Peel session in 1999.

Paul Rooney continued to perform or work with other musicians in the early 2000s, such as The NWRA House Band, touring a 'variety night' and a 'rock opera' amongst other performance projects. His gallery works — now primarily sound and music based installations but also including video and writing — developed through commissions for organisations such as Sound and Music and Film and Video Umbrella, and through a period of residencies and fellowships at institutions including Durham University; University of Dundee; Tate Liverpool; Proyecto Batiscafo, Havana; Oxford University; University of Melbourne; and University of Wolverhampton.

Electric Earth: Film and Video from Britain, a British Council exhibition which toured internationally from 2003, included early music/video work by Rooney. In 2004 he curated Pass the Time of Day, a UK touring exhibition dealing with the relationship between music and 'the everyday'. Pass the Time of Day included works by Arab Strap, Rodney Graham and Susan Philipsz amongst others. The following year Rooney's work was selected for the survey show British Art Show 6, which toured the UK in 2005–2006. Rooney had solo shows at venues such as Site Gallery, Sheffield (a two-person show with Susan Philipsz, 2003); and Matt's Gallery, London (2008).

He returned to releasing records in 2007 with the red vinyl 12" Lucy Over Lancashire, on SueMi Records of Berlin. Released under his full name of 'Paul Rooney', it was specifically made for broadcast on BBC Radio Lancashire, but BBC Radio 1 and BBC 6 Music were amongst the other stations who broadcast the piece.

In 2012 Rooney had a solo show in the Liverpool Biennial official programme, and also that year Dust and Other Stories, a collection of short fiction published by Akerman Daly/Aye-Aye Books, was published. The Rooney Peel session was repeated in 2016 on Gideon Coe's BBC 6 Music show, and in 2017 Rooney's first album for seventeen years, Futile Exorcise, was released on Owd Scrat Records on transparent vinyl. The album was on Stewart Lee's list of best records of 2017 and a track from it, Lost High Street, reached number 1 on the 2017 Festive Fifty (now compiled by Dandelion Radio). Along with further record releases he also began to create sited sound installations in historic locations such as Ripon Courthouse (2019) and Lindisfarne Castle (2022-2023).
