= Tessa Lynch =

British artist

Tessa Lynch (born 1984 in Epsom, Surrey) is a British artist. She lives and works in Glasgow, Scotland. She mimics objects and scenarios found in the urban landscape, charting the emotional impact of our built environment and the structures that shape it. Connected research spans from investigating the existence of the female flaneur/flâneuse through to activism and town planning.

== Life and education ==
After time studying at Camberwell College of Arts, and an exchange at Kyoto Saga University of Arts, Lynch graduated from Edinburgh College of Art in 2007, with a BA in Tapestry, and received an MFA from Glasgow School of Art in 2013.

== Exhibitions and projects ==
Solo projects and exhibitions include L-Shaped Room at Spike Island, Bristol (2017), Wave Machine, David Dale, Glasgow (2016); Painters Table, Gallery of Modern Art, Glasgow as part of Glasgow International Director's Programme (2016); Café Concrete, Glasgow Sculpture Studios, Glasgow (2014); and, Raising, Jupiter Artland, Edinburgh as part of GENERATION (2014).

Other exhibitions and projects include NOW, Scottish National Gallery of Modern Art, Edinburgh; EAT, SLEEP, WORK, REPEAT, The Travelling Gallery, various locations throughout Scotland (all 2017); Trigger Words, Glasgow Print Studios, Glasgow; Green Belt, Whitstable Biennale, Kent; Condo London (with Frutta Gallery, Rome), Southard Reid, London (all 2016); Over, Over, Over, Simone de Sousa, Detroit (2015); Mood is Made/ Temperature is Taken, curated by Quinn Latimer for GENERATION, Glasgow Sculpture Studios, Glasgow (2014); Fall Scenes, Glasgow School of Art MFA Post-Degree Project, Fleming House, Glasgow (2013); and, Performing Sculpture, Scottish National Gallery of Modern Art, Edinburgh (2012).

Tessa Lynch is currently working with Collective Gallery, Edinburgh and landscape architects Harrison Stevens on elements of the redesign of the Collective landscape on Edinburgh's historic Calton Hill.
