= Rachel Maclean (artist) =

Scottish multi-media artist

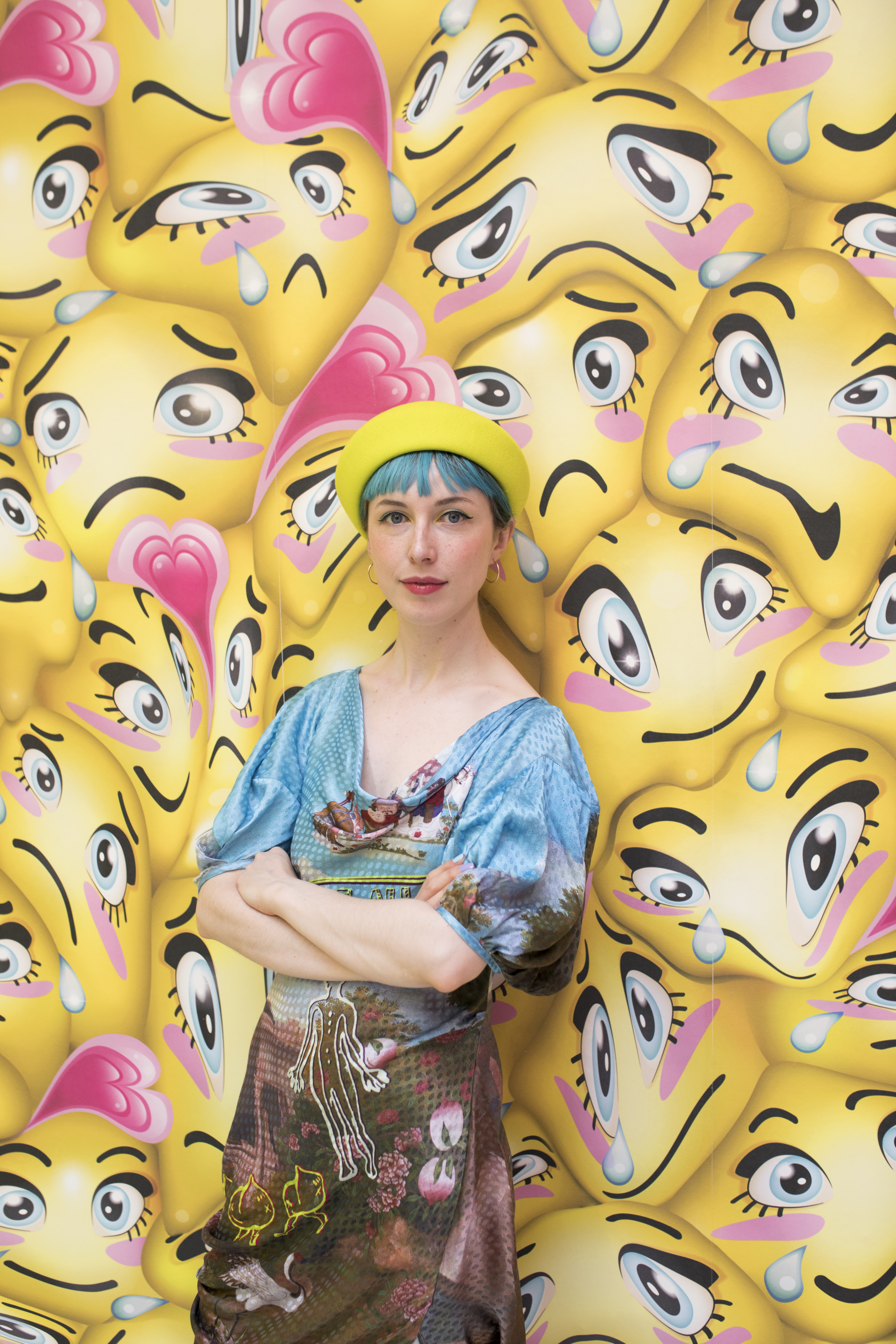
- Maclean in 2021
- Born: Edinburgh, Scotland
- Education: Edinburgh College of Art
- Style: Video art
- Awards: Margaret Tait Award (2013)
- Website: https://www.rachelmaclean.com/

Rachel Maclean (born 1987) is a Scottish visual artist and filmmaker.

She lives and works in Glasgow.

Her films have shown widely in galleries, museums, film festivals, and on television. She has screened work at numerous festivals in the UK and internationally, including Rotterdam International Film Festival, Ars Electronica, Fantastic Fest, Mecal Pro, Fantasia Film Festival, and BFI London Film Festival. She has received significant acclaim with solo shows at Tate Britain and The National Gallery, London, and represented Scotland at the 2017 Venice Biennale with her film Spite Your Face. Her work A Whole New World (2014) won the Margaret Tait Award in 2013. She has twice been shortlisted for the Jarman Award, and achieved widespread critical praise for Feed Me at the British Art Show in 2016.

Maclean is also a NUAcT Research Fellow at Newcastle University.

== Early life and education ==
Maclean was born in Edinburgh.

She has a BA in Drawing and Painting from Edinburgh College of Art.

== Career ==
Maclean was selected to represent Scotland in Venice at the 57th International Art Exhibition of the Venice Biennale, 2017. This solo presentation of new work centred on a major new film commission. The work was based on the story of Pinocchio. The presentation is commissioned and curated by Alchemy Film & Arts in partnership with Talbot Rice Gallery and the University of Edinburgh.

In 2021, Maclean created Upside Down Mimi, her first permanent outdoor commission at Jupiter Artland sculpture park in Scotland. The installation combined both architecture and animation and a replica toured Scottish city centres in spaces that would have been shops. The work explored ideas of consumer desire. The building looks like a derelict shop, and inside is the character Mimi, represented by dolls and a video at the back of the space. Maclean was influenced by the story of Hansel and Gretel in making the work. Jupiter Artland commissioned the work, and also facilitated Maclean working with a school group, which influenced the development of the work. The character of Mimi is an exploration of chasing and living up to unachievable female beauty standards.

== Work ==
Tom Sutcliffe on BBC Radio 4's Front Row described Maclean's work as "patrolling an uncanny territory between innocence and dread, between guilelessly cute and childlike and something far more unsettling". She has said she wants to make people feel uncomfortable by her work, to challenge people's conceptions. She sees her work as political, and is interested in exploring national identity, political identity and gender identity through her work.

Maclean uses a lot of green screen in both her video and 2D prints to compile images. She usually plays all the roles in her video works.

Her work Make Me Up took audio from Kenneth Clark's Civilisation. The work contrasted this "old-school, sort of paternal style of television and...juxtaposing it against something more like a reality TV show" The work also explores more broadly the patriarchal idea of civilisation, and who that idea serves.

Maclean produces elaborate films and digital prints using extravagant costume, over-the-top make-up, green screen visual effects and electronic soundtracks. Using film and photography, she creates outlandish characters and fantasy worlds which she uses to delve into politics, society and identity. Wearing colourful costumes and make-up, Maclean often takes on every role in her films herself. She uses computer technology to generate her locations, and borrows audio from television and cinema to construct narratives with a comedic touch.

Maclean's artwork is both seductive and disturbing, it sucks the viewer into oversaturated candy coloured worlds and repels them with unsettling themes and narratives. She explores issues of identity, class, nationalism and gender, whilst referencing narrative structures from pop culture and fairy-tales.

Some of Maclean's work explores ideas of Scottish identity. Her work The Lion and the Unicorn (2012), for example, was made in response to the election of the SNP in 2011, and the referendum that was on the horizon. She wanted to explore "a romantic vision of Scottishness, and how we reconcile that with a real lived experience of Scottishness, and what relationship that has in Scottish Nationalism and also with Unionism". The characters in the film are based on the heraldic symbols for the United Kingdom: the lion as England and the unicorn as Scotland. Maclean played both characters. She used audio taken from speeches by David Cameron, Alex Salmond and the Queen, and mimed along with them. The exhibition also featured digital prints.

A lot of Maclean's work uses parody as a technique.

== Exhibitions ==
=== Solo exhibitions ===
Year	Title	Venue	Location	Notes	Ref.
2012		Generator Projects	Dundee		
2013		Trade Gallery	Nottingham		
		Collective Gallery	Edinburgh		
		Edinburgh Printmakers	Edinburgh		
2014		Zabludowicz Collection	London		
2016		HOME	Manchester		
2017		Tate Britain	London		
2017		Scotland in Venice, Venice Biennale	Venice		
2018		Dublin City Art Gallery	Dublin		
		KWM Arts Centre	Beijing		
		National Gallery of Australia	Canberra		
		Zabludowicz Collection	London		
2019		The National Gallery	London		
			New York		
		Tel Aviv Museum of Art	Israel		
2020		Arsenal Contemporary, Kunsthalle zu Kiel	Germany		
2021		Jupiter Artland	Edinburgh		
2023		Kunstpalais Erlangen	Germany		
2024		Kunsthalle Giessen	Germany		

=== Group exhibitions ===
Year	Title	Venue	Location	Notes	Ref.
		State Museum of Urban Sculpture	St Petersburg		
		Kunstarkaden	Munich		
		Talbot Rice Gallery	Edinburgh		
		Royal Scottish Academy	Edinburgh		
		British Art Show 8		Feed Me	

== Awards ==
Year	Award	Work	Result	Ref.
2013	Margaret Tait Award	For her contribution to Glasgow Film Festival	Won	
	Film London Jarman Award		Nominated	
	Film London Jarman Award		Nominated	
	Prix Ars Electronica	DUCK (2024)	Honorary Mention	
	International Federation of Film Critics Award (FIPRESCI)	Make Me Up (2018)	Won	
