= Alberta Whittle =

Barbadian-Scottish artist (born 1980)

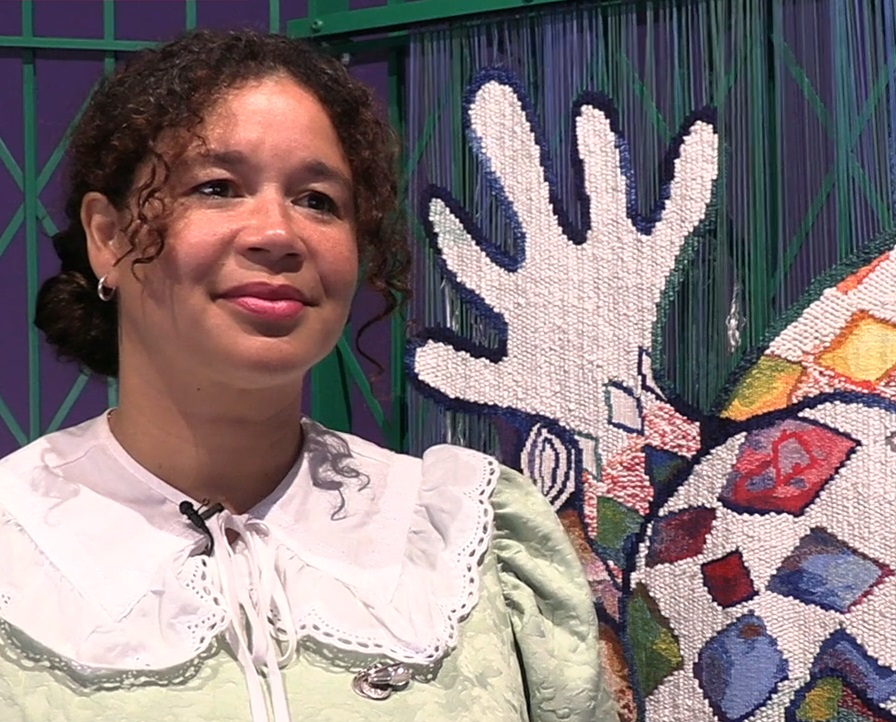
- Alberta Whittle Deep Dive (Pause) Uncoiling Memory – Venice Biennale, 2022
- Born: 1980 (age 45–46); Bridgetown, Barbados
- Education: Glasgow School of Art, Edinburgh College of Art
- Awards: Margaret Tait Award in 2018; Frieze Artist Award, 2020; recipient of Turner Prize bursary, 2020
- Website: www.albertawhittlestudio.com

Alberta Whittle (born 1980, Bridgetown, Barbados) is a Barbadian-Scottish multidisciplinary artist who works across media: film, sculpture, print, installation and performance. She lives and works in Glasgow. She was the winner of the Margaret Tait Award in 2018, winner of the Frieze Artist Award in 2020, received a Turner Prize bursary, also in 2020, and represented Scotland at the 59th International Art Exhibition – La Biennale di Venezia in 2022.

== Life and education ==
Whittle was born and grew up in Barbados, moving to Birmingham as a teenager, and later to Scotland to study. She gained an MFA from Glasgow School of Art and a PhD from Edinburgh College of Art in 2024. She was a research associate at the Visual Identities in Art and Design Research Centre, situated at the University of Johannesburg.

== Work ==
Alberta Whittle's work is concerned with questioning how history and society are constructed in the Western world. Her practice takes on the legacies of colonialism and slavery, and reflects upon black oppression and the way in which the racialised black body can carry markers of such oppression that may play out in an individual's mental or physical health. Her work is also concerned with environmental issues such as the climate crisis.

Whittle talks about her move to the UK from the Caribbean as something that, for her, drew attention to the inequalities in the way in which history is captured and told by different nations. She says: 'I was really quite shocked, moving to the UK, going to school in Birmingham, and living and studying in Scotland, by how there was an acute absence of conversation or acknowledgement in terms of these intricate and uneasy relationships between Europe and the Americas, or Asia, or Africa. [...] The privilege in avoiding these histories is something I found shocking and, I guess, hurtful. [...] That level of inattention definitely galvanises so much of my work.'

== Selected exhibitions ==
=== Solo exhibitions ===
- Alberta Whittle: Business as Usual, Tyburn Gallery, London (31 May - 27 June 2019)
- Alberta Whittle: How Flexible Can We Make the Mouth, Dundee Contemporary Arts, Dundee (14 September - 24 November 2019)
- Alberta Whittle: RESET, Jupiter Artland, Scotland, (31 July - 31 October 2021)
- Alberta Whittle: Deep Dive (Pause) Uncoiling Memory, Scotland in Venice, Docks Cantieri Cucchini at the 59th Venice Biennale, Venice (23 April – 27 November 2022)

=== Group exhibitions ===
- WHERE WE'RE AT: Other voices on gender, BOZAR, Brussels (18 June - 31 August 2014),
- Johannesburg Pavilion at the 56th Venice Biennale, Venice (9 May - 22 November 2015)
- Embodied Spaces, FRAMER FRAMED, Amsterdam (18 June - 26 July 2015)
- Inner City, GoMA, Glasgow (16 February - 11 November 2018)
- there's something in the conversation that is more interesting than the finality of (a title), The Showroom, London (28 March - 5 May 2018)
- Stalking The Image: Margaret Tait and Her Legacy, GoMA, Glasgow (8 November 2018 - 5 May 2019)
- Alberta Whittle and Emilio Bianchic, Useless, Pig Rock Bothy, Scottish National Gallery of Modern Art, Edinburgh (13 - 21 April 2019)
- 13th Havana Biennale, Cuba (12 April - 12 May 2019)
- Alberta Whittle and Hardeep Pandhal, Transparency, Edinburgh Printmakers, Edinburgh (18 October 2019 - 5 January 2020)
- Sonia Boyce: In the Castle of my Skin, Eastside Projects, Birmingham (25 January - 11 April 2020, original dates, disrupted due to COVID-19 pandemic)
- Here Be Dragons, Copperfield, London (22 September - 31 October 2020)
- between a whisper and a cry, Open Eye Gallery for Liverpool Biennial 11th Edition (20 March - 27 June 2021, original dates disrupted due to COVID-19 pandemic)
- Life Support: Forms of Care in Art and Activism, Glasgow Women's Library, (14 August - 16 October 2021)

== Collections ==
Alberta Whittle's work is part of the following collections:

- The National Galleries of Scotland collections
- Glasgow Museums Collections
- The UK Arts Council Collection
- University of St Andrews
- The Contemporary Art Research Collection at Edinburgh College of Art

== Awards ==
- Margaret Tait Award, 2018 with the video work between a whisper and a cry
- Frieze Artist Award, 2020
- Turner Prize bursary, 2020
- Henry Moore Foundation Artist Award, 2020
