= Margaret Tait Award =

Moving image prize for artists living and working in Scotland

The Margaret Tait Award is a moving image prize for artists living and working in Scotland. It is named after the Orcadian filmmaker and writer Margaret Tait (1918–99). Recipients of the award have included Alberta Whittle, Charlotte Prodger, Rachel Maclean and Torsten Lauschmann.

== History ==
The Margaret Tait Award was established in 2010 by Glasgow Film, LUX Scotland, supported by Screen Scotland. The Award is presented annually to a Scottish or Scotland-based artist working in moving image who has produced a significant body of work in the last 5 to 12 years. The winner is awarded £15,000 to produce new work, which is exhibited at the next Glasgow Film Festival.

== Selection process ==
Artists are selected based on an open call. The winner is decided by a selected jury.

== Award winners ==
- 2010: Torsten Lauschmann, At The Heart of Everything is a Row of Holes (Shortlisted: Aileen Campbell, Sarah Tripp, Henry Coombes, Alexander and Susan Maris)
- 2011: Anne-Marie Copestake, And Under That
- 2012: Stephen Sutcliffe, Outwork (Shortlisted: Calum Stirling, Katri Walker, Rachel MacLean, Stina Wirfelt and Stuart Gurden)
- 2013: Rachel Maclean, A Whole New World (Shortlisted: Michelle Hannah, Rob Kennedy, Sophie Macpherson, Gillian Steel, Sarah Tripp, and Stina Wirfelt)
- 2014: Charlotte Prodger, The Stoneymollan Trail (Shortlisted: Allison Gibbs, Beagles and Ramsay, Kari Robertson, Kathryn Elkin and Katy Dove)
- 2015: Duncan Marquiss, Evolutionary Jerks and Gradualist Creeps (Shortlisted: Kathryn Elkin, Rob Kennedy, and Hardeep Pandhal)
- 2016: Kate Davis, Charity (Shortlisted: Aideen Doran, Hardeep Pandhal, Catherine Street and Stina Wirfelt)
- 2017: Sarah Forrest, April (Shortlisted: Jamie Crewe, Margaret Salmon and Kimberley O’Neill)
- 2018: Alberta Whittle, between a whisper and a cry (Shortlisted: Aideen Doran, Rob Kennedy and Corin Sworn)
- 2019: Jamie Crewe, Ashley (Shortlisted: Winnie Herbstein, Margaret Salmon and Stuart Middleton)
- 2020: Emilia Beatriz (Shortlisted: Sulaïman Majali, Kimberley O’Neill, and Hardeep Pandhal)
- 2021: Andrew Black, The Besom (Shortlisted: Christian Noelle Charles, Winnie Herbstein, Mathew Wayne Parkin and Tako Taal)
