= British Art Show =

The British Art Show (BAS) is a major survey exhibition organised every five years to showcase contemporary British Art. Each time it is organised, the show tours to four UK cities. It usually requires a number of venues in each city to accommodate it. As a snapshot of contemporary British Art, the exhibition has some equivalence to the biennial exhibitions of the Whitney Museum of American Art.

The exhibition is normally curated by two or three people who are appointed for their knowledge of contemporary art. Previously these had been artists and critics, but more recently they have been curators.

The 1990 show caused controversy as it did not include any Scottish artists, even though it opened in Glasgow as part of the city's European Capital of Culture programme.

The 1995 show, curated by Richard Cork, Rose Finn-Kelcey and Thomas Lawson, was highly regarded as it spotlighted the emergence of the Young British Artists.

== British Art Show 1 (1979–1980) ==
The inaugural British Art Show (retrospectively known as British Art Show 1) was a major survey exhibition of contemporary British painting and sculpture organised by the Arts Council of Great Britain. Selected by art critic William Packer, it opened at the Mappin Art Gallery in Sheffield on 1 December 1979 before touring to Newcastle upon Tyne and Bristol through 24 May 1980. Presenting work by 112 artists, the exhibition established the foundation for what became the quinquennial British Art Show series.

Among the 112 participating artists were Frank Bowling, Anthony Caro, Lucian Freud, David Hockney, Howard Hodgkin, Leon Kossoff, Janet Nathan, and Bridget Riley, reflecting the breadth of contemporary British art represented in the survey.

== British Art Show 5 (2000) ==
The 2000 show was selected by Jacqui Poncelet, Pippa Coles and Matthew Higgs, and included more than 50 artists. Selected artists were:Andrews Lea, Art & Language, Barlow Phyllida, Batchelor David, Boyce Martin, Brown Glenn, Childish Billy, Creed Martin, Deller Jeremy & Holmquist Karl, Emin Tracey, Fagen Graham, Ford Laura, Gillik Liam, Graham Paul, Gunning Lucy, Gussin Graham, Higgs Matthew, Hiller Susan, Hockney David, Hughes Dean, Hunt Anna, Islam Runa, Kay Emma, Key Joan, Lambie Jim, Landy Michael, Lloyd Hilary, Lowe Rachel, Lucas Sarah, Macleod Kenny, McCail Chad, McFeely Conor, Mckenzie Lucy, Musgrave David, Nelson Mike, Noble Paul, Parsons Jonathan, Perry Grayson, Prendergast Kathy, Raedecker Michael, Rego Paula, Rhoades Carol, Rodney Donald, Seawright Paul, Shrigley David, Spencer Johnny, Starling Simon, Stezaker John, Tillmans Wolfgang, Timoney Padraig, Toren Amikam, Tyson Keith, Wood John & Wood Paul, Wright Richard, Wyn Evan Cerith

== British Art Show 6 (2005) ==
BAS 6 in 2005 was in the Baltic Centre for Contemporary Art, Gateshead. It was curated by Andrea Schlieker and Alex Farquharson and included a large number of artists born outside the UK. As the exhibition opened in Gateshead, concern was voiced that few of the artists came from the North East of England. It then travelled to Manchester (January–April), Nottingham (April–June) and Bristol (July–September).

Participating artists: Tomma Abts, Haluk Akakçe, Phillip Allen, Tonico Lemos Auad, Claire Barclay, Anna Barriball, Breda Beban, Zarina Bhimji, Ergin Çavusoglu, Gordon Cheung, Marcus Coates, Adam Chodzko, Nathan Coley – Phil Collins – Neil Cummings and Marysia Lewandowska, Enrico David, Chris Evans, Doug Fishbone, Siobhán Hapaska, Roger Hiorns, Matthew Houlding, Richard Hughes, Marine Hugonnier, Gareth Jones, juneau/projects/, Kerstin Kartscher, Janice Kerbel, Mark Leckey, Hew Locke, Christina Mackie, Goshka Macuga, Daria Martin, Andrew McDonald, Heather and Ivan Morison, Rosalind Nashashibi, Nils Norman, Saskia Olde Wolbers, Silke Otto-Knapp, Toby Paterson, public works, Paul Rooney, Eva Rothschild, Zineb Sedira, Lucy Skaer, Alia Syed, David Thorpe, Mark Titchner, Rebecca Warren, Gary Webb and Carey Young.

== British Art Show 7: In the Days of the Comet (2010) ==
The British Art Show is widely recognised as the most ambitious and influential exhibition of contemporary British art. Organised by Hayward Touring, it takes place every five years and tours to four different cities across the UK. Its seventh incarnation opened in Nottingham, and toured for the first time in 20 years to the Hayward Gallery at Southbank Centre, followed by venues in Glasgow and Plymouth. It was curated by Lisa Le Feuvre and Tom Morton.

The 39 artists were selected on the grounds of their significant contribution to contemporary art in the previous five years. All included artworks were produced between 2005 and 2010, and encompassed sculpture, painting, installation, drawing, photography, film, video, and performance, with many artists creating new works especially for the exhibition. British Art Show 7 marked a change in direction from previous years, moving away from the model of a survey show to an exhibition with a marked curatorial focus.

"The British Art Show has always been at the forefront of innovation, and this incarnation is no exception." Ralph Rugoff, Director of the Hayward Gallery.

Subtitled In the Days of the Comet, British Art Show 7 employed the motif of the comet to explore and draw together a set of concerns that thread their way through the practices of the selected artists. Here the comet alludes to the measuring of time, to historical recurrence, and to parallel worlds. Comets are also commonly understood as harbingers of change, and fittingly the exhibition evolved as it moved from city to city, revealing new works at different venues, creating a unique exhibition in each location.

"We are interested in the recurrent nature of the comet as a symbol of how each version of the present collides with the past and the future, and the work of the artists in British Art Show 7, in many different ways, contests assumptions of how ‘the now’ might be understood." Lisa Le Feuvre and Tom Morton, Curators of British Art Show 7.

The selected artists were Charles Avery, Karla Black, Becky Beasley, Juliette Blightman, Duncan Campbell, Varda Caivano, Spartacus Chetwynd, Steven Claydon, Cullinan Richards, Matthew Darbyshire, Milena Dragicevic, Luke Fowler, Michael Fullerton, Alasdair Gray, Brian Griffiths, Roger Hiorns, Ian Kiaer, Kirschner & Panos, Sarah Lucas, Christian Marclay, Simon Martin, Nathaniel Mellors, Haroon Mirza, David Noonan, The Otolith Group, Mick Peter, Gail Pickering, Olivia Plender, Elizabeth Price, Karin Ruggaber, Edgar Schmitz, Maaike Schoorel, George Shaw, Wolfgang Tillmans, Sue Tompkins, Phoebe Unwin, Tris Vonna Michell, Emily Wardill, Keith Wilson.

== British Art Show 8 (2015) ==
Curated by Anna Colin and Lydia Yee, British Art Show 8 was scheduled to open in October 2015 at Leeds Art Gallery, and tour to venues in Edinburgh, Norwich and Southampton.

The artists in British Art Show 8 are: Abake, Lawrence Abu Hamdan, Caroline Achaintre, John Akomfrah and Trevor Mathison, Aaron Angell, Pablo Bronstein, Adam Broomberg and Oliver Chanarin, Andrea Büttner, Alexandre da Cunha, Nicolas Deshayes, Benedict Drew, Simon Fujiwara, Martino Gamper, Ryan Gander, Melanie Gilligan, Anthea Hamilton, Will Holder, Alan Kane, Mikhail Karikis, Linder, Rachel Maclean, Ahmet Ogut, Yuri Pattison, Ciara Phillips, Charlotte Prodger, Laure Prouvost, Magali Reus, James Richards, Eileen Simpson and Ben White, Daniel Sinsel, Cally Spooner, Patrick Staff, Imogen Stidworthy, Hayley Tompkins, Jessica Warboys, Stuart Whipps, Bedwyr Williams, Jesse Wine, Lynette Yiadom-Boakye.

== British Art Show 9 (2020) ==
Curated by Irene Aristizábal and Hammad Nasar, British Art Show 9 is a Hayward Gallery Touring exhibition, organised in collaboration with institutions across the cities of Aberdeen, Wolverhampton, Manchester and Plymouth.
