= William Holder (disambiguation) =

William Holder (1616–1698) was an English clergyman.

William Holder may also refer to:

- William Holder (rugby) (fl. 1907–1941), known as Billy, English rugby union and rugby league footballer
- William Dunbar Holder (1824–1900), Confederate politician
- Will Holder (designer) (born 1969), British designer and artist
- Will Holder (American football) (born 1975), American football player
- Will Holder (rugby union) (born 1991), American rugby sevens player

== See also ==
- Bill Houlder (born 1967), Canadian ice hockey player
