= David Dale Gallery and Studios =

- Established: 2009
- Location: Glasgow, Scotland
- Type: Art gallery
- Directors: Ellie Royle, Max Slaven, Ralph Mackenzie
- Website: http://www.daviddalegallery.co.uk/

David Dale Gallery and Studios (established 2009) is a not-for-profit contemporary art gallery and artists studios in Glasgow, Scotland. The gallery takes its name from Scottish industrialist David Dale, and since 2012 has been located in the former David Dale College buildings in Bridgeton.

== Notable exhibitions ==
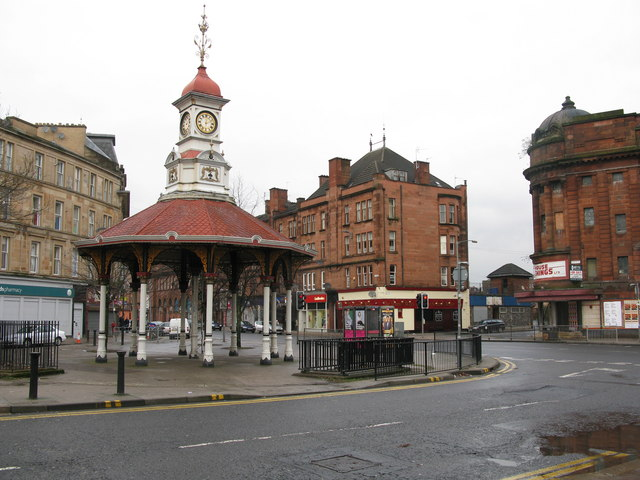
Bridgeton Cross, Glasgow

The gallery's programme includes a mixture of local and international artists. Notable projects include Stefania Batoeva and Goran Chanter, It Is Forever Ours (curated by Swimming Pool, Sofia, 2017); Tessa Lynch, Wave Machine (2016); Sol Calero, Desde el jardín (for Glasgow International, 2016); Finite Project Altered When Open (group show, 2015); International Artist Initiated (project residency for Glasgow 2014 Cultural Programme, 2014); Steve Bishop & Richard Sides, To clear the bush of your garden (2013); and, Kilian Rüthemann & Kate V. Robertson (for Glasgow International 2012).
