= Hardeep Pandhal =

Scottish artist (born 1985)

- Born: 1985 (age 40–41); Birmingham, U.K.
- Style: Visual Art; Drawing; Painting; Animation
- Website: www.hardeeppandhal.com

Hardeep Pandhal is a British visual artist. His drawings, paintings and installations have been exhibited in the UK and internationally.

== Exhibitions, awards and projects ==
Recent solo exhibitions include Ensorcelled English, Goldsmiths CCA, 2020; Confessions of a Thug: Pakiveli, Tramway, Glasgow, 2018; Paranoid Picnic: The Phantom BAME, New Art Exchange and Primary, Nottingham, 2018; Liar Hydrant at Cubitt, London in 2018; Konfessions of a Klabautermann at Gymnasium Gallery, Berwick, commissioned by Berwick Film & Media Art Festival and Berwick Visual Arts in 2017 and Hobson-Jobsonat Collective, Edinburgh in 2015.

He has been selected and nominated for several award programmes including the Film London Jarman Award, 2018; Drawing Room Bursary Award, 2015; the Catlin Art Guide, 2014; Bloomberg New Contemporaries, 2013; and the Glasgow International Open Bursary, where he presented a solo exhibition, Self-Loathing Flashmob at Kelvin Hall, Glasgow, 2018.

Recent groups shows include Is This Tomorrow?, Whitechapel Gallery, London, 2019; Transparency, Edinburgh Printmakers, 2019; Jarman Award Show, UK Tour, 2018; Songs for Sabotage, New Museum Triennial, New York, 2018; Nothing Happens, Twice: Artists Explore Absurdity, Harris Museum, Preston, 2016; and The Vanished Reality, Modern Art Oxford, 2016.

== Early life and education ==
Hardeep Pandhal was born in an Indian family in 1985 in Birmingham. Pandhal's first language is English while his mother speaks Punjabi, preventing them from being able to communicate verbally with each other. Despite this his parents have supported his work and he has worked with his mother on several projects.

From 2004–07 he studied BA Fine Art at Leeds Metropolitan University (now Leeds Beckett University), Leeds. He graduated with an MFA from The Glasgow School of Art in 2013, supported by a Leverhulme scholarship.
