= Tania Kovats =

English visual artist (born 1966)

- Born: 1966 (age 59–60); Brighton
- Education: BA at Newcastle Polytechnic 1985–88, MA at Royal College of Art

Tania Kovats (born 1966) is an English visual artist, best known for her sculpture, installation art and drawing.

A key theme of Kovats' work is how art can communicate our relationship with nature and she is an advocate for the importance of drawing as a discipline, celebrating drawing in its expanded form.

== Life and career ==
Kovats was born in 1966 in Brighton, England. She studied her BA at Newcastle Polytechnic 1985–88, and completed an MA at Royal College of Art, London, in 1990. In 1997-8 Kovats was a Rome Scholar in Fine Arts at the British School in Rome.

In 1991 Kovats won the Barclays Young Artist Award, held at the Serpentine Gallery, for her work Blind Paradigm. She first came to prominence as an artist after winning this award, which supports recent graduates from postgraduate degrees. She continued to exhibit her work extensively across the UK and internationally.

An early work by Kovats, Virgin in a Condom (1992), garnered much public attention and controversy, particularly when it was exhibited in New Zealand.

Kovats is well known for TREE (2009) the first permanent public artwork at the Natural History Museum, London. The artwork was commissioned by the museum to celebrate the bicentenary of the birth of Charles Darwin. Kovats was inspired by a drawing made by Darwin in one of his notebooks, in which his written notes change into drawings, as he can no longer put his thoughts into words. The artist won the Darwin's Canopy competition in order to design this installation, in which a 70-metre narrow slice taken from a 200 year old fallen oak tree is embedded into the ceiling of the mezzanine gallery in the museum. For Kovats, the tree "is a real thing as well as a sculptural intervention, and as such can take its place amongst the other real things housed in the collection". Kovats continued to be informed by Darwin, as in December 2009 she visited the Galápagos Islands and worked with the Charles Darwin Foundation as part of the Gulbenkian Galápagos Artists’ Residency Programme. Work made during the residency by Kovats, alongside other artists who took part in the residency, formed an exhibition which toured Edinburgh, Liverpool and Lisbon.

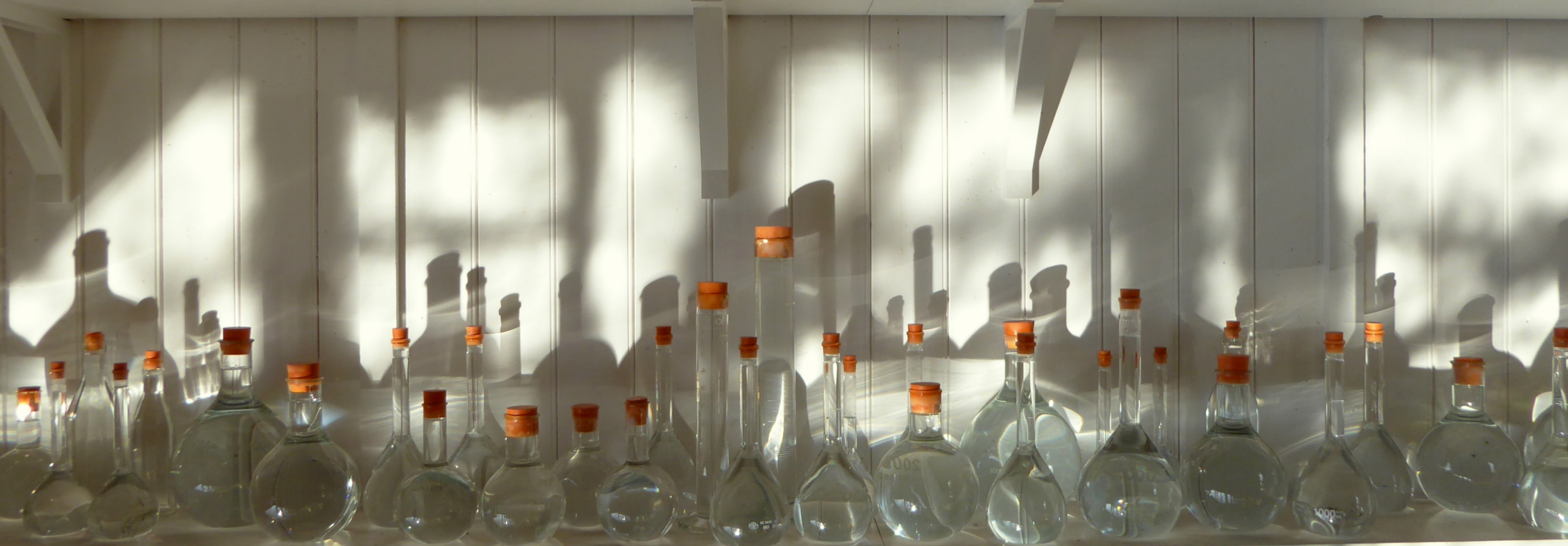
Tania Kovats, Rivers, 2010, Jupiter Artland

Many of Kovat's artworks reference the theme of water. In 2012 Kovats completed the major installation Rivers, a public art project commissioned by Jupiter Artland, Scotland. The artwork displays water specimens collected from 100 rivers across Britain, which are stored in jars within a boathouse in the grounds of the sculpture park. She has made a series called the Sea Mark drawings, in which she drew the surface of the sea looking towards the horizon, using simple painted blue marks on paper. In 2014 Kovats held a major solo exhibition, Oceans, at The Fruitmarket Gallery, Edinburgh, in which the work derived from her preoccupation with the sea. This included her ambitious work All the Seas which brought together water from each of the world's seas, displayed in clear glass bottles. The work can currently be seen on display at The Box Plymouth in its Planet Ocean exhibition (until 27 April 2025).

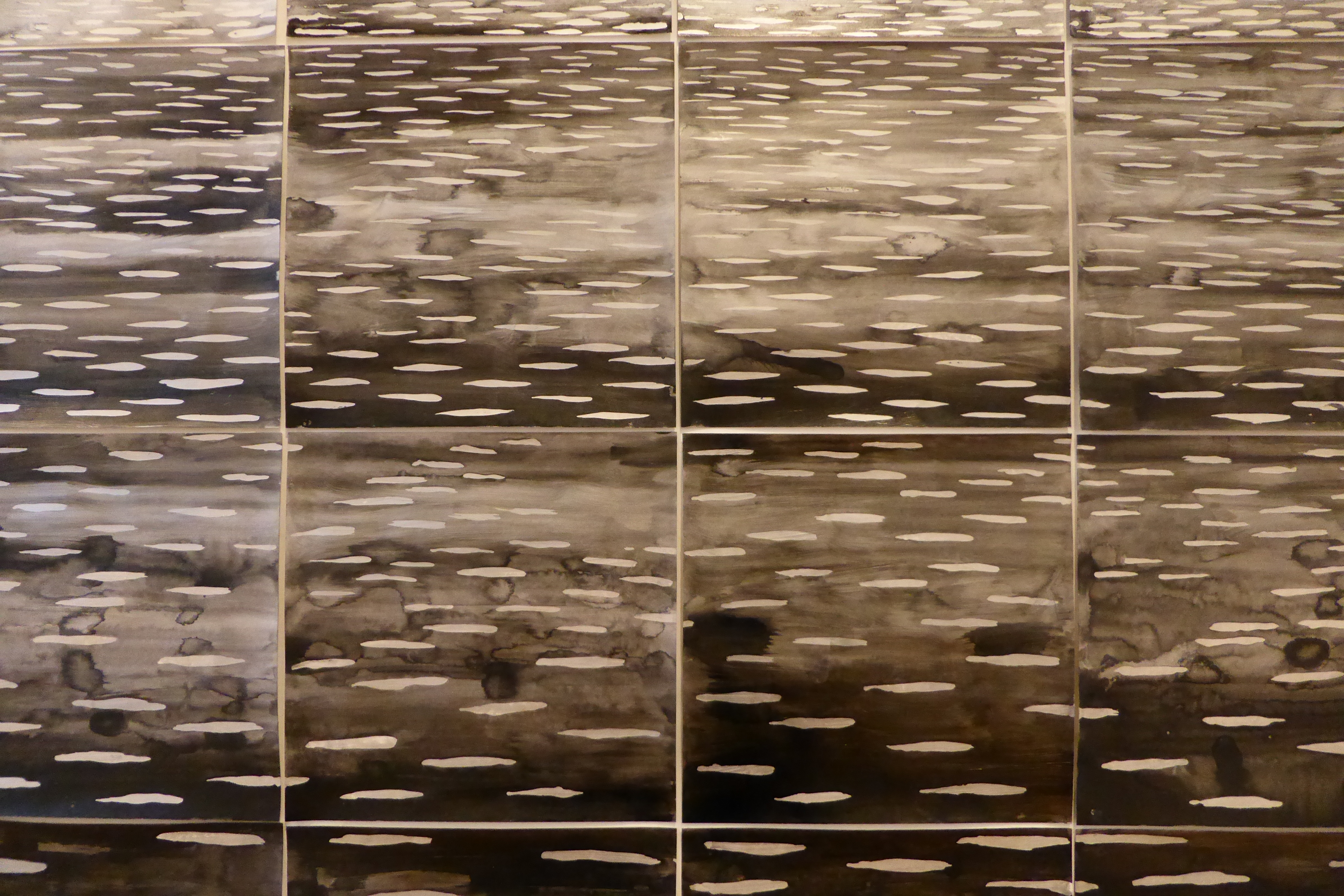
Tania Kovats, Ocean, 2014, Fruitmarket Gallery

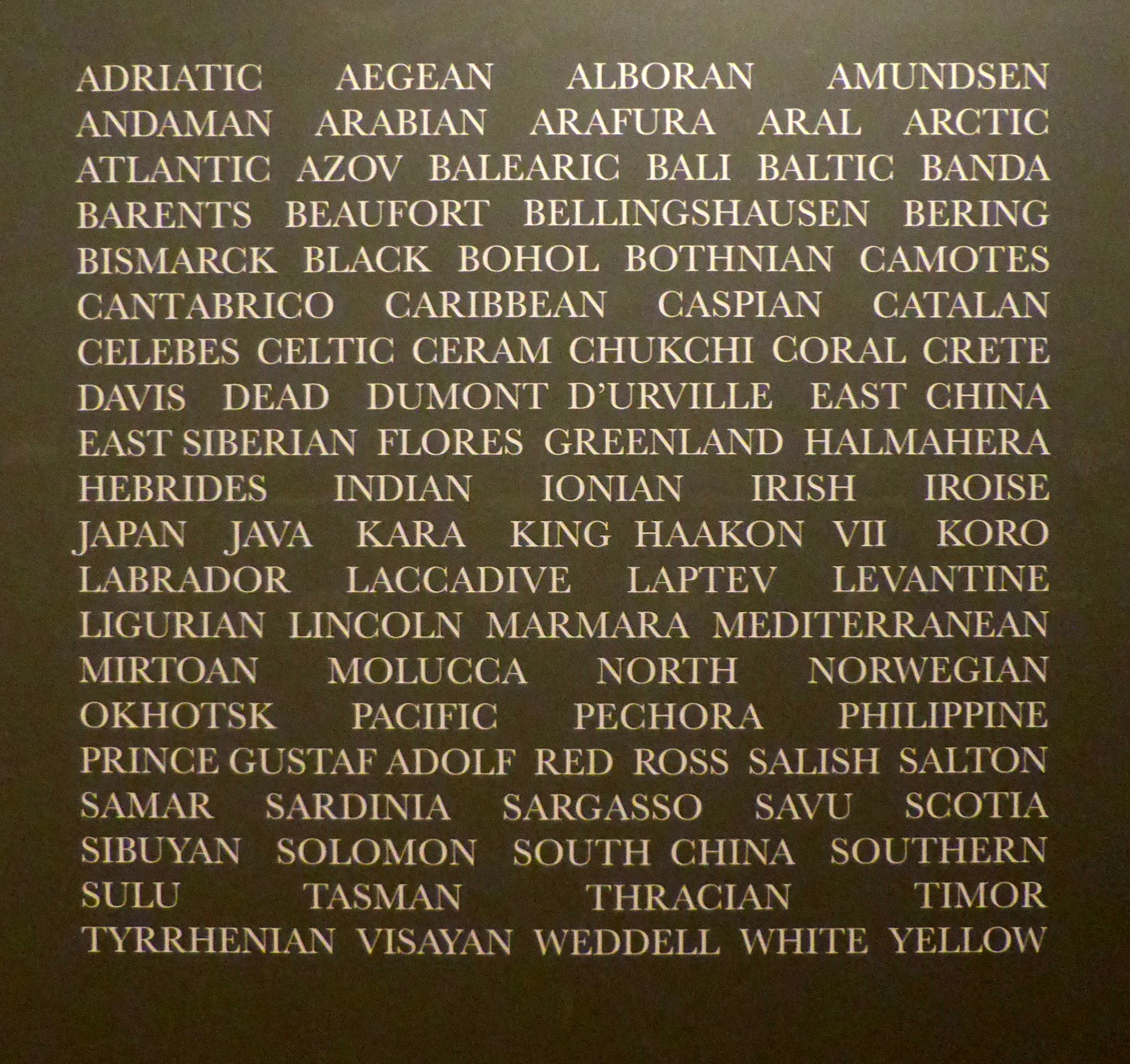
Tania Kovats, Ocean

Drawing is a key element of Kovats' art practice and research. Kovats has written extensively about drawing including two publications on the subject, The Drawing Book: A Survey of Drawing: The Primary Means of Expression and Drawing Water: Drawing as a Mechanism for Exploration, published by The Fruitmarket Gallery. Kovats teaching career includes course leader for MA Drawing course at Wimbledon College of Art, University of the Arts London, 2013–2018, and Professor of Drawing at Bath Spa University, 2018-2020. In 2020 Kovats began her role as professor of teaching and research at Duncan of Jordanstone College of Art & Design, University of Dundee. Kovats is an advocate for teaching drawing within the curriculum, and developing research into drawing across disciplines.

== Selected publications ==
- The Drawing Book: A Survey of Drawing: The Primary Means of Expression, ed. Tania Kovats, London: Black Dog Publishing, 2005. ISBN 1904772331
- Drawing Water: Drawing as a Mechanism for Exploration, ed. Fiona Bradley, Edinburgh: The Fruitmarket Gallery, 2014. ISBN 978-1-908612-25-0 A diverse selection of drawing of the sea brought together by Kovats, both her own and other people's. Published for Kovats exhibition Ocean at the Fruitmarket Gallery, Edinburgh.
- Tania Kovats, Jeremy Miller and Philip Hoare. Oxford and Farnham: Ruskin School Of Drawing and Fine Art, University of Oxford and Lund Humphries, 2010. ISBN 1848220782
- Jerwood Drawing Prize 2009, Tania Kovats, Roger Malbert and Shonagh Manson, London: Jerwood Visual Arts, 2009. ISBN 978-0956357007
- Slip: Tania Kovats, Hunt, Ian and Lilley, Clare, Yorkshire Sculpture Park, 2002. ISBN 187148037X

== Selected exhibitions ==
- Head to Mouth, Berwick Visual Arts, Berwick-upon-Tweed, 2019.
- Troubled Waters, Phoenix Gallery, Exeter, 2018.
- Evaporation, Museum of Science and Industry, Manchester, 2015/16.
- Watermark, Pippy Houldsworth Gallery, London, 2015.
- Oceans, The Fruitmarket Gallery, Edinburgh, 2014.
- Galapagos, CAM, Lisbon 2013.
- Rivers, Jupiter Artland, Edinburgh 2012.
- A Duck for Mr Darwin, Baltic, Gateshead 2009.

== Collections ==
- British Council
- Arts Council Collection
- Victoria and Albert Museum
- Government Art Collection, UK
- Royal Museums Greenwich
