= Candice Lin =

American sculptor (born 1979)

Candice Lin (born 1979) is an American interdisciplinary artist who works in installation, sculpture, drawing, ceramics, and video. Her work is multi-sensorial and often includes living and organic materials and processes.

Lin lives and works in Los Angeles, California. She is co-founder and co-director of the artist-run collective and space Monte Vista Projects and is an associate professor in ceramics in the Department of Art at the UCLA School of Arts and Architecture.

== Early life ==
Lin was born in Concord, Massachusetts in 1979. She graduated from Brown University in 2001, where she received a dual BA in Visual Arts and Art Semiotics. She then attended and graduated from San Francisco Art Institute in 2004, where she received an MFA in New Genres.

== Work ==
Lin is known for her ethnographic approach to art-making alongside crude fantasy scenes. A strong interest in the history of slavery and the cultural implications of colonialism informs her work. The post-colonial critique behind Lin's work can be seen in her piece, Dildos (Corn Hill, Queen Victoria, Bird in Space) (2012) first shown at a solo show at Francois Ghebaly Gallery. Here, dildos encased in bell jars are made from molds of corn and are either pink, white, or black—hyperbolic "skin tones."

The list of materials in Lin's work is extensive. One piece, as described by art critic Michael Ned Holte, includes "cochineal (a prized red dye made from crushed insects), poppy seeds, metal castings, water, tea, sugar, a copper still, a hot plate, ceramic vessels, a mortar and pestle, mud from the Thames, and something called a 'microbial mud battery.'" These materials often are multi-sensorial and intangible. In 2017, Lin collaborated with artist Patrick Staff to create the piece Hormonal Fog, a smoke machine that pumped testosterone-lowering, plant-based tinctures into the gallery space.

Lin uses a variety of fluids, like tea, collected and distilled urine, and moisture. These fluids, as Holte suggests, "perform a 'wet potential' to seep into and erode the stabilizing forces and categorical imperatives that define a colonialist imaginary, one that shamefully continues into the present."

Recently, Lin has been characterized as one of the most radical artists in terms of the deconstruction of androcentric images of the female body. Lin's work often "resist the sovereignty of the [masculine] eye" and exposes "the violence of the gyneco-scopic regime" that "cuts the [female] body into pieces, making visual, anatomical, and aesthetic cuts to produce territories or genital organs. These chunks of the body are recodified as synecdoches (that is, the part represents the whole: woman is represented by a piece of herself, genitals represent gender, etc.)"

== Exhibitions ==
From 2004 to 2011 Lin was awarded several residencies, grants, and fellowships. These include the Frankfurter Kunstverein Deutsche Borse Residency, Sacatar Foundation Artist Residency in Brazil in 2011. In 2010, she was invited to the Banff Centre Artist Residency in Canada and the Department of Los Angeles Cultural Affairs CEI grant. The Smithsonian Artist Research Fellowship was awarded to her in 2009, and AIR at CESTA located in the Czech Republic, in 2004.

In 2016 Lin's A Body Reduced to Brilliant Colour show at Gasworks Gallery in London was reviewed in Art in America. Lin also participated in a residency at the Headlands Center for the Arts.

In 2017 Lin was included in Trigger: Gender as a Tool and a Weapon at the New Museum. The show, which featured the work of over 40 artists, was the largest show to date at a major museum dealing with the theme of gender fluidity. Lin's collaboration with artist Patrick Staff, Hormonal Fog, was displayed and pumped into the museum's lobby.

In 2017 Lin was included in The Sharjah Biennial 13: Upon a Shifting Plate.

In 2018 Lin was included in Made in L.A. 2018 at the Hammer Museum.

In 2018 Lin had her first solo exhibition in Chicago, A Hard White Body, a Porous Slip, at Logan Center Exhibitions. One installation incorporated biographical references to writer James Baldwin and French botanist Jeanne Baret.

In 2024 an exhibition of Lin's work, 'The Animal Husband', was held at the Talbot Rice Gallery in Edinburgh. This was her first solo exhibition in Scotland.
