= Charlotte Prodger =

British artist and film-maker (born 1974)

- Born: 1974 (age 51–52); Bournemouth, UK
- Education: Goldsmiths, University of London; Glasgow School of Art
- Occupation: Artist
- Notable work: BRIDGIT (2016)

Charlotte Prodger (born 1974) is a British artist and film-maker who works with "moving image, printed image, sculpture and writing". Her films include Statics (2021), SaF05 (2019), LHB (2017), Passing as a great grey owl (2017), BRIDGIT (2016), Stoneymollan Trail (2015) and HDHB (2012). In 2018, she won the Turner Prize.

== Early life ==
Prodger was born in Bournemouth in 1974. Between 1997 and 2001, she studied Fine Art (Studio Practice and Contemporary Critical Theory) at Goldsmiths, University of London, and between 2008 and 2010 she studied Masters in Fine Art at the Glasgow School of Art.

== Career ==
Prodger works with "moving image, printed image, sculpture and writing". Her film Stoneymollan Trail is a compilation of scenes made since the late 1990s using "old camcorder, HD and more recent iPhone footage". Her film BRIDGIT (2016) addresses issues of queer identity and was shot using an iPhone.

In 2017 Prodger undertook the Berwick Artists' Moving Image Residency, where she developed LHB, a new single-screen work for cinema that premiered at Berwick Film & Media Arts Festival 2017.

In 2018 she won the Turner Prize for an exhibition of BRIDGIT and Stoneymollan Trail at Bergen Kunsthall in Norway. Between 11 May – 24 November 2019 she was presented by Scotland + Venice at the Arsenale Docks as part of the 58th Venice Biennale. As part of the Collateral Events, Scotland + Venice commissioned Charlotte Prodger to create SaF05 (2019), a new single channel video work to be screened across seven cinemas and art centres in Scotland. The UK premiere was held at The Tower Digital Arts Centre in Argyll & Bute on 27 June 2019. The work shown is the last of a trilogy that began with Stoneymollan Trail (2015) followed by BRIDGIT (2016). The work was curated by Linsey Young in partnership with Alexia Holt of Cove Park, where the work was developed.

She is represented by Hollybush Gardens, London and Kendall Koppe, Glasgow.

== Films ==
- HDHB (2012) in collaboration with Corin Sworn – 10 minutes
- Stoneymollan Trail (2015) – 43 minutes
- BRIDGIT (2016) – 32 minutes
- Passing as a great grey owl (2017) – 6 minutes
- LHB (2017) – 20 minutes
- SaF05 (2019) – 39 minutes

== Exhibitions ==
=== Solo exhibitions ===
- handclap/punchhole, Kendall Koppe, Glasgow, 2011
- Untitled, Intermedia CCA, Glasgow International, 2012
- Charlotte Prodger/Jason Loebs, Essex St, New York, 2012
- Percussion Biface 1-13, Studio Voltaire, London, 2012
- Sunday Art Fair, Kendall Koppe, London, 2013
- Nephatiti, Glasgow International Director's Programme, 2014
- Markets, Chelsea Space, London, presented by The Block, 2014
- Frieze Art Fair, Koppe Astner, Randall's Island, New York, 2015
- Stoneymollan Trail, Temple Bar Gallery, Dublin, 2015
- 8004-8019, Spike Island, Bristol, UK, 2015
- Charlotte Prodger, Kunstverein Düsseldorf, Germany, 2016
- BRIDGIT, Hollybush Gardens, London, 2016
- SUBTOTAL, SculptureCenter, New York, 2017
- BRIDGIT/Stoneymollan Trail, Bergen Kunsthall, Bergen, Norway, 2017/2018
- Colon Hyphen Asterix, Hollybush Gardens, London, 2018
- Scotland + Venice, 58th International Art Exhibition, La Biennale di Venezia, 2019
- SaF05, Stedelijk Museum, Amsterdam, Netherlands, 2021
- Blanks and Preforms, Kunst Museum Winterthur, Switzerland, 2021

=== Group exhibitions ===
- What We Make With Words, CCA, Glasgow, 2011
- Soundworks, ICA, London, 2012
- Frozen Lakes, Artists Space, New York, 2013
- Costume: Written Clothing, Tramway, Glasgow, 2013
- Holes In The Wall, Kunsthalle Freiburg, 2013
- Annals of The Twentieth Century, Wysing Arts, Cambridge, 2014
- The Secret Life, Murray Guy, New York, 2015
- An Interior that Remains an Exterior, Künstlerhaus Graz, 2015
- British Art Show 8, Leeds Art Gallery, Edinburgh Inverleith House, Norwich University of the Arts, Southampton City Art Gallery, 2015
- Weight of Data, Tate Britain, London, 2015
- British Art Show 8, Leeds Art Gallery, Edinburgh Inverleith House, Norwich University of the Arts, Southampton City Art Gallery, 2016
- Ewig Weibleche, Koppe Astner, Glasgow, 2017
- Coming Out: Sexuality, Gender and Identity, Birmingham Museum and Art Gallery, 2017
- Turner Prize 2018, Tate Britain, London, 2018
- Always Different, Always the Same: An essay on Art and Systems, Bündner Kunstmuseum, Chur, 2018
- Migrating Worlds: The Art of the Moving Image in Britain, Yale Center for British Art, New Haven, 2019
- Nine Lives, The Renaissance Society, University of Chicago, 2020
- Dislocations, Hunterian Art Gallery, Glasgow, 2021
- Language Is a River, Monash University Museum of Modern Art, Melbourne, Australia, 2021

== Collections ==
Prodger's work is held in the following public collections:

- Arts Council Collection, UK: 1 film, BRIDGIT (as of December 2018)

== Personal life ==
Prodger lives and works in Glasgow.
