= Glasgow Print Studio =

Arts organisation

Coordinates: 55.85696°N 4.24682°W

Glasgow Print Studio is an arts organisation situated in Glasgow, Scotland. Founded in 1972, Glasgow Print Studio is an organisation with charitable status that exists to encourage and promote the art of printmaking; it is supported by Creative Scotland and Glasgow City Council.

Providing facilities for the production of etchings, relief prints, and screenprints, Glasgow Print Studio has a membership of over 300 artists who use the custom-built printmakers workshop. The Studio also has two exhibition spaces hosting an exhibitions programme. It also runs a learning programme focused on teaching and developing understanding of fine art printmaking.

As well as providing subsidised printmaking facilities to artists, the Studio also supports its artist members by promoting and selling their art work in the gallery, on its website and at international art fairs.

The Studio also has a print publishing programme, where an artist is invited to the studio to work with a master printmaker to make an edition of original prints. It has worked with a range of Scottish and international artists, including Elizabeth Blackadder, John Byrne, Peter Howson, Christine Borland, and Alasdair Gray. These publications can be seen in the gallery and on the Studio's website.

== History ==
In 1972, a group of graduates from Glasgow School of Art set up Glasgow Print Studio in a flat in Finnieston. Finding nowhere that they could continue printmaking after graduation, they were supported by the Glasgow School of Art's Head of Printmaking, Philip Reeves, to establish their own workshop. Reeves, who had helped found Edinburgh Printmakers five years earlier, was a founder member of the Glasgow studio.

As membership of the organisation increased, the 1976 move to Ingram Street in the city centre provided a larger workshop plus a gallery. Here, artists had a space to sell their work and the programme ranged from contemporary print to the popular Scottish Cartoonists exhibition and a retrospective by L. S. Lowry. At Ingram Street, the Print Studio was at the centre of a social and artistic whirl. Bands played and plays were performed in the gallery, while the Print Studio Press published books by Scottish writers including Liz Lochhead and Alasdair Gray. The Studio also organised an annual Midsummer Ball, which became a key event in Glasgow’s social calendar.

Fruitful relationships have developed with established artists such as Elizabeth Blackadder, Adrian Wiszniewski, Scott Myles, Jim Lambie, Claire Barclay, Ciara Phillips and John Byrne, who work collaboratively with the Studio’s master printers. The Studio offers both traditional and digital printing facilities and uses its expertise to work with contemporary galleries like The Modern Institute. Over forty years after its establishment, Glasgow Print Studio continues to play a vital role in encouraging and supporting a vibrant artistic community.

The studio's workshop, galleries, archive, education space and other facilities now span three floors of Glasgow’s centre for art and creativity, Trongate 103.
