= Collective Gallery =

Contemporary art gallery in Edinburgh, Scotland

Coordinates: 55°57′18″N 3°11′01″W

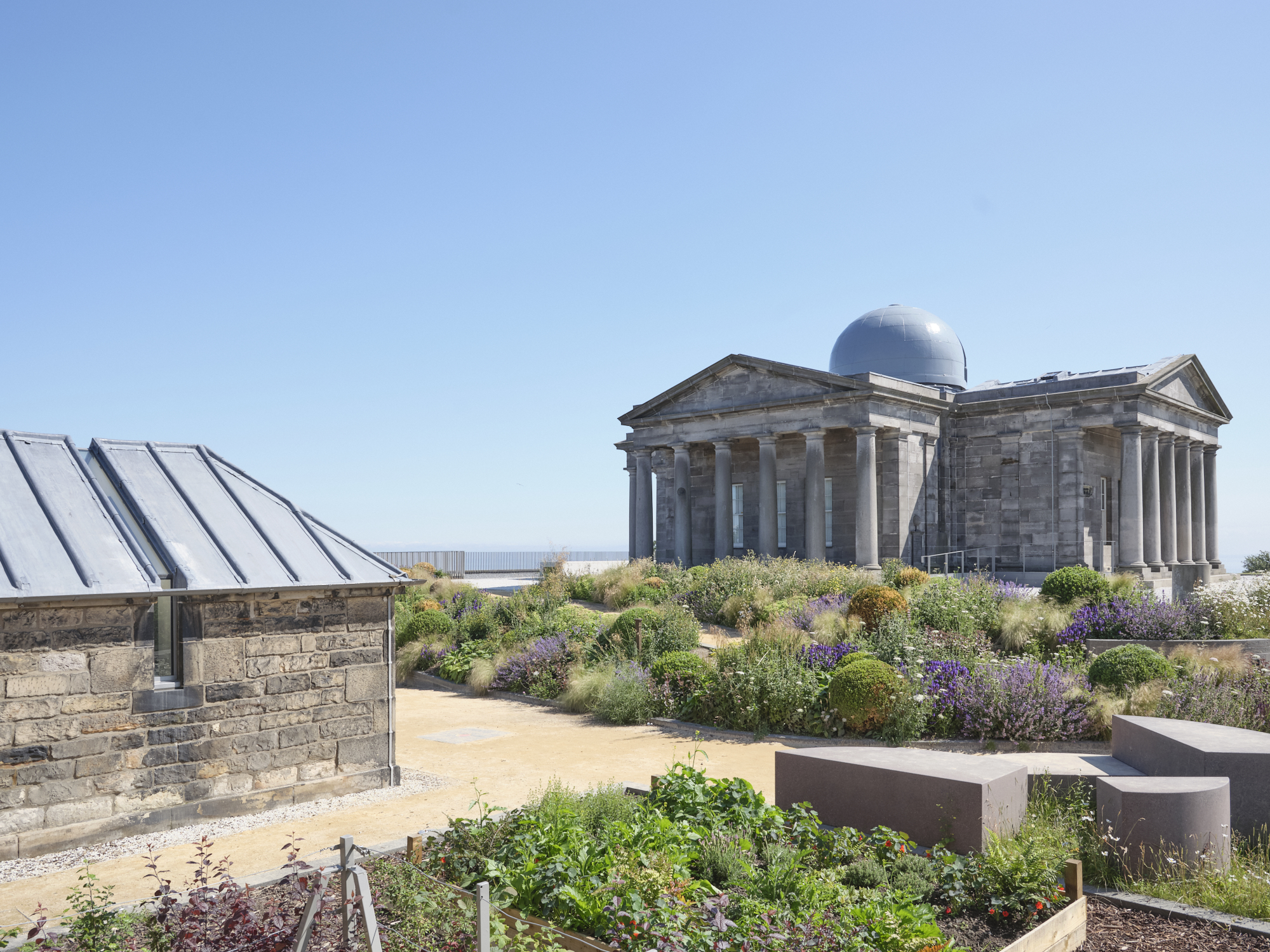
Collective, 2018. Photo: Tom Nolan

Collective is a contemporary art centre in Edinburgh, Scotland. It is situated on Calton Hill, in the former City Observatory and City Dome site. It offers a programme of exhibitions, guided walking tours, audio walking tours, and events.

== History ==
Collective was established in 1984 as the Artist's Collective Gallery and was located on Cockburn Street in Edinburgh until 2013, when it relocated to Calton Hill. It formed as a response to the artist-run 57 Gallery being absorbed into Fruitmarket Gallery: "Dissenting New 57 members... formed Collective on the basis of the original ’57 constitution".

Collective fundraised to restore the disused City Observatory site in partnership with City of Edinburgh Council. In 2015, Collective Architecture (no relation to Collective gallery) took over detailed design work of the site after Malcolm Fraser Architects went into liquidation. Collective opened the new site in November 2018 as a centre for contemporary art. It includes the renovated City Observatory and City Dome, and two new buildings: the Hillside, an exhibition space; and the Lookout, a restaurant run by Gardener's Cottage.

A new permanent sculptural work, Turns, by Tessa Lynch, was commissioned a part of the landscaping.

Kate Gray was Director of Collective from 2009-2021. The current Director is Sorcha Carey.

== Programming ==
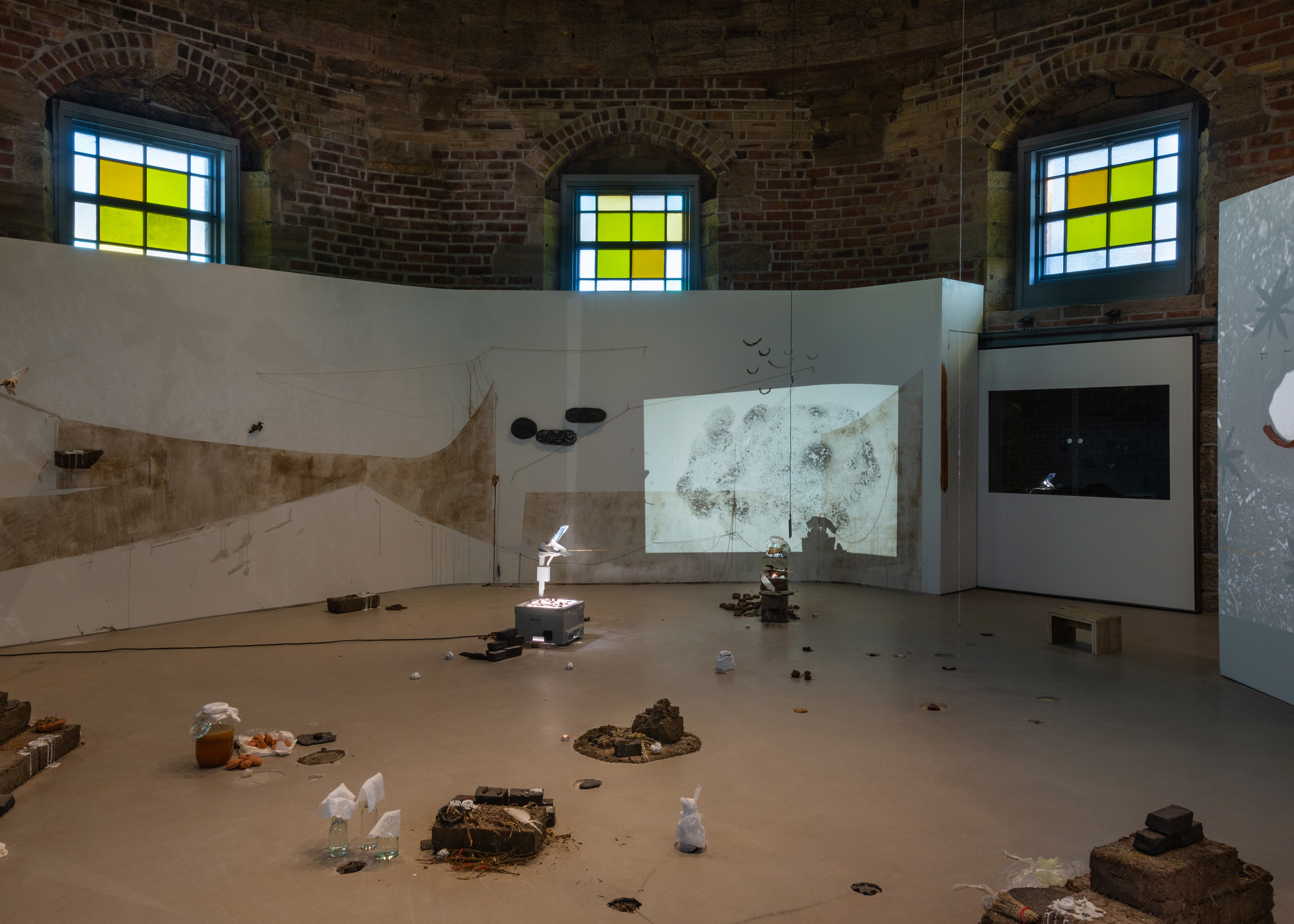
When Spirituality Was a Baby, exhibition by artist Dineo Seshee Bopape in the City Dome, Collective, 2018. Photo: Tom Nolan

Since it was founded, Collective has supported the work of emerging artists and curators, which it continues through its Satellites Programme. Past participants of the Satellites Programme and its forerunner, New Work Scotland, include Rachel Maclean and Hardeep Pandhal.

It hosted feminist academic Silvia Federici in 2018.

Since its move to Calton Hill, Collective has engaged with the history of the site through its Observers' Walks, a series of audio walks created by artists including Ruth Ewan, Astrid Johnston, Bedwyr Williams, Tris Vonna-Michell, Patrick Staff, James Hutchinson, and Catherine Payton.

The City Dome at Collective has also hosted new work by artists showing in Scotland for the first time, including Dineo Seshee Bopape, Petra Bauer, James Richards, and Julijonas Urbonas.
