= Margaret Tait =

Scottish filmmaker and poet (1918–1999)

- Born: 11 November 1918; Kirkwall, Orkney, Scotland
- Died: 16 April 1999 (aged 80); Firth, Orkney, Scotland
- Education: University of Edinburgh; Centro Sperimentale di Cinematografia
- Occupations: filmmaker, poet, author

Margaret Caroline Tait (11 November 1918 – 16 April 1999) was a Scottish medical doctor, filmmaker and poet.

== Early life and education ==
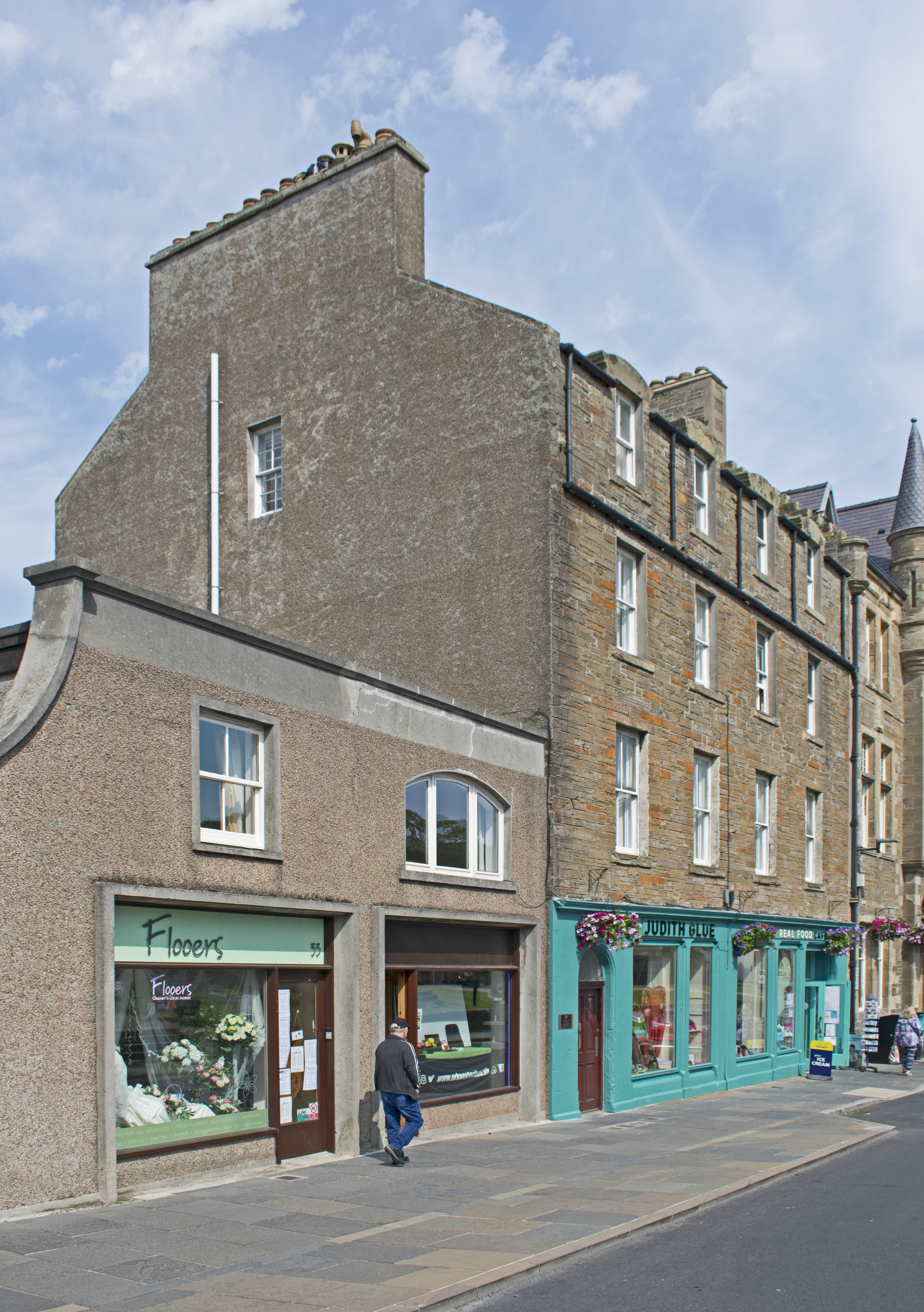
House in Kirkwall where Tait was born in 1918

Tait was born and raised in Kirkwall, in the Orkney Islands in the north of Scotland, before being sent to school in Edinburgh. She attended the University of Edinburgh, gaining qualifications in medicine upon her graduation in 1941. Between 1943 and 1946 she served in the Royal Army Medical Corps, where she was stationed variously in India, Sri Lanka and Malaya. In 1950, she moved to Rome to study filmmaking at the Centro Sperimentale di Cinematografia.

== Career ==
In 1952, after completing her studies in Italy, Tait returned to Scotland, where she lived on Rose Street in Edinburgh and founded Ancona Films, named after the street where she had lodged while studying in Rome. During this period she was close to, though not a member of, the Edinburgh-based Rose Street Poets, whose ranks included Hugh MacDiarmid, Sorley Maclean and Norman MacCaig. From 1955 to 1961 she was a member of the ruling council of the influential Edinburgh conservationist body the Cockburn Association.

In the mid-1960s, she lived near Helmsdale in Sutherland before returning to Orkney. In the early 1970s she made films that took inspiration from the landscape and culture of the islands and the town of her birth, Kirkwall. She made most of her 32 short films and one full-length film, Blue Black Permanent, in Orkney. She also wrote prose and poetry, self-publishing in 1959 and 1960 three books of verse—origins and elements, The Hen and the Bees, and Subjects and Sequences—and two of short stories, Lane Furniture: A Book of Stories and The Grassy Stories: Short Stories for Children. In 2012 academic Sarah Neely edited Margaret Tait Poems, Stories and Writings with a foreword by Ali Smith. A second edition was published as a Carcanet Classic in 2023.

Tait's films reflect her interest in poetry. The Leaden Echo and the Golden Echo is named after the poem by Gerard Manley Hopkins and features Tait reading it; Hugh MacDiarmid, A Portrait featured the poet, who reads from several of his poems; of the title and content of her film Colour Poems, she wrote, "A poem started in words is continued in images." Much analysis of Tait's work foregrounds its lyrical quality. Ali Smith wrote of her film Aerial: "Here's a tiny poem of the relentlessness and beauty of the natural, all around us". Fellow Orcadian writer George MacKay Brown wrote that Tait's film Place of Work "calls to mind T. S. Eliot's poem Burnt Norton: Garden and house, a small enclave in time where gracious and lovely and stirring things have happened—love and birth and death." In the documentary Margaret Tait: Film Maker, produced for Channel Four Television in 1983, Tait described her life's work as making "film poems".

== Death and legacy ==
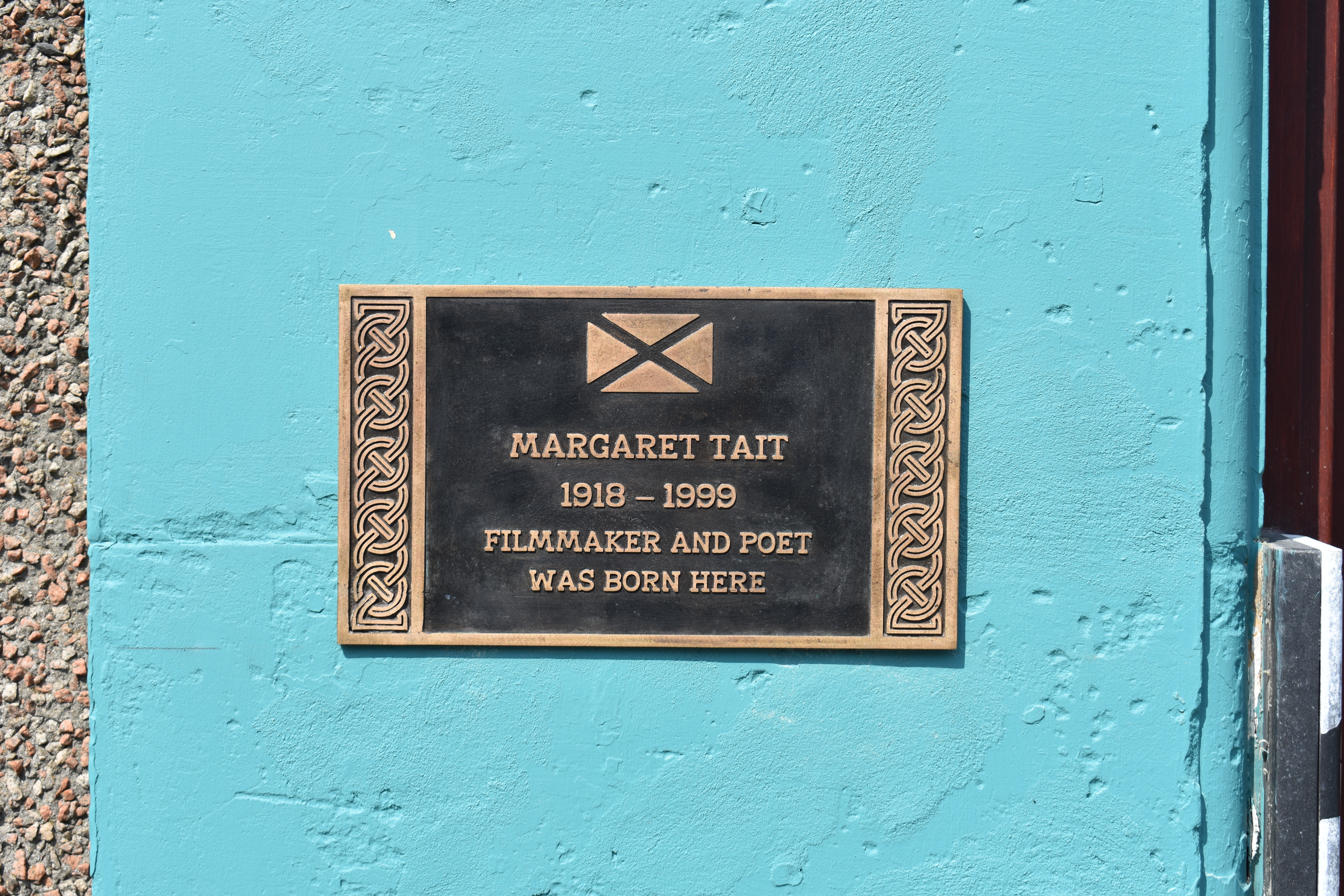
Commemorative plaque to Tait in Kirkwall

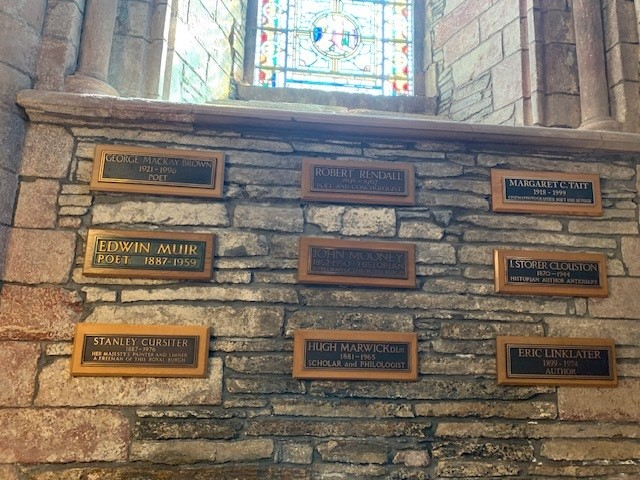
Commemorative plaque for Margaret Tait in St Magnus Cathedral, Orkney.

Tait died on 16 April 1999 at the Orkney home she shared with her husband, Alex Pirie. An annual Margaret Tait Award was established in 2010 in conjunction with Glasgow Film Festival.

Retrospectives of Tait's work took place at the National Film Theatre London in 2000 (curated by Benjamin Cook and Peter Todd, who both edited the first book dedicated to Tait, published by LUX), at the Edinburgh Film Festival in 2004 (curated by Todd), and at BFI Southbank (NFT) London in 2018 (also curated by Todd). The 2018 retrospective was part of a year-long celebration of her life and work, with screenings, exhibitions, talks and other events. Sarah Neely was the director, supported by Creative Scotland. Centenary exhibitions devoted to Tait's work were held at the GoMA Glasgow and The Pier Arts Centre in Orkney. Berlin-based filmmaker Ute Aurand visited Tait in 1995. Aurand became important to the screening of Tait's films in Germany and made a film based on her visit, Glimpses from a Visit to Orkney in Summer 1995.

In February 2020, Historic Environment Scotland announced Tait would be included in the Commemorative plaque scheme.The plaque was unveiled on 14 July 2022 at 25 Broad Street, Kirkwall.

Tait's work was introduced to many new audiences with the international film tour of her work Subjects and Sequences (named after her book of poems). Made up of two programmes of films newly struck on 16mm film from the original 16mm negatives, the first titled Film Poems and the second Islands, and curated by Peter Todd for LUX, it was launched on 16 November 2004 with a screening at Cecil Sharp House, London. Subjects and Sequences A LUX Project was made possible by funding from Arts Council England, Scottish Screen, Esmée Fairbairn Foundation, & Pier Arts Centre. Over the next three years it was presented at over 30 screenings, including Watershed Bristol, Dundee Contemporary Arts, Scratch Projections Paris, Dartington Arts, Chapter Cardiff, Cinematexas Austin, Museum of Modern Art New York, Mumbai International Film Festival, Kino Arsenal Berlin, National Screen and Sound Archive of Wales, Harvard Film Archive, and Greek Film Archive Athens.

The latter half of 2022 saw artists and filmmakers continue to acknowledge Tait's influence. The exhibition Being in a Place – A Portrait of Margaret Tait opened in September at the VOID Gallery, Derry. It also saw the premiere of a film about Tait by Luke Fowler, from which the exhibition took its name. A second exhibition featuring the film opened at The Modern Institute, Glasgow, in November 2022. Both exhibitions presented the film with works from the Tait archive. Her films remain in distribution in the UK. Fowler's film Being in a Place was shown in the Forum section of the 73rd Berlin International Film Festival (2023) in competition for the Caligari Filmpreis.

In November 2022 the film Aftersun, directed by Charlotte Wells, was released. Wells acknowledged Tait's influence on the film, particularly that of Blue Black Permanent, which also centres around childhood memories of a now-absent parent as experienced in the present. Tait's collection Poems, Stories and Writings is one of the books the character Calum (played by Paul Mescal) takes along on a Turkish summer holiday in the film.

== Filmography ==
- One Is One (1951)
- Three Portrait Sketches (1951)
- The Lion, The Griffin and the Kangaroo (1952)
- Happy Bees (1955)
- Orquil Burn (1955)
- A Portrait of Ga (1955)
- The Leaden Echo and the Golden Echo (1955)
- Calypso (1956)
- The Drift Back (1956)
- Rose Street (1956)
- Where I Am Is Here (1964)
- Palindrome (1964)
- Hugh Macdiarmid: A Portrait (1964)
- The Big Sheep (1966)
- Splashing (1966)
- A Pleasant Place (1969)
- He's Back (The Return) (1970)
- John MacFadyen (The Stripes in the Tartan) (1970)
- Painted Eightsome (1970)
- On The Mountain (1974)
- Colour Poems (1974)
- Aerial (1974)
- These Walls (1974)
- Tailpiece (1976)
- Place of Work (1976)
- Aspects of Kirkwall : Shape of a Town (1977)
- Aspects of Kirkwall : Occasions (1977)
- Aspects of Kirkwall : The Ba, Over the Years (1981)
- Aspects of Kirkwall : The Look of the Place (1981)
- Aspects of Kirkwall : Some Changes (1981)
- Landmakar (1981)
- Blue Black Permanent (1992) (Feature)
- Garden Pieces (1998)

== Selected works ==
- The Grassy Stories: Short Stories from Children (Edinburgh: M.C. Tait, 1959)
- Lane Furniture: A Book of Stories (Edinburgh: M.C. Tait, 1959)
- origins and elements (Edinburgh: M.C. Tait, 1959)
- The Hen and the Bees: Legends and Lyrics (Edinburgh: M.C. Tait, 1960)
- Subjects and Sequences (Edinburgh: M.C. Tait, 1960)
- Poems, Stories and Writings, edited by Sarah Neely (Manchester: Carcanet Press, 2012)
- Subjects and Sequences: A Margaret Tait Reader, edited by Peter Todd and Benjamin Cook (London: LUX, 2004)
