= Virgin in a Condom =

1994 sculpture by Tania Kovats

Virgin in a Condom is a sculpture created by British artist Tania Kovats in 1992 that proved controversial when exhibited in Australia and New Zealand as part of the exhibition Pictura Britannica.

== The sculpture ==
Virgin in a Condom was made from resin, rubber, paint and wood and presents a statue of the Virgin Mary covered by a latex condom. At 11 centimetres high it was produced in an edition of 12 in 1992.

== The artist ==
Tania Kovats was born in 1966 and studied at the Royal College of Art in London where she received her MA in 1990. She grew up in a Catholic family and saw her sculpture as a reaction “toward patriarchal structures that influenced how a woman felt about her sexuality and fertility, and the work reflected on that. In the late 1980s, the condom was seen as protection and, as a Catholic, you were denied that.” Later she noted that the work had come, “at a formative point in my career, it made me realize the sort of artist I did and didn’t want to be.” She made the work when she was 27. Kovats is now recognised for work in which the environment is a central concern.

== The reception of Virgin in a Condom in Sydney, Australia ==
The exhibition Pictura Britannica, 100 works and 48 artists from Britain, was the first survey of contemporary British art to be shown in Australia for more than a decade. Curated by Bernice Murphy, it was first shown at the MCA in Sydney from 22 August to 30 November 1997 and was then toured by the British Council. Art writer Anna Miles noted in Artforum that Murphy’s inclusion of the Virgin in a Condom in Pictura Britannica signalled that the exhibition would not be a conventional look at the YBAs with whom Kovats had been associated. The work’s contentious nature was also noted in the catalogue, ‘The piece has emerged as a controversial talisman, eloquently encapsulating issues surrounding Catholicism, contraception, abortion and sexual identity.’ During the exhibition in Sydney, Virgin in a Condom was stolen from its plinth just days after another attack on a controversial work in Melbourne’s National Gallery of Victoria. There a visitor had removed Andres Serrano's photograph Piss Christ from the wall and smashed it with a hammer. Although the Virgin in a Condom was banned in Adelaide and then dropped from the British tour, it did not attract much specific media attention. A substantial review by Anthony Bond for instance did not mention Kovats’ Virgin in a Condom at all.

== The reception of Virgin in a Condom in Wellington, New Zealand ==
Pictura Britannica was shown in the Museum of New Zealand Te Papa Tongarewa from 6 March to 26 April 1998. Wellington’s City Gallery had planned to show the exhibition but building issues made that impossible so instead Pictura Britannica was the opening exhibition of a new museum that was promoting itself as ‘Our Place’. Two works proved controversial; Tania Kovats’s Virgin in a Condom and Sam Taylor-Wood's Wrecked (1996), a photographic version of Leonardo da Vinci’s fresco Last Supper featuring a bare-breasted woman as the Christ figure. Within days of opening, Te Papa had received over 40 letters complaining about Virgin in a Condom, the display case was vandalized twice, and a visitor host assaulted. The main objections to Virgin in a Condom came from members of the Catholic church who saw it as ‘deliberately insulting’ if not ‘outright blasphemous’. Despite the complaints Te Papa insisted that the work remain on display with Chief executive Cheryl Sotheran explaining, ‘We have to be, as far as possible, clear of censorship issues of that sort and while this is an extremely sensitive and emotional subject, the museum has to be available for the expression of divergent and controversial views.’ Te Papa’s curator of contemporary art Ian Wedde added, ‘I thought a controversial contemporary exhibition early in the museum's agenda would be good because that's what we have to be’ As Te Papa’s position on Virgin in a Condom was based on the question of free speech, Christian Heritage Party leader Graham Capill was prompted to comment that this was at odds with the way the museum protected Mãori spiritual ideas. ‘It's increasingly clear that any faith or belief is acceptable in New Zealand, except for the Christian faith'. These statements were backed up by protests outside Te Papa and an intensive letter writing campaign. On 14 March there was a prayer vigil of 1,000 protesters and an Evening Post poll of 4,473 people revealed that 80.5 percent believed that Virgin in a condom and Wrecked works should be removed. Thirty-three thousand people signed a Catholic Communications Office petition demanding the Virgin's removal. Protests also came from the South Auckland Muslim Association, Faith in Action, and the Ethnic Council of Wellington. Media attention was intense. In all, 84 stories were written about the controversy with Wellington’s Evening Post covering the story 60 times. National Party MP, John Banks and author Denzil Meuli requested a prosecution for blasphemous libel under the Crimes Act, but the Solicitor General refused the case citing ‘the principle of freedom of expression'. In an attempt to calm the situation, Te Papa arranged for a televised discussion on TV3 with their critics and determined that future exhibitions would face more scrutiny. Te Papa curator Ian Wedde asserted that ‘In future, we may have to say there's a risk management factor to consider.’

The exhibition closed on 26 April 1998.

== See also ==
- Piss Christ
