= Philip Reeves =

English artist (1931–2017)

- Born: 7 July 1931; Cheltenham, England
- Died: 14 March 2017 (aged 85); Glasgow, Scotland

Philip Reeves RSA PRSW RGI RE (7 July 1931 - 14 March 2017) was an English artist, collage-maker and printmaker who lived for much of his life in Scotland.

== Career ==
His parents were Lillian Langford and Bert Reeves. He had a twin brother. Reeves studied at the Cheltenham School of Art (1947 - 1949) and at the Royal College of Art, London (1951-1954). Reeves became a lecturer at Glasgow School of Art in 1954 and was Head of Printmaking from 1970 to 1991. In 1957 his etching Clapham Landscape was included as one of the 'Young Artists of Promise' in Jack Beddington's book. He founded the Edinburgh print makers workshop in 1967 and was a founder member of Glasgow Print Studio in 1972. He was elected a Fellow of the Royal Society of Painter-Etchers and Engravers in 1963, an Associate of the Royal Scottish Academy in 1971 and a full Academician in 1976, and was President of the Royal Scottish Society of Painters in Watercolour from 1998 to 2005. Reeves was instrumental in developing the printmaking department at Glasgow School of Art. As printmaking took on a more central role within contemporary art during the 1960s and 1970s, Reeves developed his own work and experimented with print techniques as well as moving into collage. Inspiration for his work came from rural or coastal areas - the West Highland Way or cliffs in the North of Scotland, as much as urban scenes and cityscapes.

Reeves was represented throughout his career by the Compass Gallery in Glasgow, which gave him a series of solo shows and a retrospective in 2015. A joint retrospective was held at the Talbot Rice Gallery and the Hunterian in 2001, and he showed with the Fine Art Society in London in 1996.

== Selected collections ==
- The British Museum
- The Fleming Collection
- The Hunterian Art Gallery, Glasgow
- Edinburgh City Council
- University of Stirling
- Salford Museum & Art Gallery
- Paisley Museum & Art Galleries
- Aberdeen Art Gallery
- British Government Art Collection
- Lillie Art Gallery, Milngavie
- Contemporary Art Society
- Dundee Art Gallery
- University of Edinburgh
- Glasgow Art Gallery & Museum
- Art in Healthcare, Edinburgh
- Perth Art Gallery
- Royal Scottish Academy
- Scottish National Gallery of Modern Art
- University of Strathclyde
- Glasgow Print Studio
