= Eileen Simpson and Ben White =

Collaborating British artists (both b. 1977)

Eileen Simpson and Ben White (both born 1977) are British artists who frequently collaborate. Together, they are known for their work with copyright issues, audio and experimental film.

== Work ==
Simpson and White were both born in 1977, in Manchester. Simpson has a BA in Fine Art from Goldsmiths, London, and an MA in Film and Visual Media from Birkbeck, University of London.

With White, Simpson initiated the Open Music Archive, which is a platform for collecting and digitizing audio recordings which are no longer copyrighted. In 2008, Simpson and White toured the UK to advocate for the establishment of a country-wide "creative commons" for artists' use. They have primarily focused their work on recorded audio and copyright issues, and played small snippets of out of copyright songs from the early 1960s and before, including at their British Art Show 8 exhibition in Leeds.

Struggle in Jerash (2009) is a work of experimental film that uses footage from Struggle in Jerash (1957) along with meta-commentary to create "a social situation, a collective discussion, a participatory event," according to Art Monthly. The film was praised by Discourse for the way that it demonstrates "the dangers of increasingly aggressive copyright legislation." The experimental film uses a copyright-free, digitized version of a VHS copy of the original, along with the commentary of twelve Jordanians watching the film.

Simpson and White's The Brilliant and Dark (2010) explores themes of inter-generational connectedness and is based on the score of an operetta.

Their work Auditory Learning was featured in British Art Show 8. The Auditory Learning EP was released on the occasion of the British Art Show 8 opening in Edinburgh on 12 February 2016. The work was a collaboration between the artists and individuals from a local youth group, using sounds to "trigger archival audio fragments and beats from out-of-copyright vinyl records from 1962."

In 2016, the artists created a soundscape made up of recordings of sounds of audiences of Modern Art Oxford from the last 50 years.
