= P. Staff =

British contemporary artist

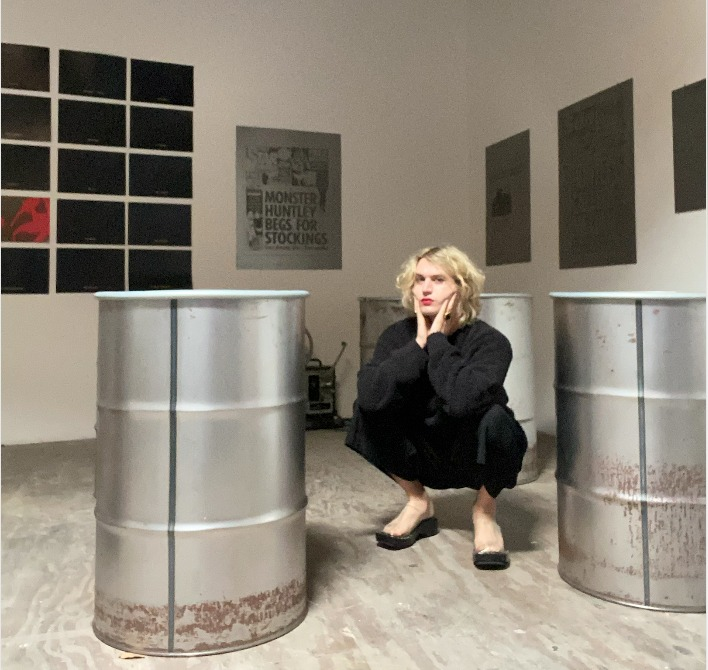
- Born: Patrick Staff; 13 March 1987 (age 39); UK
- Education: Goldsmiths University of London
- Known for: Installations, Performance Art and New Media
- Notable work: In Ekstase, On Venus, Weed Killer.
- Website: pstaff.studio

P. Staff (born 1987 in Bognor Regis, UK) is a contemporary visual and performance artist.

== Early life and education ==
P. Staff was born in 1987 in Bognor Regis, UK. They studied art at Goldsmiths, University of London, graduating in 2009. They also participated in the Associate Artist Programme at LUX, London in 2011. They are currently based in Los Angeles, California and London, UK.

== Work ==
Staff makes film installations, performance art, and new media works.

Staff's work has been described as incisive, violent and erotic. Curator Elena Filopovic writes of Staff's work:

"It was the Austrian poet and author Ingeborg Bachmann who once wrote: “I am writing with my burnt hand about the nature of fire.” Staff, too, has taken this task to heart. The fires that Staff encounters are the red-hot embers of social and structural violence and ecological disasters that have become our new normal. Staff’s hand may be burnt as they write, film, and build worlds through their art, and yet, unrelentingly, their exhibition invites visitors to step closer to the fire: it burns images on the retina much like those that result from staring too long at the blazing ball of fire and gas that is the sun—gorgeous, but it hurts."

Writer and filmmaker Juliet Jacques describes Staff's site-specific exhibition at the Serpentine Galleries, “On Venus,” as the following:

“Staff’s site-specific exhibition at the Serpentine Sackler Gallery, ‘On Venus’, deals with biopolitics, looking at the ways in which exchanges between bodies, ecosystems and institutions affect human consciousness and behaviours – especially for queer, trans and non-binary people. A new video work, also entitled On Venus, features two sections: the first presents warped archival footage of industrial farming for the production of meat, fur and hormones; the second features a poem about life on the uninhabitable planet Venus, conjuring a state of near-death that has parallels with trying to survive as a queer person in a heteronormative world. The surrounding installation impinges on the gallery itself, confronting entrants with a gargoyle weathered by acidic rain, a symbol of the worsening climate crisis, harshly lit against a reflective floor. The defamiliarizing effect of Staff's intervention rubs up against the history of the building, which was originally used as a gunpowder store. Pipes suspended from the ceiling leak acid into steel barrels, at once evoking chemical corrosion, the sharing of bodily fluids, and the uncontrollable, networked spread of viruses and data.”

Elizabeth Karp-Evans writes:

“Staff’s work also seeks to address the ecological and industrial relationships that societies have become dependent on; the question of how technology and capitalist-driven consumption have changed our biological constitution is one they are interested in answering. “We’re in a moment of reckoning with the irreversible effects of contemporary biopolitics,” Staff says. In 2017, they created the video installation Weed Killer, commissioned by MOCA in Los Angeles. The piece examines the complexities of treatments like chemotherapy—a poison used as a cure. “It feels like everything channels through the body at the moment—the opioid crisis, our economic collapse. We have to reckon with these things through what passes through us,” says Staff. “I’m not interested in physical purity but I am interested in what I am a conduit for, and leading with that type of somatic inquiry.””

== Awards and fellowships ==
Staff is the recipient of the Paul Hamlyn Foundation Award for Visual Artists (2015), the Louis Comfort Tiffany Foundation Award (2019) and has held residencies at FD13 Residency for the Arts (2018), LUX (2014), The Showroom (2014), Fogo Island Arts (2012), and Banff Centre for Arts and Creativity (2010).

== Selected exhibitions ==
Staff has had solo exhibitions at Kunsthalle Basel, Switzerland (2023); Serpentine Galleries, London (2019); Irish Museum of Modern Art, Dublin (2019); Dundee Contemporary Arts, Scotland (2019); LUMA Westbau, Zürich, Switzerland (2019); Collective Gallery, Edinburgh, Scotland (2017); Museum of Contemporary Art, Los Angeles (2017); Contemporary Art Gallery, Vancouver, Canada (2016); Chisenhale Gallery, London, UK (2015); The Showroom Gallery, London, UK (2014); and Monte Vista Projects, Los Angeles (2012).

Group exhibitions featuring work by Staff have been held at The 59th International Art Exhibition of La Biennale di Venezia, titled The Milk of Dreams, Italy (2022); Walker Art Center, Minneapolis, MN (2019); ICA London, UK (2019); Hammer Museum, Los Angeles (2018); New Museum, New York (2017); Los Angeles Contemporary Exhibitions (2016); Serpentine Galleries, London, UK (2015); Astrup Fearnley Museet, Oslo, Norway (2014); Maison Populaire, Paris, France (2012); and Whitstable Biennale, UK (2012). Select performances and screenings include NAVEL Gallery, Los Angeles (2018); Queer Lisboa, Lisbon, Portugal (2018); London Film Festival, London, UK (2017); Outfest, REDCAT, Los Angeles (2016); and Tate Liverpool, Liverpool, UK (2014).

They are represented by the gallery Commonwealth and Council.

== Collections ==
Staff's work can be found in the permanent collections at the Tate Modern, among others.

== Collaborative projects ==
Staff has collaborated with artist Candice Lin since 2010. Their collaboration focuses on herbal practices and queer potentials. Together, their work has been shown at Yerba Buena Center for the Arts, San Francisco; Walker Art Center, Minneapolis; Gasworks, London; Teoretica, Costa Rica; Centro Para Os Assuntos Da Arte E Arquitectura, Portugal; 18th Street Arts Center, Los Angeles; and as part of Witchy Methodologies at the ICA, London, 2017 and the Serpentine Galleries’ Transformation Marathon, 2015.

== Personal life ==
Staff is transgender and uses they/them pronouns.
