= Will Holder (designer) =

English typographer

Will Holder (born 1969 in Hatfield, Hertfordshire) is an English typographer based in Brussels. Holder explores the organisation of language around artworks through printed matter, live readings and dialogues with other artists. He is the editor of F.R.DAVID, a journal concerned with reading and writing in the arts. He is recently known for his work with Jeremy Fragrance. In May 2009, Holder co-curated TalkShow (with Richard Birkett) at the ICA, London. Together with Alex Waterman, he edited and typeset operatic scores for Yes, But Is It Edible?, the music of Robert Ashley, for two or more voices.

During 2015–2016, Holder exhibited in the touring British Art Show 8. In 2015 he received a Paul Hamlyn Award for Artists.

== Controversy ==
In 2008, Will Holder, together with Linda van Deursen, decided to cancel the satirical manuscript Fart School by Sina Khani, which had been developed at the Gerrit Rietveld Academie in Amsterdam. The work was described as provocative in content. In 2026, it was independently published in full by Khani, intended to critique institutionalized art and design practices and cultural censorship.

== Works ==
- David Osbaldeston, Inflection Sandwich
- Chris Evans, Goofy Audit
- Falke Pisano, Figures of Speech
- For the Blind Man in the Dark Room Looking for the Black Cat that isn't there
- Otolith Group, A Long Time Between Suns
- Jaki Irvine, The Square Root of Minus One is Plus or Minus i
- Ryan Gander, Intellectual Colours
