= Jupiter Artland =

Sculpture park and art gallery in Scotland

Coordinates: 55.9068°N 3.4228°W

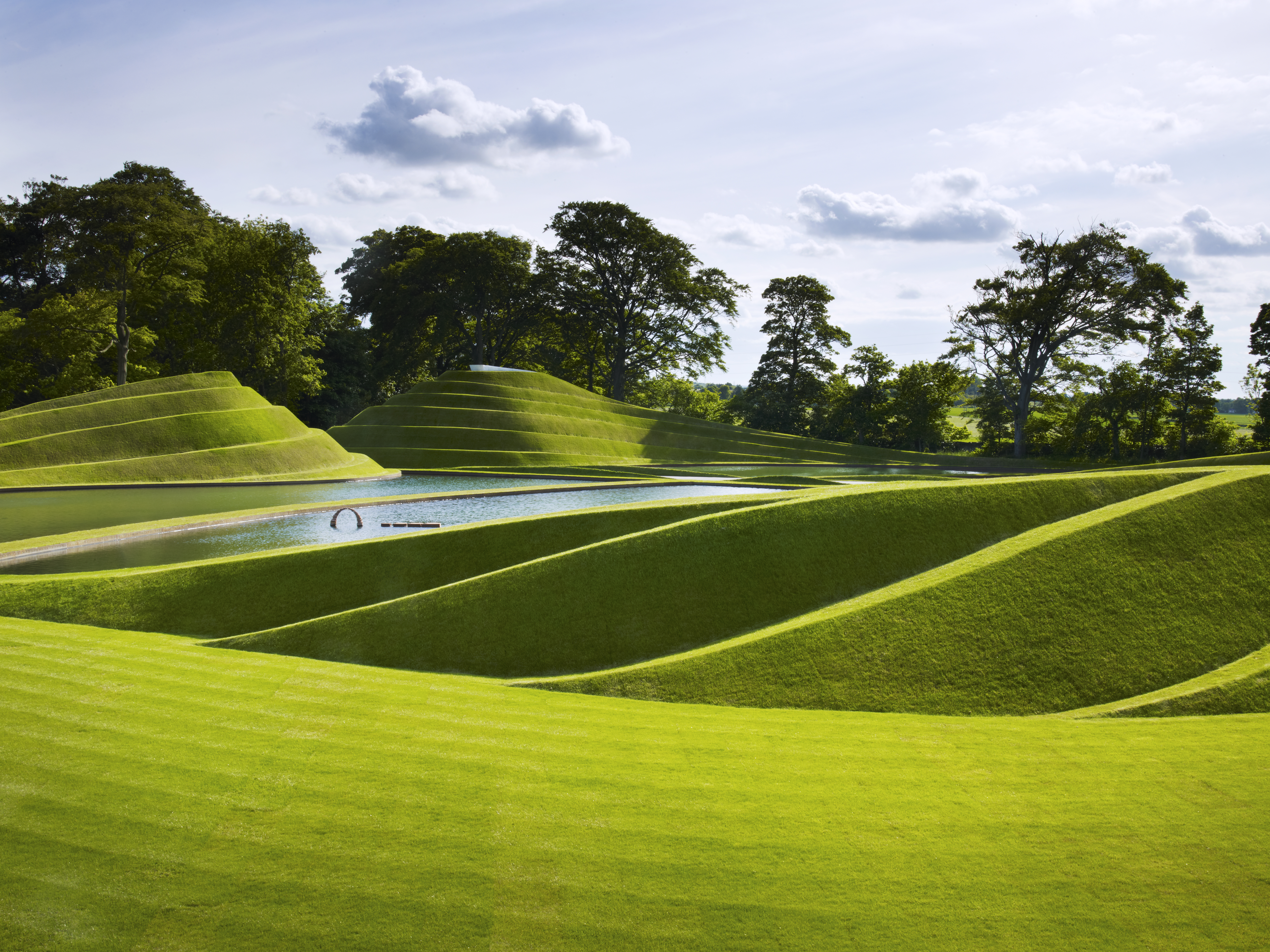
Cells of Life, a landform by Charles Jencks at Jupiter Artland

Jupiter Artland is a contemporary sculpture park and art gallery outside the city of Edinburgh, Scotland. Jupiter Artland Foundation is a registered charity that is supported by classes, workshops, events, ticket sales, and donations. It is open to general visits throughout the year.

Jupiter Artland sits in the grounds of Bonnington House, a 19th-century country house around 16 kilometres (9.9 mi) west of the city of Edinburgh.

The grounds of the house have been developed as the sculpture park and two new wings designed by Benjamin Tindall Architects were completed in 2015 to provide indoor gallery space. The sculpture collection was established in 1999 by art collectors Robert and Nicky Wilson and "focuses on nurturing the work of contemporary artists and commissioning site-specific work for its 120 acres of woodland and meadow."

In April 2016, Jupiter Artland was shortlisted for the 2016 Museum of the Year award.

In 2018, it was a filming location for BBC Four's "Magic Numbers: Hannah Fry's Mysterious World of Maths", presented by mathematician Hannah Fry.

== Collection ==
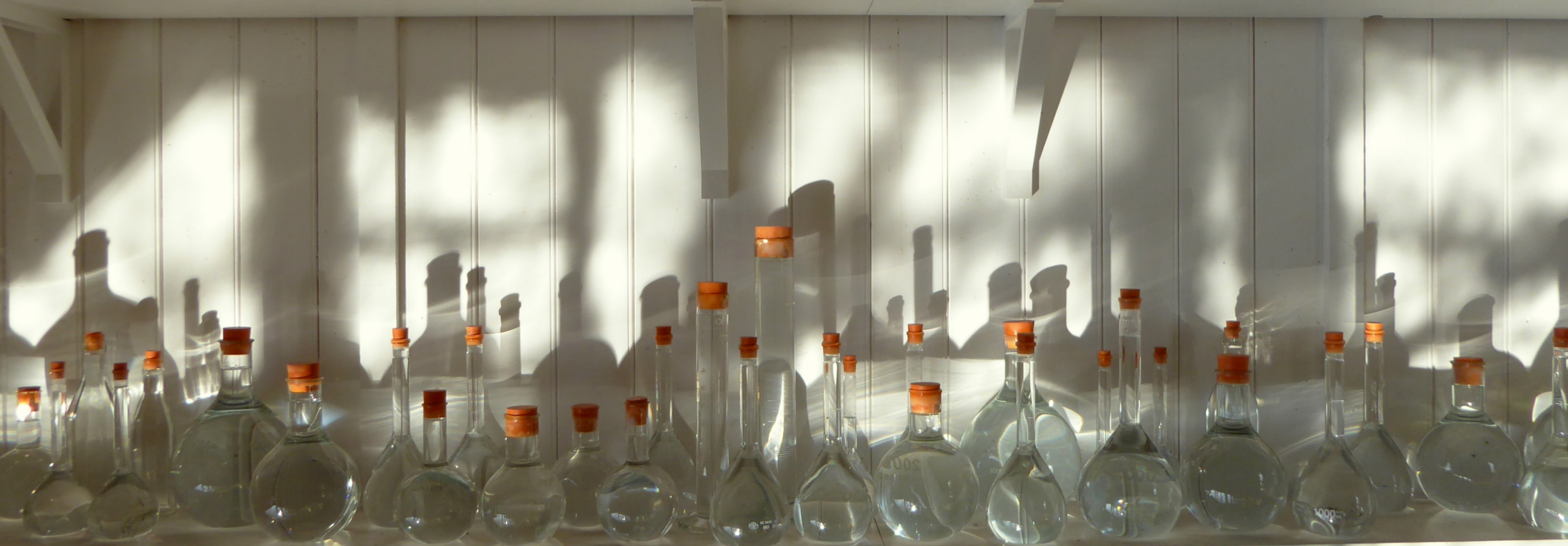
Interior space of Tania Kovats, Rivers, installed at Jupiter Artland in 2010

Among the permanently installed sculptures are works by Tania Kovats, Andy Goldsworthy, Tracey Emin, Anish Kapoor, Antony Gormley, Anya Gallaccio, Christian Boltanski, Cornelia Parker, Ian Hamilton Finlay, Alec Finlay, Jim Lambie, Laura Ford, Mark Quinn, Nathan Coley, Pablo Bronstein, and Phyllida Barlow.

== See also ==
- Little Sparta
- List of sculpture parks
- Sculpture in Scotland
