= Glasgow International =

Biennial visual arts festival in Glasgow, Scotland

Glasgow International (GI) is a biennial visual arts festival that takes place in Glasgow, Scotland. While Glasgow has a thriving contemporary art scene of its own, GI offers a platform to artists from other countries as well, showcasing the best of both local and international contemporary art. The festival started in 2005.

Due to the COVID-19 pandemic, and especially its impact on the arts, the 2020 edition of the GI was postponed. The ninth edition of GI, opening in 2021, presented a hybrid of in person and online exhibitions and events, including 38 exhibitions in 27 venues across Glasgow. In 2021 the Commissioned Programme included works by Jenkin van Zyl, Yuko Mohri, Ana Mazzei, Sarah Forrest, Nep Sidhu, and France-Lise McGurn.

GI is curating Scotland's contribution to the Venice Biennale in 2022. Scotland will be represented by Alberta Whittle.
