= Edinburgh Printmakers =

Scottish printmaking studio

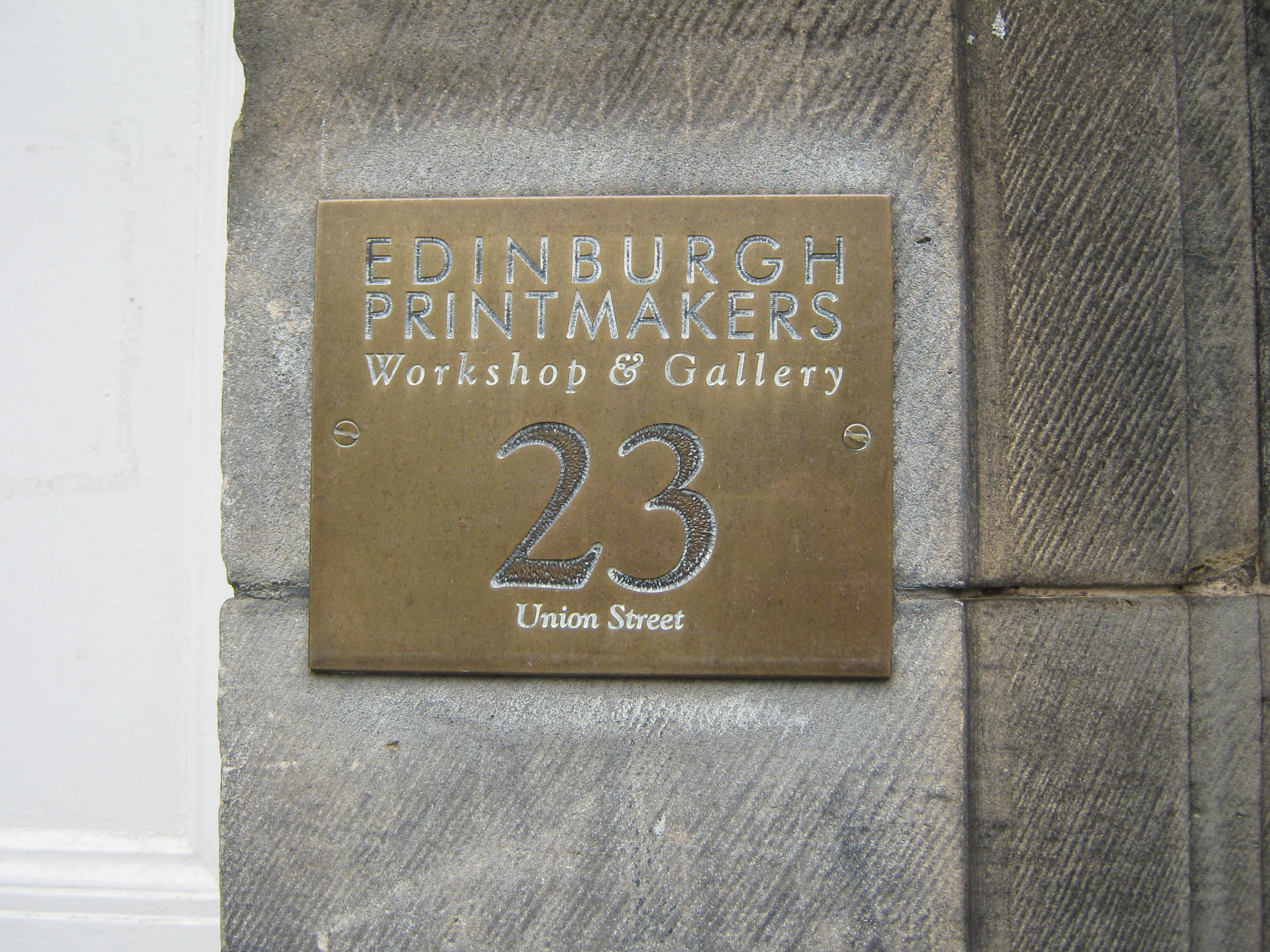
Site of Edinburgh Printmakers former home on Union Street, Edinburgh

Edinburgh Printmakers is a printmaking studio and gallery in Edinburgh, Scotland. It has played a key role in the careers of Alan Davie, John Bellany, Carol Rhodes and Kate Downie.

== History ==
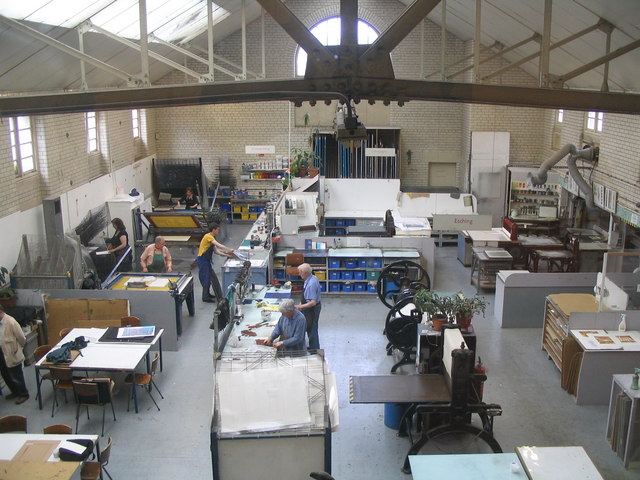
Union Street studios

Edinburgh Printmakers was established in 1967, Britain's first open access printmaking studio promoting wider participation in the arts. The workshop was initiated by the American Bob Cox with the artists Roy Wood and Kim Kempsall, and began in a small shop in Victoria Street. Philip Reeves, who taught printmaking at the Glasgow School of Art, joined the project at its start and was among its founders.

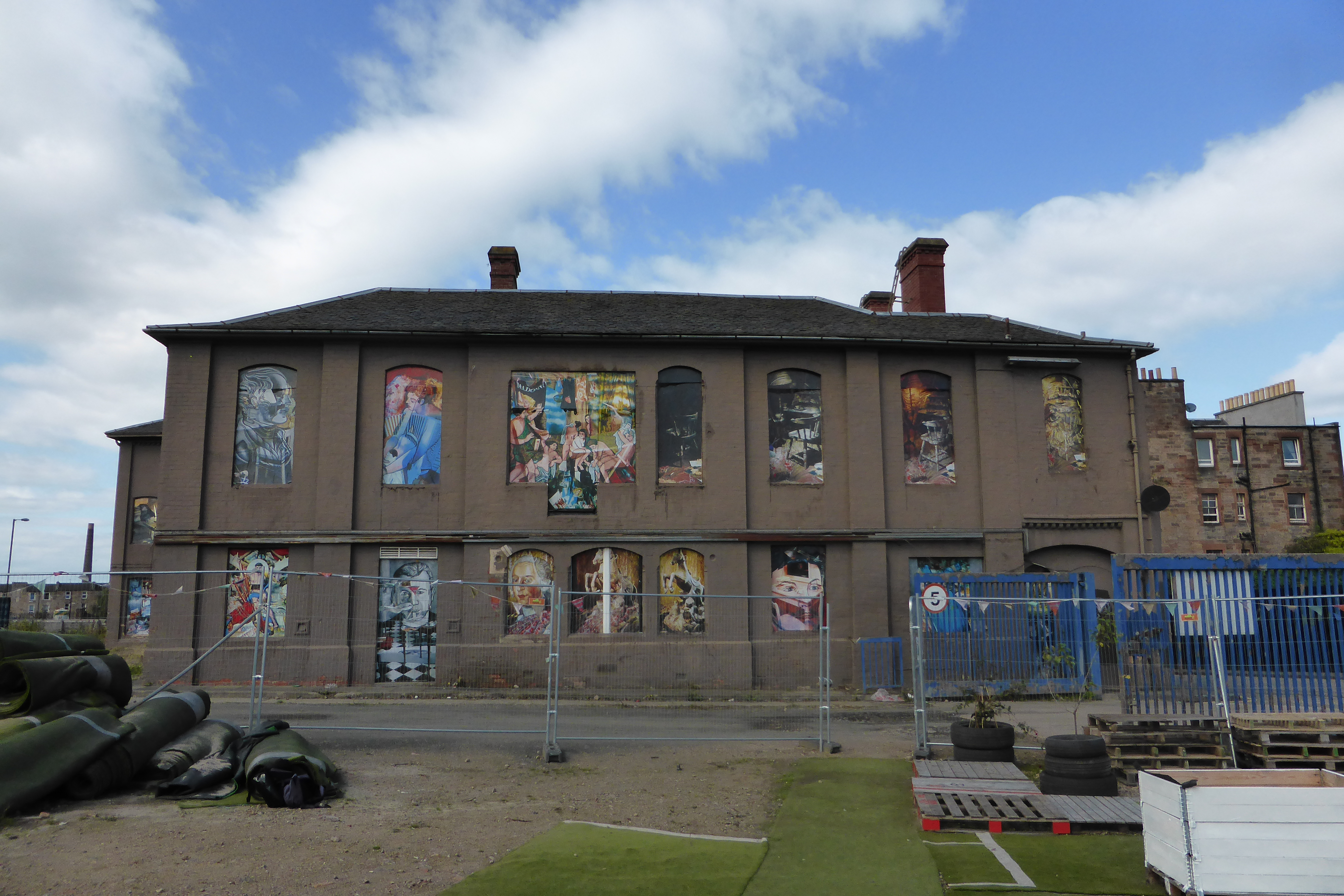
The new building during renovation

In 2019 the Printmakers moved from its former home on Union Street to Castle Mills, Dundee Street in Fountainbridge, a building which was once the headquarters for the North British Rubber Company. They opened with exhibitions by German printmaker Thomas Kilpper and Scottish artist Callum Innes. Janet Archer was appointed CEO in 2021

The building at Castle Mills won architecture awards for re-use and social impact. The organisation is successful in winning subsidies and investment in order to ensure that creative art spaces are open to the public. It is now offers access print studio printmaking facilities for artists using traditional and digital processes. The facilities include dedicated learning space, art galleries, a shop, café and print archive.
