= The Showroom =

Art gallery in Marylebone, London

Coordinates: 51°31′24.3″N 0°10′22″W

The Showroom is a not-for-profit art gallery in Marylebone, London, which displays site-specific works by emerging artists. The gallery presents four shows each year, a schedule that allows artists the time to develop and realise their work on site.

Established in 1983, the gallery was based at a site in Bethnal Green, East London. In 2008, the gallery relocated to a building in Marylebone, London, on Penfold Street, which was converted by Berlin-based architects ifau + Jesko Fezer.

Solo shows at The Showroom in the former East End space included Mona Hatoum, Sam Taylor-Wood, Simon Starling, Christina Mackie, Jim Lambie, Claire Barclay, and Eva Rothschild.

The Showroom receives fixed-term funding from Arts Council of England and other organisations and individuals. The director Gabriela Salgado was appointed in July 2022, when Elvira Dyangani Ose left to become director of the Barcelona Museum of Contemporary Art (MACBA). Previous directors were Emily Pethick, Kirsty Ogg, Kim Sweet and David Thorp.
