= Transmission Gallery =

- Established: 1983
- Location: King St, Glasgow, UK
- Type: Art Gallery
- Website: www.transmissiongallery.org

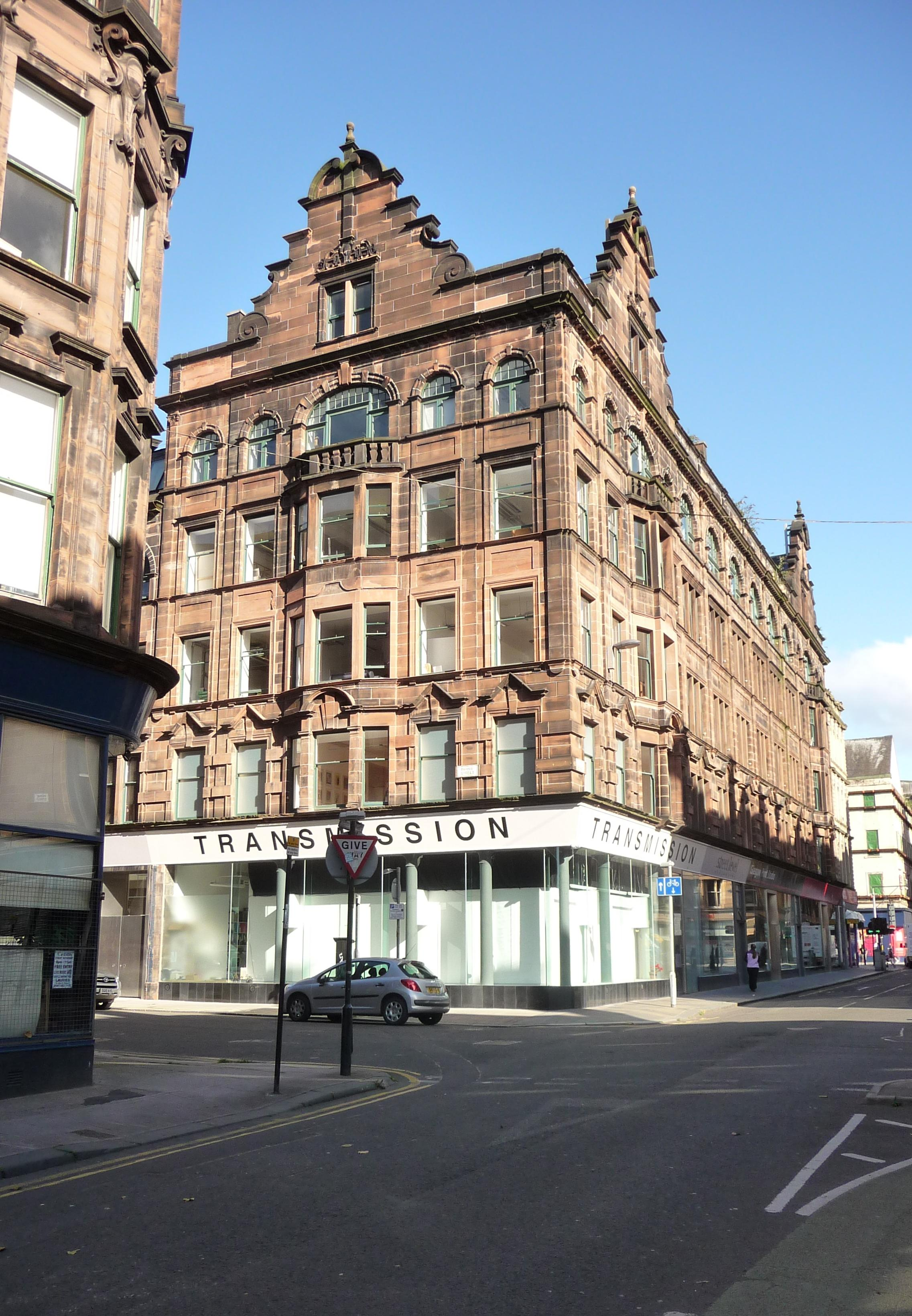
Transmission Gallery, Glasgow, photographed in 2017

Transmission Gallery is an artist-run space in Glasgow. It was established in 1983 by graduates of Glasgow School of Art. It primarily shows the work of young early career artists and is run by a changing voluntary committee of six people. Among the artists who have served on its committee are Douglas Gordon, Claire Barclay, Roderick Buchanan, Christine Borland, Jacqueline Donachie, Martin Boyce, Simon Starling, Lucy Skaer, Adam Benmakhlouf, Alberta Whittle, Ashanti Sharda Harris and Katherine Ka Yi Liu 廖加怡.

== History ==
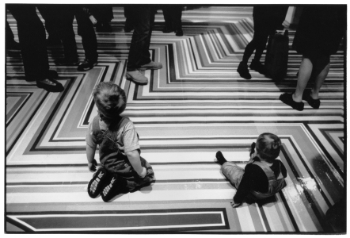
Jim Lambie exhibition at Transmission, Glasgow, 1999

Transmission is Glasgow's oldest artist-run gallery, established in 1983 by art school graduates who felt dissatisfied with the opportunities available to them on graduating. From its inception the gallery has been run by a changing committee and offered membership. When it was founded, it was supported by the Scottish Arts Council and Glasgow City Council. Its first address was 13–15 Chisholm Street, Trongate, Glasgow. On the opening night Alexander Moffat gave a speech, calling the gallery 'far more important than the Burrell Collection.'

As well as exhibitions, the gallery's programme has always included talks, readings and events. Curator Craig Richardson notes that in the early days of Transmission, the gallery's membership 'was encouraged to take advantage of the gallery typewriter and telephone which were domestic rarities for mainly unemployed artists in the late 1980s and early 1990s.'

In 1989 the gallery moved to 28 King Street, Trongate, Glasgow. The new space was a 'white cube' gallery. Nicola White wrote in 1995:

'Previously the gallery had deliberately positioned itself outside the cultural mainstream. In the early '90s Transmission became, not mainstream, but certainly more allied to the international art scene. Entering the clean-lined space, once could have been in any city in Europe. Alliances and exchanges were made with like-minded artists and galleries in such places as Belfast, London, Chicago and Cologne. The gallery became increasingly recognised outside of Scotland, and increasingly reviewed in the press.'

Several artists associated with the gallery (either through serving on the committee, being a member, or showing at the gallery) have gone on to win or be nominated for the Turner Prize.

The resource room at Transmission Gallery holds a physical library, a collection of slides and visual material left by artists, as well as the Transmission Archive. The Archive includes the gallery's exhibition and events poster archive. The Transmission website also displays encounters with the archive by invited researchers and artists, these are available to view on the website for two years post publishing.

In June 2017 the Gallery announced that it would postpone its annual members' show due to burnout among several members of the committee, who were holding down multiple paid and unpaid positions.

In 2018 Transmission Gallery was dropped from Creative Scotland's portfolio of regularly funded organisations (RFOs) for its 2018–2021 cycle. This caused surprise and consternation among many artists, curators and former Transmission committee members. Amanda Catto (Head of Visual Arts at Creative Scotland) said the decision ‘was not taken with any intention to damage Transmission. We respect and value their very long and quite exceptional history in terms of being an artist-run space’.

== Committee ==
The first committee of Transmission, from 1983 to 1986, was Alastair Magee, Lesley Raeside, John Rogan, Michelle Baucke and Alistair Strachan.

The second committee, from 1986 to 1988, was Gordon Muir, Malcolm Dickson, Carol Rhodes, Peter Thompson, Simon Brown and Douglas Aubrey.

From 1988 to the present the following people have been among those on the committee: Douglas Gordon, Christine Borland, Claire Barclay, Roderick Buchanan, Jacqueline Donachie, Katrina Brown, Martin Boyce, Simon Starling, Eva Rothschild, Tanya Leighton, Toby Webster, Lucy Skaer, Adam Benmakhlouf, Alberta Whittle, Ashanti Sharda Harris and Katherine Ka Yi Liu 廖加怡.

Each committee member serves for a minimum of two years. Matt Locke has noted that this means that 'patterns cannot become fossilised, but need to change and remain flexible.'

== Exhibitions ==
Notable exhibitions at Transmission have included:

- Urban Life (2 December - 8 January 1983) | This was the first exhibition at Transmission and was curated by Ken Currie, Matthew Inglis and Lesley Raeside.
- Fifth International Festival of Plagiarism: Slogans of Reversal/Reversal of Slogans (August 1989) | This was the first exhibition in the new Transmission space on King Street. It was a group show, and included the work of Nathan Coley, Douglas Gordon, Ross Sinclair and Roderick Buchanan, amongst others.
- Lubaina Himid, Vernet's Studio (1994) | An early solo exhibition by Himid of 26 painted pieces.
- Wet Flannel On My Side, Like a Saddle on a Horse: Angharad Williams, Sebastian Ymai, Orestis Lazouras, Lee Lozano (1 October - 5 November 2016) | Included a notable loan of two drawings by Lee Lozano.
- Rabiya Choudry, COCO!NUTS (15 September - 20 October 2018) | First solo exhibition of this Glasgow-based artist, that examined her experience of growing up in a mixed race family in a city and art world that is predominantly white - her mother is white and her father is from Pakistan.
