= Roderick Buchanan =

Scottish artist (born 1965)

Roderick Buchanan (born 1965) is a Scottish artist working in the fields of installation, film and photography.

After attending Thomas Muir High School, Buchanan studied at the Glasgow School of Art in the 1980s, where he was part of a group later described as "The Irascibles", which included fellow students Douglas Gordon, Ross Sinclair, Jacqueline Donachie, Christine Borland and Martin Boyce.

Work in Progress (1995) is a set of photographs of amateur Scottish footballers wearing the team shirts of Inter Milan and AC Milan. His 2004 film about Indian and Scottish soldiers, History Painting, was commissioned by the British Council for the 11th Indian Triennale.

In 2000, he won the inaugural Beck's Futures prize for his work Gobstopper, a video of children trying to hold their breath while being driven through Glasgow's Clyde Tunnel. In 2004 he was awarded a Paul Hamlyn Award.

He has had solo exhibitions at Dundee Contemporary Arts (2000) and the Camden Arts Centre (2005), and his work is held in the collections of the Tate and the National Galleries of Scotland.

In 2011, Buchanan exhibited Legacy at the Imperial War Museum in London. The work, a video and photographic installation commissioned by the museum, depicted Scottish bands from the Irish republican and British Unionist communities performing in Northern Ireland.

In 2017, Buchanan was commissioned by Fermynwoods Contemporary Art to spend time in Corby meeting second and third-generation Scottish immigrants who moved to England to find work in the steel industry, through long engaging with standing football supporters clubs.
