= Claire Barclay =

Scottish artist

- Born: 1968 (age 57–58); Paisley, Scotland
- Style: installation, sculpture and printmaking

Claire Barclay (born 1968) is a Scottish artist. Her artistic practice uses a number of traditional media that include installation, sculpture and printmaking, but it also expands to encapsulate a diverse array of craft techniques. Central to her practice is a sustained exploration of materials and space.

"While there is always a concept behind the work its actual form comes out of the 'play' with materials and my response to them"

== Early life and education ==
Claire Barclay received a Master of Fine Arts from the Glasgow School of Art, where she focused on environmental art. She graduated in 1993 with an MA.

== Career ==
Barclay's first solo exhibition was at Transmission Gallery, Glasgow in 1994. In 2003, Barclay represented Scotland in the Venice Biennale. Her work was the focus of a solo exhibition at the Tate Britain in 2004. In 2009 she had a solo exhibition at the Fruitmarket Gallery, which documented significant works created by Barclay over the previous 12 years, alongside newly-commissioned installations. She has had several solo exhibitions at Stephen Friedman Gallery, London. In 2017 she showed new large scale sculptural work at Tramway Gallery in Glasgow, and the work made here amongst others were reworked and adapted at Mission Gallery, Swansea, in 2018. She was elected to the Royal Scottish Academy in 2024.

=== Themes ===
Situated within realms of the domestic, Barclay's work juxtaposes the reified space of the gallery with that of the everyday. The objects present within her installations allude to dichotomies between function and dysfunction; subsequently, this imbues them with qualities of both the familiar and strange, simultaneously imparting them with an elusory nature.

=== Style ===
Barclay creates large-scale installations, often made in situ and in response to the spaces in which they are shown. Her practice is also deeply rooted in process and craftsmanship; accordingly, her installations include an array of materials that oscillate between those associated with mechanization and those associated with the domestic: steel, cast-concrete, machined aluminium, rubber, brass mesh, ceramic, leather, canvas and printed fabric. These dualities further position her artistic process between the handcrafted and industrially produced, as well as the natural and man-made.

== Selected exhibitions ==
- 'Nettverk Glasgow', Museet for Samtidskunst, Oslo, 1998
- Zenomap'. 50. Venice Biennale, 2003
- 'Art now: Claire Barclay. Half-light', Tate Britain, 2004
- 'Claire Barclay: silver gilt', Stephen Friedman Gallery, London, 2005
- 'Claire Barclay: shifting ground', Camden Arts Centre, London, 2008
- 'Claire Barclay: openwide', The Fruitmarket Gallery, Edinburgh, 2009
- 'Claire Barclay: Pale Heights', MUDAM, Luxenburg, 2009
- 'Claire Barclay: Shadow Spans', Whitechapel Gallery, 2010
- 'Overlap - Claire Barclay', Glasgow Print Studio, 2010
- 'Abstract Possible', Museo Tamayo, Mexico City, 2011
- 'Bright Bodies', Kelvinhall, Glasgow, 2016
- 'Yield Point', Tramway Gallery, Glasgow, 2017
- 'Deep Spoils', Mission Gallery, Swansea, 2018
- 'Skiffing', Edinburgh College of Art, 2019

== Public collections ==
- Arts Council Collection
- British Council
- Moderna Museet
- National Galleries Scotland
- Mudam, Luxembourg

== Awards ==
- Artist in Residence, 200 Gertrude Street, Melbourne, 1997
- Three Year AHRB Fellowship, Glasgow School of Art, 2000
- Paul Hamlyn Foundation Artist's Award, 2007
- The Hospital Club Creative Award for Art, 2008
- Residency, Statens Vaerksteder for Kunst, Copenhagen, 2011
- Residency, The Banff Centre, Banff, 2013
- Residency, Edinburgh College of Art, 2019

== Publications ==
- 'Claire Barclay: Ideal Pursuits', exhibition catalogue, Dundee Contemporary Arts, Dundee, 2003
- 'Claire Barclay: Fault on the Right Size', exhibition catalogue, Kunstverein Braunschweig, 2007
- 'Claire Barclay: openwide', exhibition catalogue, The Fruitmarket Gallery, Edinburgh, 2009
- 'Claire Barclay: Shadow Spans', Whitechapel Gallery, 2010
