= Martin John Callanan =

British conceptual artist

- Born: 1982 (age 42–43); Solihull, England, United Kingdom
- Education: Slade School of Fine Art
- Known for: Digital art, installation art, Conceptual art, Performance art, Photography
- Notable work: Departure of All, The Fundamental Units
- Awards: Philip Leverhulme Prize

Martin John Callanan (born 1982) is a British conceptual artist working in Scotland.

== Biography ==
Martin John Callanan was born in 1982 in Solihull. He works in Scotland. He taught at the Slade School of Fine Art from 2008 to 2019. Key exhibitions include White Cube Mason's Yard, Or Gallery, Berlin, Casal Solleric, Spain, Whitechapel Gallery, London, Imperial War Museum, International Film Festival Rotterdam and Whitstable Biennale. In 2013 Callanan was awarded the Philip Leverhulme Prize, an award for young academic researchers. Callanan worked with the Bank of England for 12 months from July 2015, and was a Fellow of the Royal Society of Arts.

== Artworks ==
Well known artworks include, "The Fundamental Units", a collaboration with the National Physical Laboratory imaging the world's lowest domination coins to massive scale using the latest microscopes.

I Wanted to See All of the News From Today, a web based program collecting front covers of newspapers from around the world, won an Honorary mention (best online project) at Live 2011 Grand Prix (Finland), and a finalist for both File Prix Lux (Brazil), and Screengrab 2010 Award, (Australia)

Callanan legally changed his name by deed poll from Martin John Callanan to Martin John Callanan in 2008 and again in 2012. The latter performance, which involved a magistrate visiting the gallery, took place at the London Open at the Whitechapel Gallery, London: curator Kirsty Ogg said "It highlights the fact that there is a particular bureaucratic process that we're all subject to but are not necessarily aware of".

The 2012 Whitstable Biennale commissioned Wars During my Lifetime, about which New Statesman wrote: "A simple idea with high impact is Wars During my Lifetime by Martin John Callanan, which lists on newsprint all the wars that have taken place during his lifetime.". A town crier proclaimed the list along the seafront.

For another artwork, published by Book Works he sent letters to several world leaders saying "I respect your authority" and published replies by figures including Hosni Mubarak; critic Jonathan Jones (journalist) found the work humorous but struggled to find any point to it: "He sent out a letter to various presidents saying, "I respect your authority." Amazingly, he got loads of replies. Hosni Mubarak seemed genuinely flattered. You laugh. Then you laugh again, but not so loud. Then you stop laughing and wonder what the point is. That world leaders are rather polite?"

He has also produced an artwork out of his social media status where every update since 2007 has read "Martin John Callanan is okay".

"Location of I" published Callanan's precise physical location every second for two years from 2007. The artwork was commissioned during a six-month residency at RIXC in Latvia. It was presented at "9th international festival Art+Communication held in Liepāja.

== Other works ==
While working at UCL Environment Institute he collaborated with science writer Richard Hamblyn on a number of projects, documented in their book Data Soliloquies (Slade Press, 2009, ISBN 9780903305044). A Planetary Order (2009) combines satellite images into an advanced sculpture made using high-end 3D Printing, to show the planet earth covered in clouds. Text Trends was based on Google searches for terms related to climate change over a five years.
