= Adrian Morris =

Adrian Morris may refer to:

- Adrian Morris (painter)
- Adrian Morris (actor)
