= Christine Mackie =

Christine Mackie may refer to:

- Christine Mackie (musician), American vocalist and percussionist, wife of Jeff Rosenstock
- Christine Mackie (actress), British actress (Coronation Street, Downton Abbey, My Phone Genie, The Grand, Dalziel and Pascoe)
- Christina Mackie (born 1956), British artist
- Vera Christine Mackie (born 1955), Australian academic
