= Nathan Coley =

British artist

Nathan Coley (born 1967) is a contemporary British artist. He was shortlisted for the Turner Prize in 2007 and has held both solo and group exhibitions internationally, as well as his work being owned by both private and public collections worldwide.

== Early life and education ==
Nathan Coley was born in Glasgow, Scotland, in 1967.

He studied Fine Art at Glasgow School of Art between 1985 and 1989 with the artists Christine Borland, Ross Sinclair and Douglas Gordon among others.

== Career and art practice ==
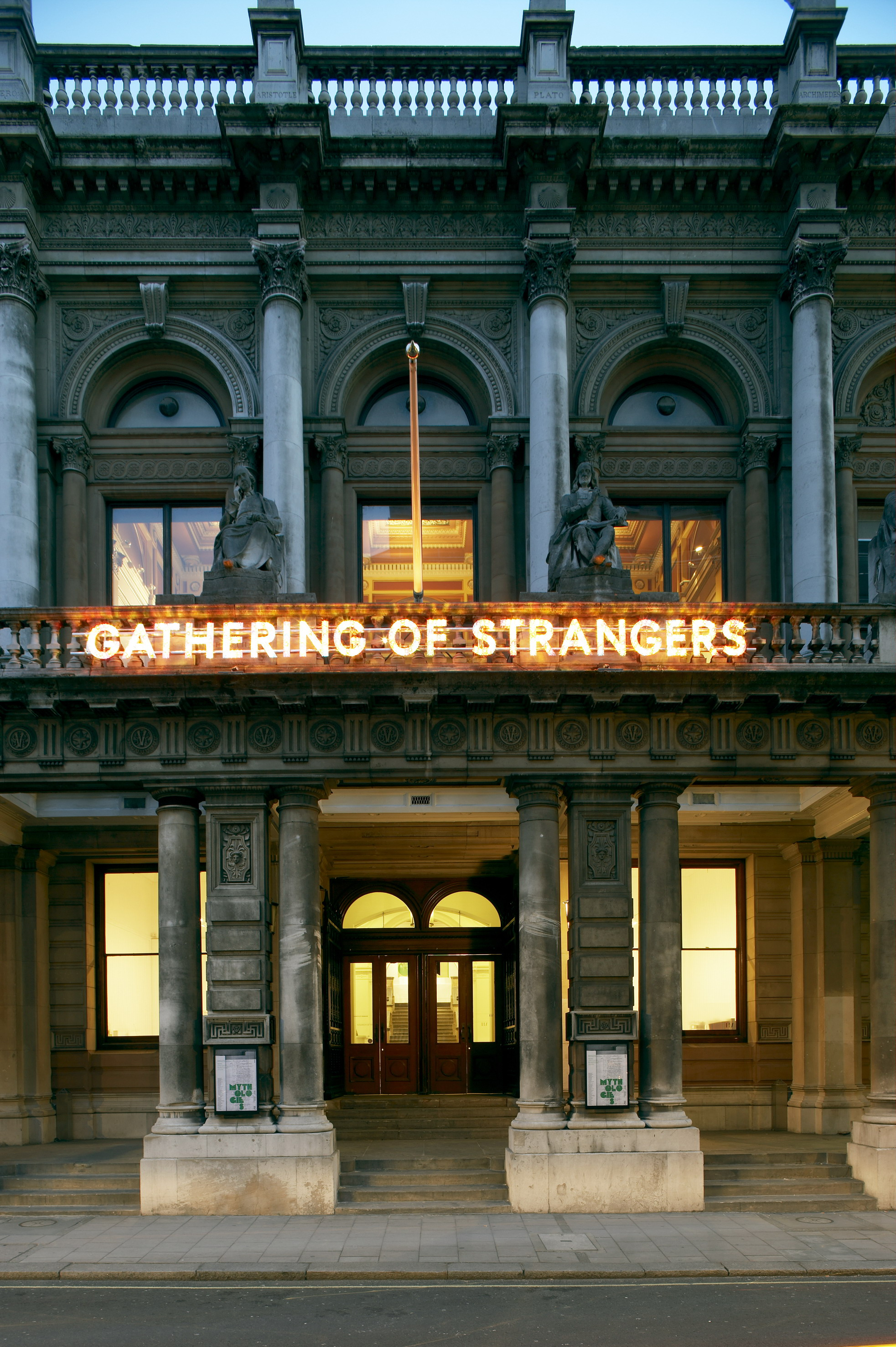
Gathering of Strangers: Nathan Coley at Haunch of Venison gallery in London

Coley is interested in the idea of 'public' space, and his practice explores the ways in which architecture becomes invested - and reinvested - with meaning. Across a range of media, Coley investigates what the built environment reveals about the people it surrounds and how the social and individual response to it is in turn culturally conditioned. Using the readymade as a means to take from and re-place in the world, Coley addresses the ritual forms we use to articulate our beliefs - from hand-held placards and erected signs to religious sanctuaries.

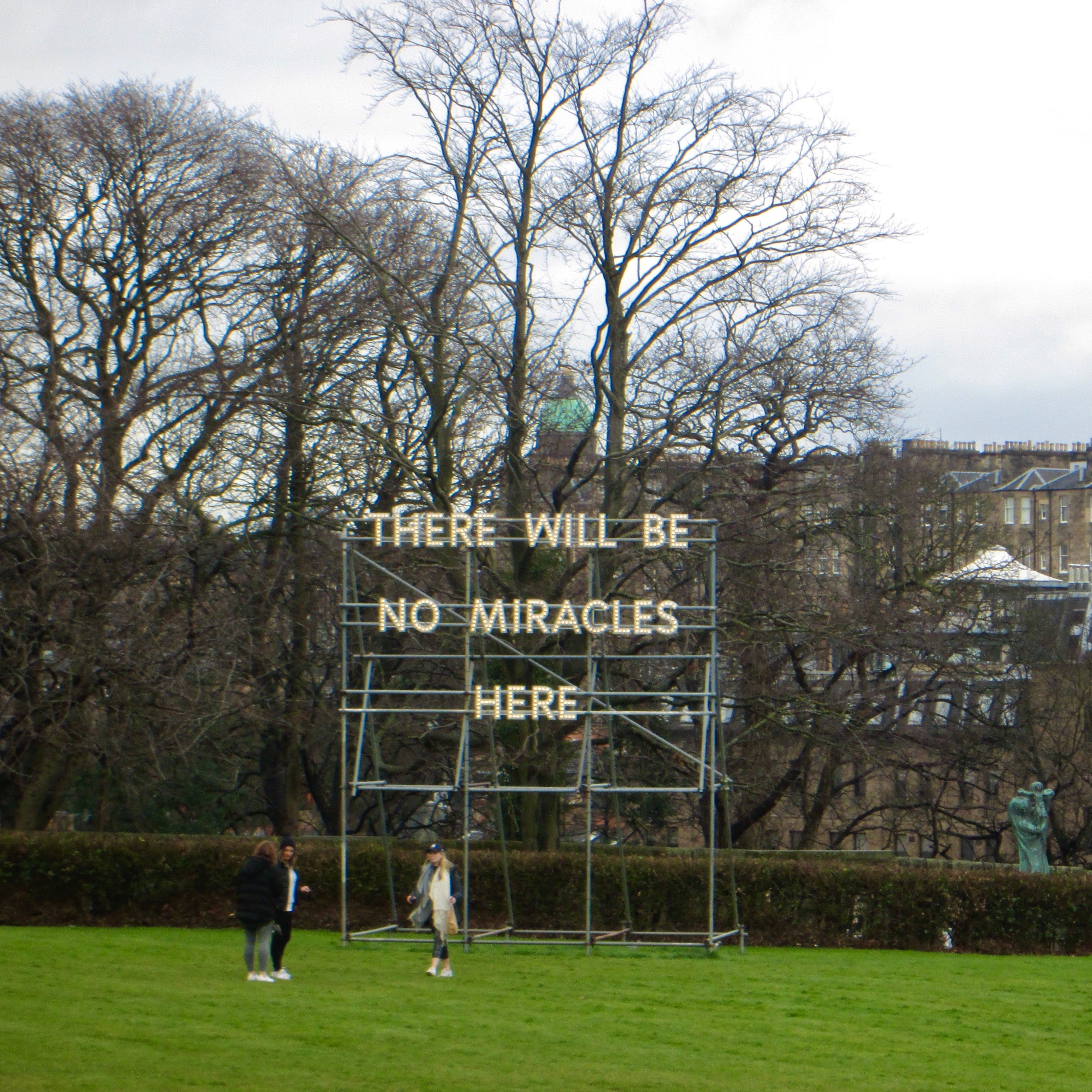
Sculpture at the Scottish National Gallery of Modern Art's Dean Gallery in 2017.

In 2004, Coley exhibited at The Fruitmarket Gallery Coley, the artist constructed a series of scaled down, cardboard replicas of all of the religious buildings in Edinburgh. InLamp of Sacrifice, 286 miniature sites of worship are placed in direct confrontation with one another, exploring how religious buildings are characterised by competing social ideologies.

In 2007, Coley was nominated for the Turner Prize for his exhibition at Mount Stuart, Isle of Bute, the public installation Camouflage Church, Santiago de Compostela, Spain and his contribution to the group exhibition 'Breaking Step – Displacement, Compassion and Humour in Recent British Art' at the Museum of Contemporary Art, Belgrade, Serbia. For his exhibition at Mount Stuart in 2006, Coley displayed an illuminated text, There Will Be No Miracles Here, on a scaffolding framework 6 metres (20 ft) high by 6 metres (20 ft) wide erected within the house's 18th century landscaped garden. Investigating the relationship between the rational and the spiritual, Coley's sculpture went on to be exhibited at Tate Liverpool and the Scottish National Gallery of Modern Art, where it became part of the collection in 2010.

In 2010–2011, The Ballast Project was built for the Government Buildings Agency as a commission for the National Maritime Museum (Het Nederlands Scheepvaartmuseum) in Amsterdam. This installation groups together a collection of bricks which were originally used as ballast for ships departing from the Netherlands for the West India Company during the 17th century.

In 2011, Coley exhibited at the ACCA (Australian Centre for Contemporary Art) in Melbourne. Appearances consisted of vast concrete platforms elevated off of the floor with adjoining steps. Inspired by Oscar Niemeyer's architectural designs, Coley's Landings]are characterised by a sense of theatricality which renders the viewer, or participant, aware of his or her interaction with the work.

In Memory is an installation which was created in 2011 in Edinburgh at Jupiter Artland. In Memory]consists of an enclosed, artificial graveyard on the edge of an area of Scottish woodland. By chiselling out the names on the salvaged tombstones, Coley draws our attention to the manner in which we invest architectural objects with individual meaning.

Coley's exhibition A Place Beyond Belief showed at Haunch of Venison in 2012 and included a range of photographic and sculptural work relating to the ritualised nature of protest and mourning. Included in the show was an illuminated, scaffolded text, A Place Beyond Belief, which was originally sourced from the testimony of a New Yorker describing a subway journey she made in the days following the 9/11 attacks. An edition of the work was also unveiled outside Kosova Art Gallery in Prishtina, Kosovo on the occasion of their independence from UN supervision.

Coley's solo exhibition at Parafin in 2017 included a range of sculptural works and large illuminated text works. The centrepiece of the show was a major new sculptural work called, Tate Modern on Fire (2017). While the work questions the status of the institution, as with all of Coley's work, a rich and complex ambiguity pervades. Is the fire a proposal or a warning?

In 2019, Coley returned to Parafin with a solo exhibition entitled The Future Is Inside Us, It's Not Somewhere Else. This show featured new work from Coley consisting of a series of large-scale custom-made lightboxes which combine original wallpaper from Zuber & Cie with short texts selected by the artist. The sources for the texts vary from classic American literature such as Mark Twain's The Adventures of Huckleberry Finn (1884) and JD Salinger's The Catcher in the Rye (1951) to a contemporary CNN news report about migrants at the US/Mexico border. Puncturing the idealised landscapes with words and phrases 'borrowed from the world', Coley invites the viewer to reflect on ideas of utopia, identity and our relationship to place.

Coley has had many international solo exhibitions, including those at Centro Cultural de Belem, Lisbon in 2001 and Westfalischer Kunstverein, Munster in 2000. His work was also included in Days Like These, a group exhibition at Tate Britain in 2003, and his film Jerusalem Syndrome was on view at the Cooper Gallery in Dundee in 2005.

Coley's solo show entitled Nathan Coley: No Golden Rules, concluded in July 2023 at The Page Gallery in South Korea. The exhibition featured a selection of important works emblematic of his practice: a series of signature large-scale illuminated text works; related small-scale lightbox works, and a group of sculptures representing buildings from different faiths. The exhibition's title is taken from a phrase by the humanist playwright, critic and philosopher George Bernard Shaw (1856-1950), who said that 'The Golden Rule is that there are no golden rules'.

Coley's installation entitled We Must Cultivate Our Garden, was exhibited outside of the Tate Modern from 24 June 2023 to 31 March 2024. The words are taken from the satirical novella Candide (1759) by the French writer and philosopher Voltaire (1694-1778).

== Recognition and awards ==
Coley has been awarded with the Artist Award, Scottish Arts Council (2003, 1996), Henry Moore Fellowship (Duncan of Jordanstone College of Art, University of Dundee (2001), Creative Scotland Award, Scottish Arts Council (2001), Scottish Cultural Enterprise, 'Scotland's Year of the Artist,' Public Art Initiative Scheme, Scottish Arts Council (2000) and the RSA, Art for Architecture Award (1997).

Residencies include:

- 2002 Lockerbie, The Scottish Court in the Netherlands, Holland (unofficial)
- 2000 Paisley University, Chemistry Department
- 1992 Crawford Arts Centre, St Andrews

== Selected publications ==
- Nathan Coley, to the Bramley Family of Frestonia, a publication documenting his public art project in London. 2015
- Nathan Coley, Mount Stuart, Isle of Bute, Scotland 2006
- Nathan Coley – There Will be no Miracles Here, Fruitmarket Gallery, Edinburgh/Locus +, Newcastle upon Tyne
