= Haluk Akakçe =

Turkish contemporary artist (1970–2023)

Haluk Akakçe (1970 – 9 October 2023) was a Turkish contemporary artist living and working in New York and Istanbul whose work explored the intersections between society and technology through video animations, wall paintings and sound installations. He trained in architecture at Bilkent University, Ankara, then graduated with an MFA from The School of the Art Institute of Chicago. Akakçe's work appeared in the Istanbul and São Paulo Biennials, the New Museum of Contemporary Art in New York and the Walker Art Center. Among solo shows, Akakçe exhibited at the P.S.1 Contemporary Art Center in New York and the Berlin KunstWerke. He was shortlisted for the Beck's Futures award at the Institute of Contemporary Arts in London in 2004.

In November 2006, Akakçe's The Sky is the Limit animated the 12.5 million LEDs of the enormous Viva Vision canopy on Fremont Street in downtown Las Vegas, a public art project in collaboration with Creative Time, the City of Las Vegas Arts Commission and the Fremont Street Experience. At 8 p.m. each evening that month, the entire street was plunged into darkness before Akakçe's animation began to trickle across the LED surface, gradually turning the canopy into a cascade of abstractions and colors.

Akakçe died on 9 October 2023, at the age of 53.

== Gallery representation ==
Akakçe was represented by Richard Taittinger Gallery in New York. In March 2015, his work was featured in the gallery's inaugural group exhibition, Sinthome. In May 2015, a solo exhibition, Come Midnight, was Akakçe's first U.S. presentation in nearly a decade.

== Recent solo exhibition history ==
- Come Midnight, Richard Taittinger Gallery, New York (2015)
- Haluk Akakçe: Open Studio, Galerist, Istanbul, Turkey (2012)
- Love Time Garden, Galerist, Istanbul, Turkey (2012)
- We Invite You to Fall in Love, Istanbul State Opera and Ballet, Galerist and The British Consulate, Istanbul, Turkey (2012)
- The Dervish, Galerie Bob van Orsouw, Zürich, Switzerland (2010)
- Coming Home, Alison Jacques Gallery, London, UK (2010)
- Reincarnation, Galerist and Tabanlioglu, Istanbul, Turkey (2009)
- Fairy Tales Can Come True, It Can Happen to You, Galerist Tophane, Istanbul, Turkey (2009)
- They Call It Love, I Call It Madness, Galerie Bob van Orsouw, Zürich, Switzerland; Deitch Projects, New York (2007)
- Definition, Galerist, Istanbul, Turkey (2007)
- The Garden, The Approach, London, UK (2007)
- Moving Through the Looking Glass, Maison Louis Vuitton Champs-Elysées, Paris, France (2007)
- Haluk Akakçe, Bernier/Eliades, Athens, Greece (2007)
- Haluk Akakçe: Sky is the Limit, Creative Time, New York; Las Vegas Art Society, Las Vegas, NV (2006)
- I wish I was..., Galerie Max Hetzler, Berlin, Germany (2006)
- Haluk Akakçe: Videos, Sheldon Memorial Art Museum, Lincoln, NE (2005)
- Tomorrow is Another Day, Galerie Max Hetzler, Berlin, Germany (2005)
- Panorámica, Museo Tamayo Arte Contemporaneo, Mexico City, Mexico (2005)
- Haluk Akakçe, Rochester Contemporary Art Center, Rochester, NY (2005)
- Haluk Akakçe, Centro Atlantico de Arte Moderno, Las Palmas, Spain (2005)
- Come To Me And The World Will Be Ours Tonight, Galleria Massimo De Carlo, Milan, Italy (2005)
