= Nick Crowe (artist) =

British artist

Nick Crowe (born 1968) is an English artist from Yorkshire. He works in a range of raw materials and live comic situations; some of his earlier work is internet-based. He is a Senior Lecturer in Fine Art Practice at Goldsmiths, University of London. Crowe lives in Berlin and works in London and Manchester. You can also find Crowe live streaming on Twitch as he documents his artistic progress in his rustic Berlin countryside barn.

== Biography ==
Crowe was born in Barnsley and studied English literature and drama at Hull University. He began working in experimental theatre and performance in 1989, establishing Index Theatre Co-operative with David Whitaker, Julian Hammond, Jane Gant, Adele Fowles and Les Hampson. Index changed its membership over time, producing innovative performance works.

Crowe then went on to develop his practice in a range of media including film, drawing, new media and etched glass. His art uses a range of strategies including the exploration of the role of technology and its effects on everyday life.

Since the 1990s he was involved in setting up a range of artist-led initiatives including The Annual Programme in Manschester (1995–2000) and The Manchester Pavilion at the Venice Biennale (2001–2005). In 2003, he and regular collaborator Ian Rawlinson co-curated Artranpennine03, a trans-regional exhibition of public art.

Several of Crowe's pieces are internet-based. SERVICE 2000, for example, was a ring of spoof websites for notable art galleries. Other work, like "Discrete Packets" and "Police Radio" use the web as a medium for exploring wider cultural concerns. Crowe also works a great deal in more traditional art media including film and photography as well as installation and publishing. He also produces engraved glass works which deal with subjects as wide as internet memorial web pages and the occupation of Iraq. Some film and video work, uploaded to YouTube has engaged with the pitfalls and possibilities of the online participatory culture with increasingly subtle use of displacement and irony.

In 2003, Chisenhale Gallery commissioned Crowe to produce "Getting On", a reflection on age, youth and contemporary Britain, that comprised "a group of metallic-finish, scarlet mobility scooters and a soundtrack of Deutsche Grammophon classical pieces. In the same year, Nick Crowe was shortlisted for the Beck's Futures prize.

== Crowe & Rawlinson ==
Since 1994 Crowe also has a collaborative practice with Manchester based artist Ian Rawlinson. Together they have worked on many projects using boredom to deal with issues surrounding national identity, politics and faith.

Exhibitions include:

- 'Song for Coal', Yorkshire Sculpture Park, Wakefield, 2014
- 'Ride Across Lake Constance' (collaboration with Awst & Walter), LoBe, Berlin, 2013
- 'Six White Horses', Whitworth Art Gallery, Manchester, 2013
- 'The Opera', Plataforma Revolver, Lisbon, 2012
- 'Nick Crowe and Ian Rawlinson', SALT, Istanbul, 2012
- 'Towards A Free Society', Institute of Jamais Vu, London, 2012
- 'Stolen Artifact', Kotti Shop, Berlin, 2011
- 'The Fireworks', Gallery Kit, St Louis, 2011
- 'No Sign of Helicopters', Ceri Hand Gallery, Liverpool, 2010
- 'Nick Crowe & Ian Rawlinson', Newlyn Art Gallery, Penzance, 2008
- 'At 25 Metres', FACT, Liverpool (cat.), 2007
- 'Nick Crowe and Ian Rawlinson', Manchester Art Gallery; Aspex Gallery, Portsmouth (cat.), 2003
- 'Explaining Urbanism to Wild Animals', Tmesis Gallery, Manchester, 2002
- 'Two Speakers', ICA, London, 1999
- 'Mugger Music', LMCC, multiple sites, New York (with Graham Parker), 1997
- 'Mugger Music', Manchester International Arts, multiple sites, Manchester (with Graham Parker), 1996

In 2009, they were shortlisted for the Northern Art Prize.
