= Matt Stokes =

British artist

Matt Stokes (born 1973 in Penzance) is an artist and film-maker. Stokes had a residency at Grizedale Arts in 2002 during which he researched the history of rave culture in the Lake District. In 2006, he won the Beck's Futures art prize for his film Long After Tonight.

In 2005, Stokes developed Sacred Selections, a series of experimental transcriptions of Underground Music, then performed live on historic Pipe Organs in Dundee, following a commission by Dundee Contemporary Arts. Recordings based from these live performances were released on a CD also titled Sacred Selections. In 2006 Sacred Selections was shown as part of EASTinternational which was selected by Jeremy Deller and Dirk Snauwaert, and presented as a series of organ recitals replacing ecclesiastical music with happy hardcore, Northern soul and black metal.

From the liner notes:-

'Sacred Selections was conceived by artist Matt Stokes, and comprises three pipe organ recitals that present music chosen by people from a range of underground music and cultures strongly represented within Dundee - Northern Soul, Happy Hardcore and Black Metal.'
