= Tim Stoner =

Tim Stoner (born 1970 in Essex) is an English painter. Growing up in London, he attended Leyton Sixth Form College. He trained at the Norwich School of Art & Design 1989–92, the Royal College of Art, London (where in 1994 he graduated with an MA in Painting), and the Rijksakademie Van Beeldende Kunsten (Royal Academy of Visual Arts) in Amsterdam 1997–98. He won the Beck's Futures art award in 2001, and worked at the British School at Rome during the same year.

== Featured Exhibitions ==
Solo Exhibitions
Year	Exhibition	Venue	Location
2025	Negative Space	Pace London	London
2022	The Woven Field	Vardaxoglou	London
2022	Toil Stories (curated by Louis Blanc-Francard)	Vortic	Online
2021	Uprooted	Vardaxoglou	London
2020	Al-Andalus	Modern Art	London
2018	Works on Paper 2013-18	Modern Art	London
2016	Wisdom of the Crowd	Modern Art	London
2007	-	Alison Jacques Gallery	London
2004	Sombrero	Engholm Engelhorn Gallerie	Vienna
2003	Affinity	Junge Kunst	Wolfsburg
2002	Rise and Fall	The Approach	London
2002	The Power of Partnership	Stedelijk Museum Bureau	Amsterdam
2001	Natives	Kerstin Engholm Gallerie	Vienna
2000	Cash If You Die, Cash If You Don’t	The Approach	London
2000	Coupled	fig-1	London
1999	Freeholders	Henry Peacock Gallery	London

Group Exhibitions
Year	Exhibition	Venue	Location
2025	A Room Hung With Thoughts (curated by Tom Morton)	Green Family Art Foundation	Dallas
2024	Tweed	Speciale	London
2024	Excavation: Macro to the Micro (curated by Deborah Smith)	Vortic	Online
2024	Accordion Fields	Lisson Gallery	London
2022	The Kingfisher’s Wing (curated by Tom Morton)	Grimm Gallery	New York
2022	Spirit Matter	Vardaxoglou	London
2019	Slow Painting	Hayward Touring Exhibition - Leeds City Art Gallery	Leeds
2019	Fully Awake	Freedlands Foundation	London
2018	Telescope (curated by Nigel Cooke)	Hastings Contemporary	Hastings
2017	Awkward	Anna Zorina Gallery	New York
2016	Theories of Modern Art	Modern Art	London
2015	The London Open	Whitechapel Art Gallery	London
2014	Live and Let Die	Modern Art	London
2013	Speak, Clown!	Fold Gallery	London
2013	Scary	Neue Froth Kunsthalle	Brighton
2012	Seduction	Simon Oldfield Gallery, Carlos Place	London
2012	One Giant Leap	Works From The Saatchi Gallery at The Hyatt Regency	London
2012	The Perfect Nude	Charlie Smith Gallery (& Wimbledon Space / Phoenix, Exeter)	London
2011	From London (catalogue text by Martin Herbert)	Art Nueve Gallery	Murcia, Spain
2011	Peeping Tom	Kunsthal KAdE	Amersfort, NL
2011	Strictly Global! (selected by Okwui Enwezor, Hou Hanru, Udo Kittelmann & Nancy Spector)	The Deutsche Bank Towers	Frankfurt
2011	Der Menschen Klee	Kunst Im Tunnel, Kunsthalle	Düsseldorf
2010	Obfuscation	James Fuentes LLC	New York
2010	What Have I Done (With Neal Tait and Daniel Coombs)	The Fine Art Society	London
2010	Peeping Tom (Curated by Keith Coventry)	Vegas	London
2009	We’re Moving	The Royal College of Art	London
2009	The Clotted Body (With Rezi Van Lankveld)	Galerie Diana Stigter	Amsterdam
2008	Her House (Curated by Chantal Joffe)	Her House Gallery	London
2008	Politics	Galería Maisterravalbuena	Madrid
2007	Slimvolume Poster Publication	-	London
2007	Top Twenty	39	London
2007	Salon Nouveau	Engholm Engelhorn	Vienna
2006	Melancholy	Irit Mayer-Sommer Contemporary Art	Tel Aviv
2006	Responding to Rome	Estorick Collection of Modern Italian Art	London
2005	Hydrophobia 2	Zinger Presents	Tilburg, NL
2005	I Wish	Engholm Engelhorn	Vienna
2005	Daysleepers	BA-CA Kunstforum	Vienna
2005	25 Years of Deutsche Bank Collection	Deutsche Guggenheim, Museum of Contemporary Art	Berlin / Tokyo
2004	Britannia Works	Athens, British Council Exhibition (Curated by Katerina Gregos)	Athens
2004	She’s Come Undone	Artemis Greenberg Van Doren Gallery	New York
2003	Nation	Frankfurter Kunstverein	Frankfurt
2003	Dirty Pictures	The Approach	London
2003	Exploring Landscape: Eight Views from Britain	Andrea Rosen Gallery, Rijksakademie, Victoria Miro	New York / London
2003	Hydrophobia	Henry Peacock Gallery	London
2003	Man In The Middle	Museum of Modern Art (Passau, Kunsthalle Tübingen, St Petersburg, Saarbrücken, Mannheim, Bremen, Krakow)	Various Locations
2003	Blick aufs Ich / The View Upon The Ego	Neues Museum Weserburg	Bremen
2002	The Galleries Show	Royal Academy of Arts	London
2001	The Leisure Society	De Vleeshal	Middelburg, Netherlands
2001	Becks Futures	ICA London and touring	London / Various Locations
2000	Clara	Galerie Ascan Crone	Hamburg
1999	Pictures of Pictures	Touring: Arnolfini Gallery, Bristol and Norwich Gallery EAST International	Norwich
2001	ICA Futures (1st prize winner)	ICA London and touring - Fruitmarket Gallery Edinburgh and Bluecoat Gallery Liverpool	Various Locations
