= Inventory (artists) =

Inventory are a collective of British artists, writers and art theorists, founded in 1996.

Some of their pieces see them engage in performance art in public spaces.

Coagulum (Oxford Street) in 2000, saw them form into a close group on London's Oxford Street, thus disrupting the flow of pedestrians, before entering a shopping centre and dancing to the piped music. For another piece, they played football on The Mall with a rubber skull, using Buckingham Palace and Admiralty Arch as goals.

Other pieces, such as the installation Requiem for the Empty Quarter at The Approach Gallery in Bethnal Green during 2002, used modified and written-upon objects found on the street.

In 2003, Inventory were nominated for the Beck's Futures prize.
