= Saskia Olde Wolbers =

Dutch video artist (born 1971)

- Born: 1971 (age 54–55); Breda, The Netherlands
- Notable work: Pareidolia, Deadline, Trailer

Saskia Olde Wolbers (born 1971) is a Dutch video artist who lives and works in London.

== Background ==
Since the mid-1990s, Saskia Olde Wolbers has been developing fictional documentaries often loosely based on factual events. Her intricate videos are driven by a combination of otherworldly imagery – meticulously handmade model sets – and the apparent inner monologue of the voiceover in the audio book-like soundtrack. The films are shot underwater, miniature sets dipped in paint to create unstable imagery that abstractly illustrates the narrator's thought process. In her most recent works, the music soundtrack has been composed by Daniel Pemberton.

She has exhibited widely since 1998. Solo shows include: A Shot In The Dark at Vienna Secession, 2011; Goetz Collection, 2010; Mori Art Museum Tokyo, 2008; The Falling Eye at The Stedelijk Museum Amsterdam, 2006; and Tate Britain, London, 2003. In 2014 she created an audio installation at 87 Hackford Road, Brixton, London, the house in which Vincent van Gogh lodged briefly in 1873–74.

Author and curator Phillip Monk describes in his book The Saskia Olde Wolbers Files, "Olde Wolbers not only joins fictional and documentary elements in her scripts, she links them to series of images, themselves fabricated and quite fantastic in their nature."

In 2010, Olde Wolbers lectured for the Penny Stamps Distinguished Speaker Series.

She is a lecturer at Goldsmiths University.

== Awards and prizes ==
Olde Wolbers has won the Baloise Prize (2003) and the Beck's Futures Prize (2004).
