= Athanasios Argianas =

Greek and British artist

- Born: 1976 (age 49–50); Athens, Greece
- Education: Goldsmiths College, London; Kunstakademie Düsseldorf
- Occupations: Artist, musician
- Known for: Interdisciplinary art incorporating sculpture, painting, text, performance, and sound
- Notable work: References to early electronic instruments, experimental music, Constructivism, and concrete poetry

Athanasios Argianas (born 1976) is a Greek and British artist living and working in London, England. Argianas' practice is interdisciplinary; incorporating sculpture, painting, text, performance and often music or sound, and concerns itself with metaphorical or translated representations of aural experiences. He received his MA from Goldsmiths College, London and previously studied under Jannis Kounellis at the Kunstakademie Düsseldorf.

== Life and works ==
Athanasios Argianas was born in 1976 in Athens, Greece. In addition to his fine arts education and practice, Argianas is a conservatory trained musician and releases music under the moniker Gavouna. In his work, Argianas has been known to reference electronic instruments from the early 20th century, such as the theremin and the ondes martenot, experimental music and compositional methods from the 1960s, concrete poetry, the Constructivism of Naum Gabo, and even Marcel Duchamp’s Machine Optique (1920) and its circular deployment of language.

Argianas' work explores the contingency of sounds and forms and the possibility of new or different understanding arising through the translation between aural and material experiences. He oscillates between employing standardized systems for converting sound to object in some works and allowing for more intuitive translation in others. "Argianas makes objects that can be used for performances that in turn produce data which to define the shape of future objects." His work has been exhibited internationally, including solo exhibitions at the National Museum of Contemporary Art Athens, The Serpentine Gallery, London and a participation in Performa 13 in New York.

== Notable solo exhibitions ==
- 2021: "Hollowed Water" ARCH, Athens. https://artreview.com/athanasios-argianas-hollowed-water-review/
- 2020: "Hollowed Water", Camden Arts Centre, London. https://archive.camdenartscentre.org/archive/d/hollowed-water
- 2016:"readingmachinesmovingmachines" On Stellar Rays, New York, NY, USA
- 2014: Silence Breakers, Silence Shapers, Galerie Gabriel Rolt, Amsterdam, the Netherlands
- 2014: A Sequencer**, Aanant & Zoo, Berlin, Germany
- 2013: A Sequencer*, On Stellar Rays, New York, NY, USA
- 2011: Laid Long, Spun Thin, Max Wigram Gallery, London, UK
- 2011: The Length of Your Arms Unfolded, Performance and Installation, The Barbican Art Gallery, The Barbican Center, London, UK
- 2010: Art Nova, Art Basel Miami (with Pavel Büchler), FL, USA
- 2010: The Length of a Strand of Your Hair, of the Width of Your Arms, Unfolded, EMST, National Museum of Contemporary Art, Athens, Greece
- 2008: We All Turn This Way, Park Nights, Serpentine Gallery Pavilion (with Nick Laessing), The Serpentine Gallery, London, UK

== Notable group exhibitions ==
- 2022: Pattern Recognition Kunstpalais, Erlangen, Erlangen, Germany
- 2017: ANTIDORON. The EMST Collection, documenta 14, Fridericianum, Kassel, Germany
- 2016: The Promise of Total Automation, Kunsthalle Wien, Vienna, Austria
- 2016: Line, Lisson Gallery, London, UK
- 2014: Art of Its Own Making, The Pulitzer Museum, St. Louis, MO, USA
- 2014: Art or Sound, Fondazione Prada - Ca Corner Della Regina, Venice, Italy
- 2013: Performa 13, Biennial, New York, NY, USA
- 2013: In the Studio, Kunsthalle Athena, Athens, Greece
- 2012: The Imminence of Poetics, Curated by Luis Perez-Oramas, The 30th Sao Paulo Biennale, Sao Paulo, Brazil
- 2012: Coquilles Mécaniques, Cracalsace, Centre Rhénan d’Art Contemporain, Altkirch, France
- 2012: Sonic Time Speech / Sound / Silence From the EMST Collection, curated bz Anna Kafetsi, EMST National Museum of Contemporary Art, Athens, Greece
- 2011: A Rock and a Hard Place, 3rd Thessaloniki Biennale of Contemporary Art, Greece
- 2011: Art Now Live 2011, Tate Britain, London, UK
- 2010/11: Recent British Sculpture, Curated by Tom Morton, Grimm Gallery, Amsterdam, the Netherlands
- 2007: Pale Carnage, Curated by Martin Clark, Arnolfini, Bristol, UK (touring to Dundee Contemporary Arts, Dundee, UK)
