= Kirsty Ogg =

Scottish art curator

Kirsty Ogg (born Glasgow, Scotland) is the Director of Mimosa House and Lecturer in Curating at Goldsmiths, University of London. Previously, Ogg was the Director of New Contemporaries a curator at the Whitechapel Gallery and Director of The Showroom. After studying Sculpture at Edinburgh College of Art, Ogg became involved with Transmission Gallery, Glasgow as part of the organising committee in the mid-1990s. Ogg is listed in the Artlyst Power 100 List for the art world.
