= Richard Hamblyn =

British environmental writer and historian

Richard Hamblyn (born 1965) is a British environmental writer and historian. He is a lecturer in the Department of English, Theatre and Creative Writing at Birkbeck, University of London, and has contributed articles and reviews to the Sunday Times, The Guardian, the Independent, the Times Literary Supplement and the London Review of Books.

His books include The Invention of Clouds: How an Amateur Meteorologist Forged the Language of the Skies (2001), an account of the life and work of Luke Howard which won a 2001 Los Angeles Times Book Prize and was shortlisted for the 2002 Samuel Johnson Prize; Terra: Tales of the Earth (2009), a study of natural disasters, a BBC Wales Science Book of the Year; and an anthology of science writing, The Art of Science: a Natural History of Ideas (2011). He has also written four illustrated books on weather in association with the UK Met Office, including The Cloud Book (2008); Extraordinary Clouds (2009); and Extraordinary Weather (2012), and edited Daniel Defoe's first book, The Storm (1704) for Penguin Classics (2005). Works written in collaboration with the British landscape photographer Jem Southam include Clouds Descending (2009) and The River in Winter (2012).

In the academic year 2008–09 Hamblyn was writer-in-residence at the University College London Environment Institute, and produced the book Data Soliloquies (Slade, 2009) with Martin John Callanan who was artist-in-residence for the same year.

== Publications ==
=== Books by Richard Hamblyn ===
- The Invention of Clouds: How an Amateur Meteorologist Forged the Language of the Skies (Picador, 2001 ISBN 978-0330391955).
- Terra: Tales of the Earth (Picador, 2009 ISBN 978-0330490733)
- Extraordinary Clouds (D&C/Met Office, 2009 ISBN 978-07153-32818).
- Data Soliloquies (with Martin John Callanan) (Slade, 2009)
- The Met Office Pocket Cloud Book (D&C/Met Office, 2010; revised and updated edition 2023 ISBN 978-1446310113)
- The Art of Science: a Natural History of Ideas (Picador, 2011 ISBN 978-0330490764)
- Supercell (with Kevin Erskine) (Hatje Cantz, 2011)
- Extraordinary Weather (D&C/Met Office, 2012 ISBN 978-14463-01913).
- Tsunami: Nature and Culture (Reaktion, 2014)
- Clouds: Nature and Culture (Reaktion, 2017)
- The Cloud Book: How to Understand the Skies (D&C/Met Office, 2008; revised and updated edition 2021 ISBN 978-14463-08905)
- The Sea: Nature and Culture (Reaktion, 2021)

=== Other publications by Richard Hamblyn ===
- "The British Audiences for Volcanoes", in Transports: Travel, Pleasure and Imaginative Geography 1600–1830, ed. Chlöe Chard and Helen Langdon (Yale University Press, 1996)
- Literature & Science, 1660–1834, vol 3: 'Earthly Powers', ed. (Pickering & Chatto, 2003: one of an 8-volume series of edited anthologies of science-themed writing from the long eighteenth century
- The Storm by Daniel Defoe (1704), edited for Penguin Classics (2005, ISBN 978-0141-43992-1)
- "A Celestial Journey", Tate Etc, 5 (September 2005)
- "Hurrah For The Dredge", London Review of Books, 27:21 (3 November 2005)
- "Notes from Underground: Lisbon after the Earthquake", Romanticism, 14:2 (2008)
- "On Metal Beach", in Clouds Descending, ed. Jem Southam (Lowry Press, 2009)
- "The whistleblower and the canary: rhetorical constructions of climate change", Journal of Historical Geography 35:2 (2009)
- "Something to be Clever About", in A Book of King's, ed. Karl Sabbagh (Third Millennium, 2010)
- "Simply Putting on Weight (on the Atlantic salmon)", London Review of Books, 32:4 (25 February 2010)
- "Of Exactitude in Science", in Future Climate Change, ed. Mark Maslin and Samuel Randalls (Routledge, 2011)
- "Winter", in The River Winter, ed. Jem Southam (Mack, 2012)
- "Wilderness With a Cast of Thousands", Times Literary Supplement, 5743 (26 April 2013)
- "The Krakatoa Sunsets", The Public Domain Review: Selected Essays, ed. Adam Green (PDR Press, 2014)
- "Watchers of the Skies", Times Literary Supplement, 5851 (22 May 2015)
- "Cool Phenomena", Omega Lifetime, 17 (2016)
- "Porthmeor Beach", part of Katie Paterson's First There Is A Mountain project, Tate St. Ives (April 2019)
- "How Much Are They Paying You?", The Mechanics' Institute Review: The Climate Issue, 16 (Autumn 2019)
- "Where There Are Waves There Are Stories", The Passenger: Oceano (Iperborea, 2022)
- "Behold.... The Sea!", in BBC Proms Guide 2022 (BBC Publications, 2022)
- "Luke Howard, Namer of Clouds", Weather, 77:11 (November 2022)
- The Cloud Deck (David & Charles, 2026)
