= Bernd Behr =

Taiwanese artist (born 1976)

Bernd Behr (born 1976) is a Taiwanese artist. He is based in London.

== Biography ==
Born in Hamburg in 1976 and raised in Malaysia, Behr studied at San José State University, California and Goldsmiths, University of London, London.

Behr was shortlisted for the 2003 Beck's Futures prize at the Institute of Contemporary Arts, London. His work can be seen as a cultural archaeology of sites and events which share confluent histories of art, cinema and the built environment. He works across video, photography and sculpture to explore a dialogue between documentary and constructed approaches to his subjects and the associative, sometimes fictional, histories that emerge from them.

Behr currently teaches on the BA (Hons) Photography course at Camberwell College of Arts, University of the Arts London.

== Selected exhibitions and screenings ==
- 2010
  - COMMA 17: Bernd Behr, Bloomberg Space, London
  - UR-NOW: The Ruins of the Contemporary, Whitstable Biennale, Whitstable
  - Ça Va: A Prefabricated Movie Theatre by Berger&Berger, 12th International Architecture Exhibition, La Biennale di Venezia, Venice
  - America Deserta, Parc Saint Léger Centre d'Art Contemporain, Pougues-les-Eaux, France
  - Territories of the In/Human, Württembergischer Kunstverein, Stuttgart, Germany
- 2009
  - Gets Under the Skin, Storefront for Art and Architecture, New York
- 2008
  - House without a Door, High Desert Test Sites, California
  - Bernd Behr & Mie Olise Kjaergaard, Alexia Goethe Gallery, London
- 2007
  - House without a Door, E-raum, Cologne
  - Overtake, Lewis Glucksman Gallery, Cork, Ireland
  - Ice Trade, Chelsea Space, London
- 2006
  - House without a Door, Chisenhale Gallery, London
  - Decline and Vision, European Kunsthalle/Art Cologne, Cologne
  - Fordham, Netwerk Centre for Contemporary Art, Aalst, Belgium
- 2005
  - we live in this concrete basin, S1 Artspace, Sheffield
- 2004
  - Bernd Behr / Charles Ellis, Rachmaninoff's, London
  - Things to Come, Flaca, London
- 2003
  - Beck's Futures, Institute of Contemporary Arts, London
  - Charlie's Place, Annely Juda Fine Art, London
  - Someplace Unreachable, Ibid Projects, London
- 2002
  - We Want Out, Melbourne
  - The Way to Happiness, VTO Gallery, London
- 2001
  - Cargo Fever, Fordham Gallery, London
