= Vivien Blackett =

British artist

- Born: 1955 (age 70–71); London, England
- Education: Goldsmiths, University of London
- Known for: Painting

Vivien Blackett (born 1955) is a British artist, notable for her time as the artist-in-residence at the National Gallery in London.

== Biography ==
Blackett was born in London and from 1974 to 1978 studied Fine Art at Goldsmiths. In 1985 she had her first solo exhibition in London's Brick Lane. Throughout 1986 and 1987, Blackett was the artist-in-residence at the National Gallery in London. In 1992, works by Blackett were included in the Women's Art exhibition hosted at New Hall in Cambridge. Also in 1992, she held the position of artist-in-residence at the Camden Arts Centre in north London.

In 2007 Blackett created a body of work for a solo exhibition at the London School of Hygiene & Tropical Medicine. As well as developing themes from earlier in her career, most notably a 1997 series of painted panels entitled Above, below, within, Blackett also gained inspiration from studying archive material at the Wellcome Library on subjects as diverse as chemistry, cooking and witchcraft.

The British Council collection contains examples of her work.
