= Alan Currall =

British artist (born 1964)

Alan Currall (born 1964) is an English artist based in Scotland.

Currall was born in Stoke-on-Trent, Staffordshire, England, and grew up in Staffordshire and Ayrshire, Scotland. Currall studied at the Glasgow School of Art and since 1993 has been based in Glasgow and rural Dumfries & Galloway.

Much of Currall's work is video-based, shot cheaply with a tripod-mounted camera, and features Currall himself. Message to My Best Friend is Currall apparently praising his best friend to the skies ("You've got a great record collection. The way you dress is cool but funky."). Other video works have seen him asking his parents for their advice on how best to survive such disasters as a shipwreck, a plane crash and nuclear war, and reading his own will out loud.

In 2000, Currall produced Encyclopaedia with the support of the film and video umbrella. Encyclopaedia is a CD-ROM encyclopaedia with video clips by 'non-experts' who have influenced the artist in some way, such as his friends and family.

In 1998, Currall won the Richard Hough Bursary. In 2003, Currall was shortlisted for the Beck's Futures prize. In 2004, Currall was one of five selected artists for the Jerwood Artists Platform.
