= Toby Webster =

British art dealer

Toby Webster is a British art dealer, founder of the Modern Institute in Glasgow.

Webster studied at the Glasgow School of Art, and was an artist himself before becoming an art dealer. After graduating he served on the committee of Transmission Gallery.

In 2014, The Guardian named him in their "Movers and makers: the most powerful people in the art world".
