= David Sherry (artist) =

Northern Irish artist (born 1974)

- Born: 1974 (age 51–52); Northern Ireland
- Education: University of Ulster at Belfast; Glasgow School of Art
- Known for: Performance art Drawing; Video art
- Notable work: Stitching (2000); Avoiding Eye Contact For One Seven Day Period (1999); Carrying A Bucket of Water About for a Week (2000); Running for the Bus (1999)

David Sherry (born 1974) is a Northern Irish artist.

Born in 1974, in Northern Ireland, Sherry studied at the Glasgow School of Art. He is best known for his performance art. Stitching is a video of him stitching pieces of wood to his feet while he offers verbal instructions on how to do this. Other works include Carrying a bucket of water about for a week and Avoiding eye contact for one seven-day period, both of which consist of the activities in their titles. Sherry has said he is trying to "expose the systematic processes of day to day life".

In 2003, Sherry was shortlisted for the Beck's Futures prize.

In 2006, Sherry exhibited at WestGermany Gallery, Berlin. The exhibition was entitled 'Solid'.

In 2012, Flawedcore Records released Sherry's album of spoken word and music "I Love Those Paintings". This release triggered a curated group exhibition by Mother's Tankstation, an art gallery in Dublin.

He lives and works in Glasgow.
