= Jem Southam =

British landscape photographer and educator

Jem Southam (born 1950) is a British landscape photographer and educator. He has had solo exhibitions at Tate St Ives, the Victoria and Albert Museum, The Lowry, and the Royal West of England Academy.

Southam's work is held in the collections of the British Council; UK Government Art Collection; J. Paul Getty Museum, Los Angeles; Metropolitan Museum of Art, New York; Nelson-Atkins Museum of Art, Kansas City, Missouri; Rijksmuseum, Amsterdam; Science Museum Group, UK; Tate, UK; and the Victoria and Albert Museum, London.

== Life and work ==
Southam was born in Bristol. He studied creative photography at the London College of Printing, then worked at Arnolfini Gallery in Bristol from 1976 to 1982. He taught at Falmouth School of Art then taught photography for many years at the University of Plymouth where he is now emeritus Professor of Photography in the School of Art, Design and Architecture.

Predominantly, "Southam's subject is the rural landscape of the South West of England, where he lives and works." He conducts long-term studies of selected sites, that trace changes over seasons and even several years. His first project, in black and white, was The Floating Harbour: a Landscape History of Bristol City Docks (1977–84). All subsequent series are in colour and include Paintings of the West of Cornwall (1982–86); and The Long White Cloud, made in New Zealand at the end of 2018. He uses an 8×10 large format view camera.

== Publications ==
- The Floating Harbour – A landscape history of Bristol City Docks. Redcliff, 1982. With John Lord.
- The Red River. Manchester: Cornerhouse, 1989. With essays by D.M.Thomas, Frank Turk and Jan Ruhrmund.
- The Raft of Carrots. London: The Photographers' Gallery, 1992. With an essay by David Chandler.
- Rockfalls, Rivermouths and Ponds. Eastbourne: Towner Gallery; Maidstone: Photoworks, 2000. With essays by David Chandler, Ian Jeffrey and Jeremy Millar.
- Landscape Stories. Princeton Architectural Press/Blindspot, 2005. With essays by Andy Grundberg and Gerry Badger. ISBN 978-1568985176.
- The Painter's Pool. Nazraeli, 2007. With an essay by Chris Cook.
- Clouds Descending. Salford: Lowry, 2008 With essays by Nick Alfrey, Lindsay Brooks, David Chandler, Richard Hamblyn, Matthew Southam and Harriet Tarlo.
- Rockfalls and Ponds. La Fabrica / PHotoEspaña, 2010. With an introduction by Sergio Mah.
- The Moth. London: Mack. 2018.
- Four Winters. London: Stanley/Barker, 2022. ISBN 978-1-913288-25-9.
- The Harbour. Bristol: RRB, 2023.

== Solo exhibitions ==
- Jem Southam: From A Distance: An Industrial Landscape in Cornwall, Tate St Ives, St Ives, 2004/5
- Jem Southam: Path to a Picture, Victoria and Albert Museum, London, 2006
- Clouds Descending, The Lowry, Salford, 2010
- Jem Southam: A Bend in The River, Royal West of England Academy, Bristol, 2023

== Awards ==
- 2001: Shortlisted, Citigroup Photography Prize, London

== Collections ==
Southam's work is held in the following permanent collections:

- Metropolitan Museum of Art, New York: 1 print (as of 10 October 2022)
- British Council, UK
- Government Art Collection, UK: 4 prints (as of 10 October 2022)
- J. Paul Getty Museum, Los Angeles, California: 7 prints (as of 10 October 2022)
- Nelson-Atkins Museum of Art, Kansas City, Missouri: 2 prints (as of 11 October 2022)
- Rijksmuseum, Amsterdam
- Science Museum Group, UK: 5 prints (as of 10 October 2022)
- Tate, UK: 12 prints (as of 10 October 2022)
- Victoria and Albert Museum, London: 11 prints (as of 10 October 2022)
