= Adrian Morris (painter) =

English painter

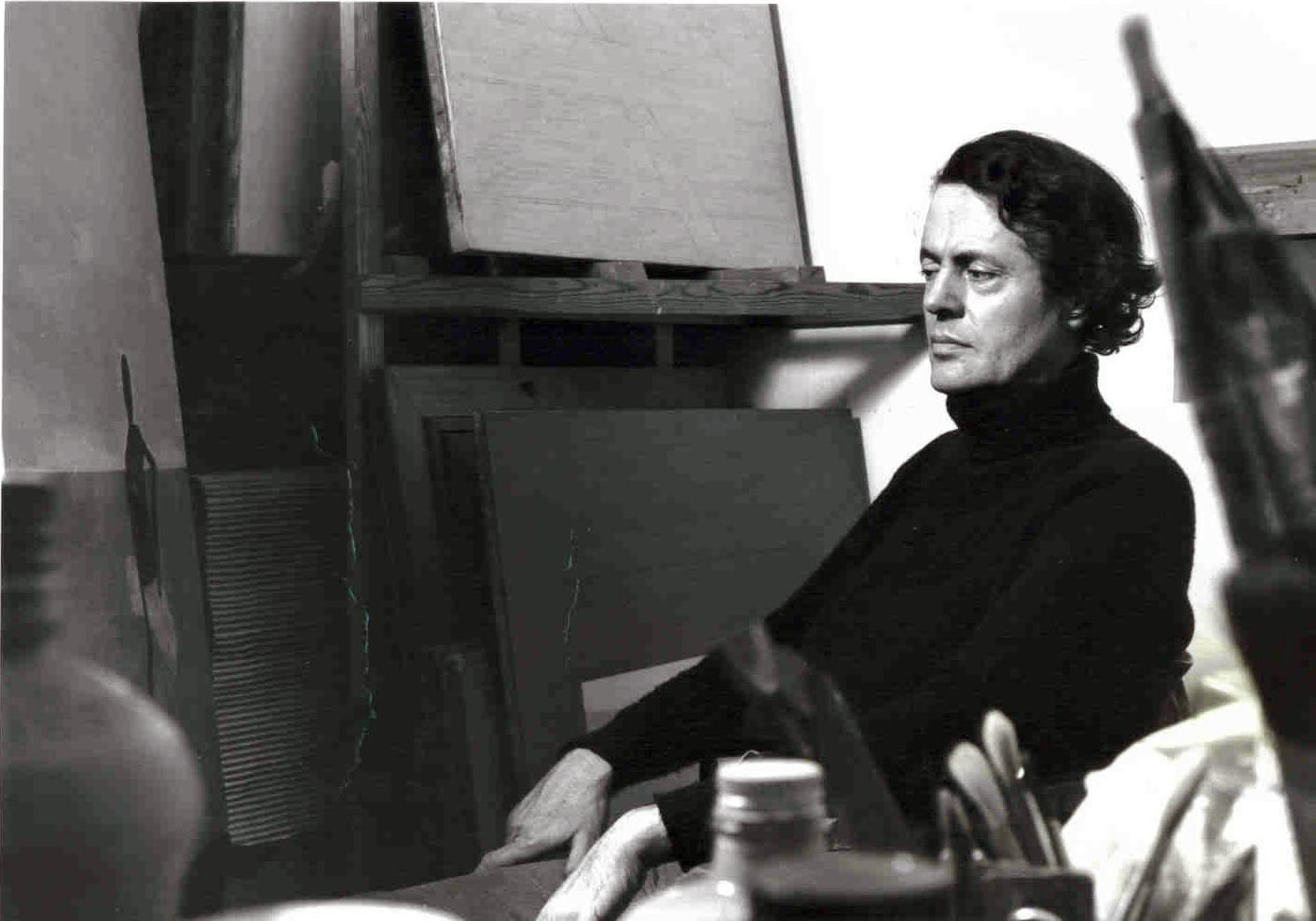
Adrian Morris

Adrian Grant Morris (18 May 1929 – 6 December 2004) was an English painter.

== Early life ==
Morris was born in London, England. He spent his childhood in rural Somerset before the family moved to the United States, where he attended the progressive Putney School in Vermont. There his precocious talent for painting, inspired by the surrealists in New York, was given full rein. On his return to the UK in 1947, after completion of National Service in the army and spells at art schools in London (Anglo-French Art Centre) and Paris (L'Académie de la Grande Chaumière), he finished his art education at the Royal Academy Schools.

== Career ==
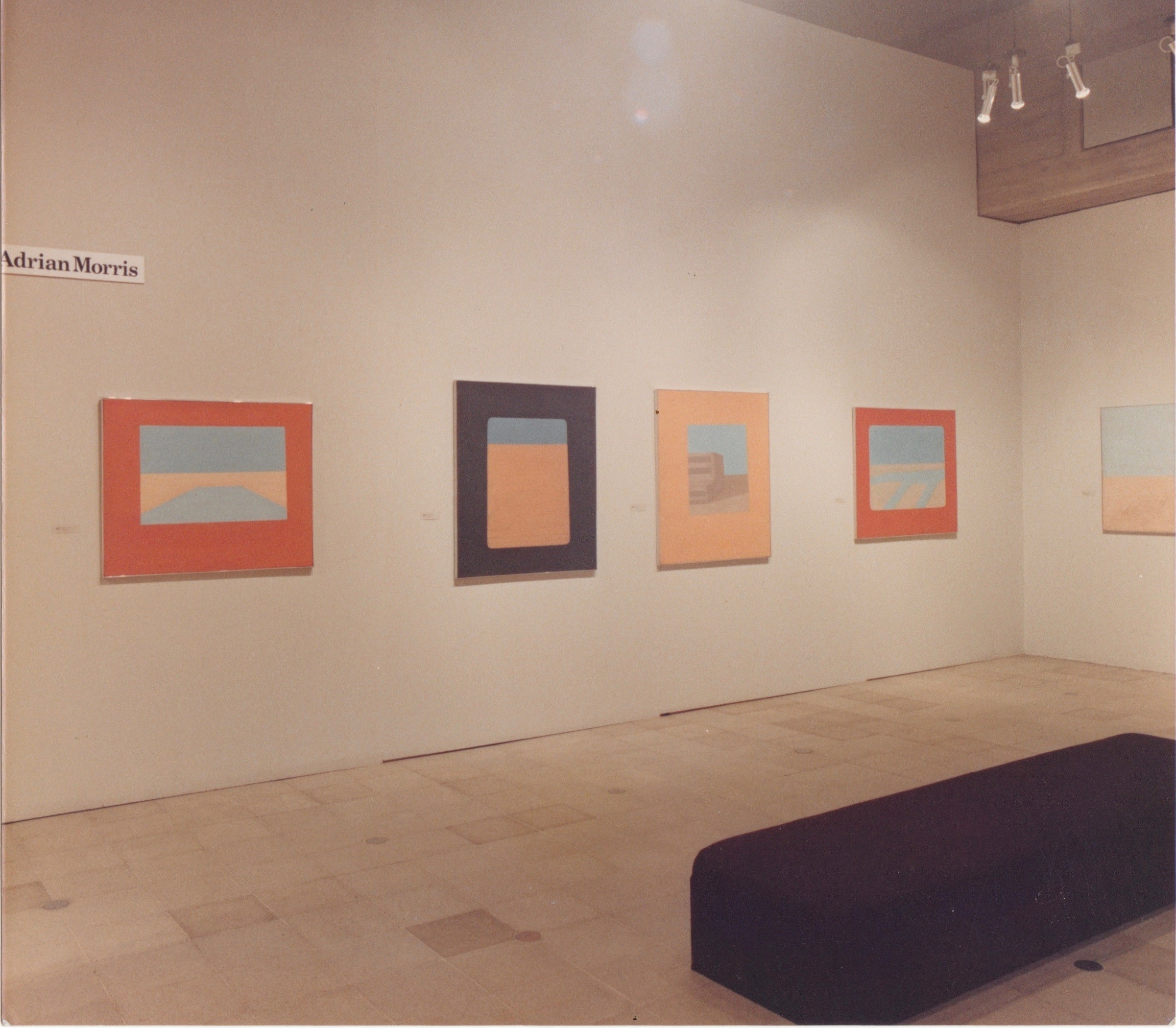
Adrian Morris's 1978 presentation in the Hayward Annual in London

Although a dedicated painter all his life, Morris was reserved in showing his work, but over the years from the mid-'50s he did exhibit at a number of leading London galleries, including the Leicester, St. George's and the Hanover. The Hayward Gallery showed sixteen of his works in their Annual '78, alongside artists including Mary Kelly, Liliane Lijn, Rita Donagh, Elisabeth Frink and Marc Camille Chaimowicz. He sketched ideas for paintings at every opportunity, especially when he was away from his studio, teaching. Dominating themes were the earth, its vulnerability to both natural and man-made disasters and the effect on its inhabitants.

Morris was inspired in the 1960s by the NASA space exploration programme and the views of distant, barren terrain seen through a spacecraft hatch. Although figures, such as astronauts, refugees, wounded soldiers and poor rural workers, feature strongly in preliminary sketches, they seldom survive into the finished works - as William Packer observed in The Times, the figures had gone "leaving a space or structure in which a figure indeed might be, but as an implicit presence". These, typically, are painted in oil on gessoed panels, which are pared down to the minimum, every square inch minutely considered.

== Selected exhibitions ==
The Redfern Gallery, London staged a retrospective of Morris’s work in May/June, 2008 and a further one-man show, focussing on his drawings, was held at the gallery in June/July, 2010. His work was included in several group shows at the Redfern, including Aspects of Landscape in 2014.

In the following years his work was rediscovered and championed by younger generations of artists. New Foundations, a one-man show of paintings was held at 42 Carlton Place, Glasgow in September/October 2015. A two-person show, with Carol Rhodes, was mounted in Balfron Tower, London in May, 2016. A solo show was held at 3236RLS Le Bourgeois, London in November/ December 2018.

In March/April 2019 a major solo exhibition of Morris was held in Galerie Neu, Berlin and his work was included in their Art Basel presentation of that year.

In March 2020 a solo exhibition of Morris’s work opened at Essex Street gallery in New York. The exhibition was closed due to the Covid19 pandemic and reopened in July for a final week.

== Website ==
The Estate of Adrian Morris created the website adrianmorris.info in July 2020.

== Critical reception ==
- "Morris's work speaks directly of the anxieties and hopes we now harbour about our planet's state in the 21st century. There is an impressive level of consistency and rigour running through his mature output. It amounts to a formidable corpus of work. The paintings' austere, hard-won and, above all precient eloquence deserves to be recognised today".
- "The images are tense and still, the paint rubbed into the gesso, layer on layer until it seems to become the material it depicts, metal and sand, amplifying the disquiet...Morris's imagery leads us to infer a somehow sacrosanct 'humanist' or 'existential' content.
- "Adrian Morris was one who understood that interesting painting must be at once concrete and mimetic, a matter of both surface and survey. His signature device of a visual aperture or hatch opening onto flat planes (plains) asserts that painting—pace formalist dogma—is always a window onto a world of illusions. Yet it also reiterates artifice, the presence of the painted panel itself. A compacted, burnished impasto fuses the frame with what is within and beyond. The terrain depicted is synonymous with the painting “ground.”
- "The paintings in their emptiness emanate light. They are pared back, unpopulated by people, with a stillness that seems to express a deep sense of geological time. They are concerned with viewing – how we view – the frailty of the earth and the vulnerability of the planet.”
