= Jim Lambie =

Scottish contemporary visual artist

James Lambie (born 1964 in Glasgow, Scotland) is a contemporary visual artist, and was shortlisted for the 2005 Turner Prize with an installation called Mental Oyster.

Jim Lambie graduated from the Glasgow School of Art (1990-1994) with an Honours Bachelor of Arts degree. He lives and works in Glasgow, and also operates as a musician and DJ. With Norman Blake, Lambie formed the Glaswegian band The Boy Hairdressers, which went on to become Teenage Fanclub.

Lambie was responsible for the filming of the now legendary 1980's 'Splash One' club in Glasgow. This rare footage has emerged on various television programmes and in films about the independent music scene in Scotland during the eighties. Most recently 'Teenage Superstars' directed by the filmmaker Grant McPhee, which surveyed bands from the alternative pop music scene in Glasgow from the mid 80's to early 90's.

== Style ==
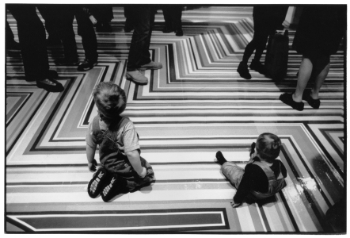
A Jim Lambie exhibition at Transmission in 1999.

“..Known for visually compelling, generous and beguiling work which attracts both popular and critical acclaim, Lambie came to prominence with Zobop, a floor-based sculptural intervention that consists of continuous lines of multi-coloured vinyl tape laid in concentric circuits of a room from its outside edges to its centre..." MutualArt article

- The Fruitmarket Gallery

Lambie specialises in colourful sculptural installations made from everyday modern materials including pop culture objects, such as posters and album covers, and household accessories. The other trademark theme in his artistic practice is using brightly coloured vinyl tape arranged into patterns around the floor of the gallery space, tracing the shape of the room to reveal the idiosyncrasies of its architecture.

According to Lambie: "For me something like Zobop, the floor piece, it is creating so many edges that they all dissolve. Is the room expanding or contracting? … Covering an object somehow evaporates the hard edge off the thing, and pulls you more towards of a dreamscape."

In addition to his floor installations, Lambie creates found object sculptures, wall works, paintings and film.
