= Beck's Futures =

Beck's Futures was a British art prize founded by London's Institute of Contemporary Arts and sponsored by Beck's beer given to contemporary artists.

Prior to the establishment of the prize in 2000, Beck's had sponsored several exhibitions of contemporary art in Britain by providing free beer. Together with Artangel, they had also commissioned a number of works by artists, including Rachel Whiteread's House and Water Tower and pieces by Douglas Gordon and Tony Oursler.

Although it does not receive as much publicity as the Turner Prize, the prize fund is larger - in 2003, it was £65,000 to the Turner Prize's £20,000. Of this, £20,000 went to the winner, who also took a share of the £40,000 divided between all the shortlisted artists. The remaining £5,000 was allocated to the Student Prize for Film and Video, with £2,000 of that going to the winner.

For the first three years of the prize a call for nominations was made to curators and critics around the UK. This proved controversial as unlike the Turner Prize artists knew they had been nominated even if they did not make the final shortlist. The open call was replaced with an anonymous nominations panel.

== Winners ==
- 2000 - Roderick Buchanan
- 2001 - Tim Stoner
- 2002 - Toby Paterson
- 2003 - Rosalind Nashashibi
- 2004 - Saskia Olde Wolbers
- 2005 - Christina Mackie
- 2006 - Matt Stokes

The 2003 prize, presented by Wim Wenders, was awarded on 29 April at the Institute of Contemporary Arts. As well as Nashashibi, the shortlisted artists were Bernd Behr, Nick Crowe, Alan Currall, Inventory, David Sherry, Lucy Skaer, Francis Upritchard and Carey Young. The panel of judges was chaired by the artist Michael Landy, and also included the curators Russell Ferguson, Maria Lind and Hans Ulrich Obrist.

The 2004 prize was awarded on 27 April to Saskia Olde Wolbers. The other shortlisted artists were Haluk Akakçe, Tonico Lemos Auad, Simon Bedwell, Ergin Çavusoglu, Andrew Cross, Susan Philipsz, Imogen Stidworthy, Hayley Tompkins and Nicoline Van Harskamp.

The 2005 prize, presented by Richard Hamilton, was awarded on 26 April to Christina Mackie. The other shortlisted artists were Lali Chetwynd, Luke Fowler, Ryan Gander, Daria Martin, and Donald Urquhart.

The 2006 prize was awarded to Matt Stokes by a panel made-up of Jake and Dinos Chapman, Martin Creed, Cornelia Parker, Yinka Shonibare and Gillian Wearing. There was also a public vote, the outcome of which was added as an extra vote in the judging panels final count. Shortlisted for the prize were Blood 'n' Feathers (Jo Robertson & Lucy Stein), Pablo Bronstein, Stefan Brüggemann, Richard Hughes, Flávia Müller Medeiros, Seb Patane, Olivia Plender, Simon Popper, Jamie Shovlin, Daniel Sinsel, Matt Stokes, Sue Tompkins, Bedwyr Williams. This was to be the Beck's sponsored prize's last year.

== See also ==
- List of European art awards
