= Christine Borland =

British artist (1965–2026)

Christine Borland FRSE
- Born: Christine Margaret Borland; 3 May 1965; Darvel, Ayrshire, Scotland
- Died: 19 July 2026 (aged 61)
- Education: University of Ulster and Glasgow School of Art
- Movement: Young British Artists

Christine Margaret Borland (3 May 1965 – 19 July 2026) was a Scottish artist. She was one of the Young British Artists (YBAs) and was short-listed for the Turner Prize in 1997 (won by Gillian Wearing) following her exhibition From Life (1994) at Tramway, Glasgow. Borland lived and worked in Kilcreggan, Argyll. She was a BALTIC Professor at the BxNU Institute of Contemporary Art.

== Background ==
Christine Margaret Borland was born in Darvel, Ayrshire, Scotland, on 3 May 1965. She studied Environmental Art at the Glasgow School of Art and later was awarded an MA from the University of Ulster in 1988. She was on the committee of Transmission Gallery, Glasgow from 1989 to 1991. In 2004, she became one of five artists awarded the prestigious Glenfiddich Artist in Residence programme. In 2012 she was appointed BALTIC Northumbria University Professor – where she headed the Institute of Contemporary Art in Newcastle upon Tyne. This is a collaborative venture between Northumbria University and the BALTIC Centre for Contemporary Art.

She was a leading member of a generation of artists who contributed to the transformation of Glasgow in the 1990s into an internationally recognised hub of contemporary arts. Across an international career, Borland was recognised for cross-disciplinary projects with other fields, such as medical science and forensics, to explore ideas related to the history of medicine, medical ethics and human genetics. She has said, "The heart of what I am trying to discuss is very dark, very strong and passionate, and if you can reach that through quite a rational process, I think it becomes more powerful, and importantly, more powerful to the viewer."

Borland was elected a Fellow of the Royal Society of Edinburgh in 2020.

Borland died on 19 July 2026, aged 61.

== Practice ==
Borland worked in the media of sculpture, printmaking and photography, and with a variety of materials including glass, china, fabric and bronze. According to the National Galleries of Scotland, she often "asked us to consider the fragility of human life and the way in which it is valued by social systems and institutions". Borland's practice highlights the depersonalisation of an individual's identity in Modern medical practices, and her work attempts to regain physicality and identity. Borland questioned how we identify scientific fact, objectivity and truth together with traditional, conventional forms of art material, such as bronze or ceramics, together with new technologies.

Her work, From Life, was nominated for the Turner Prize in 1997. She started with the skeleton of a missing person that she purchased legally from a medical supplies company and received it in the post, and then worked with medicine, forensics, judicial and police institutions to obtain information about the person. The end product was an exhibition of the skeleton, a bronze cast of the head using facial reconstruction. It was an attempt to reclaim the individual identity of the skeleton, and to turn an objective object into an understood, specific human.

In November 1996, at the Sean Kelly Gallery, she presented the work "Second Class Male, Second Class Female", in which she reconstructed the heads of two people.

LHomme Double was first exhibited in 1997. Borland asked six different academically trained artists to make a clay portrait bust of the notorious Nazi War criminal Josef Mengele, otherwise known as the Angel of Death. Borland obtained two grainy black-and-white portrait photographs and a short description of Mengele's physical appearance from Auschwitz survivors. This same information was provided to the six artists and was used to create portrait busts. According to the National Galleries of Scotland:

The portrait busts are all different, each presented on a simple wooden frame as if straight from the artist's studio. Each is made of clay and left unfired, emphasising the overall lack of certainty and finality. When seen together, the six portraits do not provide a clear, recognisable, singular identity, but a number of possibilities.

The Dead Teach the Living (1997), originally displayed at the 1997 Münster Sculpture Project in Germany, was a group of computer-reconstructed heads cast in white plaster that show different racial stereotypes.

After a True Story—Giant and Fairy Tales (1997) showed a negative impression of the skeletal remains of an 18th-century dwarf and contrasted them with a 19th-century giant. Phantom Twins (1997), consisted of leather "dolls" containing real foetal skeletons.

The Edinburgh Seven Tapestry (2024) is a triptych of tapestries, handwoven by Dovecot Studios weavers, to celebrate and commemorate the seven University of Edinburgh students who were the first women to study at any university in the UK. First displayed at V&A London, it is now permanently installed in Edinburgh University's Edinburgh Futures Institute.

== Selected exhibitions ==
- Second Class Male, Second Class Female, November 1996
- L'Homme Double, 1997, Lisson Gallery
- The Dead Teach the Living, 1997, Skulpture Projekte Münster, Münster, Germany
- Solo exhibitions include the Fabric Workshop and Museum (Philadelphia), Dundee Contemporary Arts, De Appel (Amsterdam), Fundação Serralves (Lisbon), Migros Museum für Gegenwartskunst (Zurich) and Cast From Nature, Camden Arts Centre (London).
- In 2015 she collaborated with Brody Condon on Circles of Focus, presented at CCA Glasgow.

== Selected collections ==
- Scottish National Gallery of Modern Art, Edinburgh
- Tate Gallery, London

== See also ==
- British Art
