= Camden Art Centre =

Gallery in London Borough of Camden, UK

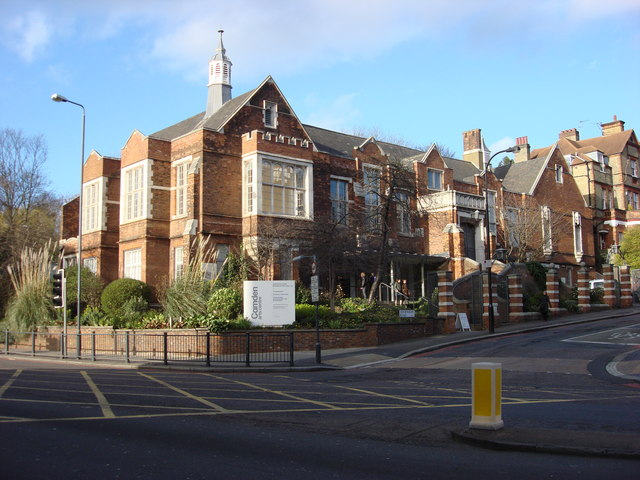
- Interactive map of the Camden Art Centre area

General information
- Location: London Borough of Camden, England
- Coordinates: 51.5512°N 0.1835°W

Design and construction
- Designations: Grade II listed building

Website
- https://www.camdenartscentre.org

Camden Art Centre (known as Hampstead Arts Centre until 1967 and Camden Arts Centre until 2020) is a contemporary art gallery in the London Borough of Camden, England. It hosts temporary exhibitions and educational outreach projects, with a programme that includes exhibitions, learning, residencies, off-site projects, artist-led activities, and courses.

== Activities ==
Exhibitions feature emerging artists, international artists, historic figures and thematic group shows. The centre also supports artists in making new artwork.

The artist residency programme aims to develop artists' practices with practical support, resulting in new work and public participation. Past residency artists include Salvatore Arancio, David Raymond Conroy, Caroline Achaintre, Jesse Wine, Phoebe Cummings, Anne Hardy, Alexandre da Cunha, Emma Hart, Veronica Ryan, Sally O'Reilly, Francis Upritchard, Jonathan Baldock, Mike Nelson, Graham Gussin, Martin Creed, Vivien Blackett, Simon Starling, Adam Chodzko, Athanasios Argianas, and Walter Price. More recently, exhibitions include Olga Balema and Elizabeth Murray.

== Management ==
Martin Clark has been the director of Camden Art Centre since 2017. Clark succeeded Jenni Lomax OBE, who was the Director of Camden Arts Centre for 27 years between 1990 and 2017. During Lomax's time as director, Camden Arts Centre established a programme of exhibitions, including solo shows by Anya Gallaccio, Tal R, Victor Grippo, Yinka Shonibare, Hanne Darboven, Kara Walker, Eva Hesse, Laura Owens, Kerry James Marshall, and Angela de la Cruz, whose first solo exhibition in the UK, entitled After, was held at Camden Arts Centre in April and May 2010. Lomax was nominated for the Turner Prize in 2010.

In 2020, Clark oversaw a re-brand of the organisation with Pentagram, dropping the 's' on 'Camden Arts Centre' to become 'Camden Art Centre'. He has continued to programme international artists' debut exhibitions in the United Kingdom, including exhibitions by Amy Sillman, Sadie Benning, Elizabeth Murray, Christodoulos Panayiotou, and Vivian Suter, as well as providing a space for emerging UK and international artists including Beatrice Gibson, Wong Ping, Julien Creuzet, and Walter Price—some of whom were supported through the Camden Art Centre Emerging Artist Prize at Frieze, which he established in 2018.

== History ==
The centre is currently located at the corner of Arkwright Road and Finchley Road, NW3 in a Grade II historically listed premises. The building was constructed as the Hampstead Central Library and designed by the architect Arnold Taylor. The building was opened in 1897 by its benefactor Sir Henry Harben, then Deputy Chairman of the Prudential Assurance Company. The Victorian structure funded by Harben survived World War II, despite hits by incendiary bombs in 1940 and the blast from a V2 rocket in 1945.

The library grew in size and was extended in the 1920s. However, by 1964, a new facility opened in Swiss Cottage which was better able to cope with the demands of the modern library service, and all stock was transferred to it.

The Centre was founded in 1965 in West Hampstead. It was originally named Hampstead Arts Centre and renamed Camden Arts Centre in 1967. It conducted community classes in painting, life drawing, pottery, printing, and basic design. The first exhibition was held a year after the Centre was established.

Jenni Lomax OBE joined Camden Art Centre in 1990 and established a programme of exhibitions, residencies, artists' projects, and public events. She led the organisation through a major building refurbishment scheme which was completed in early 2004 by Tony Fretton Architects.

In 2020, the gallery was re-branded "Camden Art Centre".
