= Dundee Contemporary Arts =

Art centre in Dundee, Scotland

Coordinates: 56.45709°N 2.974796°W

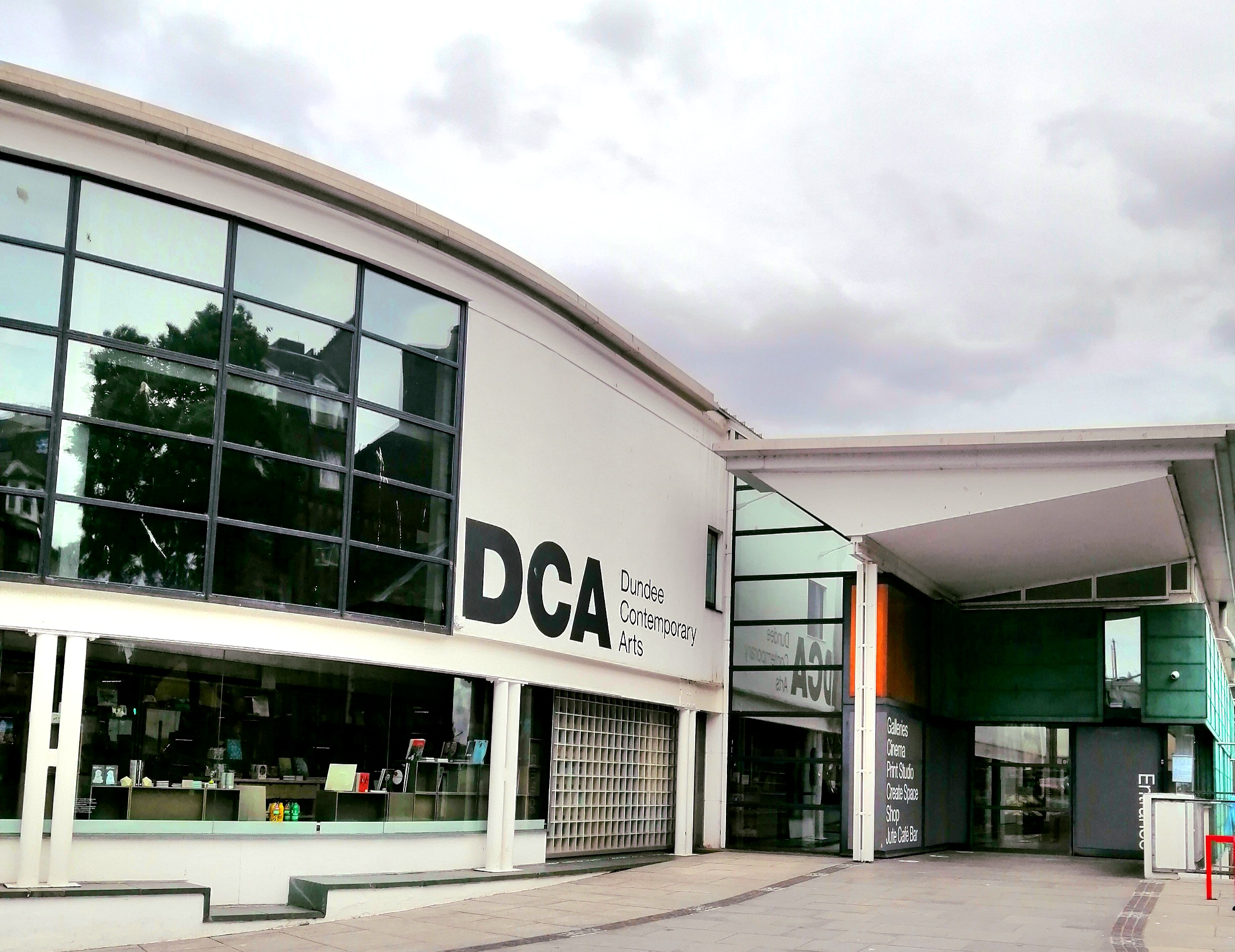

- Location within Dundee City council area
- Established: 19 March 1999
- Location: Dundee, Scotland
- Type: Contemporary arts facility
- Director: Beth Bate
- Architect: Richard Murphy Architects
- Website: dca.org.uk

Dundee Contemporary Arts (DCA) is an art centre in Dundee, Scotland, with two contemporary art galleries, a two-screen cinema, a print studio, a learning and public engagement programme, a shop and a café bar. The current director of the DCA is Beth Bate.

== History ==
The DCA opened on 19 March 1999, but the idea of establishing a visual arts centre in Dundee had been discussed by many concerned parties from the mid-1980s. In particular, there was a desire to both nurture the students and graduates of Duncan of Jordanstone College of Art & Design (now a school of the University of Dundee and one of the leading art colleges in the UK) and to build upon the work of those involved with the (now closed) Seagate Gallery and Dundee Printmakers' Workshop. Additionally, it was hoped that the project would replace and improve upon the only arthouse cinema in Dundee—the part-time Steps Theatre, which closed when DCA, with its two-screen (and full-time) cinema, opened.

Initiated by Dundee Printmakers Workshop (Chaired by Sheena Bell and Vice Chair Douglas Black), a partnership was formed between the Council, the University of Dundee and a newly formed company, Dundee Contemporary Arts, led by Sheena Bell (founding Chair), Douglas Black, Steve Grimmond, Ian Howard, John McDougall and Charles McKean. In March 1995, the Council purchased a semi-derelict garage at 152 Nethergate, favoured due to its geographical proximity to the Dundee Repertory Theatre and the University.

The subsequent international design competition to create a new building was won in July 1996 by Richard Murphy Architects. The resulting building was instantly hailed as an innovative modern space. In December 1999 the building won the supreme award of the Regeneration of Scotland Awards, ahead of Benson + Forsyth's Museum of Scotland; the judges called it "inspired and inspiring". It also received a RIBA Award and a Civic Trust Award in 2000. The final cost of the construction was £9 million. The centre currently receives approximately 380,000 visitors per year and in 2016 was listed in the Royal Incorporation of Architects in Scotland (RIAS) top 10 of Scotland's top 100 buildings of the 20th century.

In 2024, the DCA was nominated for Art Fund Museum of the Year.

== Facilities ==
- Art Gallery: presents a programme of contemporary Scottish, British and international art. Notable exhibitions include Mark Wallinger, Jane and Louise Wilson, Clare Woods, Beck's Futures prize winner Roderick Buchanan, Turner Prize winner Simon Starling, Turner Prize nominee Fiona Banner, acclaimed video artist Eija-Liisa Ahtila, and illustrator and textile designer Johanna Basford.
- Print Studio: DCA Print Studio is an open access workshop where artists of all abilities can create new work using both traditional equipment and state-of-the-art digital technology through courses, expert teaching, drop in days, residencies, collaborations and research.
- Two-Screen Cinema: DCA's cinema programme features the best in new cinematic releases and a unique programme of independent and world cinema, all selected by the DCA team. It also programmes and hosts the annual Discovery Film Festival and Dundead Horror Film Festival.
- Learning and public engagement programme: DCA connects audiences with contemporary art practice, critical writing and a wide range of "making" skills—print, film, animation, digital, photography and craft—and the pleasure and creative challenges that these activities bring.
- DCA Shop: both in the DCA Building and online, DCA Shop brings together work by talented independents alongside contemporary homeware design brands, and sells a wide range of books and magazines on art and design, plus stationery and gifts for children.
- Jute Café Bar: a popular and lively destination for visitors and Dundee residents alike, serving brunch, coffee, lunch, dinner, drinks and cocktails.
