= Mission Gallery =

Art gallery in Swansea, Wales

Coordinates: 51.6170°N 3.9368°W

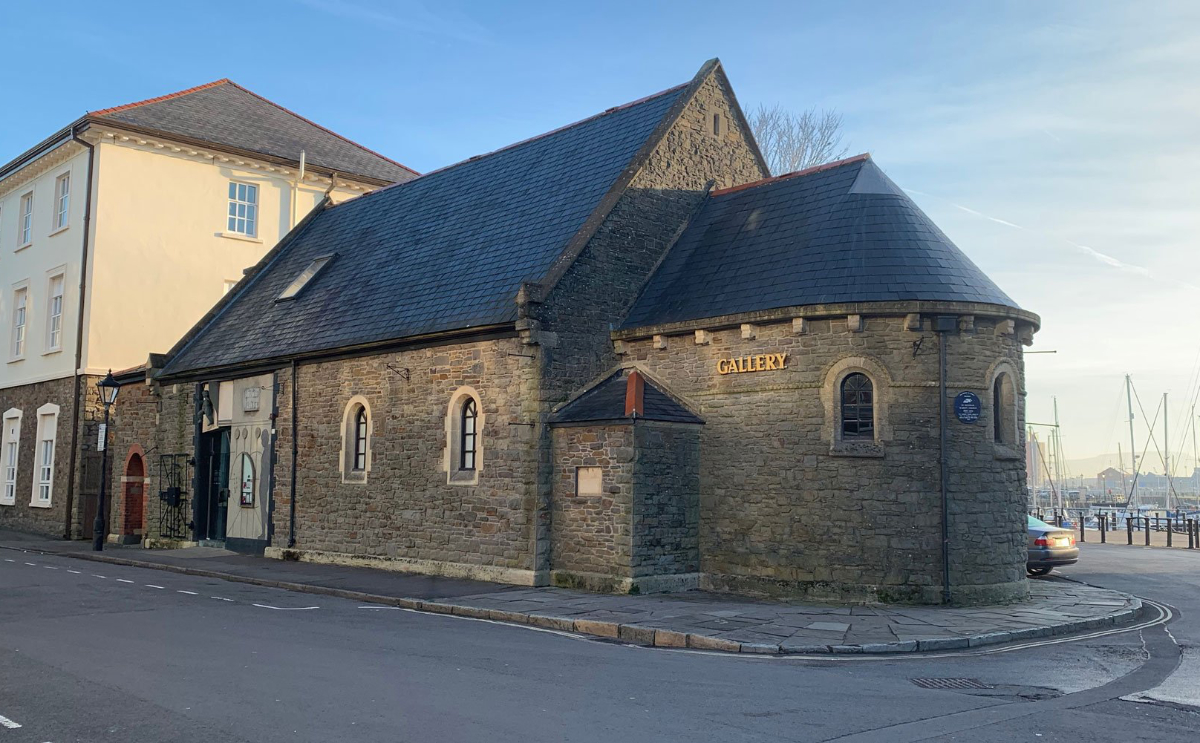
Mission Gallery, Swansea. 2019.

Mission Gallery is a contemporary visual and applied arts gallery based in Swansea.

The gallery hosts contemporary art, painting, installation, photography and craft. Formerly St Nicholas Church for seamen, Mission Gallery was designed by Benjamin Bucknall and built in 1886. The building became an art gallery in 1977, named Swansea Arts Workshop Gallery. An arts initiative, it was managed and run by a group of artists and volunteers as part of the Association of Artists and Designers in Wales, linked with Swansea Studios. Since the dissolution of the Association of Artists and Designers in Wales in 1992, Mission Gallery and Swansea Studios are now separate organisations, with Mission Gallery receiving grant funding from the Arts Council of Wales. In 2003 Mission Gallery became a revenue client of the Arts Council of Wales, resulting in its first full-time paid member of staff.

Mission Gallery is divided into three areas, an exhibition space, a shop and an education space.
