= Carol Rhodes =

British painter

- Born: Carol Mary Rhodes; 7 April 1959; Edinburgh, Scotland, United Kingdom
- Died: 4 December 2018 (aged 59); Glasgow, Scotland, United Kingdom
- Education: Glasgow School of Art
- Occupation: Artist
- Years active: 1982–2017

Carol Mary Rhodes (7 April 1959 – 4 December 2018) was a Scottish artist known for paintings and drawings of landscapes and marked by human intervention. Rhodes was born in Edinburgh, but spent her infancy and youth in Serampore, India. She moved to the UK in her mid teens and studied fine art at the Glasgow School of Art. Graduating in 1982 she became politically active around issues of disarmament, feminism and social justice. Her focus returned to painting around 1990, and she developed her distinctive idiom of aerial-view, ‘man-made’ landscapes around 1994. These began to be exhibited in the United Kingdom and internationally, and entered many public collections. Rhodes’s work, and her part-time lecturing at Glasgow School of Art, was influential for younger generations of artists. In 2013, she was diagnosed with motor neurone disease.

== Biography ==
Carol Mary Rhodes was born on 7 April 1959 in the Scottish capital of Edinburgh. She was the daughter of the medical doctor and theologian William Rhodes, and his wife Helen (née MacDonald), a former detective. Rhodes had an elder sister and a younger adopted brother. Her parents were also missionaries for the Church of Scotland and were posted to India. Rhodes lived her initial years in Nagpur, and she was later raised in Serampore, Bengal on the edge of the Ganges river, where she befriended employees of the University of Serampore, her father's place of work. In 1971, the family sent her to be educated at the Woodstock School, a missionary boarding school in the Himalayan cantonment town of Landour. There, she and her friends embraced pacifism.

Rhodes' family returned to the United Kingdom when she was 14. They settled in Sussex and later in Dumfries, for Rhodes to take her O and A-Level examinations while moving between several comprehensive schools. Although Rhodes could not adapt to the country's cold climate—she contracted hypothermia at one point— she remained while her parents returned to India though she spent her summer and Christmas holidays in Bengal. Starting in 1977, Rhodes enrolled at the Glasgow School of Art and was taught by the realist painter Alexander Moffat. She graduated with a degree in fine art in 1982, and stopped painting soon after.

After graduating Rhodes organised events at The Women's Centre Glasgow and the Transmission Gallery. She was a committee member of the Transmission Gallery from 1986 to 1988 and co-founded the Glasgow Free University with the writers Alasdair Gray and James Kelman in 1987. Furthermore, Rhodes worked as an assistant at the Third Eye Centre, and part-time as a technician at the Tramway and the Centre for Contemporary Art. During the 1980s, she took part in movements associated with radical left-wing feminism. Rhodes took part in the Reclaim the Night demonstrations, joined anti-nuclear protesters at the Greenham Common Women's Peace Camp, and protested against the introduction of nuclear submarines at HMNB Clyde.

She was keen to return to painting and in 1990, she found the opportunity when fellow painter Rowan Mace offered to share a studio room at Tramway art centre in Glasgow. Rhodes focussed on man-made landscapes composed of industrial estates, quarries, fields, power stations, reservoirs, depots, car parks and airports. In 1994, her work was on exhibition in the New Art Scotland show at the Centre for Contemporary Arts and the Aberdeen Art Gallery. Around this time, Rhodes returned to the Glasgow School of Art to take on a studio in its main building and teach. She took a Scottish Arts Council (SAC) residency in Slovenia in 1995 and exhibited in a show that toured to Zagreb as the Croatian War of Independence came to an end.

In January 1996, Rhodes was awarded a £7,500 grant from the SAC to expand her work. She began working with the Andrew Mummery Gallery in 1997 and her paintings were collected by the Tate, Arts Council England, the British Council and the Yale Center for British Art among other institutions. She exhibited increasingly widely, nationally and internationally, and in 1999 Rhodes was nominated for the Jerwood Painting Prize. A solo exhibition of Rhodes occurred the Tramway Project Room in 2000 and a mid-career prospective on the painter took place at the Scottish National Gallery of Modern Art from 2007 to 2008.

In 2012, she began to have a small weakness in one of her knees and was diagnosed with motor neurone disease at the conclusion of 2013. Rhodes began using a walking stick to help her mobility in 2014 and switched to a wheelchair in the next year. The illness ended her painting practice by late 2016 and she visited her last exhibition the following year. Her works were further exhibited at the Metropolitan Arts Centre in Belfast in 2017, and much of it was reproduced in a monograph edited by Andrew Mummery and written by Lynda Morris and Moira Jeffrey was launched in 2018. By that year, Rhodes could only communicate via an Eye Gaze Communication System. She died at her home in Glasgow on 4 December 2018.

== Personality and personal life ==
Jeffrey, in her obituary of Rhodes in The Herald, described the painter as "tall, austerely beautiful, charismatic and soft-spoken" and a person who "embodied the life of the independent artist and determined dedication to her chosen path." She had a child from a twelve-year relationship with the artist Richard Walker and lived with the writer and artist Merlin James from 2004 until her death. There were no children of the second relationship.

== Artistic style and analysis ==
Rhodes admired the work of Stefano di Giovanni, Nicolas Poussin, Jean-Baptiste-Siméon Chardin and Walter Sickert. She worked slowly, using oils, "in a very, very concentrated way", using medium-density fibreboard and plywood panels. This meant only a small number of paintings were produced each year. She used a variety of source material, including aerial photographs, travel, art and geography books. The compositions, which have been described as if "seen from a low-flying plane", were carefully planned, copied onto a painting board. Creating a slightly unsettling view, a balance "between the plausible and provocative." Journalist Morgan Falconer wrote Rhodes' works "appear to continue without end beyond the frame."

Rhodes’s work has been discussed my many critics. Tom Lubbock in The Independent wrote the viewpoint and the semi-fictional approach Rhodes employed was "the opposite of a gimmick: an idea that bestows great freedom of operation." The New York Times' Ken Johnson observed that in her works "roads cut straight or wind across the rectangle, dividing broad areas textured to resemble agricultural fields, forests, sand or bodies of water." In the Architects' Journal Rory Olcayto noted the colours used are "pale, as if drenched by the sun or washed through by rain." Patrick Elliott for The Scotsman called each painting "a carefully judged marriage of precision and ambiguity. They are not political statements, or at least not overtly so, and she spoke of them in terms of colour, brushwork and composition."
