= Off-site art exhibit =

Art exhibits are considered off-site if they are presented outside the traditional venues of museums, art galleries or other cultural institutions. This does not necessarily mean the work is uncurated, or created outside of an institutional collaboration. Artwork may be shown off-site simply because it is site-specific work. But more specifically the term implies a project that is considered too avant-garde or too unconventional to be shown in a gallery situation. According to Kermode, off-site projects are

"... by their very nature artistic gestures that have continuity with non-art environments, art that circumvents gallery space - usually detached and abstract - and goes straight to a public that often has little or no direct experience of art, thus democratizing aesthetic opportunities."

== See also ==
- Contemporary art
- Installation art
- Site-specific art
- Land art
- Conceptual art
- Performance art
