= Christina Mackie =

British artist (born 1956)

Christina Mackie (born 1956, Oxford, UK) is a British artist who works in the fields of sculpture, video, photography and drawing.

== Background ==
Mackie was born in Oxford, England, in 1956. She studied at the Vancouver School of Art graduating in 1974 before obtaining her MA in Fine Art from Central Saint Martins College of Art and Design in London in 1978. She now lives and works in London Mackie has undertaken residencies at the CCA Kitakyushu in Japan (2000), the VASL Residency in Karachi, Pakistan (2006), the Oxford-Melbourne Fellowship, UK (2010) and the XXIV CSAV–Artists Research Laboratory, Fondazione Antonio Ratti in Italy (2018).

== Exhibitions ==
Mackie's work has been exhibited at Tate Britain, Tate Liverpool, Chisenhale Gallery, London, the Institute of Contemporary Arts, London, the Henry Moore Institute, Leeds, the BALTIC Centre for Contemporary Art, the KW Institute for Contemporary Art, Berlin and the Paris Museum of Modern Art. Her works are kept in the public collections of the Tate collection, the Arts Council Collection, the British Council Collection, Nottingham Castle Museum & Art Gallery, Nottingham, UK Contemporary Art Society, UK and the Nomas Foundation, IT.

== Style ==
Mackie is well known for her multi-faceted sculptural installations, she is experimental with process and objects and likes to keep an element of change and risk in her work. Mackie is trained as a painter but uses a wide variation of styles and media in her work such as photography, sculpture, ceramics and found objects. Mackie has a kiln in her studio and did research into clay and glazes when in Australia. Mackie is interested in the interaction of the natural and man-made world and how she can represent this in her work. She uses sculptural techniques and a mix of modern and traditional media to explore these interactions and intersections to create a shifting perspective. Mackie varies in how she selects her materials, sometimes it is simply because they compliment each other, sometimes because they actively juxtapose each other. She sees each of the materials forming part of a larger statement.

== Prizes ==
In 2005, Mackie was announced the winner of Beck's Futures by the Institute of Contemporary Arts, London. In 2010, she was awarded the Paul Hamlyn Award, UK. In 2011, she was awarded the Contemporary Art Society Annual Award, UK.
