= Ross Sinclair (artist) =

Scottish visual artist, musician and writer

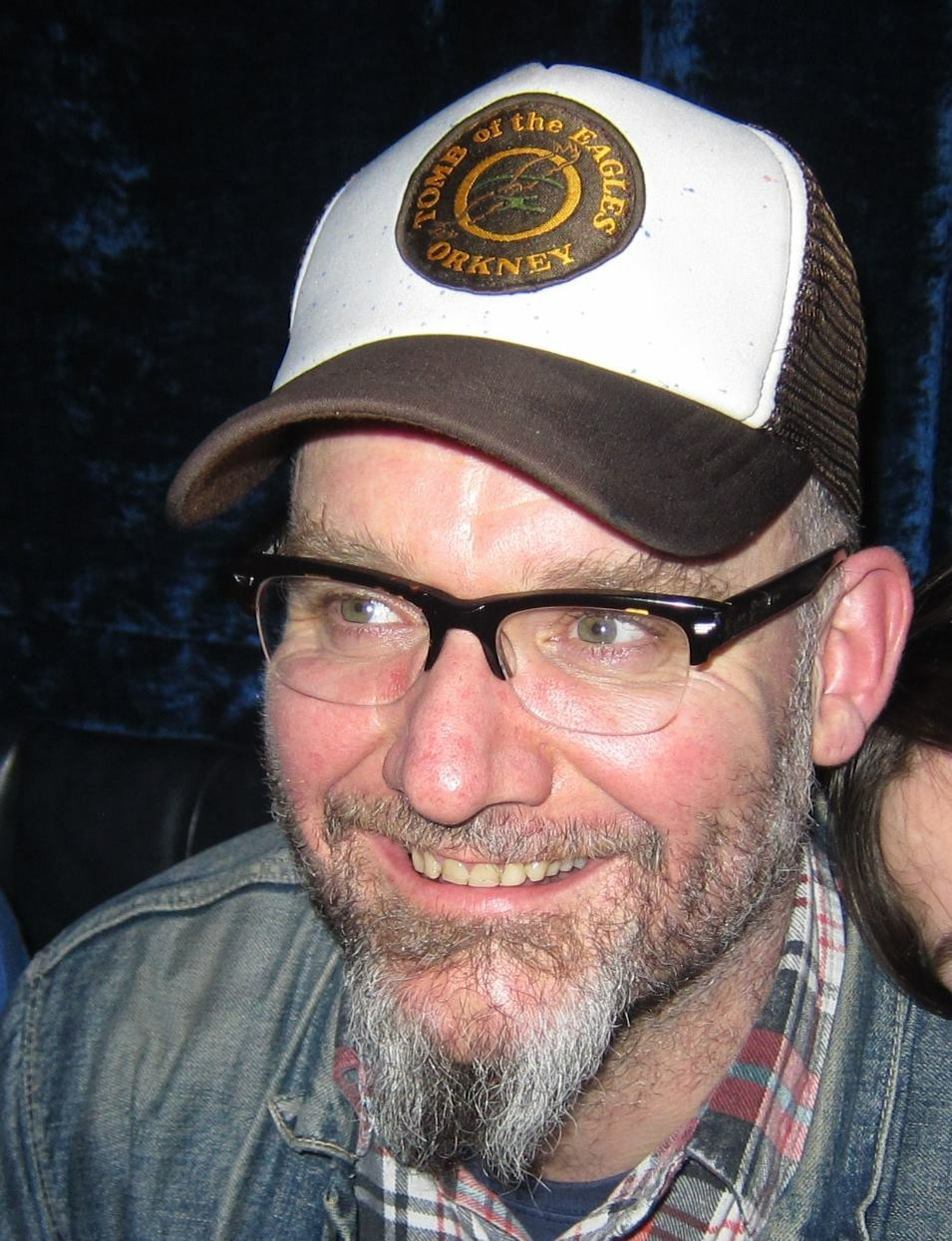
- Sinclair in 2017
- Born: 1966 (age 59–60); Glasgow, Scotland
- Website: http://rossandtherealifers.com

Professor Ross Sinclair (born 1966) is a Scottish visual artist, musician and writer. He lives and works in Kilcreggan, Argyll and is currently Reader in Contemporary Art Practice at The Glasgow School of Art, whilst also maintaining his professional practice. Sinclair was one of the key figures in the movement of contemporary artists in Glasgow in the 1990s, dubbed the 'Glasgow Miracle' by art curator and critic Hans-Ulrich Obrist.

== Early life and education ==
Ross Sinclair was born and lived in Bearsden and went to Boclair Academy before studying at the Glasgow School of Art between 1984 and 1992, gaining first a BA in Environmental Art and then a Masters in Fine Art. This study period included an exchange to the California Institute of the Arts, Los Angeles in 1992.

== Work ==
Since the late 80s Sinclair has shown work in hundreds of group and solo exhibitions in the UK and internationally, producing various monographs of his artworks, notably If North Was South and East Was West as well as writing texts and essays in many books and publications.

He often makes music in relation to his artworks and this is documented through a number of releases including Ross Sinclair: The Real Life Rock Opera Volume I (2004), Ross and the Realifers: Real Life and How to Live it in Parledonia (2013) and Real Life is Dead/Long Live Real Life (2017.)

=== Real Life ===
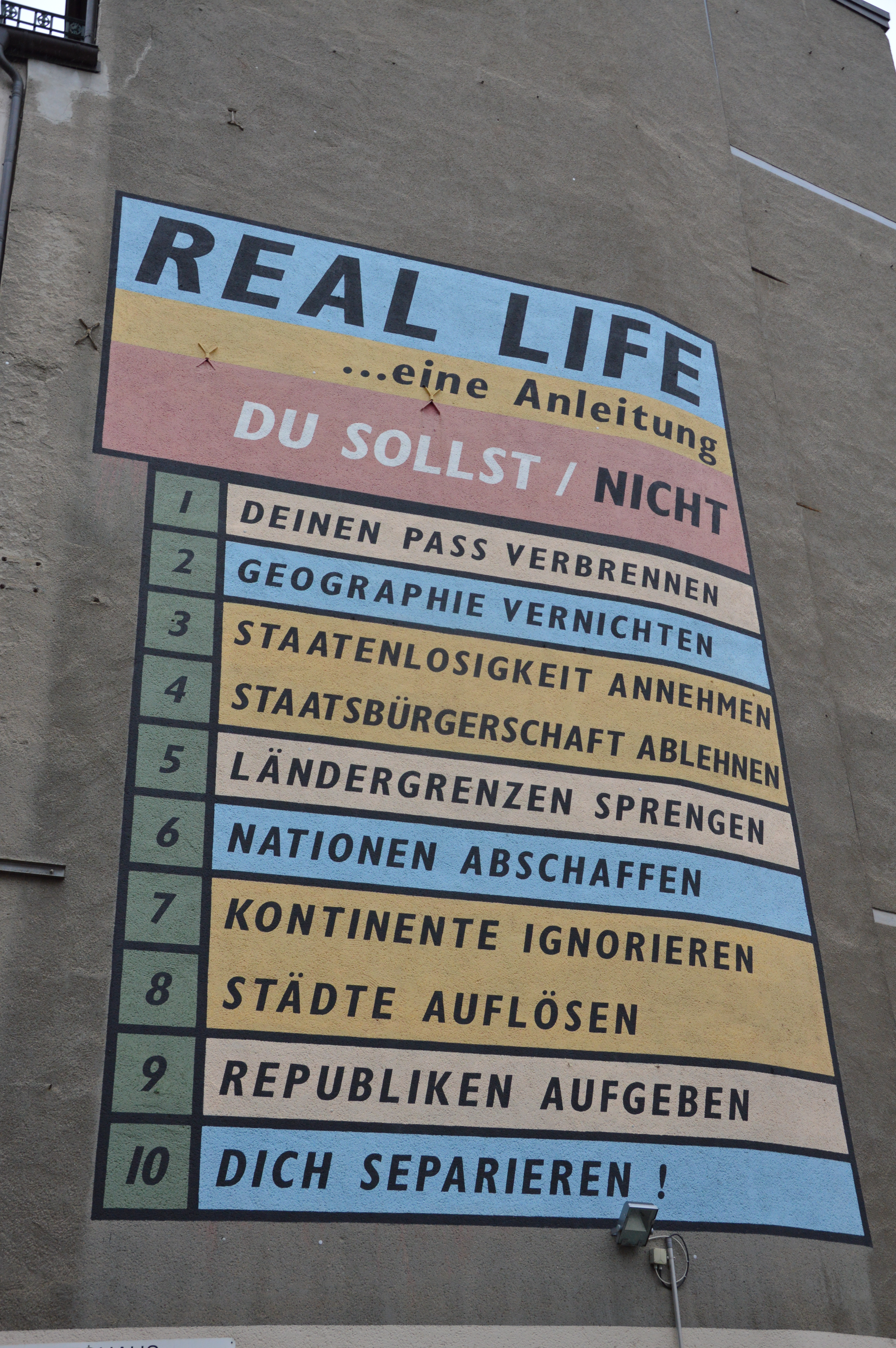
"Real Life" mural (2000) in Leipzig, Germany

Ross Sinclair is best known for his Real Life project, initiated in 1994 when he had the words 'Real Life' tattooed across his back. Since then Real Life has become a 23-year performance project, taking form in a wide range of exhibitions, public art and publication contexts. Over the two decades of the Real Life project, Sinclair's work has employed various mediums including performance, painting and music, often at the same time.

Through installation and audience participation Real Life has sought to challenge the conventional exhibition practice and connect with the public. These projects have been exhibited worldwide. Throughout the course of the project, a consistent thread of Sinclair's work has sought to address the nature of the individual, collective and national identities of Scotland.

During August 2015, Sinclair exhibited his work in 20 Years of Real Life at Edinburgh's Collective Gallery, which celebrated 20 years of his Real Life project. Sinclair worked with teenagers to create 5 bands and produce an LP titled Free Instruments for Teenagers.

=== Real Life is Dead/Long Live Real Life ===
The most recent incarnation of the Real Life project came as part of a two-week residency Ross Sinclair undertook at the Shanghai Himalayas Museum in China, ahead of his solo exhibition titled Real Life is Dead/Long Live Real Life. This exhibition served to herald a new phase of Sinclair's on-going Real Life project. For the exhibition Sinclair added the text 'Is Dead' to the 'Real Life' tattoo.

The residency focused on the consistent themes of participation, performance and collaboration, coupled with Sinclair's use of music in his art throughout his career. Sinclair worked with students at the Glasgow School of Art over a period of two years to develop and record two songs (Real Life is Dead and Long Live Real Life) which lay at the core of the exhibition. The songs were recorded in both English and Chinese.

In Shanghai, Sinclair worked with local musicians, artists and singers to create the Chinese-Scottish Real Life Orchestra – a musical dialogue between the Chinese audience and Sinclair's Real Life Project. The group came together in a collective voice, in English and Chinese, to share experiences through music. The orchestra presented a live performance at the opening reception of the Phase Three exhibition of CURRENT: Contemporary Art from Scotland, which provided the soundtrack to Sinclair's installation consisting of multiple editions of banners and videos representing the 23-years of the Real Life project. Participants were also invited to respond to the themes of Real Life is Dead/Long Live Real Life with words and pictures which were displayed on banners and placards.

== Exhibitions ==
Ross Sinclair has participated in monographic and group exhibitions worldwide. Solo shows include those at the South London Gallery in 2010, Badischer Kunstverein in 2002, Art Metropole, Toronto in 2004 and Angelika Knäpper Gallery, Stockholm in 2010. In 2014, Sinclair took part in Generation: 25 Years of Contemporary Art in Scotland at the Scottish National Gallery of Modern Art.

In 2016 Sinclair was a Visiting Fellow at St John's College, Oxford University, where he was Artist in Residence for three months. The residency encourages the artist to contribute to the artistic and cultural life of the college with the possibility to exhibit in the studio and utilise the research and staff of the college and wider university.

In 2017 Sinclair exhibited at Inverness Museum and Art Gallery, in a solo-show titled After After After The Monarch of the Glen, Real Life Is Dead. The museum commissioned a response to the iconic Edwin Henry Landseer painting The Monarch of the Glen.

Also in 2017, Sinclair undertook a 2-week residency at the Shanghai Himalayas Museum in China. This accumulated in a solo exhibition titled Real Life is Dead/Long Live Real Life. For the exhibition, Sinclair added the text 'is dead' to the ‘real life’ tattoo. The exhibition included a multi-media presentation. In Shanghai, Sinclair worked with local musicians, artists and singers to create the Chinese-Scottish Real Life Orchestra. The group came together in a collective voice, in English and Chinese, to share experiences through music.

The residency was supported by the British Council, and was one of the programmes in the Spirit of Youth campaign in 2017.

== Music ==
Ross Sinclair is a drummer and guitarist. In 1984/85 joined his first band, Gods For All Occasions, featuring Neil Menzies and Raymond McGinlay, later a member of Teenage Fanclub.

It was in 1985 that Sinclair became a founding member of The Soup Dragons. For 4 years he performed on records and played concerts including Glastonbury in 1987, and supported bands such as Primal Scream and The Jesus and Mary Chain. The group went on to perform on Top of the Pops in 1990 and sold half a million albums in the USA.

In 1989 Sinclair left the group to complete his studies at the Glasgow School of Art. He reunited with the group for six concerts in the UK in October and November 2023.

He has previously released records, Real Life Parledonia (2013) and Real Life is Dead/Long Live Real Life (2017) and CD's I Tried to Give Up Drinking With Guitars Instead of God (2013) and The Real Life Rock Opera (2004.)

== Writing and PhD ==
Ross Sinclair has written extensively. He contributed to an essay on Susan Phillipsz (the 2010 Turner Prize winner) and in 2014 to a monograph titled You Are Not Alone. His work appeared in Generation Reader: 25 Years of Contemporary Art in Scotland, which was published in 2014 to mark the exhibition of the same name.

In June 2016 Sinclair completed a PhD thesis entitled Ross Sinclair: 20 Years of Real Life and was awarded the Degree of Doctor of Philosophy by Published Work at Glasgow School of Art/Glasgow University.

== Awards and recognition ==
- 1990: Bank of Scotland Prize for Best Dissertation, Glasgow School of Art
- 1992: Glasgow Educational and Marshall Fund
- 1992: Hope Scott Trust/The Cross Trust/The Scottish International Education Fund
- 1992: Richard Ellis M.A. Prize, Glasgow School of Art
- 1993: Scottish Arts Council, Assistance Grant
- 1994: Scottish Arts Council, Amsterdam Residency '94–'95
- 1997: Scottish Arts Council, Artist Award
- 1998–2000: Paul Hamlyn Award
- 1999: Arendt Oetker Atelier Stipendium, Gelerie fur Zeitgenossische Kunst, Leipzig
- 2000: Scottish Arts Council, Artist Award
- 2001: Art Statements, Basel Art Fair, Baloise Prize
- 2004: SAC Creative Development Award
- 2007: Creative Scotland Award
- 2011: RSA Residencies for Scotland
- 2012: AHRC, The Glasgow Miracle: Materials for Alternative Histories
- 2013: Glenfiddich Spirit of Scotland, Artist of the Year Award
- 2015: GSA Research Development Fund
- 2015: Knight Award (Detroit/Glasgow project awarded to curator Cedric Tai)
- 2016: St John's College, University of Oxford, Visiting Fellow/Artist Residency Award

== Collections ==
Sinclair’s work is held in many collections, including The Scottish Arts Council, The British Council, Arts Council of England, Ferens Art Gallery, The Pier Arts Centre, Stirling District Council, Sammlung Hauser & Wirth, St Gallen, Hamburg Kunsthalle, Collection Lambert, Avignon and private collections in Switzerland, Germany, the UK, France, the USA and Hong Kong.

== Personal life ==
Sinclair lives and works in Kilcreggan with his partner, the artist Christine Borland and is employed as Professor in Contemporary Art Practice and lecturer in Sculpture and Environmental Art at the Glasgow School of Art.
