= Simon Starling =

British conceptual artist (born 1967)

- Born: 30 May 1967 (age 59); Epsom, England
- Education: Maidstone College of Art; Trent Polytechnic, Nottingham; Glasgow School of Art
- Known for: Contemporary art
- Awards: Blinky Palermo Grant (1999); Turner Prize (2005)

Simon Starling (born 30 May 1967) is an English conceptual artist who won the Turner Prize in 2005. He works across sculpture, film, photography and installation.

== Early life ==
Simon Starling was born on 30 May 1967 in Epsom, Surrey.

From 1986 to 1987, Starling studied photography and art at Maidstone College of Art. From 1987 to 1990, he studied at Trent Polytechnic, Nottingham. Then, from 1990 to 1992, he attended Glasgow School of Art.

== Career ==
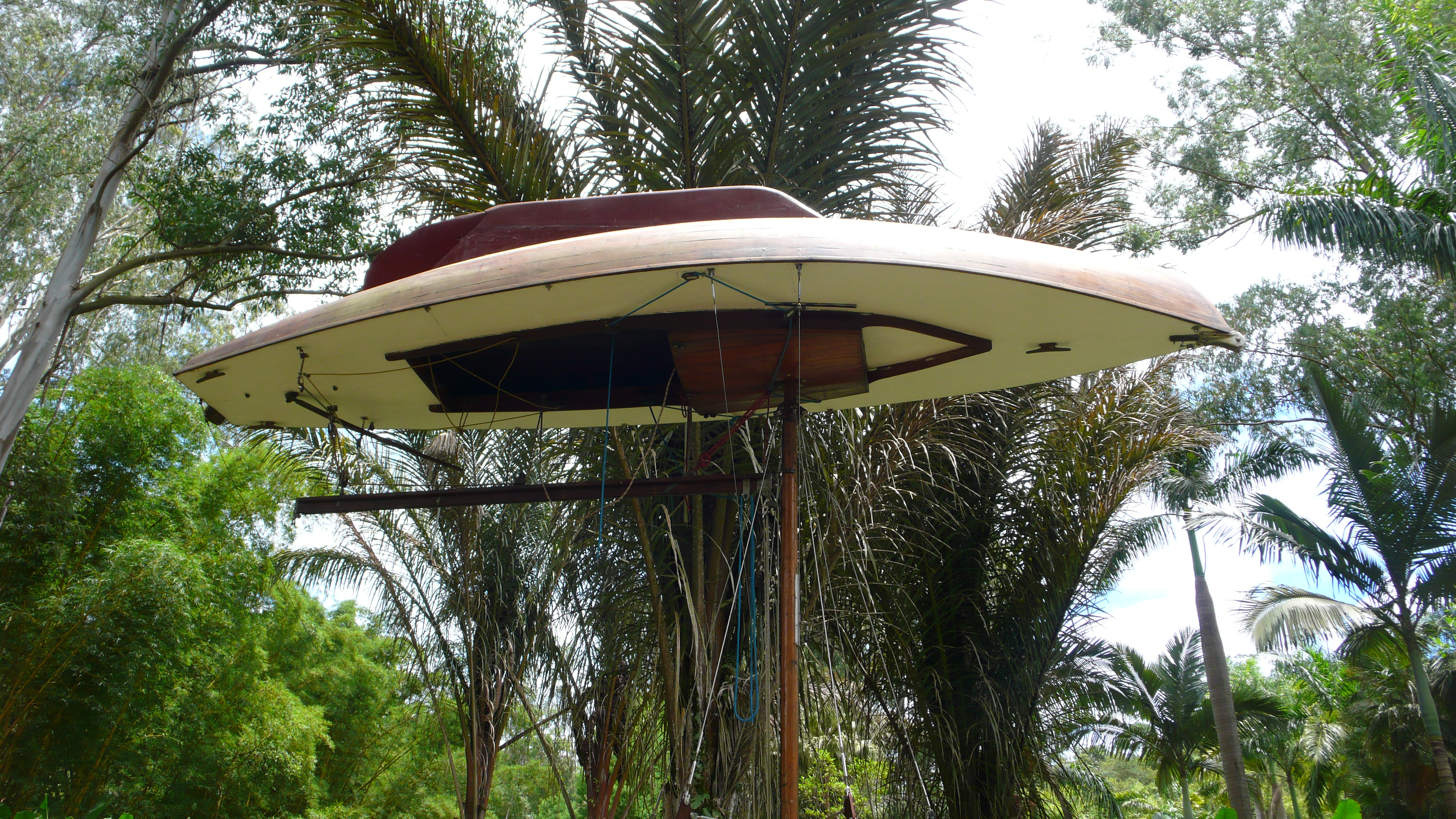
The Mahogany Pavilion (Mobile Architecture No.1), by Simon Starling, at Inhotim, Brazil.

From 1993 to 1996, Starling was a committee member of Transmission Gallery, Glasgow.

In 1999, Starling was the first recipient of the Blinky Palermo Grant.

In 2003,Starling represented Scotland at the 50th Venice Biennial.

In 2005, Starling won the Turner Prize with the work, Shedboatshed, for which he turned a wooden shed into a boat, sailed it down the Rhine and then turned it back into a shed.

Starling was a professor of art at the Städelschule in Frankfurt am Main.

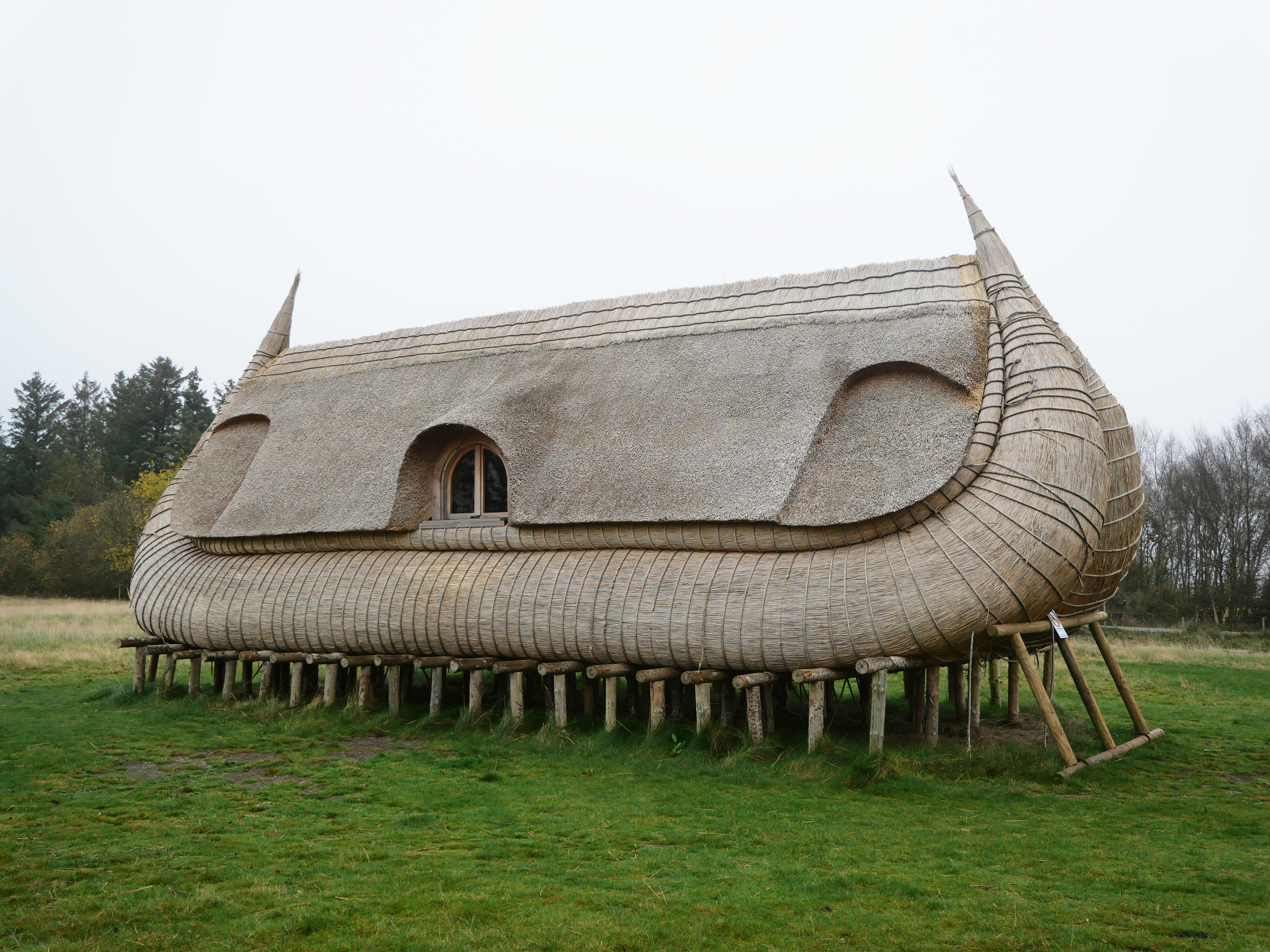
Husbåd til Ho (2023), public sculpture in Ho, Denmark. Gift of the Danish Arts Foundation and Varde Municipality.

== Awards ==
Starling has received and been shortlisted for several awards, including:

- 1999: Recipient – Blinky Palermo Grant.
- 2004: Shortlist – Hugo Boss Prize, Guggenheim.
- 2005: Winner – Turner Prize, Tate.
- 2007: Winner – Alumnus of the Year, Nottingham Trent University.

== Exhibitions ==
=== Solo ===
Year	Title	Institution	Location	Ref
1998		Moderna Museet	Stockholm	
1998		Camden Arts Centre	London	
2000		Museu Serralves	Porto	
2001		Kunstverein Hamburg	Hamburg	
2001		Vienna Secession	Vienna	
2002		Museum of Modern Art	Sydney	
2002		Portikus	Frankfurt	
2002		Hammer Museum	Los Angeles	
2005		Kunstmuseum Basel Museum für Gegenwartskunst	Basel	
2007		Städtischen Kunstmuseum zum Museum Folkwang	Essen	
2008		The Power Plant	Toronto	
2011		Tate St Ives	Cornwall	
2012		Thyssen-Bornemisza Contemporary	Vienna	
2016	Simon Starling: At Twilight	Japan Society	New York	
2025 - 2026	Simon Starling: Boat Works	Abbot Hall	Kendal	

=== Group ===
Year	Title	Institution	Location	Ref
2003	Scottish pavilion, 50th Venice Biennial		Venice	

== Collections ==
Starling's work is in several public collections, including:

- Tate Modern, London
- Moderna Museet, Stockholm
- Solomon R. Guggenheim Museum, New York
- Kröller Müller Museum, Netherlands
- San Francisco Museum of Modern Art
- Museum of Contemporary Art, Chicago
- Museum Folkwang, Essen

== Personal life ==
Starling lives and works in Copenhagen and Berlin.

== See also ==
- Turner Prize
- Conceptual art

== Bibliography ==
- Interview with Fabian Stech in ANNUAL MAGAZINE No., 2012 p. 143-146.
- Dieter Roelstraete, Francesco Manacorda, Janet Harbord, Simon Starling, Phaidon Press, London, 2012. ISBN 978 07148 6419 8
