= Jacqueline Donachie =

Scottish artist

- Born: 1969 (age 56–57); Glasgow, Scotland
- Education: Glasgow School of Art; Hunter College
- Website: Official website

Jacqueline Donachie (born 1969) is a Scottish artist who uses drawing, photography, sculpture and installation. She lives and works in Glasgow, Scotland.

== Education and early career ==
Donachie studied fine art from 1987 to 1991 at the Glasgow School of Art. She graduated from the School's Environmental Art department, which encouraged artists to place their work in a variety of public contexts outside the gallery space. She completed a Masters of Fine Art at Hunter College, New York in 1996. Donachie was one of a group of artists who helped establish Glasgow in the 1990s as one of the world's most dynamic contemporary art communities. There has been a retrospective exploring this body of work in Glasgow, which was called Generation.

== Work ==
=== Themes ===
Donachie creates socially-engaged art, often occupying public space. She explores biomedical research and ideas of communication, participation and how public spaces are designed, managed and used in her work. Books, written by Donachie, often accompany each work. She has also created unique ways to visualize public problems which can then be later discussed by those in government. One example of this was in the town of Huntly where issues about who bikes and where were in debate. Donachie's solution to visualizing the problem involved all bikers to attach chalk to their ride and then go about their business. The chalk would then record residents' progress in a visual manner throughout the town.

=== Recent and current projects ===
Speedwork is a work at House for an Art-lover in Glasgow, which has been created after Donachie spent time with running groups using the park. Tomorrow Belongs to Me was a collaboration with Darren Monckton, a professor of human genetics at the University of Glasgow. It is a research project and film installation, which examines the personal impact of illness on individuals and families and Donachie also engaged with the scientific community whose research sought to explain how such illness arose.

New Weather Coming, Donachie's work for the 2014 GENERATION festival, included three green trailer sculptures that toured Scotland and were accompanied by the handing out of a "book of Stories and Pictures" to daytrippers. The mobile sculpture in Oban was ill-received.

Donachie's exhibition Right Here Among Them, a mid-career retrospective, at The Fruitmarket Gallery in Edinburgh, 11 November 2017 – 11 February 2018, was winner of the first Freelands Award, an award from The Freelands Foundation to support the work of an under-recognised, mid career female artist.

== Publications ==
- Donachie, Jacqueline. 3532 Miles. Armpit Press (1997). ISBN 0952356562
- Donachie, Jacqueline. Tomorrow Belongs to Me. Glasgow: Hunterian Art Gallery (2006). ISBN 0904254836
- Donachie, Jacqueline. Jacqueline Donachie. Edinburgh: Fruitmarket Galleries (2017). ISBN 9781908612489
