= Laurel Ptak =

American artist and curator

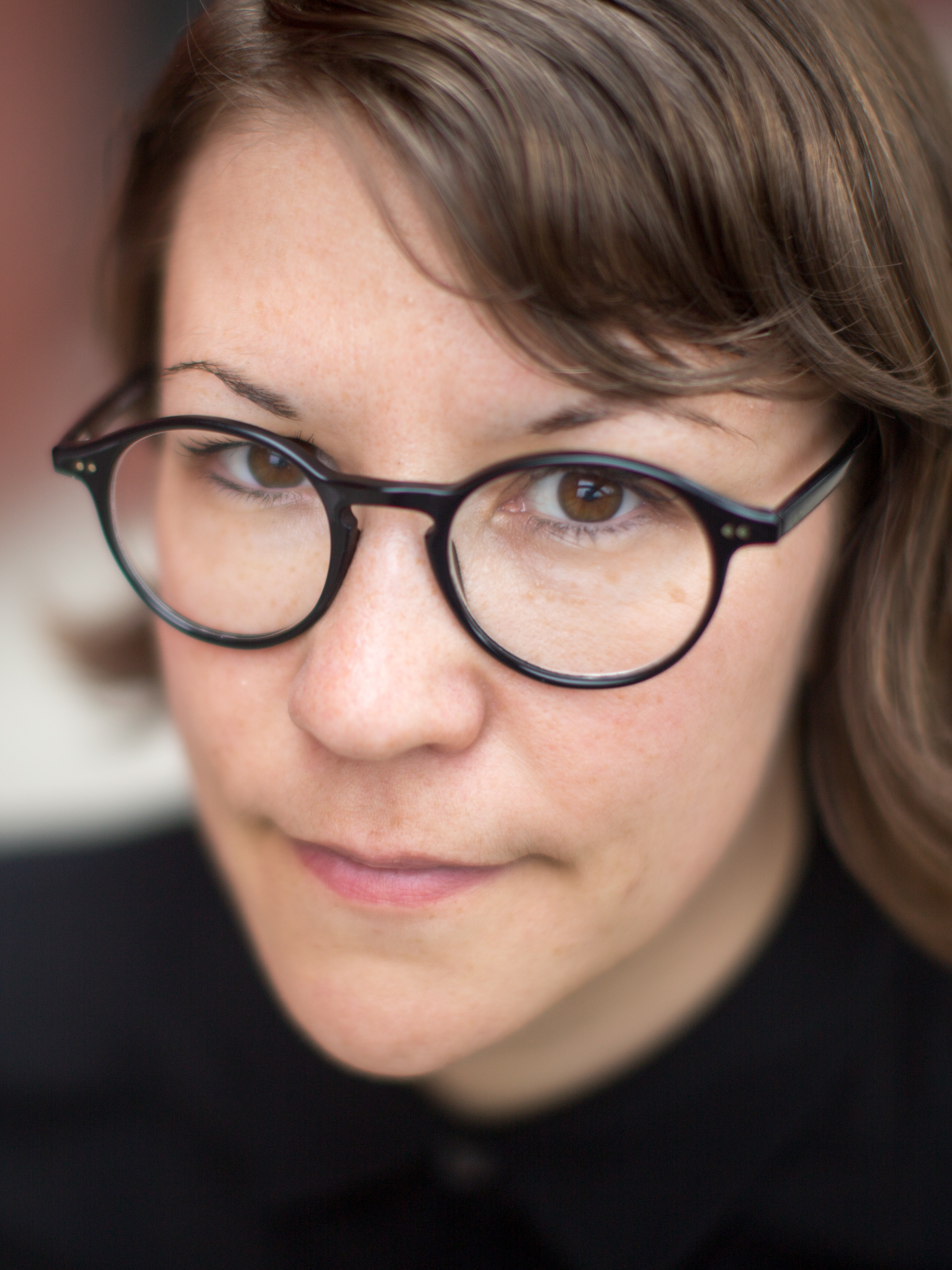
- Citizenship: US
- Occupations: Artist, curator, writer, educator

Laurel Ptak is an artist, curator, writer and educator based in New York City specialized in contemporary art.

== Education ==
Ptak studied art, critical theory and art history at Hampshire College. She received an M.A. in curating and the history of contemporary art from the Center for Curatorial Studies at Bard College where she wrote her graduate thesis on feminist art from the 1990s.

== Career ==
Ptak is curator-at-Large at Lighthouse Works, an artist residency and exhibition space located on Fishers Island, New York. She served as Director and Curator of the artist-founded nonprofit organization Art in General in New York City from 2017 to 2020 and previously led Triangle Arts Association in Brooklyn, founded by artist Anthony Caro and part of the Triangle Network, from 2013 to 2017. She has worked inside curatorial departments internationally at Tensta Konsthall in Stockholm and Museo Tamayo in Mexico City. Earlier in her career, she contributed to museum education and editorial departments at MoMA PS1 and the Guggenheim Museum.

Ptak currently serves as a faculty member in the MA Curatorial Practice graduate program at the School of Visual Arts as well as the BFA Studio Art program at New York University. She has previously taught BFA and MFA students in the School of Art, Media and Technology at The New School.

Interested in collective forms of curatorial practice, Ptak is a co-founder of the award-winning Art+Feminism which builds a community of activists committed to closing information gaps on Wikipedia in the arts, with edit-a-thons organized at the Museum of Modern Art in New York City and other art institutions, civic organizations and universities across the country. She is also a co-founder of Rethinking Residencies, a working group of artist residency programs throughout New York committed to sharing knowledge and resources while cultivating critical discourse on how to meaningfully support contemporary artists.

== Publications ==
Ptak has contributed to exhibition catalogues, monographs and books published by The New Museum, Los Angeles County Museum of Art, Sternberg Press, MIT Press, New Documents and others. Her writing on contemporary art and artists appears in journals including The Exhibitionist, Aperture Magazine, Bomb Magazine, Art Journal, Brooklyn Rail and more. She has contributed as an oral historian to the Art Spaces Archives Project.

She is co-editor of the book Undoing Property? together with artist Marysia Lewandowska, published by Sternberg Press. Its essays, interviews and artistic projects explore themes of immaterial labor, political economy and the commons and feature contributions by artists, curators and theorists including Michael Asher, Claire Pentecost, Maria Lind and Marina Vishmidt.

One of Ptak's best known projects is her text Wages For Facebook, which draws upon ideas from the 1970s international Wages for housework feminist campaign to think through contemporary relationships of capitalism, class and affective labor. When it launched as a website it immediately drew over 20,000 views and was rapidly and internationally debated via social media and the press, setting off a public conversation about worker's rights and the very nature of labor, as well as the politics of its refusal, in the digital age. She has lectured together with activist and theorist Silvia Federici, on whose original text it is based, on the project’s origins and meaning.
