= Maria Lind =

Swedish art historian, art critic and curator

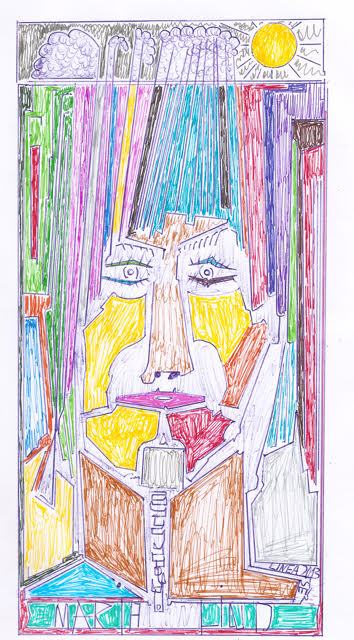
Drawing of Maria Lind by Bernd Krauss

Maria Lind is a curator, writer and educator from Stockholm. Since 2023, Lind is the director of Kin Museum of Contemporary Art in Giron/Kiruna. From 2020 to 2023, she served as the counsellor of culture at the embassy of Sweden in Moscow. Prior to that, she was the director of Stockholm’s Tensta Konsthall, the artistic director of the 11th Gwangju Biennale, the director of the graduate program at the Center for Curatorial Studies, Bard College, the director of IASPIS in Stockholm and the director of Kunstverein München, Munich.

For over three decades, Lind has developed a distinct curatorial methodology that is art centred, process oriented and context sensitive. She expresses a staunch belief in art as a form of understanding the complexity of life, on par with science, politics and religion. Known for reimagining art institutions in ways that resonate with current artistic practices and social processes, her curatorial work has been associated, in a Northern and Western European context, with "new institutionalism". She has often brought attention to lesser-known artists and practices, including social practice, collective work and research-based art, anticipating their later acknowledgement in the art field.

Lind has sought to widen the frame of art, dedicating a considerable amount of her work and writings to infrastructure, institutional methodologies, collaborative networks, conditions of production, art funding, and so on. More recently, she has insisted on the importance of placing art and artists centre stage: “I have a distinct feeling that we need to return to art itself, to focus on artworks and art projects in the wake of institutions becoming more and more obsessed with themselves, curating programmes being preoccupied with curating and curatorial students becoming stuck with in curatorial pirouettes or symbiotic collaborations. Not that art has disappeared completely, but it has been pushed into the background.”

From 2011 to 2018, Lind was Director of Tensta Konsthall, Stockholm; in 2019 she was co-curator of the third edition of the Art Encounters Biennial, Timișoara; in 2016 she was appointed artistic director for the eleventh Gwangju Bienniale, Gwangju. During the 2010s, she also held the position of Professor of Artistic Research at the Oslo Art Academy. Between 2008 and 2010 she was Director of the Graduate Program at the Center for Curatorial Studies, Bard College; from 2003 to 2005 she was the Director of IASPIS (International Artist Studio Program in Sweden), Stockholm. From 2002 to 2004 she was the Director of Kunstverein München, Munich; from 1997 to 2001 she was a curator at Moderna Museet in Stockholm; in 1998, she was co-curator of Manifesta 2, Luxembourg. In 2009, Lind received the Walter Hopps Award for Curatorial Achievement. She has been an art critic at the national dailies Svenska Dagbladet and Dagens Nyheter, in addition to writing extensively for catalogues and other publications.

== Curatorial work ==
Maria Lind's curatorial approach is highly versatile. She has challenged institutional structures, experimented with curatorial formats, and written, published, and taught extensively, working across a range of scales and contexts. From the creation of an independent art space in a shopping mall (Salon 3, together with Hans Ulrich Obrist and Rebecca Gordon Nesbitt, London, 1998–2000) to institutional leadership roles, Lind has engaged with the urgencies and specificities of place. As e-flux co-editor Brian Kuan Wood writes: “Using flexibility, duration, dislocation and displacement, and in particularly collaboration, each project is dealt with on its own terms, and the accounted for in a curated context. Indeed, while often conceived as isolated and structural solutions to problems posed in facilitating challenging work and making it public, from a curatorial perspective many of Lind's temporary and context-sensitive strategies can be considered paradigmatic in and of themselves.”

== Writing and publishing ==
Beginning with her early writing for the free entertainment newspaper City Nytt and subsequent art criticism for the national newspapers Svenska Dagbladet and Dagens Nyheter, Lind's writing developed as an integral aspect of her work as a medium to produce discourse, generate debate and attend to artworks and artists. She has co-edited numerous publications, producing translations and participating in efforts to reinstate the legacies of iconic women and feminist writers such as the Roma writer and activist Katarina Taikon (The Day I am Free: Katitzi, 2019; published in Russian in 2021) and Russian revolutionary Alexandra Kollontai (Red Love: A Reader on Alexandra Kollontai / Kollontai: A Play by Agneta Pleijel, 2020). The Greenroom: Reconsidering the Documentary and Contemporary Art (2008), Contemporary Art and Its Commercial Markets (2012) and Abstraction (2014) all address important tendencies in contemporary art, namely documentary approaches, commercialisation and abstraction. The anthology Situating the Curatorial, which she edited in 2012, takes a closer look at the notion of "the curatorial". Two volumes collect her writing: Selected Maria Lind Writing (2010) and Seven Years: The Rematerialisation of Art from 2011 to 2017 (2019). Her Konstringar: Vad gör samtidskonsten? (2021) published in Stockholm by Natur & Kultur, is an attempt at "popular education" on contemporary art in written form.

== Pedagogy ==
Education is an integral part of Lind's practice, and she has taught in various contexts since the late 1980s, from art history and fine art contexts to curatorial and writing programs. As the director of the Graduate Program at the Center for Curatorial Studies, Bard College, she reshaped the curriculum to align more closely with contemporary artistic and curatorial practices, while also teaching coursework herself. She has taught two courses at Salzburg's Summer Academy. Since 2014, she has been a guest lecturer for the CuratorLab course at Konstfack (University of Arts, Crafts and Design) in Stockholm, and for four years in the 2010s she was Professor of Artistic Research at the Oslo Art Academy. She has also co-initiated several educational initiatives, including the Gwangju Biennale Infra-School and the Art Encounters Biennial curating course in Timișoara. During her tenure at Tensta Konsthall, the institutions supported and hosted artist Ahmet Ögut's The Silent University. Lind has lectured widely across the world since the 1990s.

== Curator, Moderna Museet, Stockholm (1997–2001) ==
In 1998 at Moderna Museet, Lind initiated a series of commissions, Moderna Museet Projects, making a point scarcely explored at the time: alongside thematic and retrospective exhibitions, an art museum can engage with contemporary art in multiple and fluid ways, in sync with the artists’ needs and artistic processes. As part of the series, over four years, twenty-nine artists were commissioned to make new works for the temporary project space in an old vicarage next door to the museum, or in locations chosen by the artists. Among the artists were Koo Jeong A, Ēriks Božis, Annika Eriksson, Peter Geschwind, Tobias Rehberger, Emese Benczúr, Simon Starling, Ann Lislegaard, Jason Dodge, Douglas Gordon, Claire Barclay, Dolores Zinny & Juan Maidagan, Elin Wikström, Liesbeth Bik & Jos van der Pol, Esra Ersen and Philippe Parreno. At Moderna Museet Lind also curated What If: Art on the Verge of Architecture and Design with, among others, Dominique Gonzalez-Foerster, Jorge Pardo, Martin Boyce and Andrea Zittel. The exhibition was included in the book Show Time: The 50 Most Influential Exhibitions of Contemporary Art. Additionally, she co-curated a retrospective of Robert Smithson’s work and initiated the monthly monographic screening series Contemporary Film and Video. The latter occasioned the Swedish debut of moving image work by Jeroen de Rijke & Willem de Rooij, Pierre Huyghe, Monica Bonvicini, Matthew Buckingham, Fiona Tan, Jaki Irvine, and Deimantas Narkevicius, among others.

== Director, Kunstverein München, Munich (2002–2004) ==
During her directorship at Kunstverein München, Maria Lind and her team (Curator Sören Grammel, Assistant Curators Katarina Schlieben, Judith Schwarzbart, Tessa Praun and Julienne Lorz) privileged process, long-term Collaborations and collective thinking. A group of fifteen artists, curators and Critics (including Apolonija Šušteršič, Carey Young, Matts Leiderstam, Lynne Cooke and Jan Verwoert) acting as "Sputniks" (Fellow travellers), were invited to reimagine the role of this art institution and to work closely with it. The program also included projects by Oda Projesi, Bojan Šarčević and Chantal Akerman. Marion von Osten's research-based "project exhibition" Studio Europe was an early discussion on art and post-Fordism. Retrospectives with Christine Borland and Rirkrit Tiravanija experimented with the format of mid-career survey exhibitions. The group project Totally Motivated: A Sociocultural Manoeuvre was a playful collaboration between five curators and ten artists exploring the relationship between professional and amateur art practices.

== Director, Iaspis (International Artist Studio Program in Sweden), Stockholm (2003–2005) ==
At Iaspis, Maria Lind organised a programme of symposia and seminars engaging with research and addressing conditions of production in contemporary art and collaborative practices. These included the symposia "Taking the Matter into Common Hands: On Collaborative Practices in Contemporary Art” (co-curated with Joanna Billing and Lars Nilsson) with, among others, Anton Vidokle, Chto Delat (What Is to Be Done?) and STEALTH.unlimited; "Citizenship: Changing Conditions” with, among others, Chantal Mouffe and Stefan Jonsson; “Why Archives?”; “New Relation-alities”; “A Fiesta of Tough Choices”, co-curated with Tirdad Zolghadr; “Travelling Magazine Table”; and the seminar series “Tendencies in Time”. During her tenure, she co-edited the report European Cultural Policies 2015: A Report with Scenarios on the Future of Public Funding for Contemporary Art in Europe commissioned by the European Institute for Progressive Cultural Policies and Iaspis.

== Director, Graduate Program at the Center for Curatorial Studies, Bard College, New York (2008–2010) ==
During her directorship of the Center for Curatorial Studies, Lind sought to engage students more directly with art and artists by introducing a number of new components to the curriculum. These included studio visits, an artists’ residency program (for example, residencies with Bernd Krauss and Marysia Lewandowska), hosting/supervision at CCS exhibitions, and mediation as a part of students’ final projects. Together with artist Hito Steyerl, she initiated the research project and exhibition The Greenroom: Reconsidering the Documentary and Contemporary Art, with, among others, Yael Bartana, Haroun Farocki, Walid Raad, Omer Fast, Emily Jacir, Olivia Plender and Steven Shore. She also curated Philippe Parreno and the group show Personal Protocols and Other Preferences, with Esra Ersen, Michael Beutler and Kirstine Roeppsdorff. While her tenure coincided with a new generation of curators incubated by curatorial studies programmes, Lind acknowledged the limits to what such education can provide: “If there are three things that any education can help foster – methodology, discourse and networks – curating programmes typically offer only the latter two. They can help students acquire ways of talking about art, curating and related matters, and they allow for the formation of peer groups with whom it is possible to have valuable and long-term exchanges.”

== Director, Tensta konsthall, Stockholm (2011–2018) ==
Maria Lind's tenure at Tensta Konsthall, in the Stockholm suburb of Tensta, showed the potential of a small-scale art space situated at the "periphery". It also exemplified her deployment of a methodology that she defined in a 2009 essay as "the curatorial" – that which "emerges in the multiplicity of connections and layers, in how they are orchestrated to challenge the status quo, with the works themselves placed at the center of the project". "Consisting of signification processes and relationships between objects, people, places, ideas and so forth", the curatorial is "a presence that strives to create friction and push new ideas". Originally commissioned in 2009 by Artforum as the inaugural column in a series dedicated to curating, this essay has been influential in the field of curatorial studies and practice. Informed by Chantal Mouffe’s distinction between "politics" and "political", Lind's articulation of "the curatorial" uplifted the notion that curators and art institutions can play an active role in the public sphere.

Together with Tensta konsthall's team (including Ulrika Flink, Hedvig Wiezell, Emily Fahlén, Asrin Haidari, Paulina Sokolow, Fahyma Alnablsi, Didem Yildirim, Asha Mohammed and Hanna Nordell), Lind transformed the institution into a new model for the art institution as locally embedded and internationally connected. She describes her approach as twofold: both as a practice of “digging where we stood”, and one of developing a multifaceted programme that would be relevant for professionals as well as others—“a generous edge”. This vision operated at multiple levels. The design duo Metahaven conceived the overall visual communication infrastructure for the institution, making a "mark" instead of a logo (for use on the website, exhibition handouts, and signage). A cafeteria was established by a local nonprofit organisation as a multifunctional place for hospitality and activities for new and regular visitors (as in the weekly gatherings "Swedish with Baby", or the Women's Café). The ephemeral Tensta Museum: Reports from New Sweden, initiated in 2013, collected and presented histories and memories in relation to the location and people living and working there. Art activities dedicated to children and talks focused on children's education were recurrent as well. Numerous local collaborations were organised, including with a local women's centre, the Kurdish Association, the Tensta Library, a home for elderly people, an allotment garden and schools in the area. Art and Shops (2018) was a collaboration with shop and restaurant owners whose business were located in the mall right above the konsthall, in whose premises art was shown. Art Treasures: Grains of Gold from the Public Schools of Tensta (2018) consisted of a yearlong exhibition of artworks belonging to the municipality, and borrowed from the local schools, at the konsthall; simultaneously a series of contemporary art shows were held at the schools.

The institution's programme was multifaceted. Among its long-term inquiries were Abstract Possible: The Stockholm Synergies, 2012, with, among others, Doug Ashford, Mika Tajima, Matias Faldbakken, Wade Guyton and José Léon Cerillo; The New Model, in collaboration with Lars Bang Larsen, 2011–ongoing, with, among others, Magnus Bärtås and Ane Hjort Guttu; The Eros Effect: Art Solidarity Movements and the Struggle for Social Justice, 2015. The konsthall hosted solo exhibitions (Iman Issa, 2013; Ingela Ihrman, 2016; Leonor Antunes, 2017; Naeem Mohaiemen 2017), group shows (Soon Enough: Art in Action, 2018, with, among others, Zhou Tao, Joar Nango, Alma Heikkilä, Marie Kölbaek Iversen, Amol Patil and Anne Low), and commissioned works (Transmission from the Liberated Zones, Filipa César, 2015–2016; Red Love, Dora García, 2020; Sometimes It Was Beautiful, Christian Nyampeta, 2018; A Table Becomes a Table with Candlestick Legs, Anne Low, 2018). The institution was also home to retrospectives (Marie-Louise Ekman accompanied by Sister Corita Kent, Mladen Stilinovic and Martha Wilson, 2013; Standard Length of a Miracle, Goldin+Senneby, 2016), art walks, seminars, and screenings.

Another defining aspect of Tensta Konsthall's programme was its institutional partnerships, which included collaboration with ArkDes in Stockholm, the Austrian Frederick and Lillian Kiesler Private Foundation in Vienna (an exhibition dedicated to the transdisciplinary designer Frederick Kiesler, annotated by Celine Condorelli); Migration: Traces in an Art Collection, in partnership with Malmö Konstmuseum; co-initiation and membership of Cluster (a network of eight contemporary visual art organisations located in residential areas situated on the peripheries of cities from Europe to the Middle East); and the networks Sibling Art Centers of Stockholm and Klister, comprising small- and medium-size art institutions across Sweden. Students from CuratorLab at Konstfack (University of Arts, Crafts and Design) led by Joanna Warsza were repeatedly involved in research and public programming. The Tensta Konsthall Text Prize was initiated in 2014, highlighting young writers from the Stockholm suburbs.

== Artistic director, Eleventh Gwangju Biennial (2016) ==
As the artistic director of the eleventh edition of the Gwangju Biennial, Maria Lind conceived a wide-ranging programme together with curator Binna Choi, assistant curators Azar Mahmoudian, Margarida Mendes, Michelle Wong and the Gwangju-based art collective Mite-Ugro, invited to join the curatorial team as local curatorial associates. Entitled "The Eighth Climate (What Does Art Do?)", this edition of the biennial channelled attention to art as a guiding principle for imagining the future. Among the featured artists were Ahmet Ögut, Suki Seokyeong Kang, Christian Nyampeta, Prajakta Potnis, Emily Roysdon, Amalia Pica, David Maljkovic, Gunilla Klingberg and Adam Pendelton. Alongside an exhibition that extended from the Gwangju Biennial building to other locations in the city and online, the biennial comprised "Monthly Gatherings" (Wol-rae-hoe), conceived together with the collective Mite-Ugro; an "Infra-School" in collaboration with art schools and universities in Gwangju, Seoul and beyond; around 100 national and international "biennale fellows"; a forum with the fellows; a publication; and a website. The biennial went on for an entire year, in line with Lind's focus on long-term perspectives and embeddedness.

== Curator, Art Encounters Biennial, Timișoara (2019) ==
The third edition of the Art Encounters Biennial was curated by Maria Lind and Anca Rujoiu. As with the Gwangju Biennial, this edition proposed a methodology as a structuring device rather than a main theme. Stretching the biennial's activities to a one-year programme, multiple parts formed its whole: monthly events, the biennial exhibition, screenings, a curatorial school, an independent publishing platform and a publication. The conventional biennial exhibition monolith was disassembled into small-scale, freestanding exhibitions and interventions with abundant local connections. Among the participants were Alexandra Croitoru, Dan Acostioaei, Małgorzata Mirga-Tas, Ane Graff, Bella Rune, Pauline Boudry & Renate Lorenz, Lawrence Abu Hamdan, Agnieszka Polska, Thao Ngyuen Phan, Ana Maria Millan, Behzad Khosravi Noori and Zelimir Zilnik.

== Biography ==
Maria Lind grew up in Stockholm and Sandviken, Sweden. Her great-grandfather Albin Lind (1901–1964) was active in the labour movement, employed as a metalworker for the mine in Riddarhyttan, and later a journalist and editor with a strong focus on literature and art. He was one of the founders of the arts advocacy organisation Konstfrämjandet, and his writing and art collecting have served as inspiration for Lind. From an early age, she showed an interest in culture, with libraries and the People's House (Folkets hus) movement, with its theatres and art institutions, becoming formative influences on her life. Before finishing senior high school at Brännkyrka gymnasium, she had begun leading guided tours of the art at the museum Prins Eugens Waldemarsudde. Lind received her MA in 1990 in art history and Russian from the University of Stockholm. The same year, she was accepted as a PhD student at the Department of Art History, University of Stockholm. From 1990 to 1994, she continued her studies in the history of ideas, semiotics and feminist theory at the university; between 1995 and 1996, she participated in the Whitney Independent Study Program, New York. Her tenure on the editorial board of the Stockholm-based art journal Index (1994–1998) provided what she has called a "second university". She is the mother of Primo Gillick Lind, born in 2005.

== List of selected curatorial projects ==
- 2020–ongoing: 52proposalsforthe20s (Instagram)
- 2019–2020: Migration: Traces in an Art Collection. Co-curated with Cecilia Widenheim; at Tensta konsthall and Malmö Konstmuseum.
- 2019: Art Encounters Biennial in Timișoara. Co-curated with Anca Rujoiu.
- 2016: Eleventh Gwangju Biennial. Artistic Director, with curator Binna Choi and Assistant Curators Azar Mahmoudian, Margarida Mendes, Michelle Wong and Mite-Ugro.
- 2016: Frederick Kiesler Retrospective, Museum Angewandte Kunst, Vienna. Co-curated with Dieter Bogner and Bärbel Vischer.
- 2015: Future Light. Curator, with Rana Begum, Elena Damiani, Shezad Dawood, Mounir Farmanfarmaian, Amalia Pica, Yelena Popova, Walid Raad, Haegue Yang and others, as part of the first Vienna Biennial, Museum Angewandte Kunst and Kunsthalle Wien.
- 2011–2019: As Director of Tensta Konsthall, Stockholm. Co-curator of, among other projects, Frederick Kiesler: Visions at Work, annotated by Celine Condorelli and six student groups; The New Model, with Dave Hullfish Bailey, Magnus Bärtås, Ane Hjort Guttu, and Hito Steyerl. Curator of Tensta Museum: Reports from New Sweden; Meta and Regina: Two Magazine Sisters in Crime; The Paths to the Commons are Infinite by Ayreen Anastas & Rene Gabri; solo exhibitions with Mats Adelman, Babak Afrassiabi & Nasrin Tabatabai, Filipa Cesar, Goldin+Senneby, Ingela Ihrman, Iman Issa, Bernd Krauss, LTTR, Naeem Mohaiemen, Marion von Osten, Hinrich Sachs, Natascha Sadr Haghighian and Ylva Westerlund.
- Since 2010: Abstract Possible: The Stockholm Synergies, with Doug Ashford, Claire Barclay, Jose Leon Cerrillo, Matias Faldbakken, Goldin+Senneby, Mika Tajima and others. Exhibitions in Malmö Konsthall, 2010; Museo Tamayo, Mexico City, 2011; White Space, Zurich, 2011; Eastside Projects, Birmingham, 2012; Tensta konsthall, 2012–ongoing.
- 2008–2010: As Director, Graduate Program, Center for Curatorial Studies, Bard College. Curator of Philippe Parreno, The Greenroom: Reconsidering the Documentary and Contemporary Art, with Matthew Buckingham, Hito Steyerl, Walid Raad, Petra Bauer, Carles Guerra, Michael Rakowitz, Rosalind Nashashibi & Lucy Skaer, Emily Jacir, Omer Fast, Yael Bartana, Deimantas Narkevičius and others; Personal Protocols and Other Preferences, with Michael Beutler, Esra Ersen and Kirstine Roepstorff; I’ve Got Something in My Eye, with Bikvanderpol; Mobile Observation (Transmitting and Receiving) Station, with Lisi Raskin; Inside the White Cube: Nicholas Africano; American Soldier, with Bernd Krauss at the Goethe Institute in New York (as part of Performa 09); Wyoming Evenings: What Is the Good of Work?, series of four talks with Marion von Osten, Tom McCarthy, Michael Hardt, Liam Gillick, Gianni Vattimo and others, co-curated with Simon Critchley and co-organised with the Goethe Institute.
- 2003–2005: As Director, Iaspis (International Artist Studio Program in Sweden), Stockholm.
- Curator of exhibitions with Andrea Geyer, Ibon Aranberri, Tommy Stöckel and Saskia Holmkvist. Co-curator of the symposia Taking the Matter Into Common Hands: On Collaborative Practices in Contemporary Art, with Copenhagen Free University, Brian Holmes, Marysia Lewandowska, WHW and others; Citizenship: Changing Conditions, with Andrea Geyer, Chantal Mouffe and Stefan Jonsson; Why Archives?, with Ibon Aranerri and Roger Buergel; New Relation-alities, with Gardar Eide Einarsson, Alex Farqhuarson and Nina Möntmann; A Fiesta of Tough Choices, with Timothy Brennan, Jonathan Harris, Hito Steyerl and Tirdad Zolghadr; Travelling Magazine Table, with Karl Larsson & Andreas Mangione, Regina Möller and Georg Schöllhammer; and the seminar series “Tendencies in Time” with Matei Bejenaru, Philippe Vergne, Barbara Steiner and others. Co-editor of the report European Cultural Policies 2015: A Report with Scenarios on the Future of Public Funding for Contemporary Art in Europe, eiPCP and Iaspis.
- 2002–2004: As Director, Kunstverein München. Curator of exhibitions by Deimantas Narkevicius, Oda Projesi, Bojan Sarcevic, Chantal Akerman, Philippe Parreno and Marion von Osten, Christine Borland and Rirkrit Tiravanija; and group project Totally Motivated: A Sociocultural Manoeuvre, with Luca Frei, Carla Zaccagnini, Matias Faldbakken and others. During these years, Carey Young, Apolonija Šušteršič, Jan Verwoert, Lynne Cooke, Matts Leiderstam and others functioned as “sputniks”, fellow travellers, to the institution.
- 2002: As Commissioner, Sweden's participation in the São Paulo Biennial. Curator of solo exhibition by Annika Eriksson.
- 1997–2001: Moderna Museet Stockholm. Curator of Moderna Museet Projects, with Maria Lindberg, Koo Jeong-a, Eriks Bozis, Annika Eriksson, Peter Geschwind, Tobias Rehberger, Emese Benczur, Fanni Niemi-Junkola, Simon Starling, Apolonija Šušteršič, Miriam Bäckström, Hinirch Sachs, Matts Leiderstam, Ann Lislegaard, Jason Dodge, Douglas Gordon, Honoré d'O, Tor-Magnus Lundeby, Magnus Wallin, Claire Barclay, Dolores Zinny & Juan Maidagan, Elin Wikström, Liesbeth Bik & Jos van der Pol, Regina Möller, Markus Schinwald, Johanna Billing, Pia Rönicke, Philippe Parreno and Esra Ersen.
- 2000: Moderna Museet Stockholm. Curator of Contemporary Film and Video, with Eija-Liisa Ahtila, Ann-Sofi Sidén, Jeroen de Rijke & Willem de Rooij, Douglas Gordon, Pipilotti Rist, Elke Krystufek, Hajnal Nemeth, Peter Land, Gitte Villesen, Pierre Huyghe, Lova Hamilton, Sofie Persvik, Matthew Buckingham, Annika Larsson, Philippe Parreno, Fiona Tan, Jaki Irvine, AK Dolven, Pia Greschner, Monica Bonvicini, and Deimantas Narkevicius
- 2000: Moderna Museet Stockholm. Co-curator, Blick: New Nordic Film and Video
- 1999: Moderna Museet Stockholm. Co-curator, Carsten Höller: New World.
- 1999: Moderna Museet Stockholm. Co-curator, Robert Smithson Retrospective: Works 1955–73.
- 1999: Moderna Museet Stockholm. Curator, What If: Art on the Verge of Architecture and Design, with Liam Gillick, Dominique Gonzalez-Foerster, Philippe Parreno, Gunilla Klingberg, Jorge Pardo, Superflex, N55, Pia Rönicke and others.
- 1999: Non Stop Video Club by Apolonija Šušteršič, Mala Galerija, Ljubljana.
- 1998: Personal & Ritual, with Pipilotti Rist, Gitte Villesen, Peter Land, Alan Curral and others; at the City Museum in Skopje, as part of the Skopje Summer Festival.
- 1998–2000: Salon 3, with Rebecca Gordon Nesbitt and Hans Ulrich Obrist; in the Elephant & Castle shopping centre, London.
- 1998: As Commissioner, Sweden's participation in the São Paulo Biennial. Solo exhibition by Ann-Sofi Sidén.
- 1998: Come Closer: 90s Art from Scandinavia and Its Predecessors. Co-curated with Marie-Louise Ekman, Öyvind Fahlström, Annika von Hausswolff, Joachim Koester, Addi Köpcke, Ann Lislegaard, Bjarne Melgaard, Kjartan Slettemark and others; at Liechtensteinische Staatliche Kunstsammlung, Nikolaj Kirke Copenhagen and Ludwig Museum of Contemporary Art, Budapest.
- 1998: Marie-Louise Ekman – en retrospektiv utställning, Kulturhuset Stockholm, Malmö Konstmuseum, Sundsvalls Museum Kulturmagasinet, Gotlands Konstmuseum Visby, Bildmuseet Umeå and Borås Konstmuseum.
- 1998: Co-curator, UKS-biennalen; at various venues in Norway.
- 1998: Studio Visit, in collaboration with Annika Eriksson and Matts Leiderstam; at Duende, Rotterdam.
- 1998: Co-curator, Manifesta 2, Luxembourg.
- 1998: Swedish Mess, part of Arkipelag – Stockholm, co-curated with Sara Arrhenius; with Tobias Bernstrup, Anna-Maria Ekstrand, Lova Hamilton, Kjartan Slettemark, Johan Zetterqvist, Magnus Wallin and others; at Nordiska Museet, Stockholm.
- 1998: Press & Expose – Recent Videos from Sweden, as part of Nuit Blanche, Musee d'Art Moderne de la Ville de Paris. Travelling.
- 1997–98: Co-curator, Blind Date, a series of four artistic blind dates in Munich (Ann Lislegaard-Olaf Nicolai), Berlin (Thomas Bechinger-Nathan Coley), Malmö (Olav Westphalen-Elin Wikström) and Stockholm (Iris Häussler-Maria Lindberg).
- 1997: Letter & Event, with Rirkrit Tiravanija, Douglas Gordon, Elin Wikström, Henrik Håkansson, Carsten Höller, Christine Borland, Jaan Toomik, Gitte Villesen, Matts Leiderstam and others; at Apex Art New York.
- 1997: Clean & Sane, with Julie Roberts, Claire Barclay, Douglas Gordon, Marianna Uuttinen, Carin Ellberg, Jane Simpson, Hadrian Pigott, Jason Dodge, Ann Lislegaard and others; at Edsvik Konst och Kultur, Stockholm, and Galleri F15, Moss.
- 1996: Sawn-Off, with Dave Allen at Kulturhuset, Stockholm; Christine Borland at Galleri Enkehuset, Stockholm, Nathan Coley at Galleri Index, Stockholm; Jacqueline Donachie at Norrtälje konsthall; Douglas Gordon at Uppsala konstmuseum; and Julie Roberts at Olle Olsson Huset, Solna.
- 1996: I Am Curious; concept and coordination of a series of four exhibitions of contemporary art from Sweden in independent art spaces in London and Glasgow (Cubitt Gallery, Hales Gallery, Independent Art Space and Transmission).
- 1994–1995: 437 Self Portraits by Carin Ellberg; at, among other places, Norrköpings Konstmuseum, Malmö Konstmuseum and Konstakademien, Stockholm.
- 1993–1994: Skäggiga damen (The bearded lady), co-curated with three fellow students from the Department of Art History at Galleri Forum in Stockholm, Galleri 60 in Umeå and Göteborgs Konstmuseum in Gothenburg.

== List of Publications ==
- 2022: Curating Beyond the Mainstream, co-edited with Anna Mikaela Ekstrand Giulia Floris, Vasco Forconi, Edy Fung, Julius Lehmann, Marc Navarro, Simina Neagu, Hanna Nordell, Marja Rautaharju, Erik Sandberg, and Joanna Warsza. (Berlin and Stockholm: Sternberg Press).
- 2021: Tensta Museum: Reports from New Sweden, edited by Maria Lind (Berlin and Stockholm: Sternberg Press and Tensta konsthall).
- 2021: “Konstringar – Vad gör samtidskonsten?”, Natur & Kultur, Stockholm.
- 2020: Migration: Traces in an Art Collection, co-edited with Cecilia Widenheim (Berlin and Malmö: Sternberg Press and Malmö Art Museum).
- 2020: The New Model: An Inquiry, co-edited with Lars Bang Larsen (Berlin and Stockholm: Sternberg Press and Tensta konsthall).
- 2020: Red Love: A Reader on Alexandra Kollontai / Kollontai: A Play by Agneta Pleijel, co-edited with Michele Masucci and Joanna Warsza (Stockholm and Berlin: Konstfack, Sternberg Press, and Tensta konsthall).
- 2019: Seven Years: The Rematerialisation of Art from 2011 to 2017, columns by Maria Lind (Berlin: Sternberg Press).
- 2016: Frederick Kiesler: Life Visions, co-edited with Christoph Thun-Hohenstein, Dieter Bogner and Bärbel Vischer (Basel: Birkhäuser Verlag).
- 2015: Future Light, online reader published by Kunsthalle Wien and Museum Angewandte Kunst (MAK), Vienna.
- 2014: Art and the F Word: Reflections on the Browning of Europe, co-edited with WHW (Berlin: Sternberg Press).
- 2013: Cluster: A Dialectionary, co-edited with Binna Choi, Emily Pethick and Natasa Petresin (Berlin: Sternberg Press).
- 2013: Abstraction, Documents on Contemporary Art (London: MIT Press and Whitechapel Gallery).
- 2013: No Is Not an Answer: On the Work of Marie-Louise Ekman, co-edited with Tone Hansen (Berlin: Sternberg Press).
- 2012: Performing the Curatorial: With and Beyond Art (Berlin: Sternberg Press).
- 2012: Contemporary Art and Its Commercial Markets: A Report on Current Conditions and Future Scenarios, co-edited with Olav Velthuis (Berlin: Sternberg Press).
- 2010: Selected Maria Lind Writing, edited by Beatrice von Bismarck, Ana Paula Cohen, Liam Gillick, Brian Kuan Wood and Tirdad Zolghadr (Berlin: Sternberg Press).
- 2008: The Greenroom: Reconsidering the Documentary and Contemporary Art, co-edited with Hito Steyerl (Berlin: Sternberg Press).
- 2011: Guest editor of Paletten, no. 1, Stockholm.
- 2011–2017: Columnist, Art Review, London.
- 2008–2010, 2018–2020: Critic, Dagens Nyheter, Stockholm.
- 2010–2012: Contributor, Artforum, New York.
- 2002–2004: Publisher and editor of the Kunstverein München Drucksache (newsletter), with six issues.
- 2004: Curating with Light Luggage, co-edited with Liam Gillick (Frankfurt: Revolver Archiv für aktuelle Kunst), the result of a symposium at Kunstverein München with the same title.
- 2007: Taking the Matter into Common Hands: Collaborative Practices in Contemporary Art (London: Black Dog Publishing,); A Fiesta of Tough Choices (Oslo: Torpedo).
- Numerous catalogue texts and texts for anthologies on art, gender theory and curating, for instance: on Ann-Sofi Sidén, for the Carnegie International in Pittsburgh; Gunilla Klingberg, for Momentum Festival of Nordic Art in Moss; and Michael Beutler's Pecafil (New York: Lukas & Sternberg). One of ten curators contributing to Fresh Cream (New York: Phaidon, 2000).
- 1995–1998: Editorial board member, Index, Stockholm.
- 1993–1997: Art critic, Svenska Dagbladet, Stockholm.
