= William Easton (artist) =

William Easton is a Scottish artist, curator and writer, His performances, films and art works have been shown extensively including exhibitions at the ICA in 1984, London, Bornholm Art Museum in Denmark in 2004, Museum of Contemporary Art, Warsaw at the Ujazdów Castle in 1991, Bronx Museum of the Arts in New York in 1992, Kemper Museum of Contemporary Art in Kansas City in 2002 and at The Kitchen, in New York, in 2001.

As a curator he has presented programmes of art and design at a number of places including exhibitions at the Moderna Museet in Stockholm, Skulpturens Hus, Tensta Konsthall, The Baltic Art Centre in Visby and The Centre of Contemporary Art in Szczecin, Poland. He has been the recipient of numerous awards and grants including the Anna Louise Raymond Fellowship, William Townsend Memorial Scholarship and the Betty Park Award For Critical Writing.

Easton has been teaching in art, design, advertising, and philosophy for more than 20 years at graduate and undergraduate levels in Sweden the US, the UK, Canada and Poland. He was Rector at Berghs School of Communication 2004-2008 and until 2010 was the head of Tensta Konsthall in Stockholm.

One of his student works, "Lifeswop", involved changing places with another student for a month. He is the author of the book Play and a contributor to the work The Bio-apparatus. As well as having written several artist monographs he has published for numerous magazines internationally. He has worked as English editor for magazines such as Material in Stockholm and the international magazine Baltic Arts Mare Articum. His work “Playing Polo with Pinter” was published in the anthology Common Ground in 2007.

== Education ==
1984 First Class BFA honours degree from Slade School of Fine Art in London
1989 Merit Scholar, MFA from The School of the Chicago Art Institute
1991 The Whitney Museum Independent Study Program, New York.

== Books ==
- The Ash Wednesday Supper Galata Books, Stockholm 2025
- Shorts Galata Books, Istanbul 2016 ISBN 978-1-36-694666-9
- Johan Antonsson Changed His Name Galata Books, Istanbul 2015 ISBN 978-1-36-479071-4
- Gifts of Intimacy Tensta Konsthall, Stockholm 2011 ISBN 978-91-7437-140-6
- Gil & Moti Totally Devoted to You Editors William Easton, Gil & Moti, Hans Günter Golinski, Elisabeth Delin Hansen, Peter S. Meyer, Stella Rollig, Hatje Cantz Verlag, Berlin 2011 ISBN 978-3-7757-2847-8
- Cut My Legs off and call me shorty Tensta Konsthall, Stockholm 2009 ISBN 978-91-633-4754-2
- Polyglottolalia Tensta Konsthall, Stockholm 2009 ISBN 978-91-633-4391-9
- Business Superbrands ed. Louisa Skylderman Superbrands, Stockholm 2008 ISBN 978-1-905652-46-4
- Common Ground Around Britain With Thirty Writers Editor: Simmons, John, CYAN BOOKS 2006 ISBN 978-1-904879-93-0
- Piper Sheperd Telos Art Publishing, 2003 ISBN 1-902015-81-9
- Play, Arena, 1997 ISBN 91-7843-122-0
