= Tensta Konsthall =

Arts centre in Stockholm, Sweden

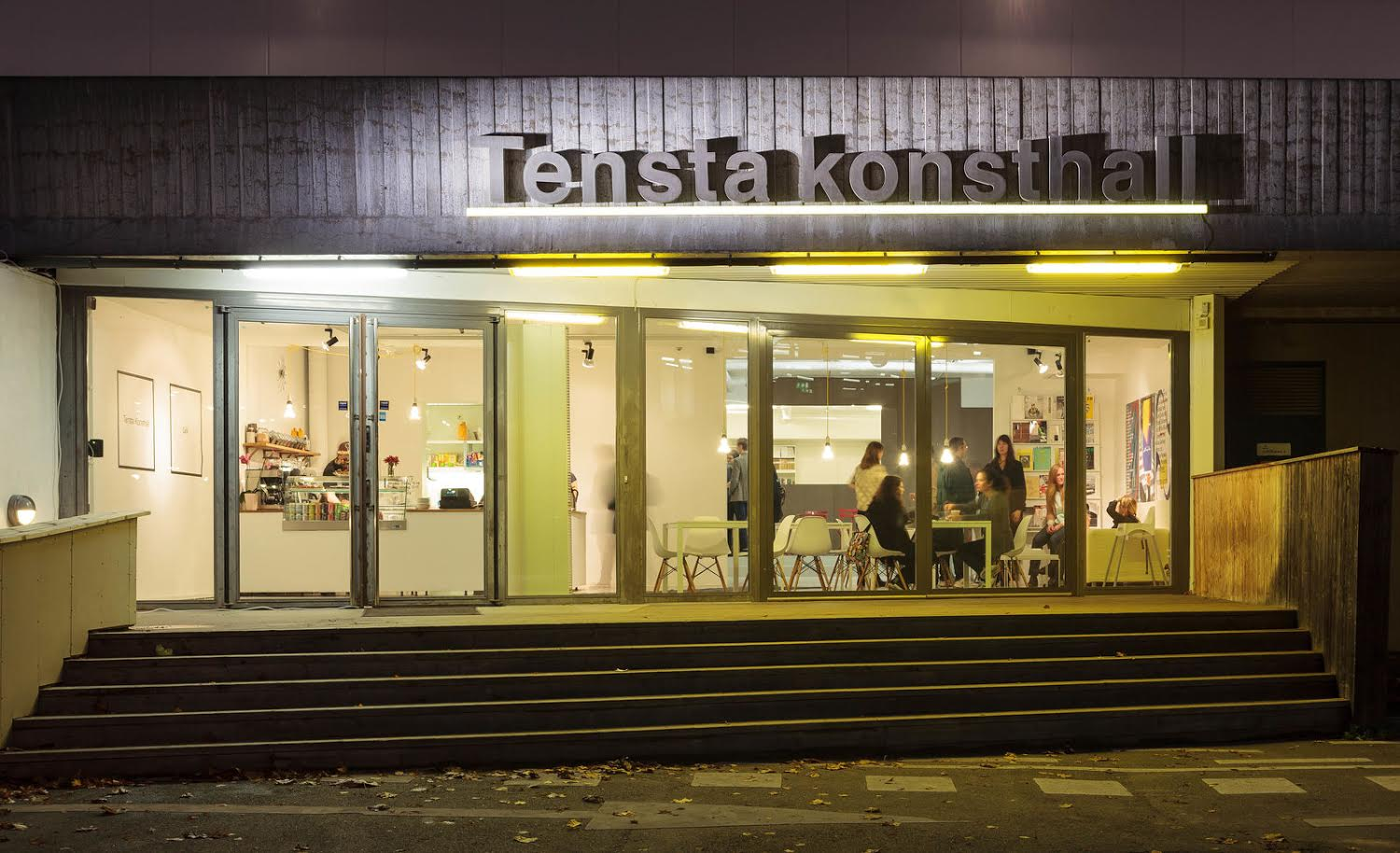
Tensta Konsthall

Tensta konsthall is a center for contemporary art in the Stockholm suburb of Tensta, northwest of the city center. The gallery works with artists from both Sweden and abroad, often in conjunction with local associations and organizations in the area. Artists who have exhibited in the gallery include Tris Vonna-Michell, Iman Issa, Shirin Neshat, International Festival, Marie-Louise Ekman, Diana Thater, and Oda Projesi.

== History ==
Tensta konsthall was inaugurated in 1998, the same year that Stockholm was the European Cultural Capital. The gallery is a result of a local grassroots initiative, which coincided with the “Outer Suburb Project,” a Stockholm municipal investment in particular suburbs. The founder of Tensta konsthall was the artist and social worker Gregor Wroblewski. As director of the gallery, he was followed by Konst 2 (Rodrigo Mallea Lira, Ylva Ogland, and Jelena Rundqvist) William Easton, Maria Lind and Cecilia Widenheim. The gallery is located at Taxingeplan, in formerly unused storage space underneath Tensta Shopping Mall, and encompasses about 700 m².

=== Tensta – The area, population and architecture ===
Tensta lies 20 minutes by underground from the Stockholm Central Station and is dominated by a large housing area that was built in 1967-72. Tensta is the largest single housing area in the so-called Million Dwellings Programme (1965–74). In Tensta, some 6,000 flats share space with Iron Age graves, rune stones, one of the Stockholm region's oldest churches, a former military training ground from the early 20th century, and the nature reserve, Järvafältet (Järva Field). Tensta has a population of around 19,000 people, of whom nearly 90 percent have immigrant backgrounds. Statistically, the average income in Tensta is lower and unemployment higher than in the rest of Sweden, and it is one of the most segregated cities not only in Sweden but also in the whole of Europe.

==== Economy ====
In 2012, the annual budget of Tensta konsthall was 8.8 million Swedish kronor, which represents an increase of about 3 million from the previous year. It has been a private foundation since 2000, financed primarily by the municipality of Stockholm and the Swedish state via the Swedish Arts Council. At present, financial support from the municipality and state constitutes around 50-60 percent of the gallery's proceeds; the remainder comes from other sources. The gallery's visitors come from near and far, and in 2012 they numbered more than 20,000. The gallery has free admission.

===== Tensta konsthall today =====
Since 2011, Tensta konsthall has been actively working towards participating in an international exchange concerning definitions of contemporary art. The gallery's program is formed and directed by art and artists, with the aim of mediating their activities in a way that can be meaningful and relevant in Tensta itself. This has involved, among other things, opening a café run by a local company, Xpandia Vision, in an area lacking any similar sort of café. The gallery café has also become a venue for Tea and Coffee gatherings, organized together with the Women's Centre of Tensta-Hjulsta. The gallery also cooperates with local organizations such as the Ross Tensta Upper Secondary School, the women's group, Livstycket, the library, and the Kurdish Association. Particular focus is directed towards contacts with women of different ages.

===== Exhibitions and other projects 2011 - 2014 =====
Tensta konsthall has been following three different lines of inquiry since 2013. The first concerns questions of articulation – how something is shaped and organized. The second involves art and money and the third relates to the working conditions of artists and other cultural producers. Another line is directed towards archives, libraries, and collections. Art camps, organized during school holidays, offer different kinds of art education and are led by artists. The five-part seminar series “What does an art institution do?” (2011-2012) was the result of collaboration between the gallery and the University College of Arts Crafts and Design. This has been followed up by new seminar series, formulated by questions such as “What does social practice do?” and “What does art theory do?”

Recent exhibitions at Tensta konsthall include • “Abstract Possible: The Stockholm Synergies,” with Doug Ashford, Claire Barclay, Goldin+Senneby, Wade Guyton, Mai-Thu Perret, Walid Raad, and Haegue Yang, among others • “Kami, Khokha, Bert and Ernie: World Heritage” by Hinrich Sachs • “Doing what you want: Marie-Louise Ekman accompanied by Sister Corita Kent, Mladen Stilinović, and Martha Wilson” • “The Society without qualities” with Sören Andreasen, Ane Hjort Guttu, Sture Johannesson, Sharon Lockhardt, and Palle Nielsen (part of “The new model” and curated by Lars Bang Larsen) • “Working With...” by Zak Kyes • “We are continuing BBDG” with Bernd Krauss • “Two Archives” by Babak Afrassiabi and Nasrin Tabatabai

Other projects at the gallery include “The Bidoun Library,” “Katitzi: A literary figure with roots in reality,” and the one-day performance, “T.451” by Dominique Gonzalez-Foerster and Ari Benjamin Meyers. Contemporary Art and Its Commercial Markets: Reports on Current Conditions and Future Scenarios; No Is Not An Answer: On the Work of Marie-Louise Ekman and Undoing Property? (edited by Marysia Lewandowska and Laurel Ptak) are recent publications, published by Tensta konsthall together with Sternberg Press, Berlin.

Tensta konsthall collaborates with the network Cluster, which is composed of eight European art organizations (and one in Holon, Israel), each situated on the outskirts of large cities. Common to all these organisations is that they actively participate in their local communities.

Inspired by Cluster, the network Klister (Glue) was started in 2012 for small and mid-sized institutions of contemporary art in Sweden. Klister aims to highlight the role of smaller contemporary institutions in society, institutions which today comprise experimental and discursive platforms of ever increasing importance. Among the members of Klister are Marabouparken in Sundbyberg, Botkyrka Konsthall, Borås Konstmuseum, Gävle Konstcentrum, Skövde Kulturhus, and Röda sten in Gothenburg. By cooperating with the Swedish Exhibition Agency, Klister has been able to generate resources and commission a report on conditions for its members, which is to be published in the spring of 2014.

Tensta konsthall's present spatial disposition is based on proposals from the architect Nikolaus Hirsch. The café has been designed in collaboration with the architect Filippa Stålhane. Another space for the gallery was created in 2012 through the section “space” at the design collective Metahaven's website and developed in cooperation with the curator, Laurel Ptak. Metahaven is responsible for the overall communication strategy, including the use of the malleable “label” instead of a logotype.
