= Anna Mikaela Ekstrand =

Swedish art curator

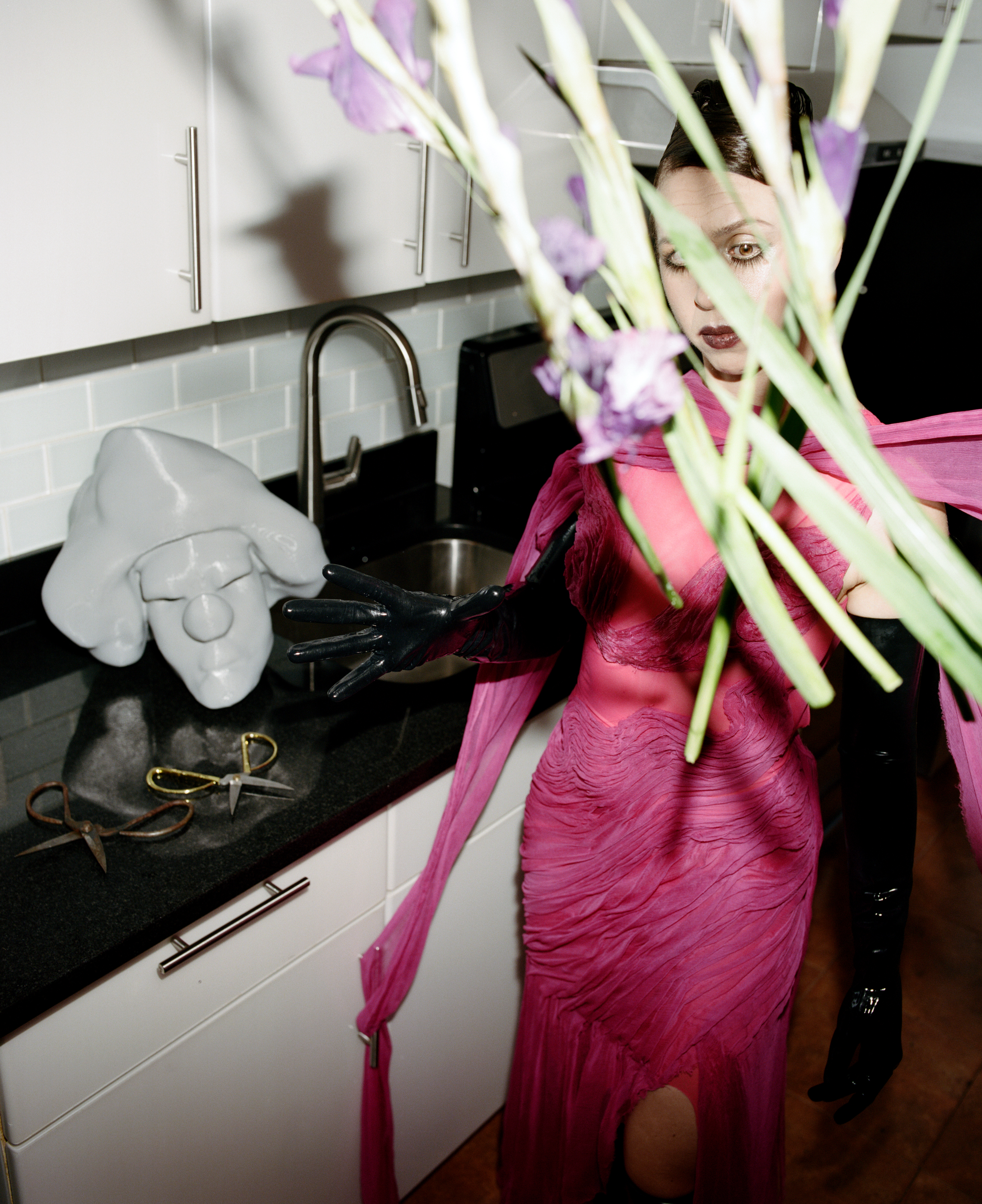
- Anna Mikaela Ekstrand with 'Bad Woman' mask by Katya Grokhovsky. Photo: Elsa Hammarén
- Education: Stockholm University; Bard Graduate Center

Anna Mikaela Ekstrand is a Swedish art curator.

== Biography ==
In 2014, she founded the English-language online magazine Cultbytes, which focuses on arts and culture, and serves as its editor-in-chief and publisher.

Together with Bianca-Abdi Boragi and Katherine Adams, she curated "Contact Zone," the 2nd edition of The Immigrant Artist Biennial in New York and New Jersey, featuring 55 artists between 2023 and 2024. In connection with the biennal, she also worked with Fotografiska in New York. Since 2023, she is the deputy director of The Immigrant Artist Biennial.

Ekstrand curated the exhibition "Gunilla Lundahl: Social Justice, Freedom, and Beauty" with artistic direction by Sanna Fried at ArkDes 2023. The exhibition was connected to the book Curating beyond the mainstream which she edited together with Maria Lind and several other curators.

Ekstrand has curated exhibitions at museums and galleries in Stockholm, Vienna, and New York with several feminist artists.

== Bibliography ==
- (co-editor) Assuming Asymmetries: Conversations on Curating Public Art Projects of the 1980s and 1990s. Berlin: Sternberg Press, 2022. ISBN 978-3-95679-612-8
- (co-editor) Curating Beyond the Mainstream: The Practices of Carlos Capelán, Elisabet Haglund, Gunilla Lundahl, and Jan-Erik Lundström. Berlin: Sternberg Press, 2022. ISBN 978-3-95679-613-5
- “How Panoply Performance Lab Has Supported Me and How You Can Support the Performance Art Community” in Institution is a Verb: A Panoply Performance Lab Compilation. Brooklyn: The Operating System, 2022. ISBN 978-3-95679-613-5
- (editor) Field Guide: The Immigrant Artist Biennial 2023: Contact Zone. New York, 2023. (downloadable via The Immigrant Artist Biennial website https://www.theimmigrantartistbiennial.com/s/TIAB-Field-Guide-Part-I.pdf)
