= Tensta =

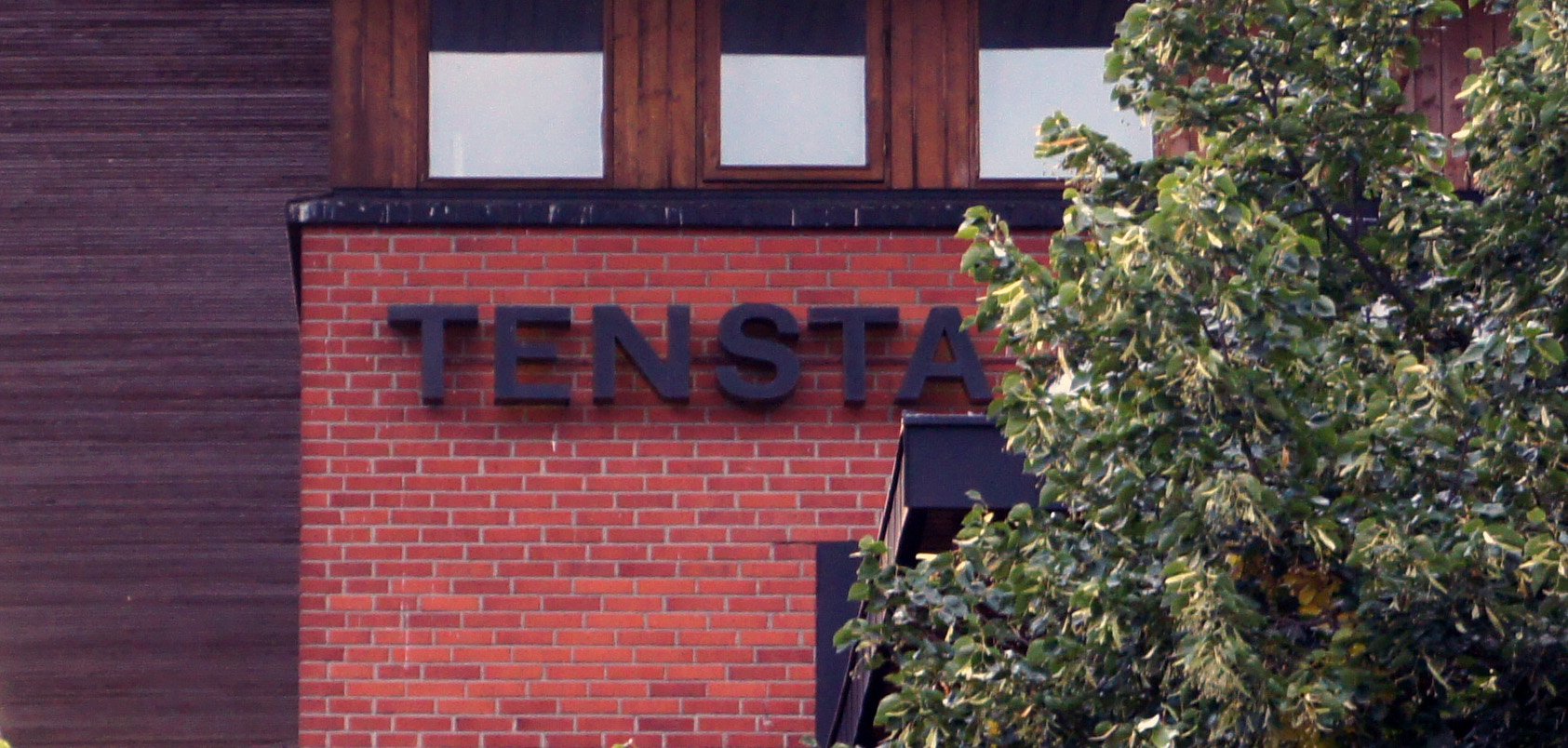
- Building in the Tensta Centrum

- Location within Sweden
- Coordinates: 59°23′40″N 17°54′05″E
- Country: Sweden
- Province: Stockholm
- County: Stockholm County
- Municipality: Stockholm Municipality

Area
  - Total: 2.34 km^{2} (0.90 sq mi)

Population (December 31 2023)
  - Total: 18,599
  - Density: 7,300.43/km^{2} (18,908.0/sq mi)
- Time zone: UTC+1 (CET)
  - Summer (DST): UTC+2 (CEST)

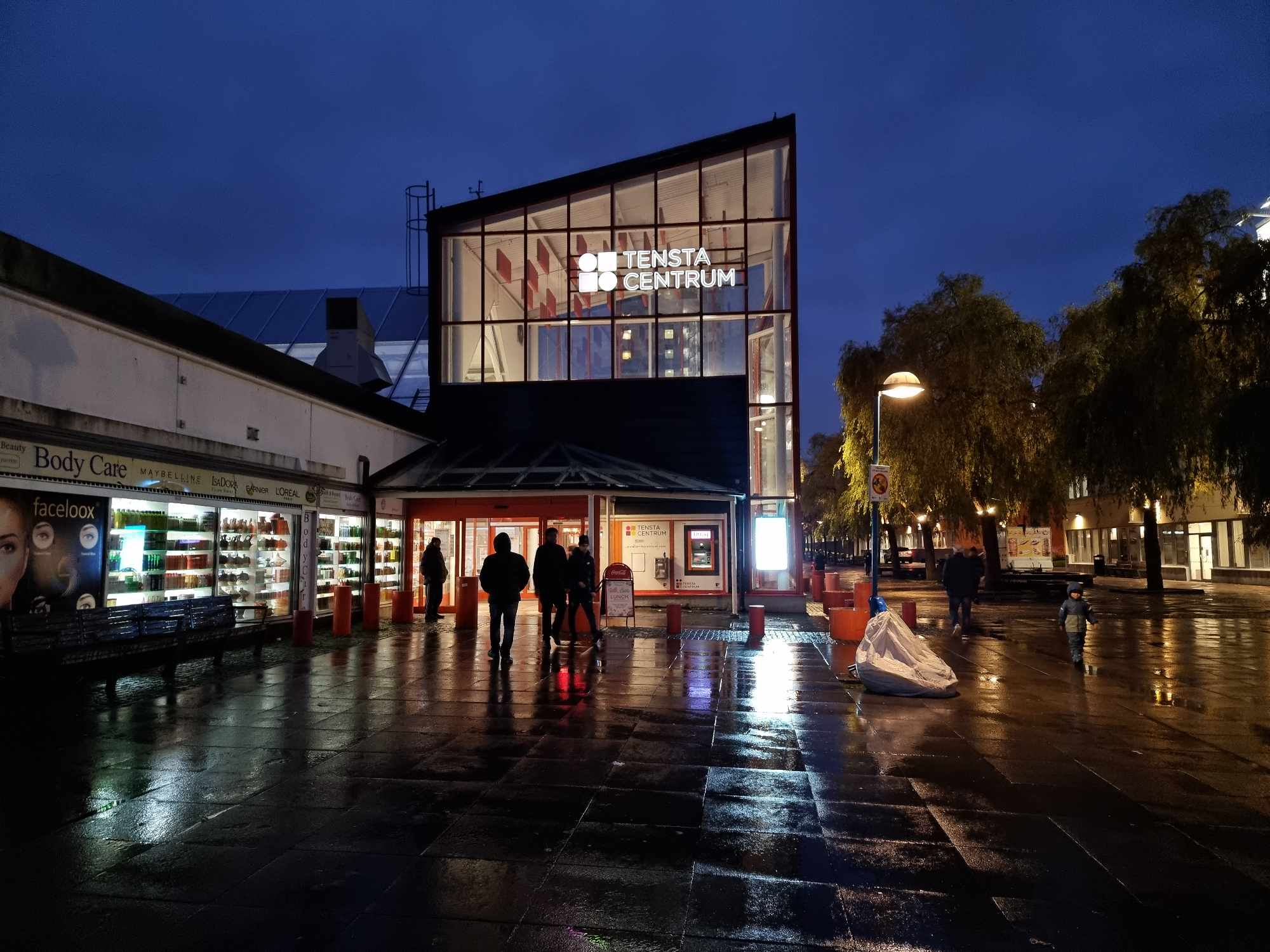
Tensta Centrum, a shopping centre

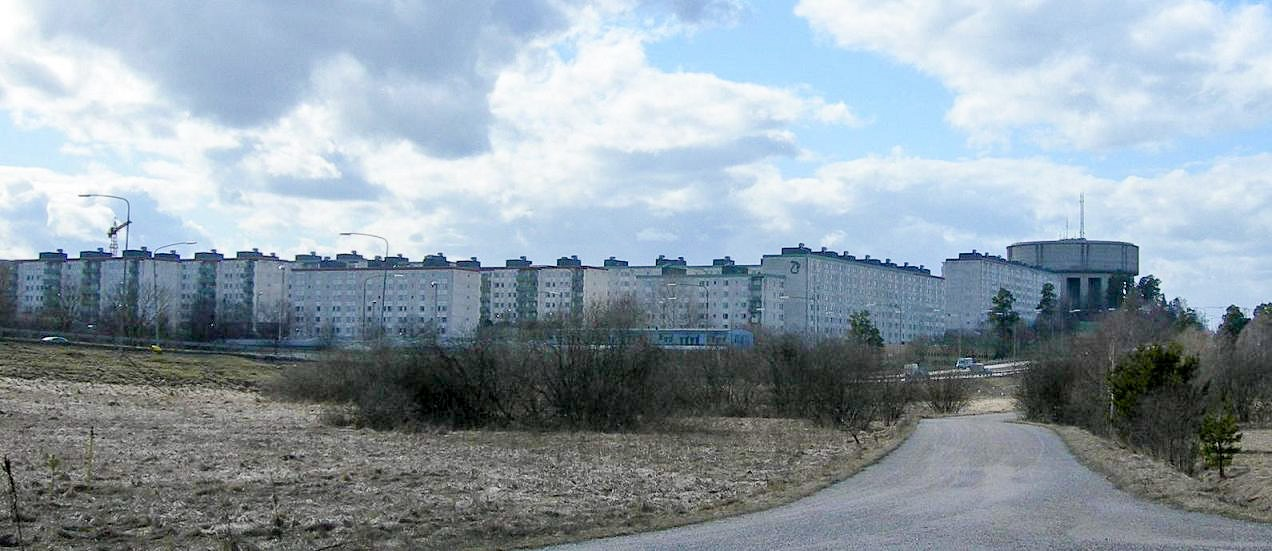
Tensta and its water tower. View from Järvafältet recreational area.

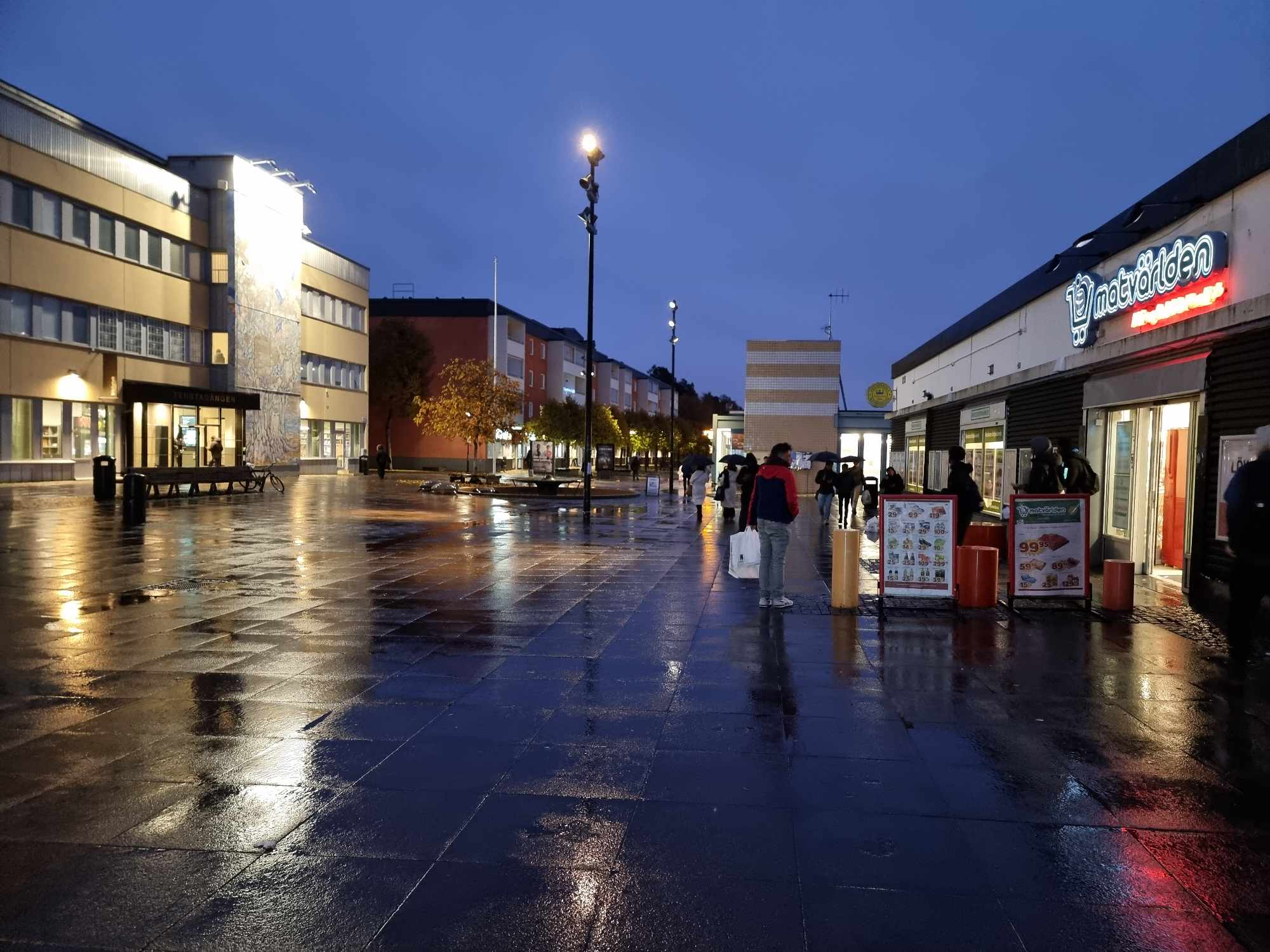
Central Tensta near the metro.

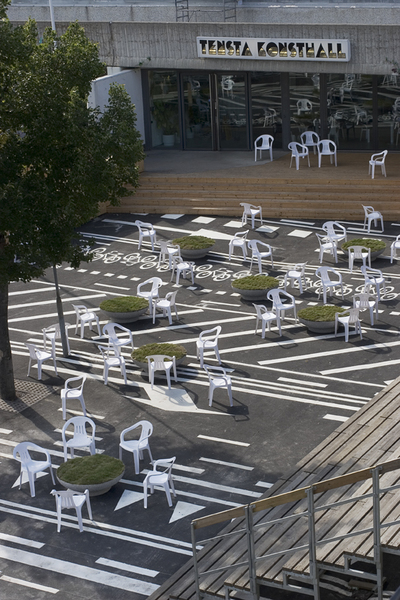
Tensta Konsthall, a centre for contemporary art.

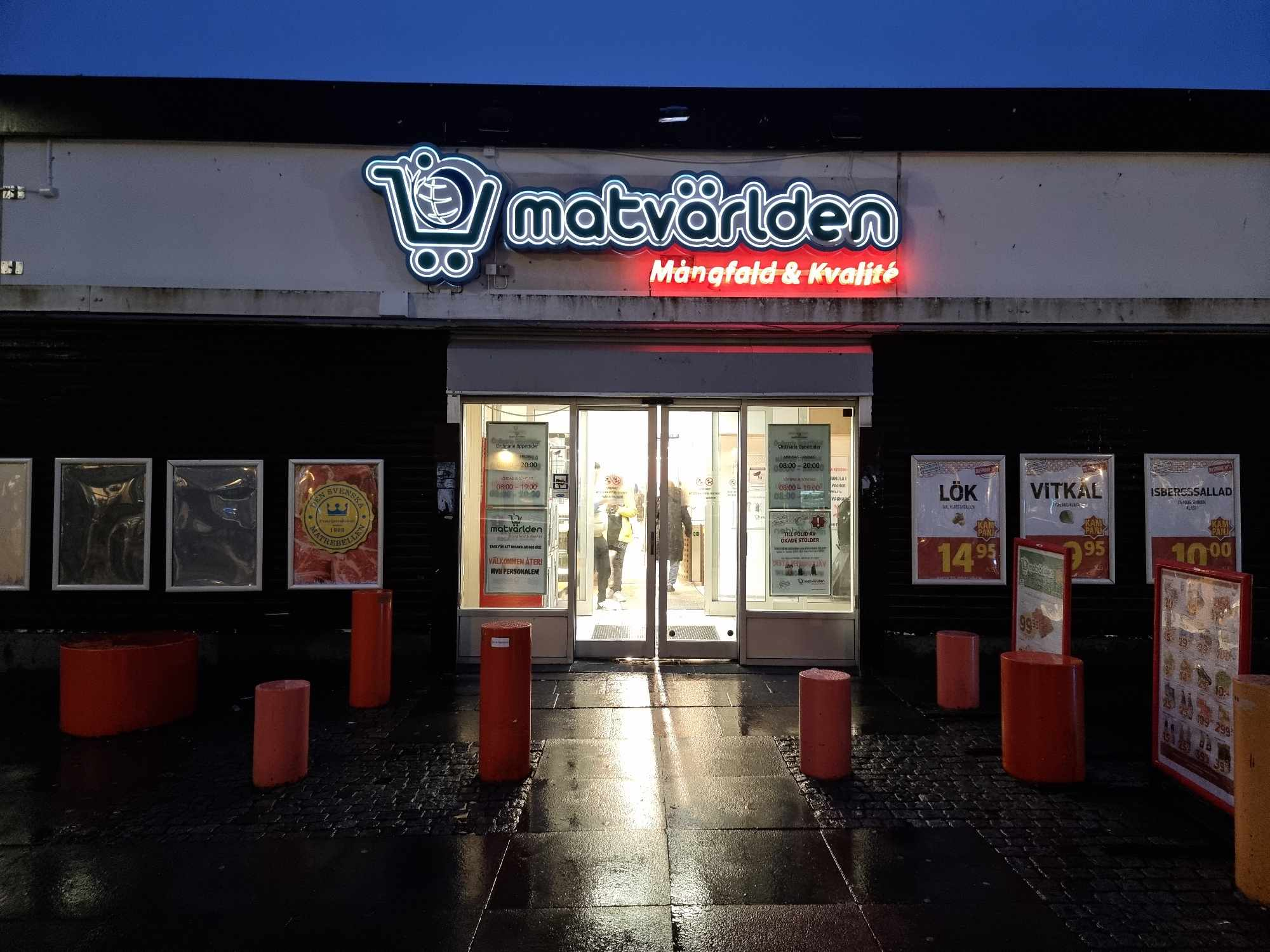
Grocery store in the heart of Tensta

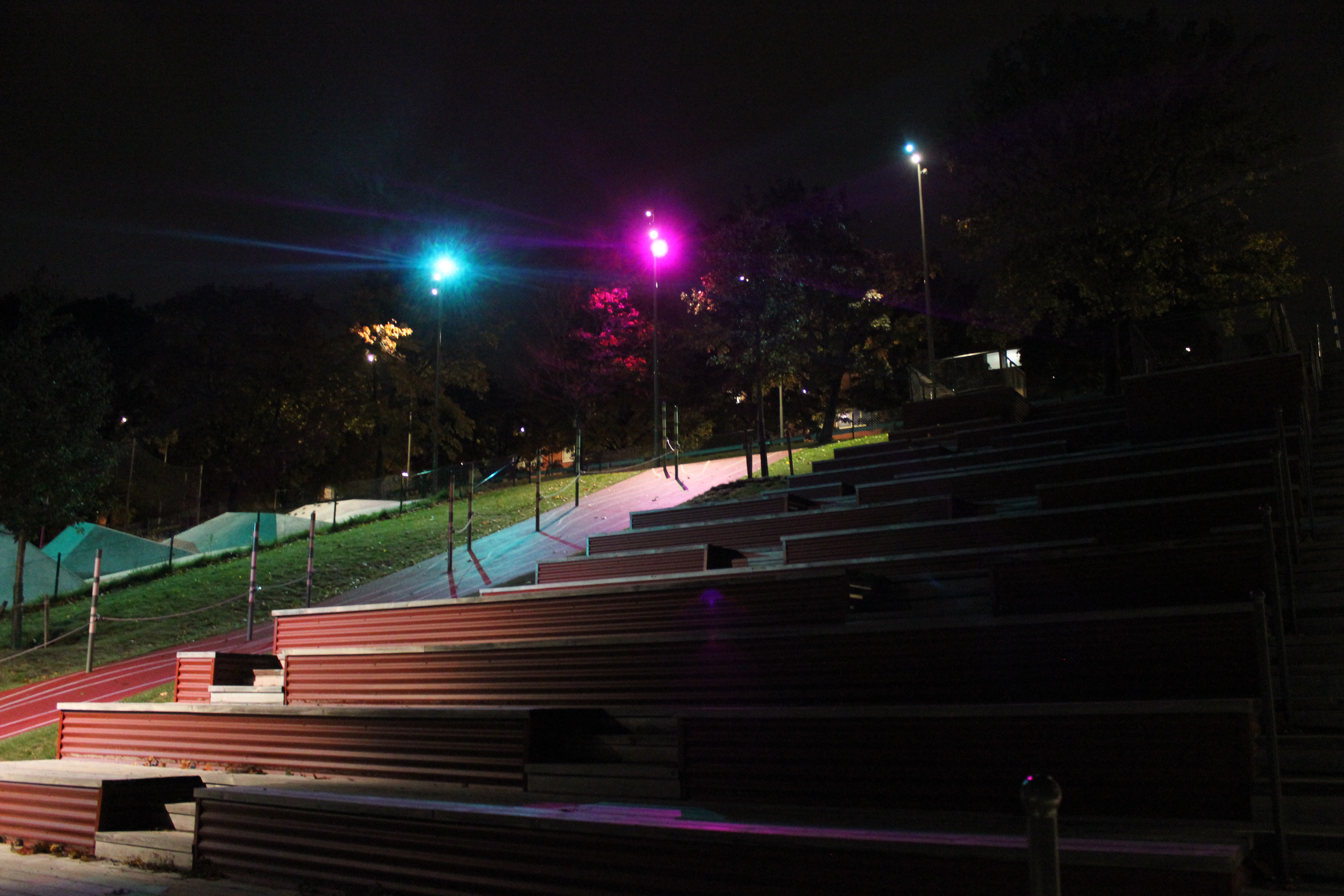
Stairs at the playground during night

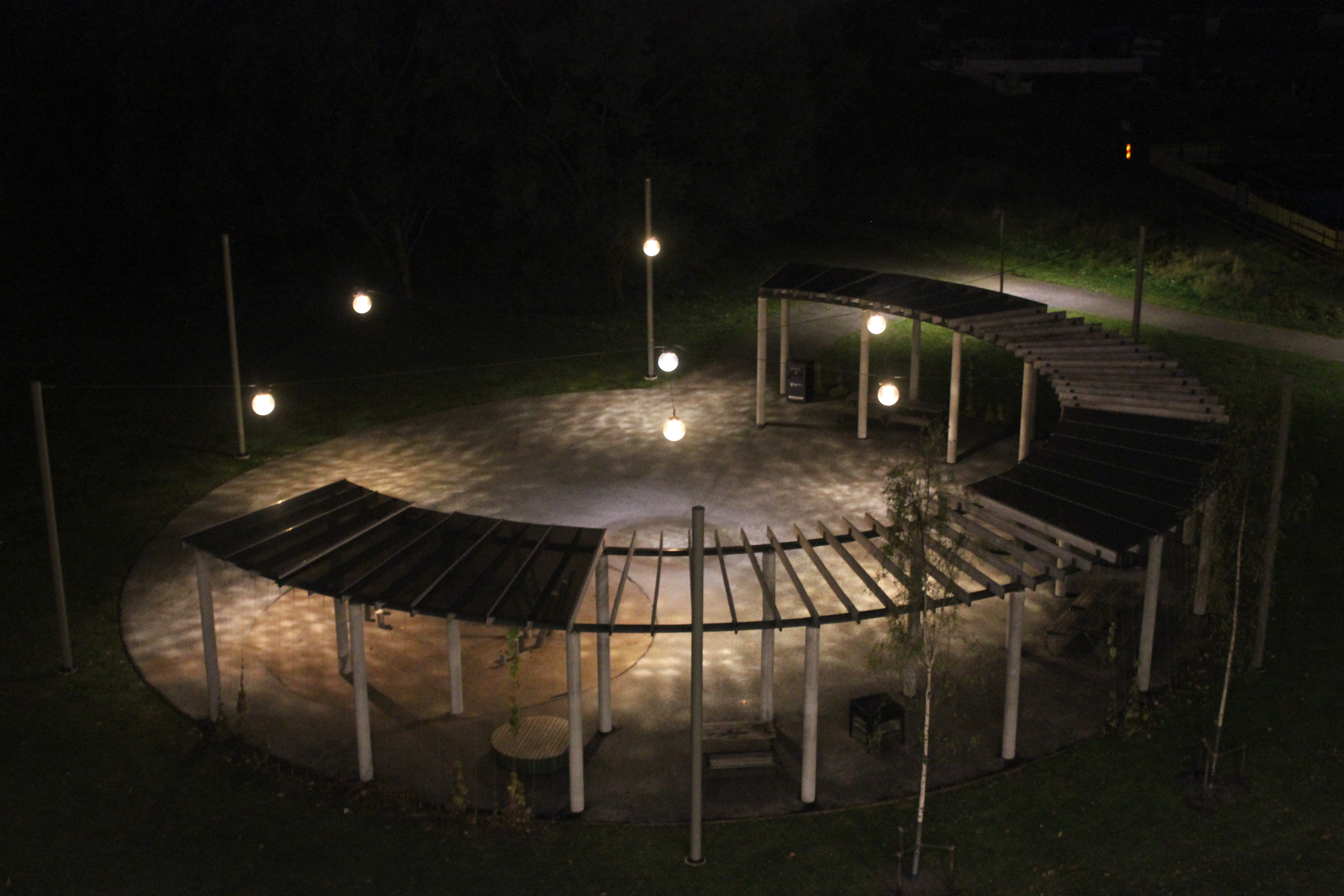
Communal space from top view during night

Tensta is a district in Spånga-Tensta borough, Stockholm, Sweden. There are about 6,000 apartments in Tensta and a population of 18,637 as of December 31, 2022.

Modern Tensta, with its Plattenbau-style concrete apartment buildings, was constructed in the 1960s. Like nearby Rinkeby and Hjulsta, it was part of the Million Programme, and became known nationwide in the late 1960s. This was partially because many people moved in when the area was still a construction site, and it took years before the metro station opened (in 1975).

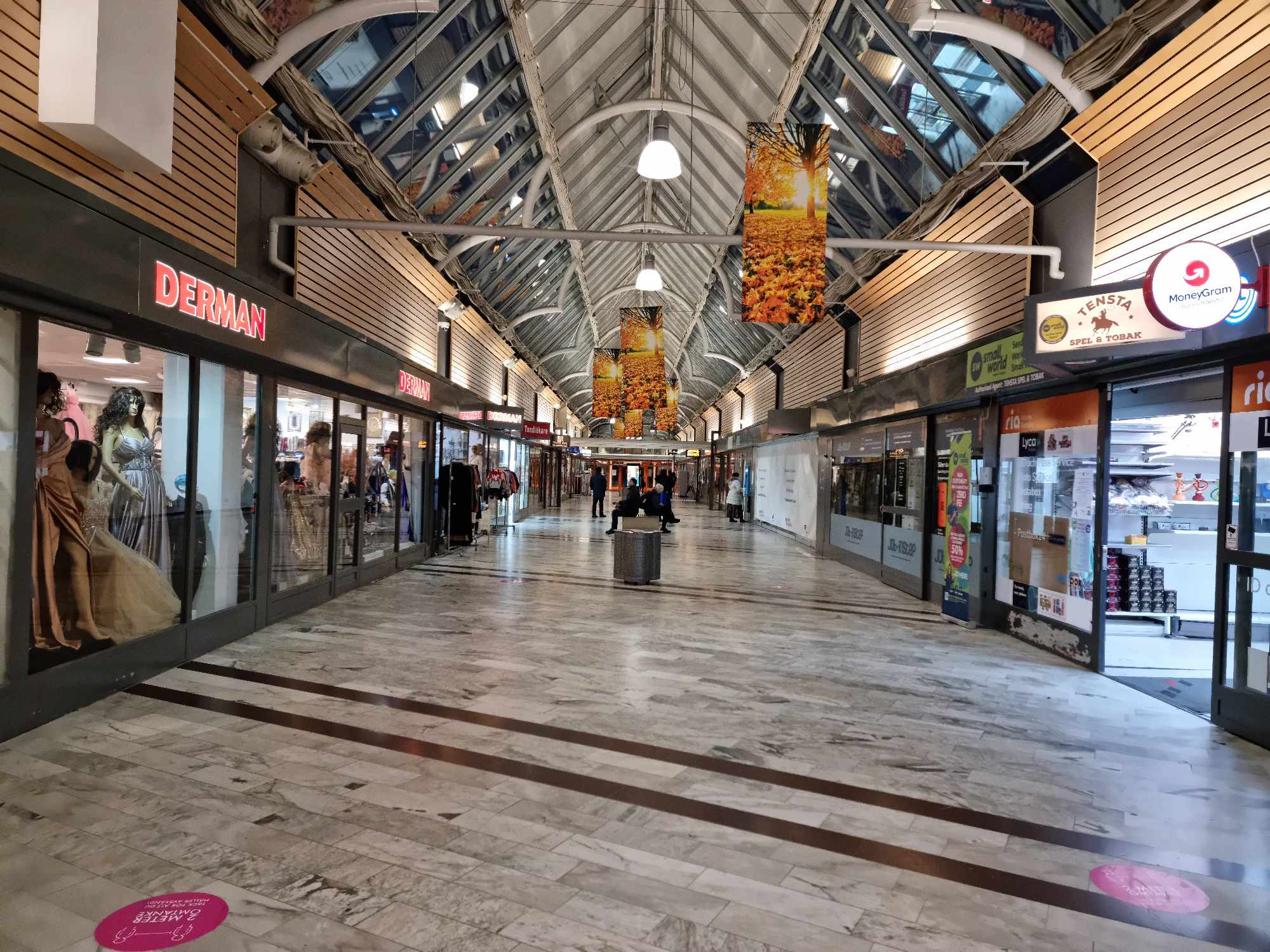
The Inside part of Tensta Centrum

In the center of Tensta, there is a small grocery market. The art gallery Tensta Konsthall is also situated close to the centre and has gained a name in Sweden and abroad.

The government has decided to award to 200 million kronor ($30 million) in performance based subsidies to boost fifteen of Sweden’s suburbs grappling with social exclusion. Tensta is one of the suburbs that have chosen to receive this cash injection. The districts will receive the cash injection at the end of 2013 at the earliest, after the results from the past year have been evaluated. The subsidy - which is performance based - will be awarded for three criteria: how the areas deal with education, employment, and social benefits.

In the 2011-13 period, about 53% of the population originated outside the EU and the Nordic countries. 49.3% were foreign born in 1990, 55.4% in 1994. In 1997, 79.6% had a foreign background, up to 85.9% in 2008, and 90.2% in 2024.

In its December 2015 report, Police in Sweden placed the district in the most severe category of urban areas with high crime rates.

== History ==
When the farm of Stora Tensta was demolished in the 1960s, it had probably stood on the same site for more than a thousand years.

Tensta is situated on the Järva field, which was used as a military training ground from 1907. The area was closed to the public. Several farms continued growing crops and raising livestock throughout the time the army exercised here, but the farmers were not allowed to cultivate virgin soil or erect new building.

In 1962 the government decided that almost the whole training ground should be made available for civil buildings. The aim was to build enough homes to eliminate the housing shortage. People living in cramped city flats without modern conveniences, and all the people moving to Stockholm, would acquire spacious and comfortable homes. The construction of Tensta went very fast. The general plan was approved in 1965. People began to move in two years later, and Tensta Centre was opened in 1970. The first inhabitants, mostly families with young children, lived for many years as pioneers on a building site with provisional bus lines, temporary food stores in huts, unfinished paths, and inadequate social service. The metro (also known as the tunnelbana) came to Tensta in 1975. The lime-lined avenue of Tenstagången leads straight through the district.

== Parks ==
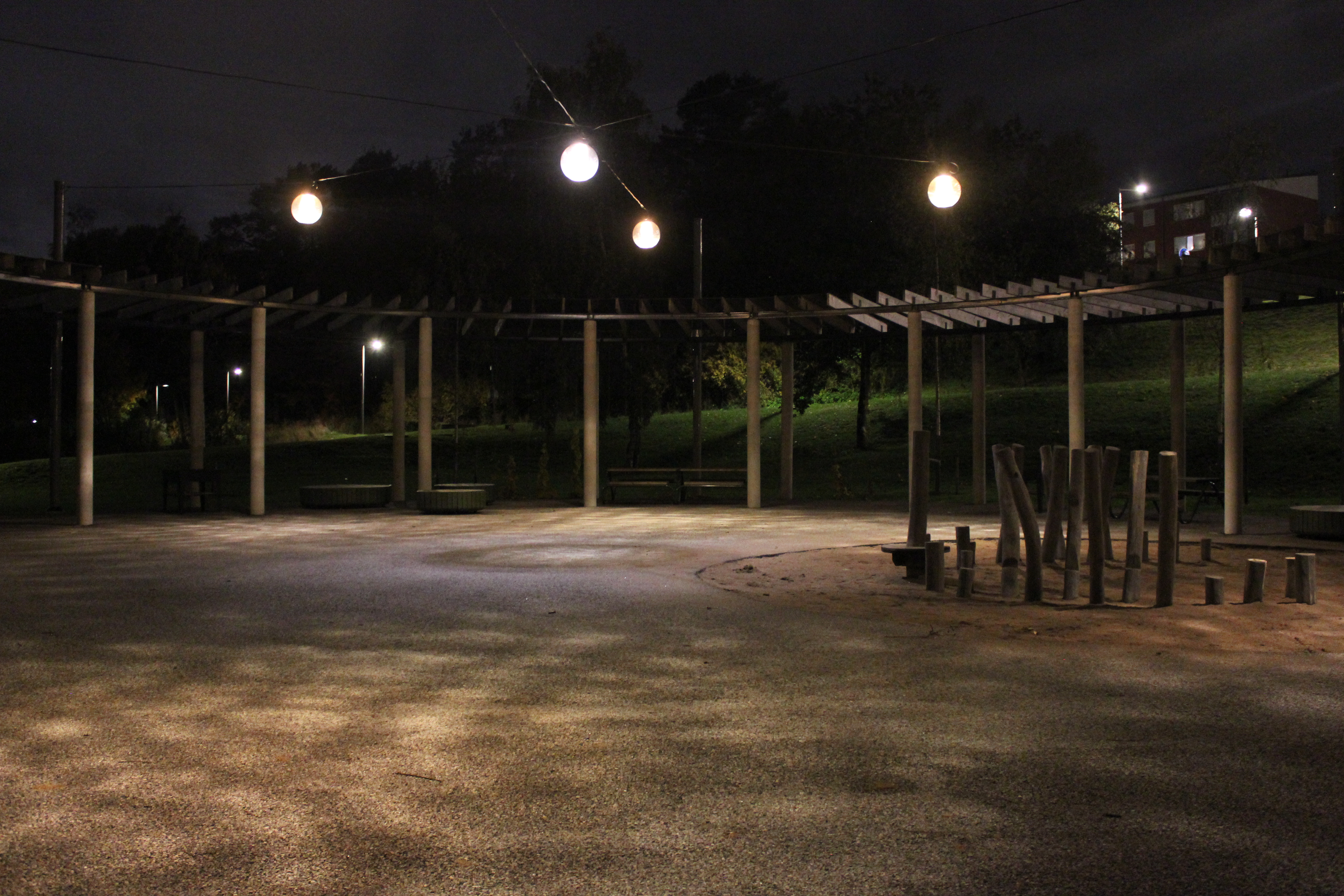
Communal space at night

Tensta, a district abundant with parks, offers enjoyment for both children and adults. Among its numerous parks, six are particularly popular. The most recent addition, Tenstadalens lekplats, was inaugurated on August 20, 2022. The park is designed to have a slide, a parkour park and uphill running tracks. A long staircase leads from Tenstavägen down to the park and wooden terraces that provide plenty of space to sit. In addition to the park, a communal space has been constructed. This area is designed for activities such as grilling and partying, providing a wonderful environment for people to enjoy themselves. This park’s unique design was influenced by the suggestions and active participation of Tensta and Hjulsta residents.

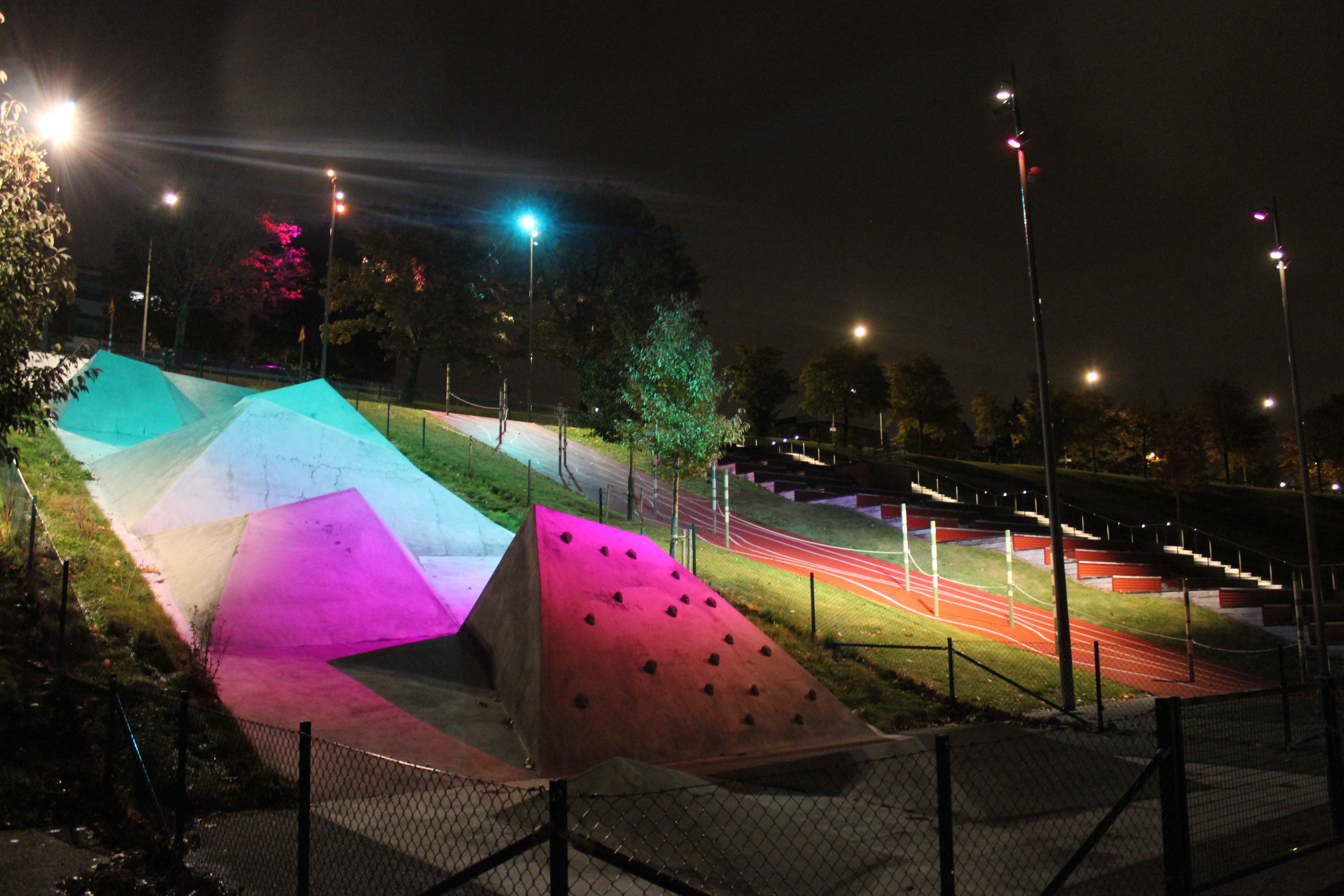
The playground at night

This initiative aligns with Stockholm’s “Grönare Stockholm” project, aimed at enhancing the city’s green spaces and promoting environmental sustainability. Currently, Stockholm is undertaking 37 projects citywide, including the creation of 25 parks, squares, and green lines. These projects also encompass the preservation of seven oak habitats, measures for amphibians, and initiatives addressing biodiversity, torrential rain, and heat islands.

Out of these initiatives, four are currently active in Tensta. It is anticipated that more projects will be introduced in this district in the future.

== Notable people from Tensta ==
- Victoria Kawesa (born 1975), politician
- Anders Sparrman (1748–1820), naturalist
- Adam Tensta (born 1983), rapper

== Gallery ==
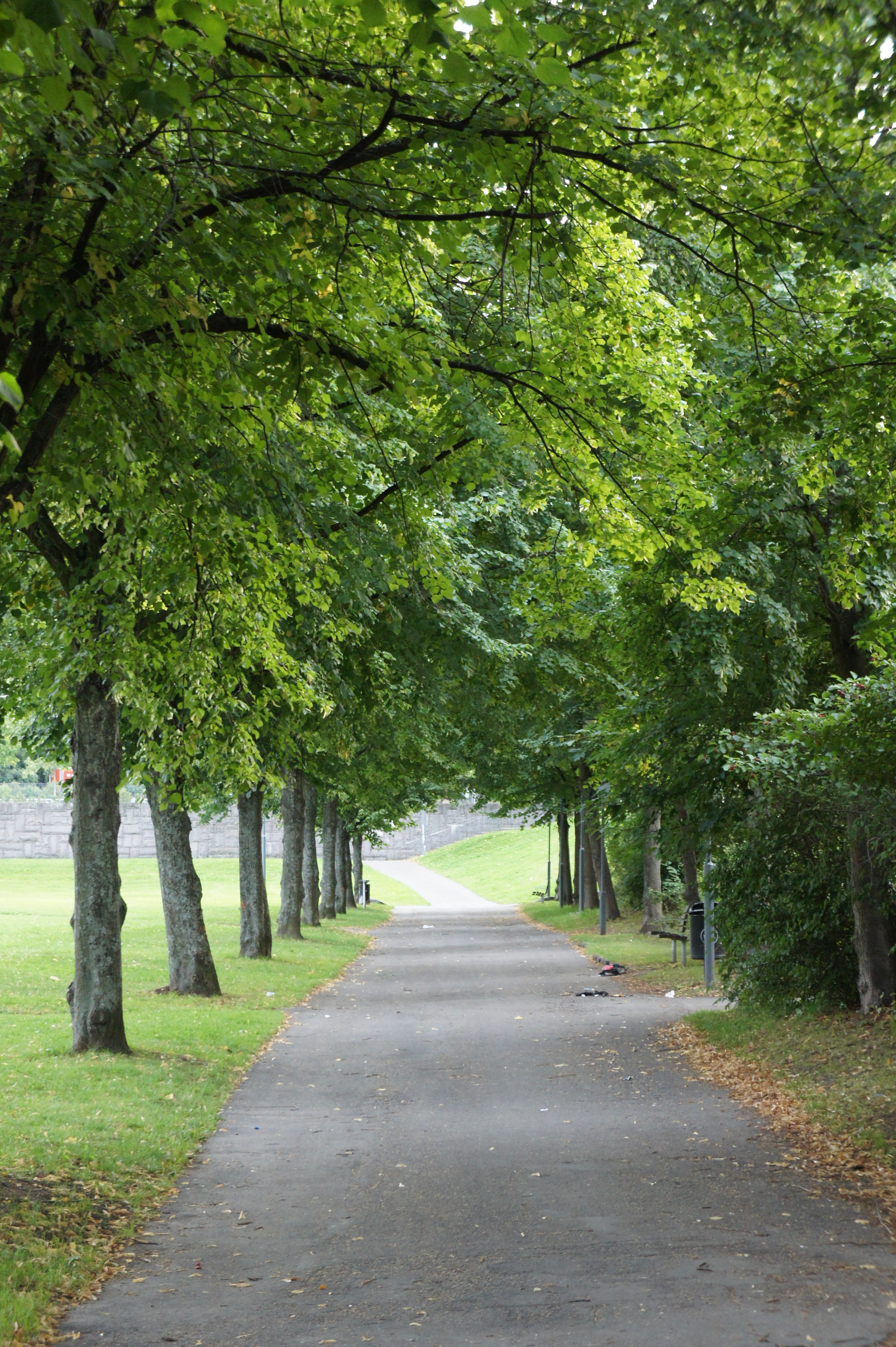

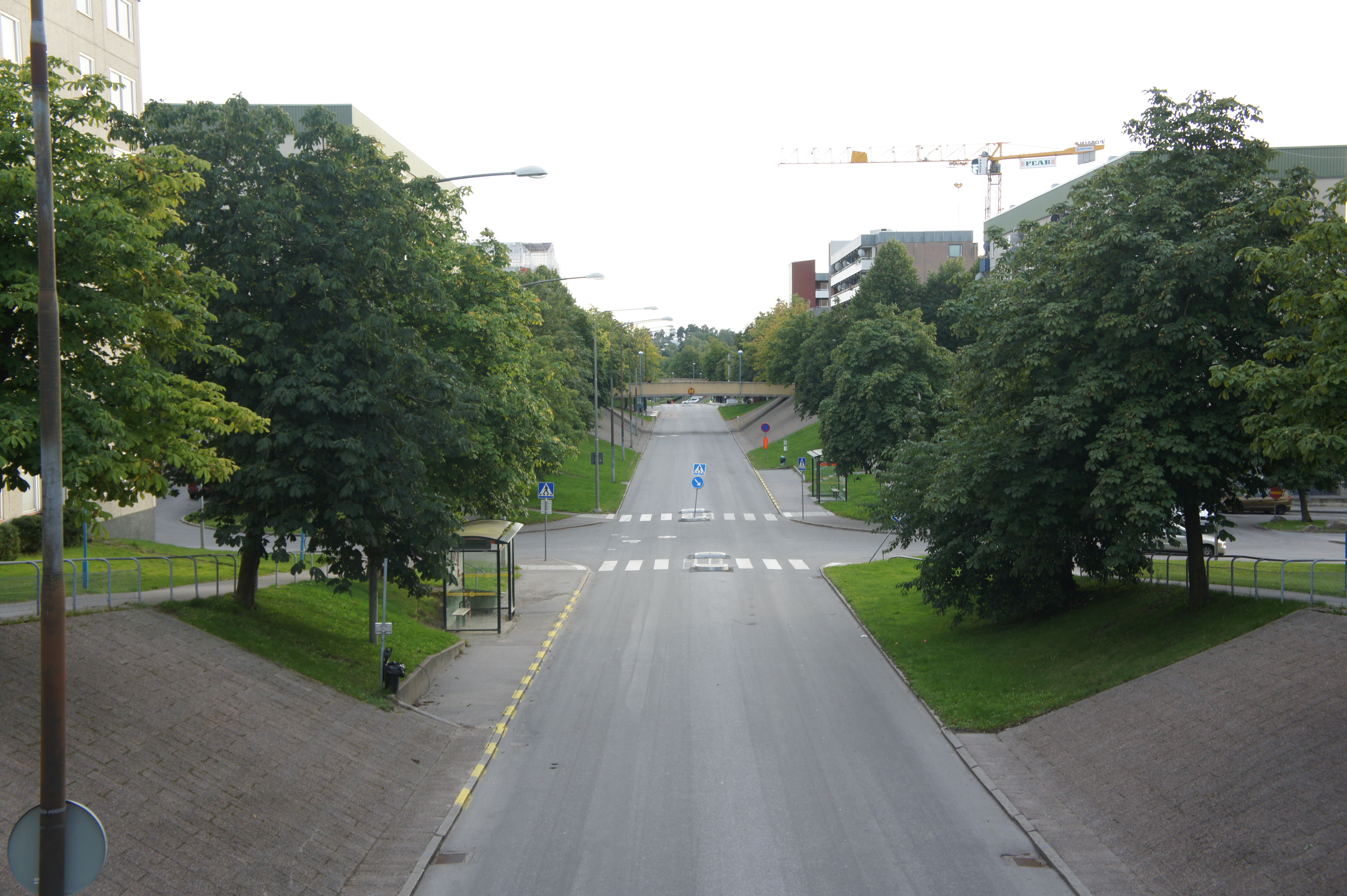

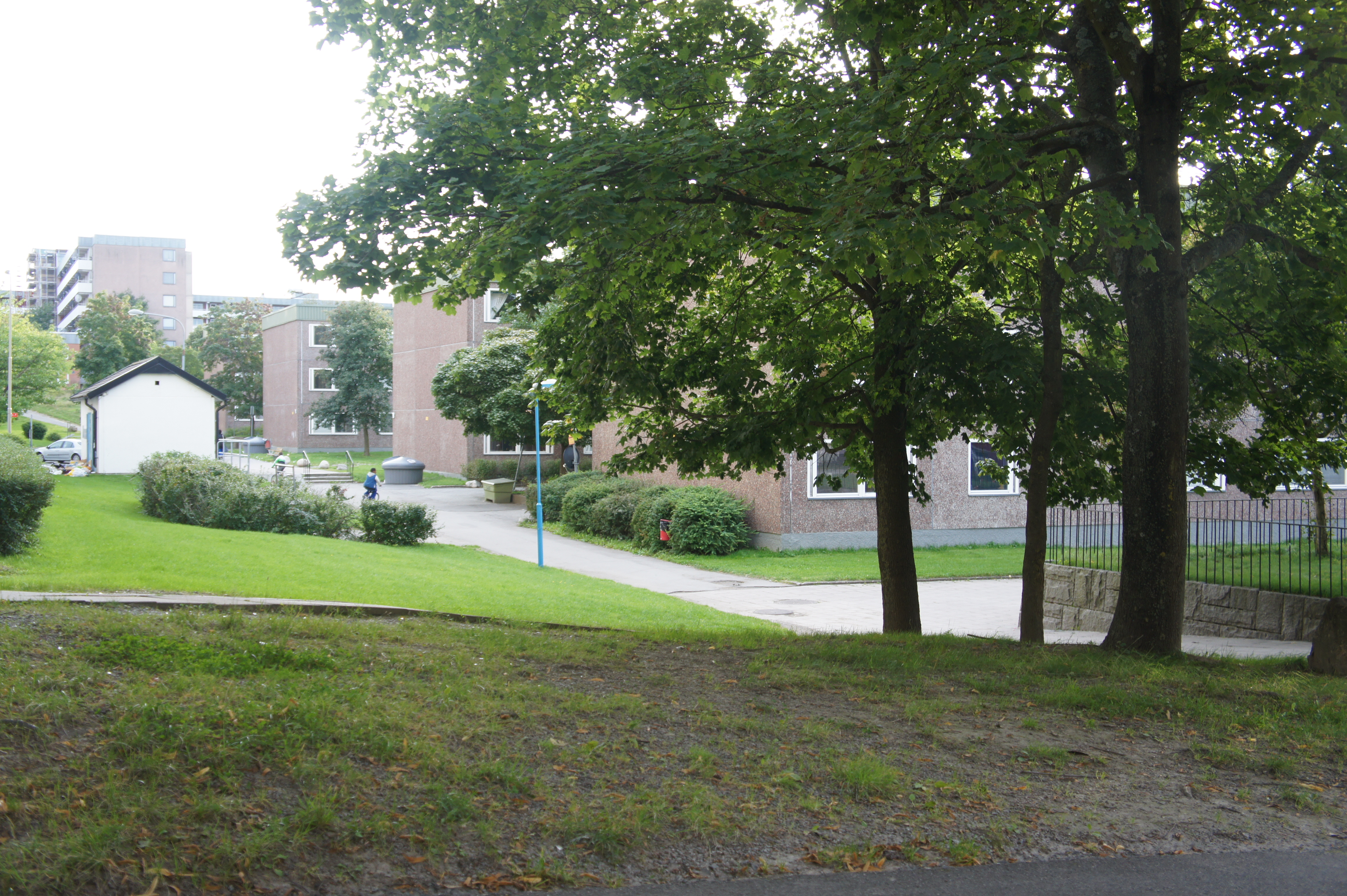

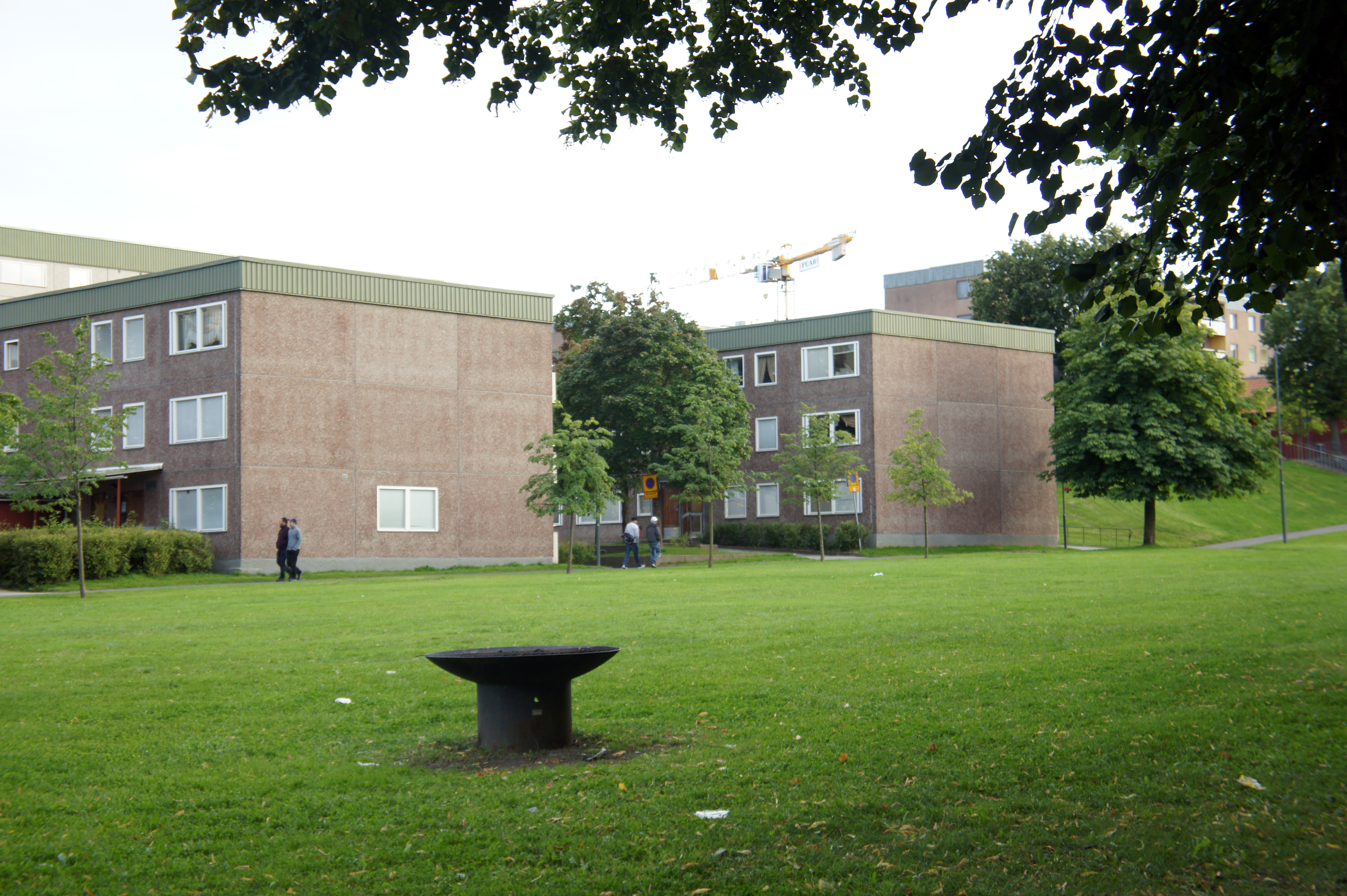

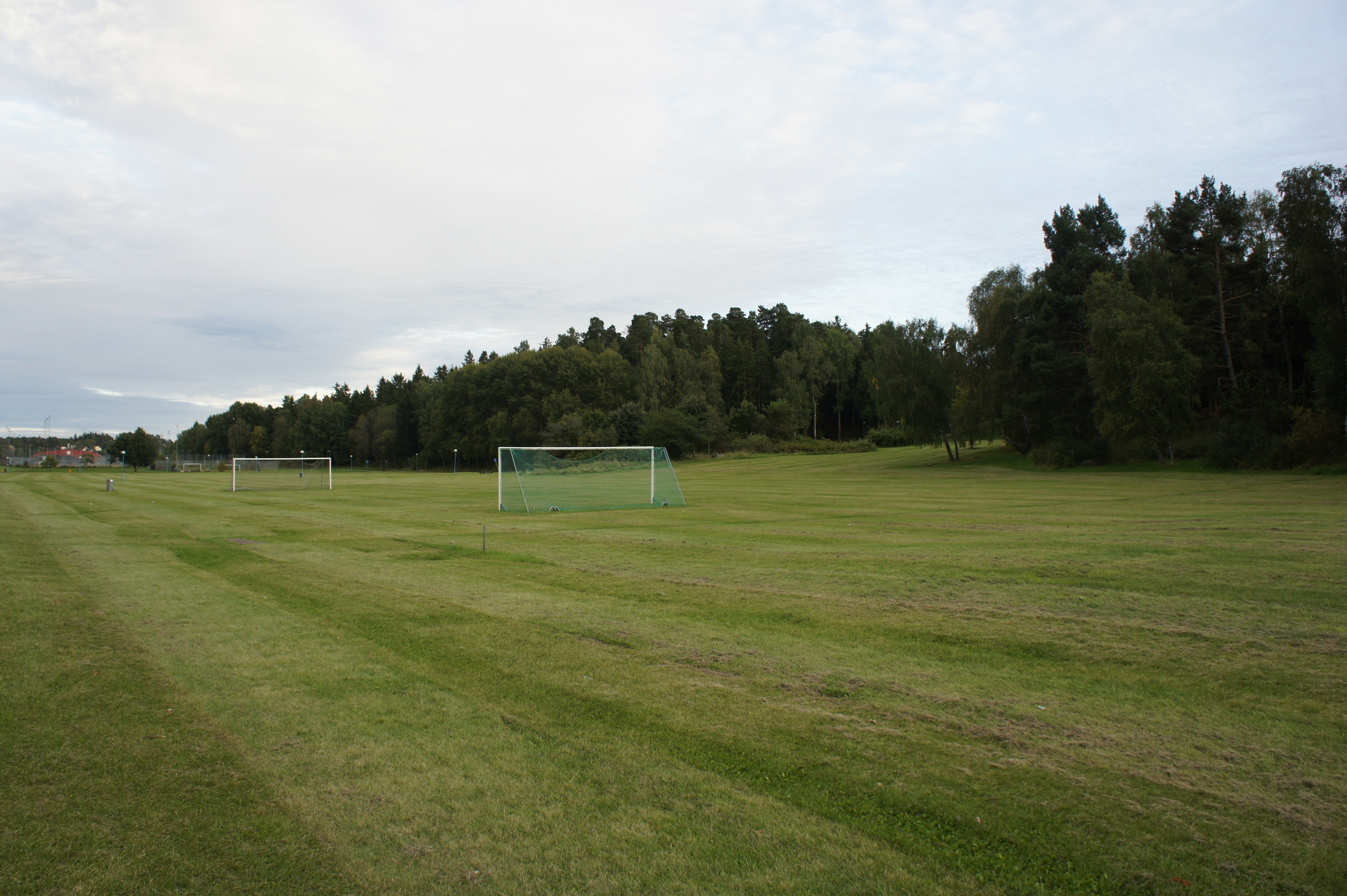

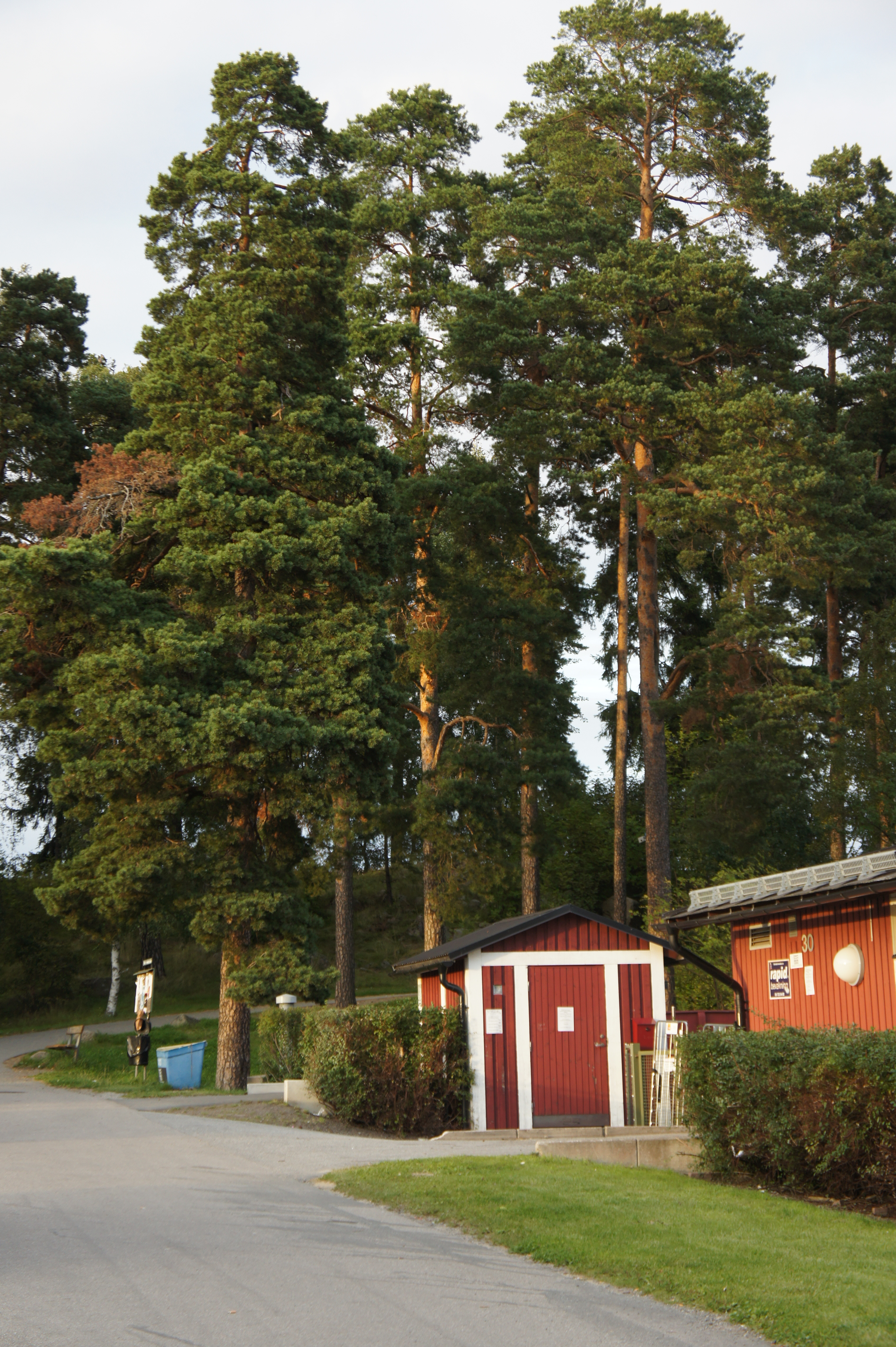

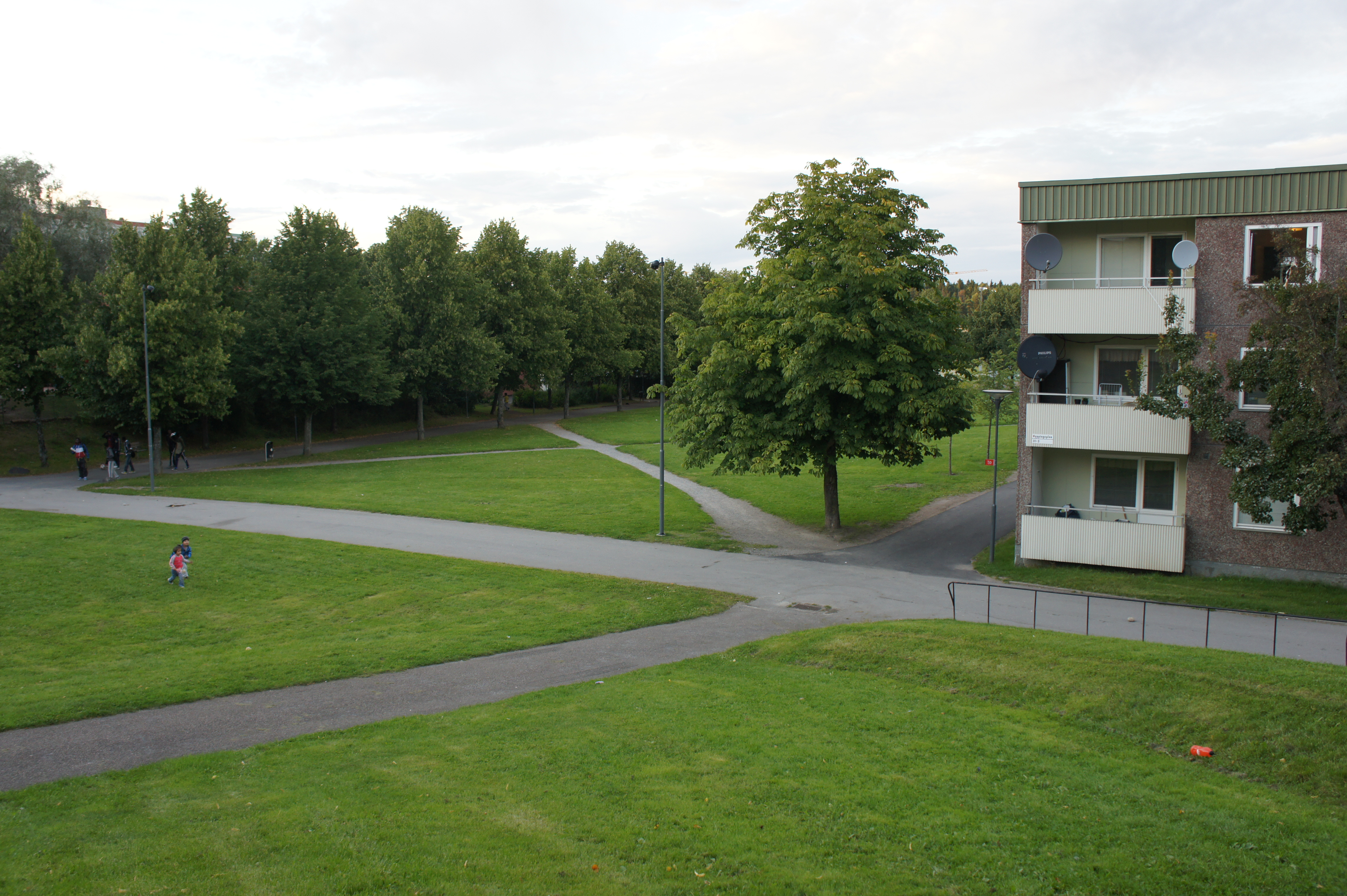

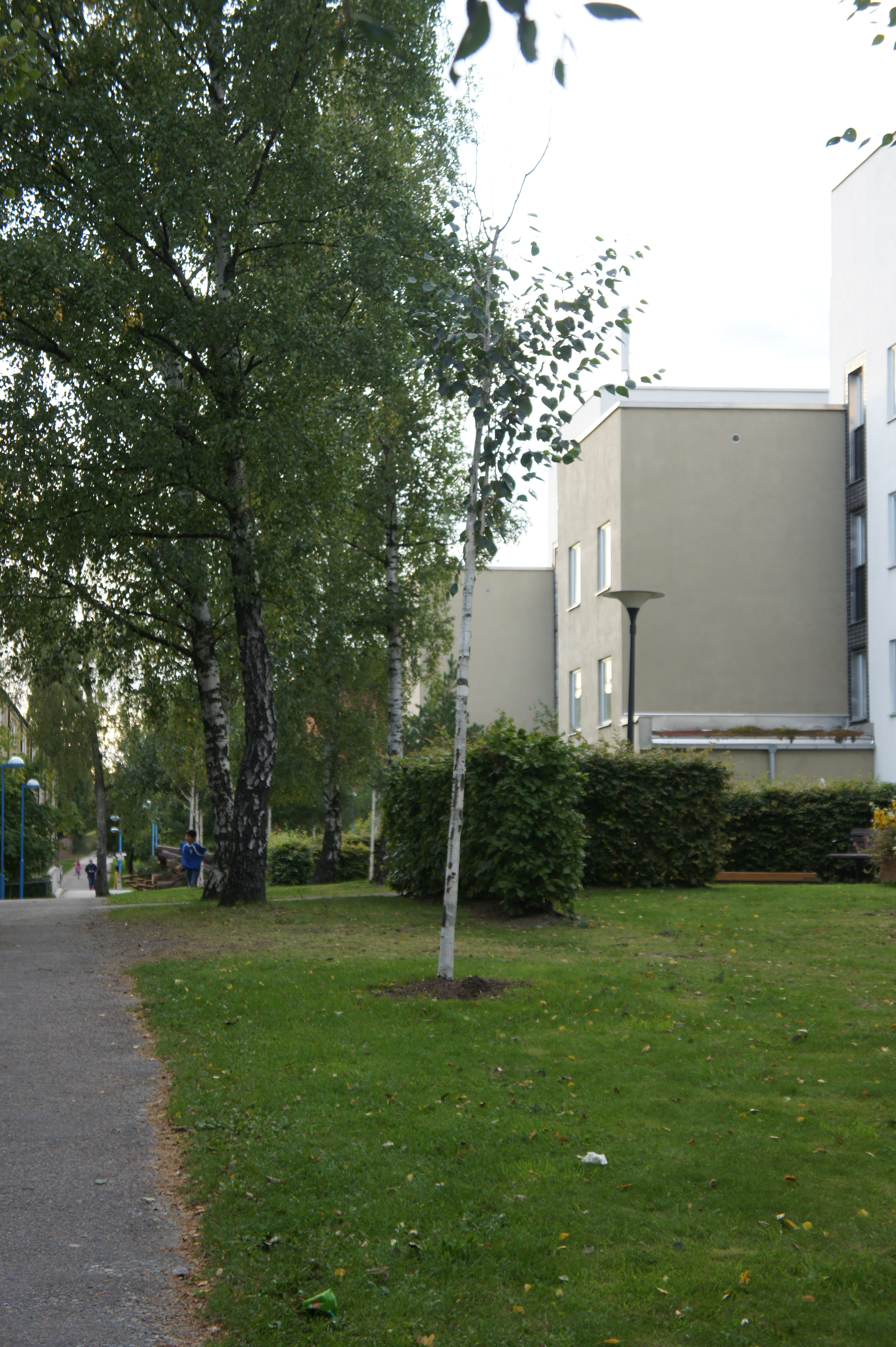

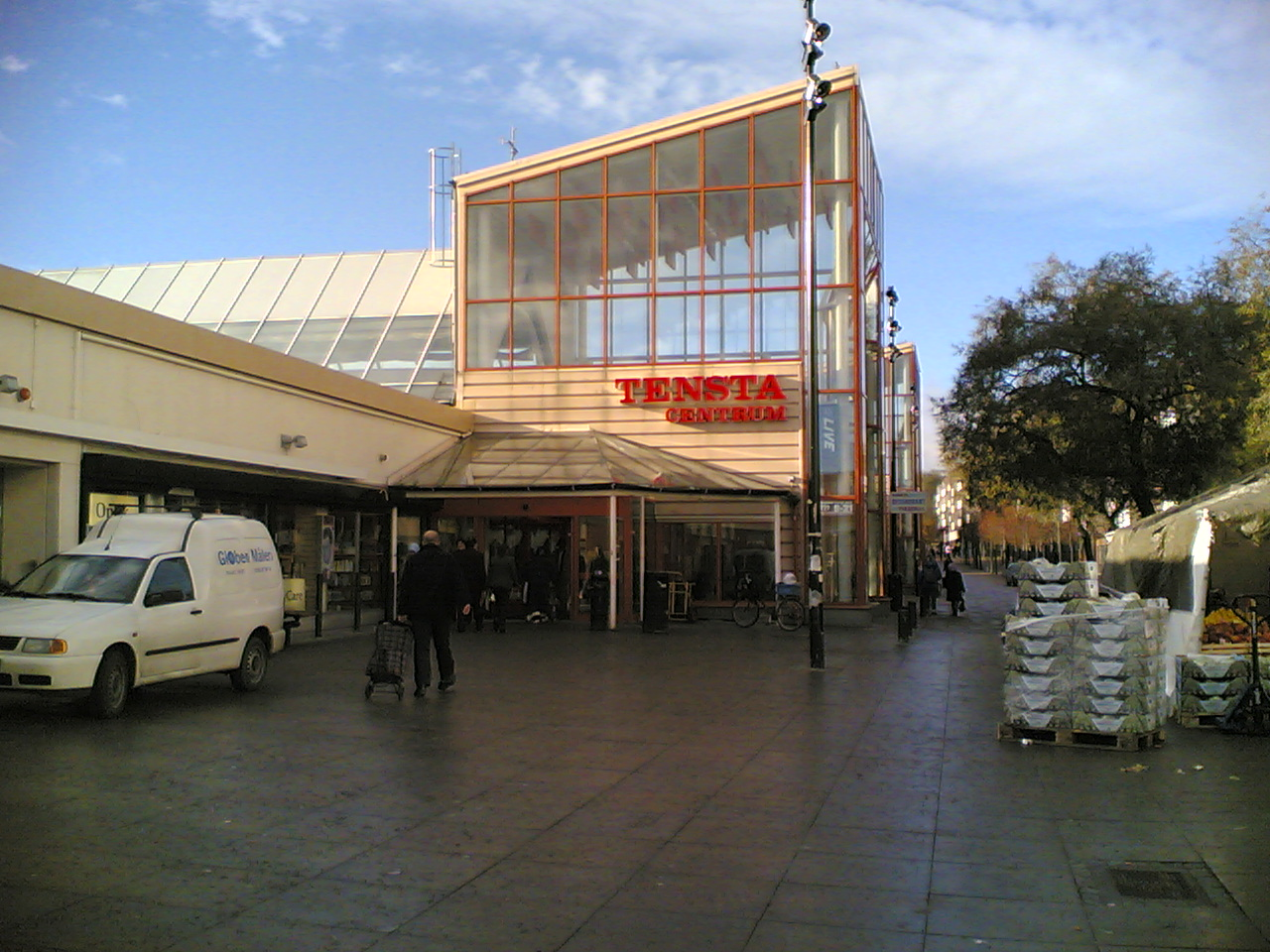
Tensta Centrum many years ago
