= Elke Solomon =

American artist and author (1943–2024)

- Born: April 10, 1943; Rochester, New York, U.S.
- Died: January 9, 2024 (aged 80)
- Known for: Painting, drawing, object-making, performance and installation
- Spouse(s): Michael Kwartler, architect
- Website: elkesolomon.com

Elke Solomon (April 10, 1943 – January 9, 2024) was an American artist, curator, educator and community worker. She was known for her interdisciplinary practice that combines painting, drawing, object-making, performance and installation. Solomon exhibited widely in the United States and abroad.

== Early life and education ==
Born in Rochester, New York, Solomon grew up in Detroit. She attended Wayne State University, The Society of Arts and Crafts, and received a BA and MA in Art History and Painting from the University of Michigan. She studied with Art Historians: Paul Grigaut, Nathan Whitman, Clifford Olds, Eileen Forsyth, Dick Seers, and Painting Department: Oleg Grabar.

== Career ==
Solomon began her career in roles as: Artist and Curator of the Bartch Collection, Department of Art and Archaeology, Princeton, NJ (1964–66); and Associate Prints and Drawings Curator at The Whitney Museum of American Art (1969-1975); and educator, where she taught studio courses (painting and drawing), art history and theory: Parsons School of Art and Design, The New School, Columbia University, City College of New York, New York Feminist Art Institute., Princeton University, Portland State University, and Pratt Institute. She curated: Louis Lozowick (1972–73); Vija Celmins (1974), her first solo exhibition in NYC; Alice Neel: Painting Retrospective (1974); a comprehensive show of American drawings entitled “American Drawings: 1963-73” (1973); Chryssa: Selected Prints and Drawings, 1959-1962” (1972); and “John Altoon: Drawings and Prints”(1971). She instituted the exhibition of the Whitney's ground floor walls and was curator in The Whitney Painting Department for first Whitney Biennial (1976); She continued curatorial work with Independent Curators International (ICI) and freelance.

From 1977 to 1985, Solomon made abstract paintings and drawings and public performances. Solomon was an A.I.R. Gallery Artist from 1981 to 2000 and served on their board.

=== Performances ===
Her one-woman performances were verbal and addressed political issues such as: anti-semitism, property, class, etc. For example, Tunafish Tales was performed in New York, NY (at the Mudd Club with Thom Fogarty ) and traveled to other cities in the U.S. Carrie Rickey reviewed this work in ARTFORUM (1979): ““Twentieth-century performance has found inspiration in dance, music, cabaret and theatre, but no one to my knowledge has ever before found inspiration in talk-show schtick. Elke Solomon does. An accomplished painter, draughtsperson, conceptual artist and curator, Solomon’s Tunafish Tales is a Catskills-cum-Vegas monologue with the outrageousness of Joan Rivers delivering an encyclical to a constituency including the pontiff, the ayatollah and Johnny Carson ... Humor: One of the advantages to being Jewish in America is the time saved in searching for pork in a can of pork and beans.”

Her final performances included: "The Bar-Mitzvah Lounge," bi-weekly social media posts, 2020–2021, "Early Bird Bingo! at the Early Bird Special Cafe: Another Installation," A.I.R. Gallery, Brooklyn, NY, 2018, performers included Lulu Fogarty and audience players; "A Tavola! A Performance," presented by Magic Time! and Judson Memorial Church, NYC, 2013.

=== Paintings and Drawings / Cut-Outs and Stencils ===
In 2000, Solomon began cutting stencils of identifiable objects from Western culture. The images were initially painted with an overall format – disjunctive, non-formal, non-hierarchical and non-compositional, casual – and shared the same space on the plane of the painting. Viewers therefore, construct meaning by prompting an internal dialogue about the nature of the images' inherent narratives (e.g. social narrative).

Susan Putterman, Parson's School of Design, on Solomon's practice: "Vibrantly colored, cut-out paintings and drawings of abstract shapes are the focal point of Elke Solomon’s new body of work. Perhaps best known for her tough-minded, black and white, architecturally inspired drawings, this work marks a new direction for Solomon. Aside from the most obvious change - the use of bold color – these drawings and paintings incorporate a deep understanding of the drawing medium and its relationship to painting." Solomon, referring to her use of ‘dumb color,’ implied that she was not interested in making mannered, artfully composed paintings."

Drawing, for Solomon, was the fundamental, skeletal underpinning of all her work. Starting with an image in the world, she modified it into an abstracted, non-representational shape by making numerous black and white preparatory studies. The exhibition, which consisted of thirteen modestly scaled cut-outs, and several oversized drawings and paintings, was based on one model drawing.

=== Installation ===
"Early Bird Special Cafe: Another Installation," A.I.R. Gallery, Brooklyn, NY, 2018. "A Tavola! An Installation," A.I.R. Gallery, Brooklyn, NY, 2010.

== Death ==
Solomon died on January 9, 2024, at the age of 80.

== Publications ==
=== Heresies, a founding editor ===
Solomon was one of the founding editors of Heresies: A Feminist Publication on Art and Politics.

Solomon wrote for a number of publications including: "Mother Reader: Essential Writings on Motherhood," Edited by Moyra Davey; “On Motherhood and Apple Pie” in M/E/A/N/I/N/G, An Anthology of Artist's Writings, Theory and Criticism, ed. Susan Bee and Mira Schor, Duke University Press, 2000 (original article 1992)

=== Plenty ===
A collection of observational snapshots by Elke Solomon, published by M Press, Essay by Nancy Princenthal. The book was reviewed by Barbara A. MacAdam for ARTnews, "The beauty is in the echoing of image and thing and in the implication that repetition may be both the staff and stuff of life ... In this subtle but assertive body of work, marked by rigor and humor, formalism and even lyricism, we focus on the nature of art and life, how the picture of a thing becomes its symbol, the idea of the thing."

== Selected collections ==
- The Brooklyn Museum, Brooklyn, NY
- The Cincinnati Art Museum, Cincinnati, OH
- The Metropolitan Museum of Art, New York, NY
- Milwaukee Museum of Art, Milwaukee, WI
- The Museum of Contemporary Art Chicago, IL
- The Museum of Modern Art, New York, NY
- The Philadelphia Museum of Art, Philadelphia, PA
- Yale University Art Gallery, New Haven, CT
