= Patricia Esquivias =

Venezuelan artist (born 1979)

Patricia Esquivias (born 1979) is a Venezuelan-born Spanish artist who works primarily with video.

== Life ==
She was born in 1979 in Caracas. Esquivias received her BA from Central Saint Martins College of Art and Design in London in 2001 and her MFA from California College of the Arts in San Francisco in 2007. Esquivias' work is often characterized as a form of story telling, and Esquivias often acts as narrator, using her own voice as narration in her videos. Many of Esquivias' videos center around themes of history and memory.

== Exhibitions ==
Esquivias has had shows in Madrid Los Angeles, New York City, Marrakesh and other cities around the world. Her work is in the collection of the Museo Reina Sofia, Madrid.

=== Past shows ===
- "Fireflies in the Night", Stavros Niarchos Foundation Cultural Center, Athens (2015)
- Objectif, Belgium (2011)
- 3rd Edition Marrakech Biennale, Marrakesh (2009)
- Murray Guy gallery, New York
- IEASTinternational exhibition, Norwich University of the Arts (2007)
- Akademie Schloss Solitude, Stuttgart, Germany (2011)
- Museo Nacional Centro de Arte Reina Sofía, Madrid (2009)
- Midway Contemporary Art, Minneapolis (2009)
- Institute of Contemporary Art, Philadelphia (2009)
- Espai d'art contemporani de Castelló, Castellón de la Plana, Spain (2009)
- New Museum, New York (2009)
- Instituto Valencia de Arte Moderna, Valencia, Spain (2009)
- University of California Berkeley Art Museum (2008)
- Fifth Berlin Biennial for Contemporary Art (2008)
- Stedelijk Museum, Amsterdam (2008)

== Works ==
- Folklore I (2005)
- Reads Like the Paper (2005–2010)
- The Future Was When? (2009)
- Of a short stay (2010–2011)
- Natures at the Hand (2006)
