= Michael Portnoy =

American artist (born 1971)

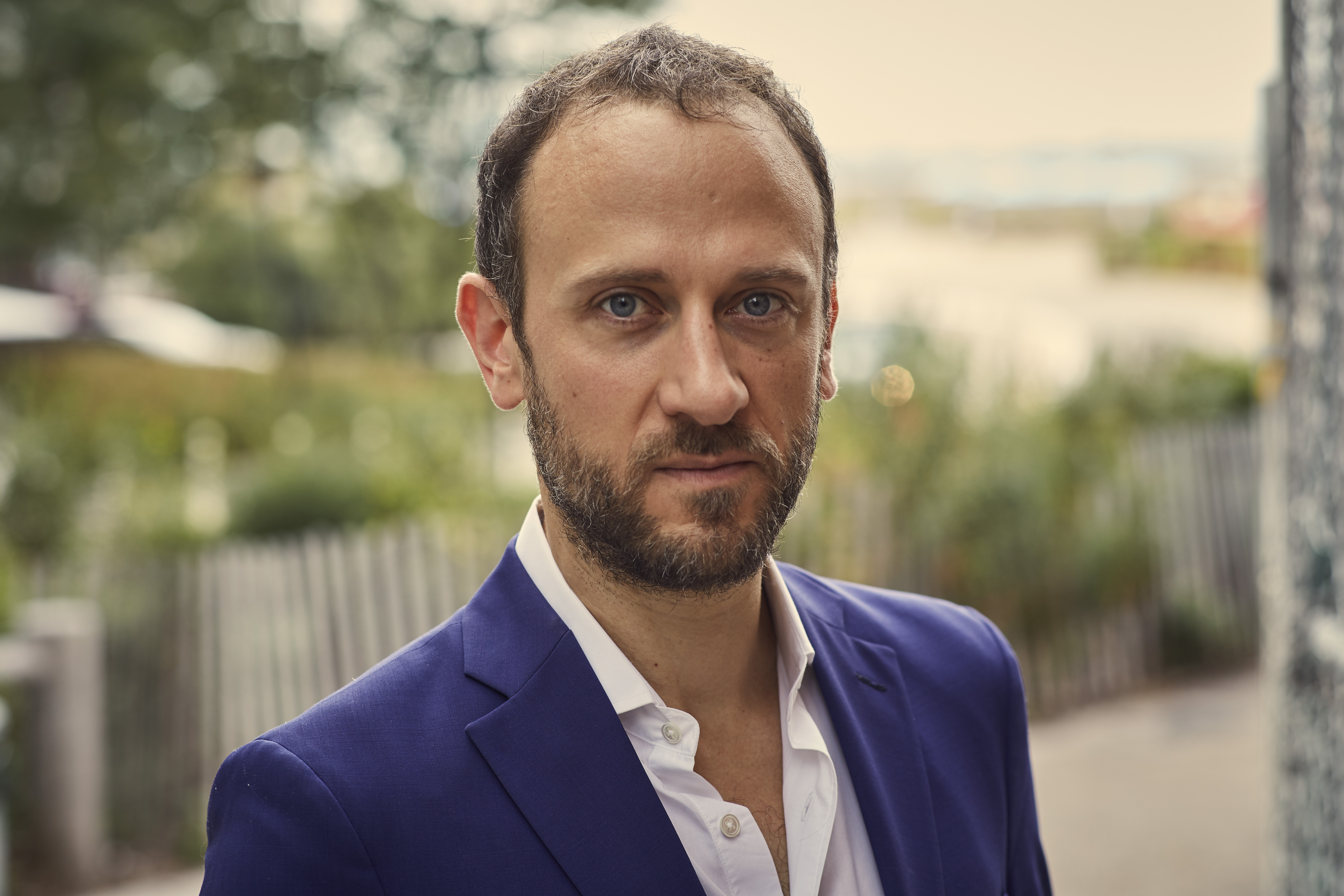
- Portnoy in 2016
- Born: August 2, 1971 (age 55); Washington, D.C., U.S.
- Education: Vassar College
- Known for: performance art, film, sculpture, dance, theater
- Website: strangergames.com

Michael Portnoy (born August 2, 1971) is an American visual artist, filmmaker, choreographer and performance artist. He calls himself a "Director of Behavior". He has been described in Art in America as "one of the most interesting performance artists anywhere", and by Artforum as "the great Absurdist".

== Background and early work ==
Portnoy was born in Washington, D.C., attended Georgetown Day School, and studied comparative literature and creative writing at Vassar College and theater at the National Theater Institute at The Eugene O'Neill Theater Center. After moving to New York City, he formed several short-lived experimental theater groups and then began concentrating on solo performance. His early performance works, such as Gymnastics and Schizophrenia and 5teen3sy: Kicking Games of Lip, were antic and unpredictable, and characterized by dense language play, song and movement fragments and rapid transformations of character. In the mid-1990s, Portnoy regularly performed in venues such as Surf Reality and Luna Lounge's weekly show "Eating It", the epicenter of New York's alternative comedy scene. His wild and abstract theatrical performances, which occasionally interrupted and challenged other comedians on stage, prompted Time Out New York to describe him as "the bad boy of comedy", and the New York Post to dub him "the next Andy Kaufman". At the same time, Portnoy started working as a dancer for the New York choreographer Koosil-Ja Hwang and as an actor. He also sang and performed his own operatic, electro-progressive-rock music as XAR, and with the band The Liquid Tapedeck.

== Soy Bomb ==
For Bob Dylan's performance of "Love Sick" at the 1998 Grammy Awards, Portnoy was hired by Dylan's production company to stand in the background with other dancers and groove to the music to "give Bob a good vibe". Instead, halfway through the performance, Portnoy ripped off his shirt, ran next to Dylan, and started dancing and contorting with the two-word poem "Soy Bomb" written across his chest. When questioned by reporters, Portnoy explained the poem's meaning: "Soy... represents dense nutritional life. Bomb is, obviously, an explosive destructive force. So, soy bomb is what I think art should be: dense, transformational, explosive life" according to Entertainment Weekly and that "he meant Soy Bomb as a 'spontaneous explosion of the self' to re-invigorate the current music scene. He has also said that the phrase is a combination of Spanish and English, meaning "the bomb of 'I am'". The Grammys chose not to press charges against Portnoy for the act, but he was not paid the $200 fee for the gig.

The event was parodied on Saturday Night Live, where he was portrayed by Will Ferrell, and on The Tonight Show with Jay Leno. In 2005, the band Eels included the track "Whatever Happened to Soy Bomb" on the double-disc album Blinking Lights and Other Revelations. In 2016, the TV show Broad City parodied Soy Bomb with a performance artist character played by musician Har Mar Superstar.

== Portnoy: 1999–present ==
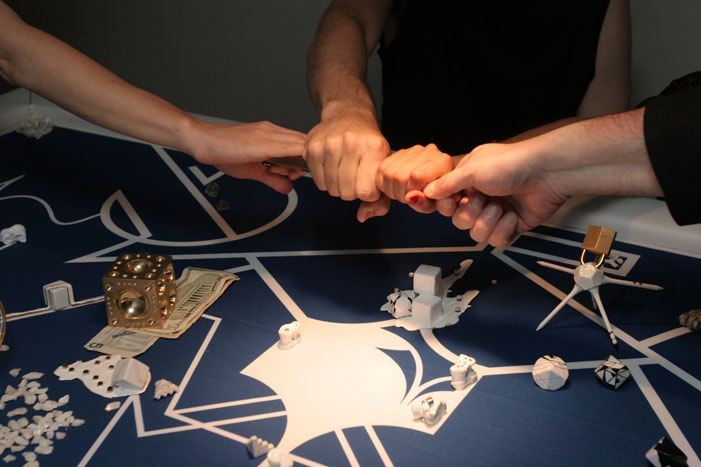
Michael Portnoy's TALUS abstract gambling table, 2007

Portnoy expanded his practice to include choreography, video, installation, sculpture, painting, participatory works and curation. His projects have included Google Office 0.2, a project for the 2010 Taipei Biennial that involved the formation of a think tank called The Improvement League, which operated by improving existing artworks in the Biennial by pruning and hybridizing in a cross between futurology and conceptual horticulture. Portnoy's long-standing investigation of social exchange, and the rules of communication and play, has been conducted through a series of 'abstract gambling' tables for Casino Ilinx (2008) and Filzzungeungewiss (2009); and conversation or inventional games drawing on 17th-century universal or taxonomic languages for Fran Spafa Feda (2010); and the game-show format of 27 Gnosis (2012).

== Relational Stalinism ==
Michael Portnoy, 27 Gnosis, 2012, dOCUMENTA (13)

Central to many of Portnoy's projects is his tongue-in-cheek concept of 'Relational Stalinism', a form of relational aesthetics that works against "the fashionable promise that an artwork might offer a democratic magic, transforming inter-relational codes into something nicer..." Unlike other artists who produce participatory artworks, Portnoy undermines the creation of a harmonious community by setting as many limitations as possible on the participants and then introducing destabilizing mechanisms, such as changing the rules in the middle of the game. This breed of absurdist, dictatorial interaction with participants is "a clarification of the artist's imperious role as producer and performer". Contrary to many contemporary participatory events, these schemes value confusion, complication, and ambiguity over predictable outcomes, and the goal is to stretch and dislocate the participants by complicating their behavior and language in the service of riotous invention. By acting as the "Director of Behavior" and constantly modifying the standards of the game, Portnoy forces the participants to construct unexpected worlds and new modes of communication.

== Experimental comedy ==
Much of Portnoy's work is also framed by what he calls experimental comedy, or "the injection of the sublime, the blatantly inscrutable, the abstract, the primal, the choreographic, the theoretical, the improbable, the generative, the post-rhythmic, the turbo-stupid, etc., into the frame of stand-up". This has been manifested in the operatic stand-up routine of The K Sound (2006), Taipei Women's Experimental Comedy Club (2010), and Script Opposition in Late-Model Carrot Jokes (2011), a project that investigated the "carrot joke", a term used in cognitive linguistics to describe a poem-like joke with a high degree of ambiguity, blunt omissions of information and logical faults and inconsistencies. In carrot jokes "incongruities are rarely resolved and just pile on top of each other ... Since the ground or 'script' is always shifting, the listener keeps trying to determine whether there is an overall story that could explain what the hell is going on".

== Progressive Touch ==
Progressive Touch (2020) is a choreographic short film in which Portnoy reimagines sex as rhythmic and formal experimentation, staging three intimate vignettes whose explicit movements are synchronized to shifting, irregular musical structures and infused with elements of slapstick physical comedy. Writing in The Guardian, critic Adrian Searle described the film as "a bizarre, improved vision of sex," noting its highly stylized, choreographed approach to intimacy.

== The Fifth Place ==
The Fifth Place (2023–) is an invitation-only social space in New York City for experimental interaction, in which Portnoy orchestrates clandestine gatherings where participants follow engineered rules of communication and behavior to explore alternate modes of relation.

== Selected exhibitions and performances ==
He has presented work internationally in venues including: dOCUMENTA (13), The 11th Baltic Triennial (as co-curator), Centre Pompidou, The Taipei Biennial 2010, Performa Biennial 07, 09 & 11, SculptureCenter, The Kitchen, de Appel (Amsterdam), P.S.1 Contemporary Art Center, Art Unlimited Basel, Kunsthalle Basel, Objectif Exhibitions (Antwerp), Wilfried Lentz (Rotterdam), IBID PROJECTS (London), Elizabeth Foundation for the Arts Gallery, Deitch Gallery, Roulette, Kling & Bang (Reykjavík), Foksal Gallery Foundation (Warsaw), Kaaitheater (Brussels), Beursschouwburg (Brussels), Migros Museum (Zürich), Le Comfort Moderne (Poitiers, France) and The National Review of Live Art (Glasgow).
