= Ann Lislegaard =

Norwegian artist (born 1962)

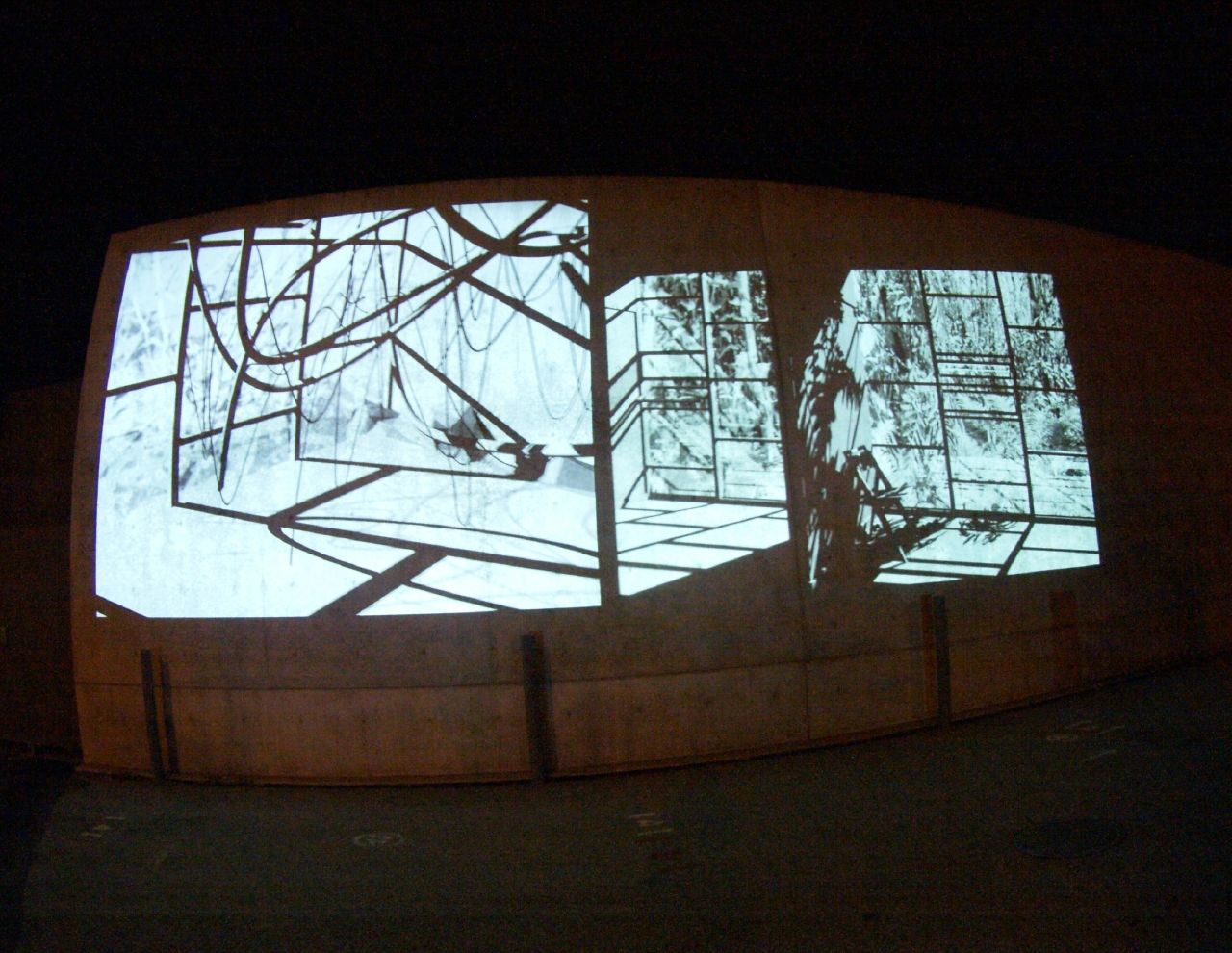
Crystal World, 2006. Installation shot. Ann Lislegaard

Ann Lislegaard (born 1962 in Norway) is a contemporary artist living and working in Copenhagen, Denmark and New York City, US. She is known for her 3D film animations and sound-light installations often departing from ideas found in science fiction. Through the genre of science fiction, she finds an alternative approach to language, narration, gender roles and concepts of the future.

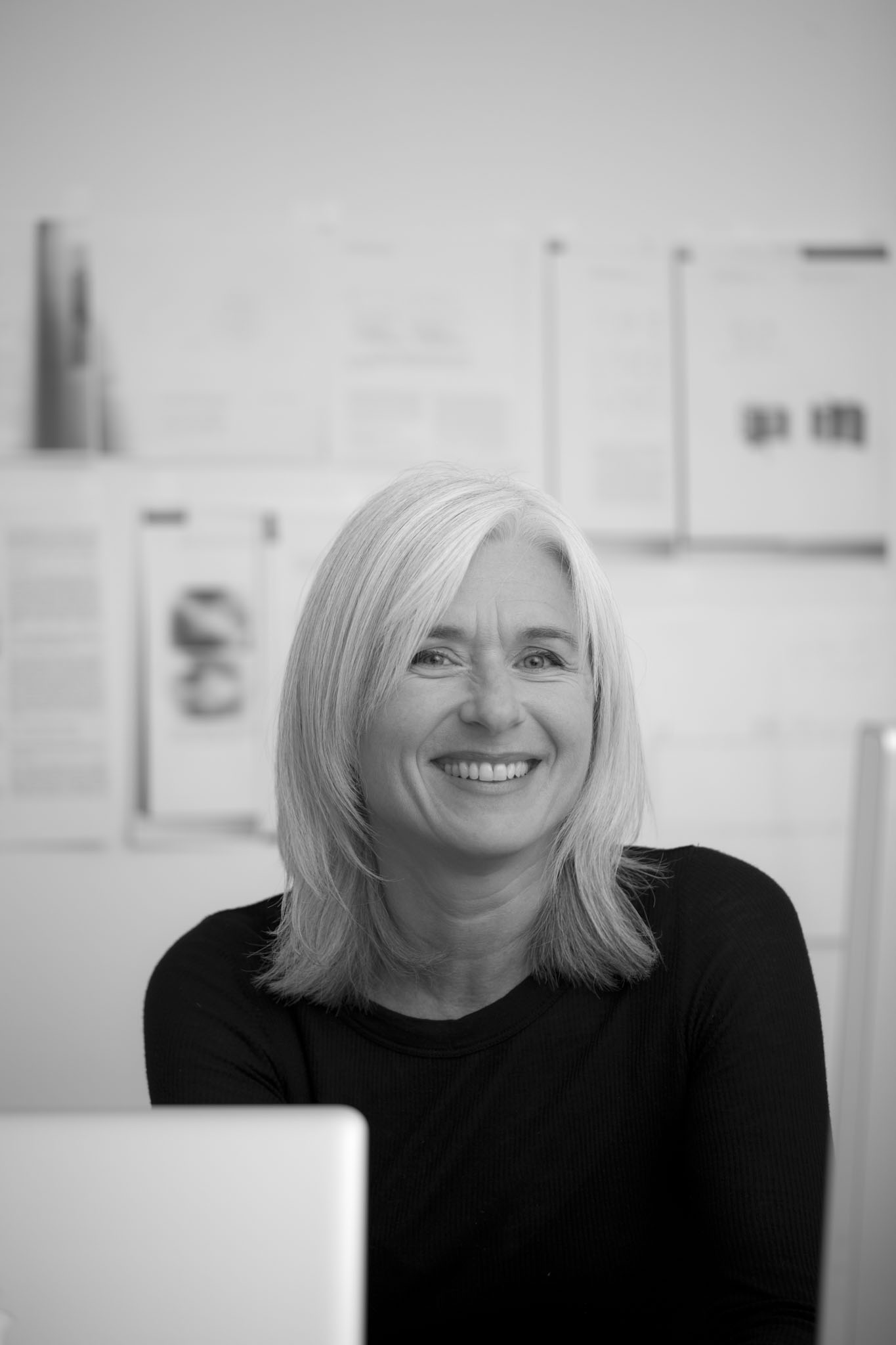
Portrait of Ann Lislegaard. Photo Anders Sune Berg

== Solo exhibitions selected ==
2015

- Paraspace, Tel Aviv Museum of Art, Tel Aviv, Israel

2014

- Oracles, Owls…some animals never sleep, Murray Guy Gallery, New York, NY, US

2012

- Speaking in Tongues, Paul Andriesse Gallery, Amsterdam, the Netherlands

2011

- Time Machine, Murray Guy Gallery, New York, NY, US

2010

- Tapping of the Fox Sisters, Marabouparken – Contemporary Art Center, Sundbyberg/Stockholm, Sweden

2009

- What if, MOCAD – Museum of Contemporary Art Detroit, Detroit, MI, US
- 2062, The Henry Art Museum, Seattle, WA, US
- Ann Lislegaard (solo with Ultra Red, Thomas Bayrle), Raven Row, London, UK

2008

- Science Fiction, Paul Andriesse Gallery, Amsterdam, the Netherlands
- Left Hand of Darkness, Murray Guy Gallery, New York, NY, US

2007

- Science Fiction and Other Worlds, Astrup Fearnley Museum of Modern Art, Oslo, Norway
- The Crystal World, X-rummet, Statens Museum for Kunst, Copenhagen, Denmark
- Art–Unlimited, Ann Lislegaard, Paul Andriesse Gallery at Art Basel, Basel, Switzerland

2006

- Ann Lislegaard, NCA – Nichido Contemporary Art, Tokyo, Japan
- Ann Lislegaard, Paul Andriesse Gallery, Amsterdam, the Netherlands
- Ann Lislegaard, Esbjerg Kunstmuseum, Esbjerg, Denmark

2005

- 51st Venice Biennale, Danish Pavilion (with Peter Land, Joachim Koester, Gitte Villesen, Eva Koch), Venice, Italy
- Bellona, Murray Guy Gallery, New York, NY, US
- Kunstpassagen, Astrup Fearnly Museet, Oslo, Norway

2004

- Sonic Construction, Aldrich Museum of Contemporary Art, Ridgefield, CT, US

2003

- Ann Lislegaard, Galleria Raucci e Santamaria, Naples, Italy
- Ann Lislegaard, Murray Guy Gallery, New York, NY, US
- Art-Unlimited, Ann Lislegaard, Paul Andriesse Gallery at Art Basel, Basel, Switzerland

2002

- Ann Lislegaard, Paul Andriesse Gallery, Amsterdam, the Netherlands
- Ann Lislegaard, Esbjerg Kunstmuseum, Esbjerg, Denmark
- Eyes Wide Open, National Museum of Photography, Copenhagen, Denmark
- The Space Between Us, Dundee Contemporary Arts, Dundee, Scotland
- Empty, the room seems large to me, Arthouse, Dublin, Ireland

2001

- Slowly Spinning, Kunstnernes Hus, Oslo, Norway

2000

- Corner Piece – The Space Between Us, Galleria Raucci e Santamaria, Naples, Italy
- Lige med et blev alt anderledes, The Children's Reading Room, Louisiana Museum of Modern Art, Denmark
- I-You-Later-There, Galleri Tommy Lund, Copenhagen, Denmark
- Ann Lislegaard, Huis A/D Werf, Utrecht, The Netherlands
- Ann Lislegaard, Kunstpanorama, Luzern, Switzerland

1999

- Double Room, Moderna Museet Project, Stockholm, Sweden
- Transparent Walls, Paul Andriesse Gallery, Amsterdam, the Netherlands

1998

- Bicycle Thieves, Crown Gallery, Chicago, IL, US

1997

- Blind Date (with Olaf Nicolai), Luthringer Strasse, Munich, Germany
- Nothing But Space, Galleri Tommy Lund, Odense, Denmark

1995

- Ann Lislegaard, Schaper Sundberg Galleri, Stockholm, Sweden
- Ann Lislegaard, Galleri Tommy Lund, Odense, Denmark
- Ann Lislegaard, LXX, Aarhus, Denmark
- Ann Lislegaard, Galleri Struds, Oslo, Norway

1994

- Liberty Bells, Lageret, Kunstforeningen Gl. Strand, Copenhagen, Denmark

1992

- A Touch of Fear, Galleri Basilisk, Copenhagen, Denmark

== Recent group exhibitions (selected) ==
2015

- PARASOPHIA, Kyoto International Festival of Contemporary Culture, Kyoto, Japan
- Beam me up!, Kristianstads Konsthall, Kristianstad, Sweden
- 15 favoritter fra samlingen, KØS Museum of Art in Public Spaces, Køge, Denmark
- I hear your voice reflected in a glass and it sounds like it is inside of me, curated by Emily Wardill in conversation with Jesi Khadivi, Carlier Gebauer, Berlin, Germany
- Voyage to the Virtuel, Scandinavia House, New York, NY, US
- Kvartet, Esbjerg Kunstmuseum, Esbjerg, Denmark
- Kvinder, Horsens Kunstmuseum, Horsens, Denmark

2014

- You Imagine What You Desire, 19th Biennale of Sydney, Sydney, Australia
- L’avenir, La Biennale de Montréal 2014, Montreal, Canada
- Magnus, Scènes de l'imaginaire automate, Mamco, Geneva, Switzerland
- Re:visited, Latvian Center of Contemporary Art, Riga 2014 – European Culture Capital, Riga, Latvia

2013

- 12e Biennale de Lyon, Musée d’Art Contemporain, Lyon, France
- Seismology, Palais De Tokyo, Paris, France
- Approximately Infinite Universe, MCASD, San Diego, CA, US
- Malmö Art Museum @ Malmö Konsthall, Malmö Konsthall, Malmö, Sweden
- The Beginning Is Always Today (Bob Smith projects), SKMU – Sørlandets Kunstmuseum, Kristiansand, Norway
- Et rum med udsigt (Bob Smith projects), Rønnebæksholm, Næstved, Denmark
- 24 Spaces A Cacophony, Malmø Konsthall, Sweden
- Distinguished from the melee of user comments and structurally misogynist chat rooms harbouring rapid-fire trolls, Skt. Gertruds, Malmø, Sweden
- Contemporary #2, Museet for Samtidskunst, Roskilde, Denmark

2012

- Narrative Arc, GUAG – Griffith University Art Gallery, Queensland College of Art, Brisbane, Australia
- Theater of the World, Museum of Old and New Art, Berriedale, Tasmania
- Beyond Good and Evil, Den Frie, The Copenhagen Art Festival, Copenhagen, Denmark
- Dexter, Bang, Sinister, Research Program, Charlottenborg Kunsthal, Copenhagen, Denmark
- Overgaden at The Armory Show, Armory, New York, NY, US

2011

- Imagine Being Here Now, The 6th Momentum Biennial, Moss, Norway
- The Smithson Effect, Utah Museum of Fine Arts, University of Utah, UT, US
- The Man Without Qualities | L’uomo senza qualita, Teatro Margherita, Bari, Italy
- Assim é, se lhe parece, Museu da Imagem e do Som, Paço das Artes, São Paulo, Brazil
- VideoSpace, Astrup Fearnley Collection, Oslo, Norway
- The Passenger, Paul Andriesse Gallery, Amsterdam, the Netherlands
- Contemporary #1, Museet for Samtidskunst, Roskilde, Denmark

2010

- Power Games, Ludwig Museum - Museum of Contemporary Art, Budapest, Hungary
- Busan Biennale, Busan Museum of Art, Busan, South Korea
- Wall of Sound, Te Tuhi Centre for the Arts, Auckland, New Zealand
- Polis, Polis, Potatismos - Utställning om ett brott, Malmö Konsthall, Malmö, Sweden
- Handlinger – Performance og lydkunst, Museet for Samtidskunst, Roskilde, Denmark
- Pastiche 2010, VAK, Jyderup, Denmark
- Connexions, Esbjerg Kunstmuseum, Esbjerg, Denmark

2009

- Automatic Cities, Museum of Contemporary Art San Diego, San Diego, US
- Euphoria Left the Room, Scion, Los Angeles, CA, US
- Entr'acte, Kukje Gallery, Seoul, Korea
- Dream, Statens Museum for Kunst, Copenhagen, DK
- Rotating Views – Astrup Fearnley Collection, Astrup Fearnly Museum of Modern Art, Oslo, Norway
- Nyerhvervelser 2007-2008, Louisiana Museum of Modern Art, Denmark
- Retreat, UNStudio, Fort Aspen, the Netherlands
- Das Gespinst, Museum Abteiberg, Mönchengladbach, Germany
- Until the End of the World, AMP, Athens, Greece
- Helsingborg og Malmö – 22 Major Works From the Collection of Malmö Art Museum, Dunkers Kulturhus, Helsingborg, Sweden
- In the search of the Unknown, Montevideo, Amsterdam, the Netherlands
- Cut & Paste, Susanne Ottesen Galleri, Copenhagen, Denmark

2008

- The Cinematic or Moving Images Expanded: Artists’ Film and Video Showcase 2008, Insa Art Space Seoul, Korea
- Modern Ruin, Queensland Art Gallery, Brisbane, Australia
- The Future as Disruption, The Kitchen, New York, NY, US
- JG Ballard. An Autopsy of the New Millennium, Centre de Cultura Contemporània de Barcelona, Spain
- Reality Check, Statens Museum for Kunst, Copenhagen, Denmark
- U-Turn Quadrennial for Contemporary Art, Carlsberg Garden, Copenhagen, Denmark
- Re-Enactments, DHC/ART (Foundation For Contemporary Art), Montréal, Canada
- The Light Project, Pulitzer Arts Foundation, St. Louis, MO, US
- In the Space of Elsewhere, Stanley Picker Gallery, Kingston University, London, UK
- The Map is not the Territory, Esbjerg Kunstmuseum, Esbjerg, Denmark
- Danskjävlar - a Swedish Declaration of Love, Kunsthal Charlottenborg, Copenhagen, Denmark
- Auricula, Krabbesholm Højskole, Denmark
- AUX, Planetariet, Copenhagen, Denmark

2007

- Off Screen, Montevideo, Amsterdam, the Netherlands
- Animated Painting, San Diego Museum of Art, San Diego, CA, US, travelling to: 2009 Faulconer Gallery, Grinnell College, Grinnell, IA, US; 2009 El Cubo at Centro Cultural Tijuana, Mexico
- Mind the Gap, Fabrikken, Copenhagen, Denmark
- V-effekten, Kunsthal Nikolaj, Copenhagen, Denmark
- space.gaze.desire, Den Frie, Copenhagen, Denmark
- LARM - From Myth Cavity to Laptop, Moderna Museet, Stockholm, Sweden

2006

- Como viver junto (How to live together), 27th Bienal de São Paulo, São Paulo, Brazil
- Contos Dixitais/Digital Tales, CGAC, Santiago de Compostela, Spain
- Realitātes arheoloģija (Archaeology of Reality), Andrejsala, Riga, Vilnius
- A BRIGHTER DAY, James Cohan Gallery, New York, NY, US
- News: Recent Acquisitions in Contemporary Art, The Israel Museum, Jerusalem, Israel
- El Espacio Interior, Exhibition Room Alcalá 31, Madrid, Spain
- Mission: Reality, Museet for Samtidskunst, Roskilde, Denmark
- Places where Immaterials can be Obtained, Paul Andriesse Gallery, Amsterdam, the Netherlands
- Det Reale og Det Fantastiske, Den Frie, Copenhagen, Denmark
- Other Voices, Other Rooms, Contemporary Art from the Frac Collection, The Israel Museum, Jerusalem, Israel

2005

- Ecstasy: In and About Altered States, The Museum of Contemporary Art, Los Angeles, CA, US
- More than this – Negotiating Realities, Göteborgs International Biennial for Contemporary Art, Göteborg, Sweden

== Recognition ==
Winning an Eckersberg Medal 2015

== Commissions (selected) ==
- 2014 111 White Plateaus, KØS - Museum of Art in Public Spaces, Køge, Denmark
- 2009 Passage, Christies Gate, Moss, Norway

== Collections (selected) ==
Louisiana Museum of Modern Art, Humlebæk, Denmark, MONA, Tasmania, Australia, The Solomon R. Guggenheim Museum, New York, NY, US, Museet for Samtidskunst, Roskilde, Denmark, Astrup Fearnley Museet for Moderne Kunst, Oslo, Norway, Frac Languedoc-Roussillon, Montpellier, France, The Israel Museum, Jerusalem, Israel, Museo Nacional Centro de Arte Reina Sofía, Madrid, Spain, MOCAD - Museum of Contemporary Art San Diego, San Diego, CA, US, National Museum of Women in the Arts, Washington, DC, US, Statens Museum for Kunst, Copenhagen, Denmark, Esbjerg Kunstmuseum, Esbjerg, Denmark

== Publications ==
- Spiral Book. Texts by Ann Lislegaard, Lars Bang Larsen, David Velasco, Donna J. Haraway, and Ursula K. Le Guin. Motto distribution
