= Pirotte =

Pirotte is a Belgian surname. Notable people with the surname include:

- Gaspard Pirotte, Belgian gymnast
- Gautier Pirotte (born 1973), Belgian sociologist
- Jean-Claude Pirotte (1939–2014), Belgian writer, painter and poet
- Julia Pirotte (1907–2000), Polish photojournalist
- Nestor Pirotte (1933–2000), Belgian serial killer
- Roger Pirotte (1910–?), Belgian cyclist
