= Rosalind Nashashibi =

English artist (born 1973)

- Born: 1973 (age 52–53); Croydon
- Education: Glasgow School of Art
- Occupation: Artist

Layla Rosalind Nashashibi (born 1973) is a Palestinian-English artist based in London. Nashashibi works mainly with 16 mm film but also makes paintings and prints. Her work often deals with everyday observations merged with mythological elements, considering the relationships and moments between community and extended family.

== Early life and education ==
Nashashibi was born in 1973 to a Palestinian father and Northern Irish mother, in Croydon, a large town in South London. She received a Bachelor of Fine Arts in Fine Art from Sheffield Hallam University, South Yorkshire, United Kingdom in 1995. She completed a Master of Fine Arts degree at The Glasgow School of Art in 2000. During this time she spent three months in CalArts, California, as part of a masters exchange program.

== Work ==
Much of Nashashibi's work consists of films of everyday life in urban environments. She works mainly with 16 mm film as well as photography, print and painting. Her films often use various narrative techniques in order to link staged scenes with imagery of real life.

Abbeys (2006) comprises a series of four black and white photographs that each depicts an upside-down view of an abbey's archway that when flipped as such reveals an anthropomorphic face. The uncanny images are based on photos Nashashibi found in an old photograph album.

The State of Things is a black-and-white film of old ladies at a Salvation Army jumble sale in Glasgow with a love song by the Egyptian singer Umm Kulthum on the soundtrack. The exact location of the film is unclear, and Nashashibi has said that many people, when first seeing the grainy footage, assume the women to be from some non-British culture or from an earlier time.

Dahiet a Bareed, District of the Post Office was filmed in the West Bank in an area designed by the artist's grandfather. The film is about people playing football, having their hair cut and so on. Midwest and Midwest Field depict life in Omaha, Nebraska.

She works collaboratively with artist Lucy Skaer under the name Nashashibi/Skaer. Meeting in Glasgow, they began working together in 2005 when they made their first joint work called The Ambassador, a two-screen video about the British Consul General in Hong Kong. They have continued to collaborate alongside their individual practices, most often making 16mm films together, to explore shared interests through film and exhibition making including female representation and global cultures. Their joint work has been exhibited widely internationally.

In 2019 Nashashibi became the first artist in residence at the National Gallery, London, in a new residency scheme linked to its Modern and contemporary art programme. The year-long residency includes working in the gallery's onsite studio, receipt of an award to fund her work for the year, access to the gallery's collections and research, and culminates in an exhibition and publication of work.

In 2017 she was nominated for the Turner Prize, exhibiting work in the Turner prize exhibition in the Ferens Gallery in Hull alongside the three other nominees. She exhibited the two films she was nominated for; Vivian's Garden (2017) and Electrical Gaza (2015). The work Vivian's Garden was previously presented at Documenta 14, which focuses on the relationship between and daily life of mother and daughter artists Vivian Suter and Elisabeth Wild at their home in Guatemala. Electrical Gaza was commissioned by the Imperial War Museum, and combines real film footage with animation to depict the mixing of daily life in Gaza and the complex charged atmosphere of the place.

In 2022 she was appointed as an artist trustee of Tate by the prime minister for a four-year term.

== Awards ==
- 2003: Won the Beck's Futures prize, the first woman to do so, for The State of Things.
- 2006: Decibel award recipient.
- 2013: Shortlisted artist for the Northern Art Prize.
- 2014: Paul Hamlyn Foundation Award.
- 2017: nominated for the Turner Prize for a piece of work that was made collaboratively with her daughter, Pauline Manacorda.

== Exhibitions ==
- Bachelor Machines Part 1, Chisenhale Gallery, London, 2007
- Carlo’s Vision, Body Habits, Nomas Foundation, Rome, 2011
- The Painter and The Delivery Man, Objectif Exhibitions, Antwerp, 2013
- Electrical Gaza, Imperial War Museum, London, 2015
- Two Tribes, Murray Guy, New York, 2016
- Rosalind Nashashibi: Vivian’s Garden, The Art Institute of Chicago, Chicago, 2018
- Rosalind Nashashibi, a solo exhibition, Witte de With Center for Contemporary Art, Rotterdam, 2018
- DEEP REDDER, Secession, Vienna, 2019
- An Overflow of Passion and Sentiment, National Gallery, London, 2020

== Collections ==
- Tate
- British Council
- National Galleries Scotland
- The Metropolitan Museum of Art, New York
- Art Institute Chicago
- The Museum of Modern Art, New York
