= Murray Guy =

Former art gallery

Coordinates: 40.74397°N 74.00618°W

Murray Guy was a contemporary art gallery specializing in emerging and mid-career contemporary artists. Founded by Margaret Murray and Janice Guy in 1998, the gallery was located in the Chelsea, Manhattan gallery district at 453 West 17th Street. It closed in early 2017 after eighteen years in business.

The gallery covered contemporary photography, video, film, sculpture, and painting.

== Founders ==
Margaret Murray and Janice Guy. Janice Guy (born 1953 in London, UK) a photographer, produced much of her work while studying with Klaus Rinke and Bernd and Hilla Becher at the Kunstakademie Düsseldorf in Düsseldorf, Germany, during the 1970s.. Guy abandoned art-making in the early 1980s, however her photographs re-emerged in 2007 and have been shown in solo exhibitions at White Columns, New York (2008), The Apartment, Vancouver (2008 and 2013), Cleopatra's, New York (2015) and Higher Pictures, New York (2019).

== Artists ==
Among the artists who exhibited at Murray Guy were the following:

- Matthew Buckingham.
- Leidy Churchman
- Moyra Davey
- Matthew Higgs
- An-My Lê
- Zoe Leonard
- Rosalind Nashashibi
- Barbara Probst
- Lucy Skaer
- Ann Lislegaard
- Kota Ezawa
- Patricia Esquivias
