= Lucy Skaer =

English artist

Lucy Skaer (born 1975) is a contemporary English artist who works with sculpture, film, painting, and drawing. Her work has been exhibited internationally. Skaer is a member of the Henry VIII’s Wives artist collective, and has exhibited a number of works with the group.

She currently lives and works in on the Isle of Lewis, Scotland. .

== Early life and education ==
Skaer was born in Cambridge. She studied Fine Art at Glasgow School of Art.

== Work ==
Lucy Skaer's works often depicts relationships between abstraction and the direct material nature of objects. Many of her works are replicas of historical objects which are translated and re-contextualized in new mediums. Skaer's work has had a particularly strong engagement with images and historical objects depicting archaeology, ecology, the English landscape, British Empire, and Neolithic architecture as her 2008 installation, The Siege.

Much of Skaer's work also consists of objects which interact with and change public spaces. In one piece, she took up a paving stone on Glasgow's Buchanan Street and then had the Earl of Glasgow ceremoniously lay down a replacement, while in an Amsterdam-based piece, she left a diamond and a scorpion side-by-side on a pavement. She has also secretly hidden moth and butterfly pupae in criminal courts in the hope that they will hatch in mid-trial.

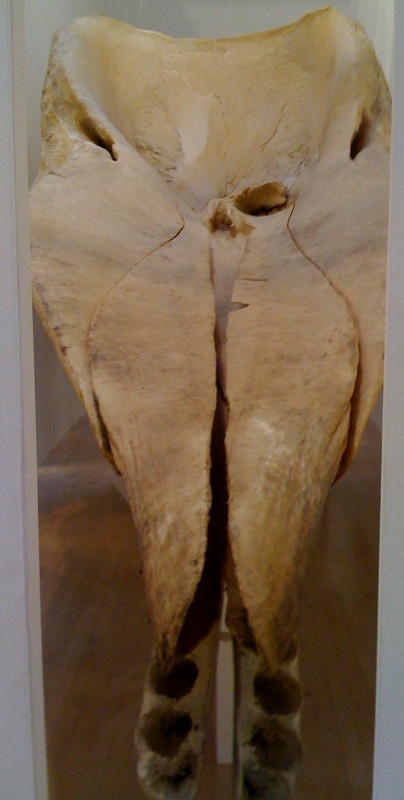
Lucy Skaer Sperm whale skull from 'Leviathan Edge' shown at Tate Britain

In 2003, Skaer was shortlisted for the Beck's Futures prize. In 2008, Skaer was the subject of a retrospective of her works since 2001 at the Fruitmarket Gallery in Edinburgh, Scotland which included newly commissioned work, and a comprehensive monograph book was published to accompany the show. In April 2009, Skaer was shortlisted for the prestigious Turner Prize for the sculptures Black Alphabet, (26 slender sculptures made of coal dust in the shape of Constantin Brâncuși's Bird in Space), and Leviathan Edge, an installation which included the skull of a sperm whale, drawings, and sculptures. (She lost out to Glasgow-based artist Richard Wright).

Skaer has made a number of 16mm films with the British artist Rosalind Nashashibi including Flash in the Metropolitan in 2006, which depicts the artifacts and artworks of the Metropolitan Museum of Art in New York as they appeared in a dimmed light of the museum interrupted by the flashes of a strobe. The two have collaborated on the films Our Magnolia and Pygmalion Event, as well as several others.

=== Exhibitions ===
- 52nd Venice Biennale, Scottish Show, 2007
- Fruitmarket Gallery, Edinburgh, 2008
- Turner Prize Exhibition, Finalist, 2009
- "A Boat Used As A Vessel", Kunsthalle Basel, Basel, Switzerland, April 2009 – June 2009.
- "Rachael, Peter, Caitlin, John." Location One, New York, 2010.
- Rosalind Nashashibi/ Skaer, (collaborative films) Murray Guy, 2010
- "Reanimation. Nashashibi/Skaer." Carnegie Museum of Art, Pittsburgh, PA, 2010.
- The Centre Pompidou, 2010.
- "Film for an Abandoned Projector." Leeds, UK, 2011.
- "Harlequin is as Harlequin Does." Murray Guy, New York, 2012.
- "Scene, Hold, Ballast," SculptureCenter, New York, 2012.
- "Flash in the Metropolitan", Metropolitan Museum of Art, New York, 2012.
- "Lucy Skaer," Mount Stuart House, Scotland, June–Oct 2013.
- "Lucy Skaer," Yale Union, Portland, OR, July–September 2013.
- "Lucy Skaer, Available Fonts", KW, Berlin, October 2017 – January 2018.
- "Lucy Skaer: The Green Man", Talbot Rice Gallery, Edinburgh, 26 July – 6 October 2018.

== General references ==
- Vitamin D: New perspectives in drawing. London: Phaidon. 2005. (pgs on Lucy Skaer)
- Interview for "Rachael, Peter, Caitlin, John." Location One, NY. 2010.
