= Frank Chu =

American conspiracy theorist

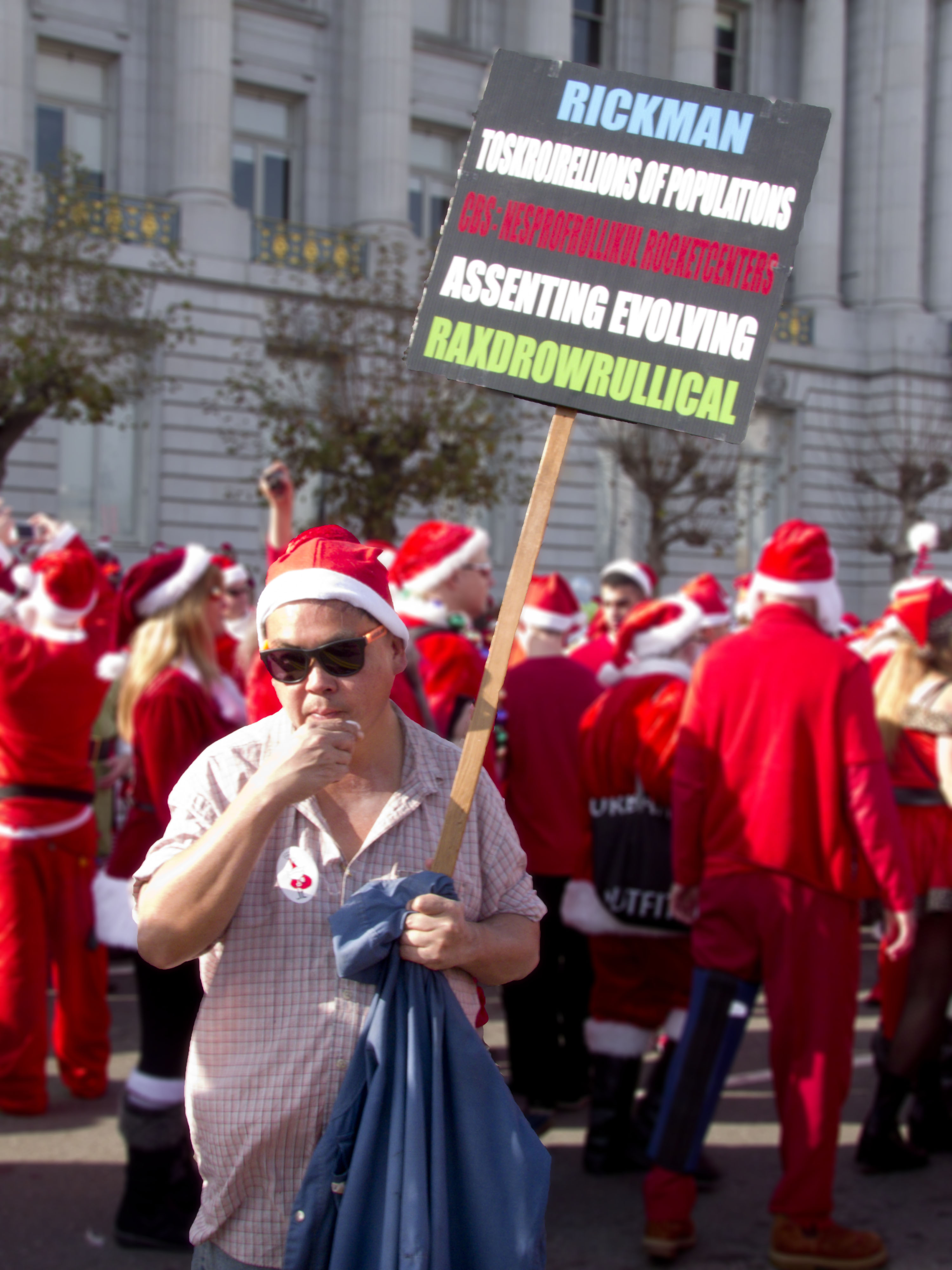
- Chu at SantaCon 2011.
- Born: March 24, 1960 (age 66); San Francisco, California, U.S.
- Occupation: Professional protester
- Years active: ~1999 – present

Frank Chu (born March 24, 1960) is an American eccentric and conspiracy theorist. Since at least 1999, Chu has been campaigning to impeach an array of former U.S. Presidents he considers guilty of collaborating with a nefarious network of alien populations called the "12 Galaxies" to film him against his will, to broadcast this footage intergalactically, and to embezzle the royalties he is owed as a television and movie star. Chu lives in Chinatown, Oakland, and commutes daily to San Francisco and nearby locales in order to reach the largest audience of passers-by and television news crews for his street protests about this labor dispute. He produces a new sign weekly and supports himself through sign sponsorships and small donations from his supporters and with help from his family.

== Before his protests ==
Chu is from San Francisco. According to Chu, before he started protesting, he worked as an accountant, attended UC Berkeley, and earned an associate degree in business administration from California State University, Hayward.

== Performance/protest technique ==
Frank Chu protests daily, or nearly daily, typically walking throughout the daytime hours in downtown San Francisco (particularly along Market Street and Montgomery Street) holding one of his serial protest signs, on which he displays codified rows of text in his characteristic lexicon. He does not shout or cause a noisy disturbance. He always wears wrap-around sunglasses, often wears a suit and tie, or a sports coat and dress shirt. If engaged, Chu supplements the public presentation of his signs with spoken remarks about their terminology, about his campaign to reveal his exploitation as an intergalactic television and movie star and to be compensated financially, and about his recent news coverage.

Although the form of Chu's actions is that of a picket-sign-carrying protester, it is misunderstood if interpreted merely as a protest or picket. He sometimes refers to "a live performance of my protest" rather than simply "my protest".

He occasionally protests elsewhere, for instance in downtown Oakland and at the University of California, Berkeley campus. Chu will deviate from his usual rounds in the pursuit of a larger audience, and he is frequently seen at street fairs and protests. Although he claims to be a Republican himself, he seems equally at home at protest demonstrations representing all shades of political opinion. Occasionally, people who oppose a protest group will single out Chu as an example of the protest group's incoherent message, not realizing that he is not protesting the same issues as the other protesters in the group.

Chu also likes to appear in the news media, and will try to position himself in view of television news cameras and to offer himself to be interviewed. He pays close attention to the local news media scene and keeps tabs on where he has received good coverage. He will depart from his usual parade ground to attend media-magnet events, for instance the Scott Peterson trial, the BALCO grand jury hearings, or the court case deciding on the timing of the 2003 California recall election.

== World view and interests ==
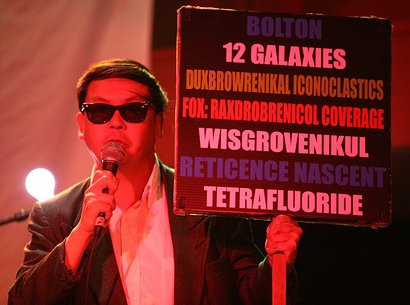
Chu performing at the 12 Galaxies bar in San Francisco

Frank Chu holds Bill Clinton, Grover Cleveland, George W. Bush, Ronald Reagan, and other former U.S. Presidents responsible for working with the populations of the 12 Galaxies and directing the CIA, FBI, Universal Studios, and other agencies and corporations to embezzle royalties owed to him as the star of a television and movie series called "The Richest Family." Chu believes he has starred in the series since childhood, which has been a major success in other galaxies. Yet, because the syndicated series is shot with top-secret invisible cameras and edited weekly, Chu claims he was unaware of it until he received telepathic messages from supportive former Soviet and UN presidents in the mid-1990s. Chu asserts that many of the US presidents responsible are actually duplicates; therefore his protests have frequently called for the impeachment of Clinton even after Clinton was no longer in office. The 12 Galaxies also regularly commits war crimes and treason in this and in other galaxies.

Chu is strongly interested in television reporters and newscasters for their potential in bringing him the publicity he requires to inform the world of the injustices committed against him. He hopes that this wave of publicity will cause a public outcry and lead to more than "$20 billions" in compensation for the damages he and his family have suffered.

The now-closed 12 Galaxies bar in San Francisco was named in honor of Chu's cause. Chu occasionally spoke about his campaign and its coverage on-stage at the 12 Galaxies. His performances had a similar theme to his signs, with riffs off of the twelve galaxies theme and the seemingly abstract use of syllable combinations for poetic effect; to this he added the use of a percussive "ah" syllable at irregular intervals between words, superficially similar to the "uh" speech disfluency or discourse marker seen in ordinary conversation but with a more constant tone and duration.

Chu always goes to church on Sunday.

== Sign sponsorships ==
Chu has been sponsored by the likes of Laughing Squid, Harputs adidas/Y3, Learn iT!, DoctorBase, a Quiznos Sub restaurant, Rasputin Music, Chris Daly's 2006 San Francisco Supervisor campaign, Phil Angelides' 2006 California gubernatorial campaign, and Expensify — typically through ad-space purchased on the back of his signs. As of May, 2005, his going rate was $100 (U.S.) per week.

== Sign texts ==
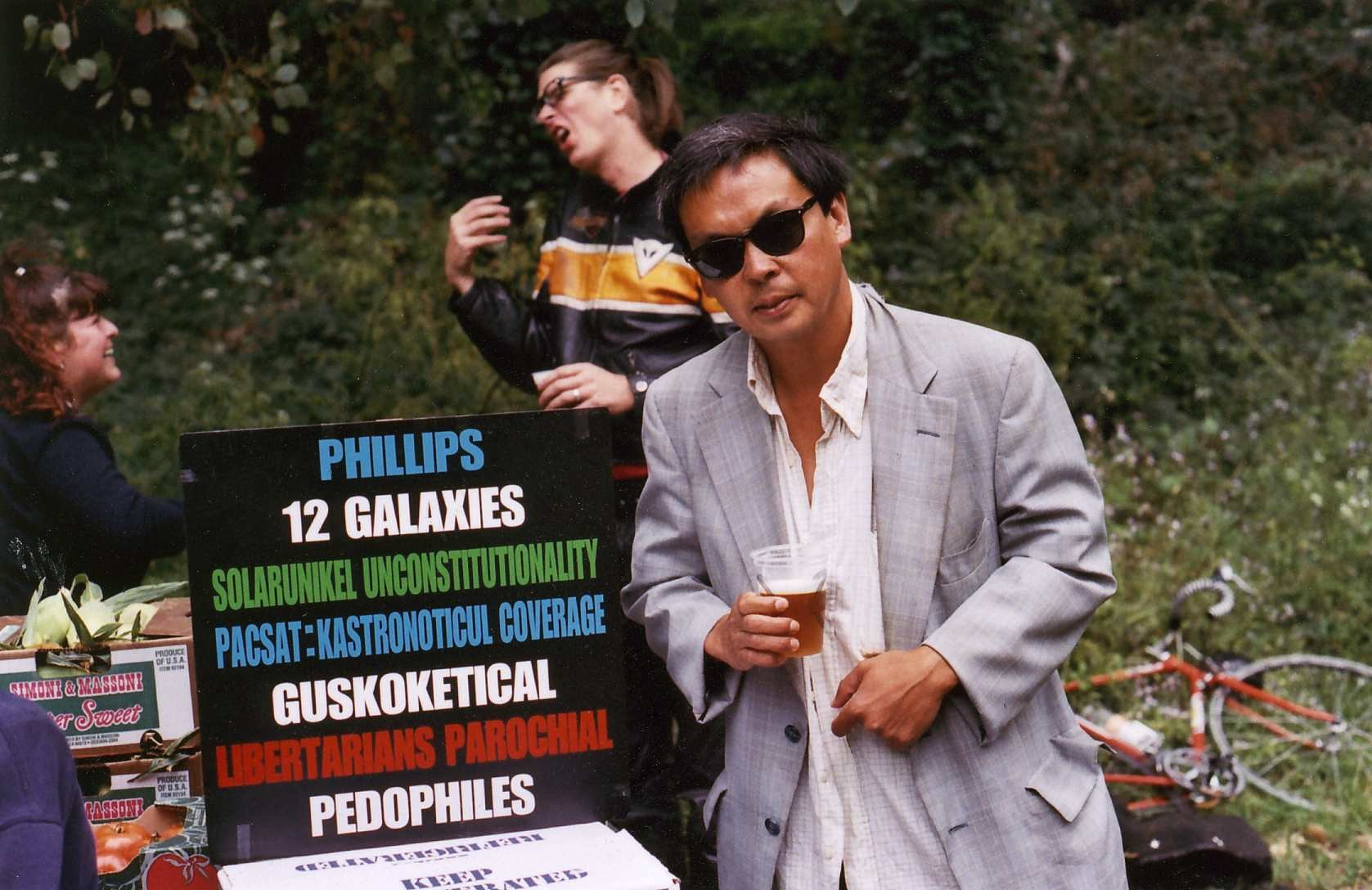
Chu at the 2004 Independence Day messenger barbecue

Chu uses colored all caps text for his signs. His signs change from day to day, and tend to go through syntactically similar phases, with the phrase "12 Galaxies" (these are only the guilty galaxies) being his trademark and a constant presence in the signs. In June 2007, Chu broke from this tradition and started replacing this with "85 Galaxies", "130 Galaxies", and "800 Galaxies". At the 2007 Castro Halloween Party, Chu's sign claimed "7,645,000 Galaxies", at MacWorld 2008 he was up to 75,850,000, at the Iraq War protest on March 19, 2008, he was up to 8,685,000,000, and 785,249,000,000,000 by June 21, 2008.

In his current signs, Chu has replaced "galaxies" with "populations" and lists figures which surpass any normal accounting; he had reached "DESKROTHULLIONS OF POPULATIONS" by 2011, for example, and "VITGROROLLIONS OF POPULATIONS" by 2012.

The earliest of the photos of Chu's signs show his "classic" phase, in which the signs typically read "IMPEACH [figure] 12 Galaxies Guiltied to a [modifier] Rocket Society", where [figure] was typically a living or dead former U.S. president, and [modifier] was something along the lines of "Zegnatronic", "Omegalogical", etc. The very earliest examples are handwritten, for instance:

Impeach
Clinton
12 Galaxies
Guiltied to a
Dectrological
Rocket Society

Later versions:

Impeach
Clinton
12 Galaxies
Guiltied to a
Zegnatronic
Rocket Society

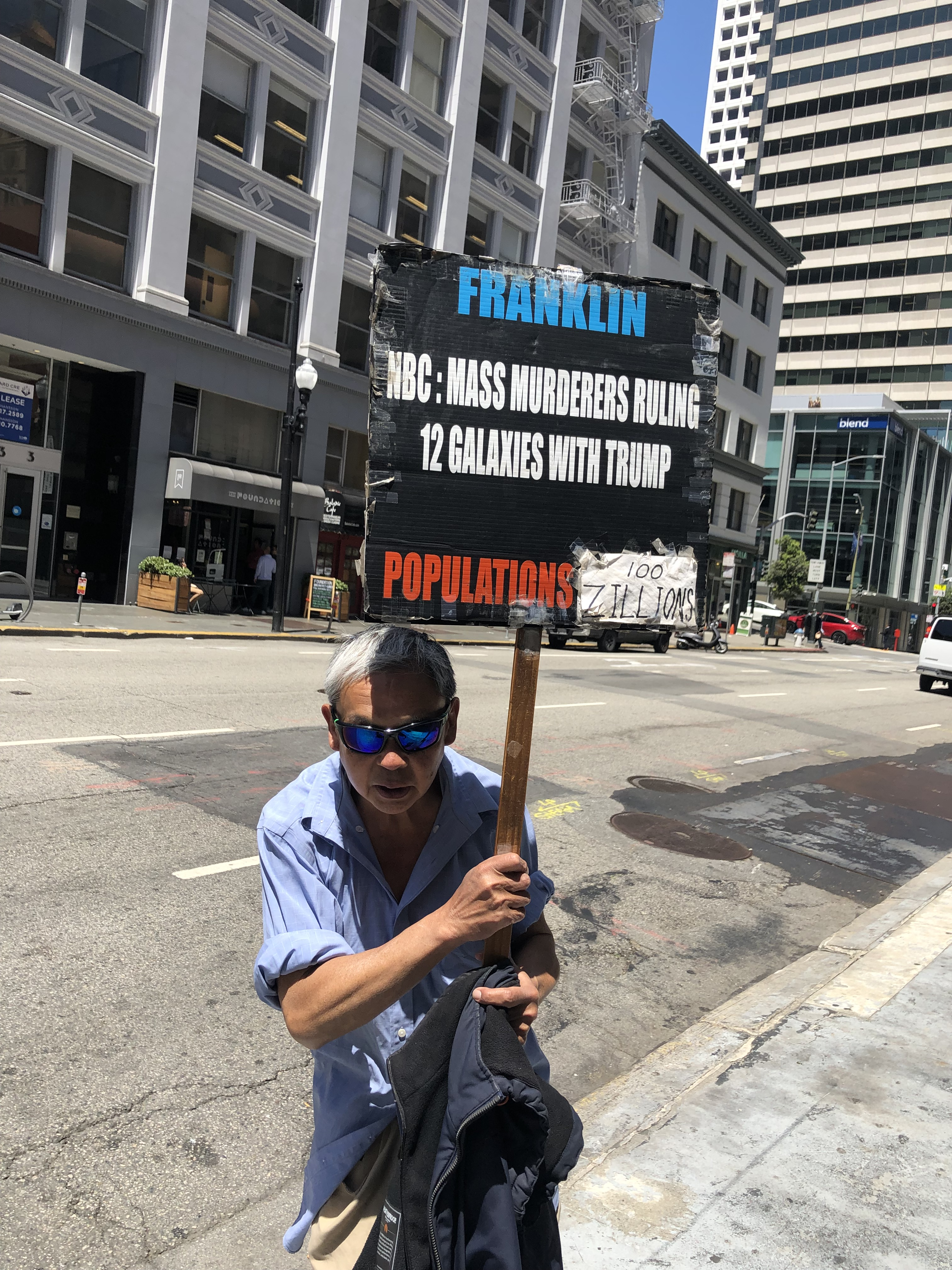
Frank Chu with updated sign May 2022 near Kearny and Pine

At some point prior to May 17, 2022, Frank Chu began to include Donald Trump among the former presidents mentioned in his grievances and combines "galaxies" and "populations" in the same sign. In addition to the customary all caps colored block lettering, Frank Chu has also taken to augmenting his signs with handwritten updates.

== Exhibitions ==
Frank Chu has exhibited his serial protest signs in exhibitions, including "Frank Chu" at the Planetarium in Vilnius, Lithuania (2014); "Portable Holes", which took place in the San Francisco Pavilion during the 9th Shanghai Biennale, Shanghai, China (2012); "Sõida tasa üle silla (Ride gently over the bridge)" at Galerii Noorus during the ART IST KUKU NU UT Festival in Tartu, Estonia (2012); and "Psymulation: Reenactments of the Present" at Photo Epicenter in San Francisco, US (2008). His work was the subject of "Jretdrostrenikal Exhibitions", an exhibition at Objectif Exhibitions, in Antwerp, Belgium.

== Awards ==
Frank Chu has received the following awards:

- 2000 "Best Protester", San Francisco Bay Guardian.
- 2007 "Best Pathological Citizen", SF Weekly.
