= Danish pavilion =

Venice Biennale national pavilion

Coordinates: 45.4288°N 12.3579°E

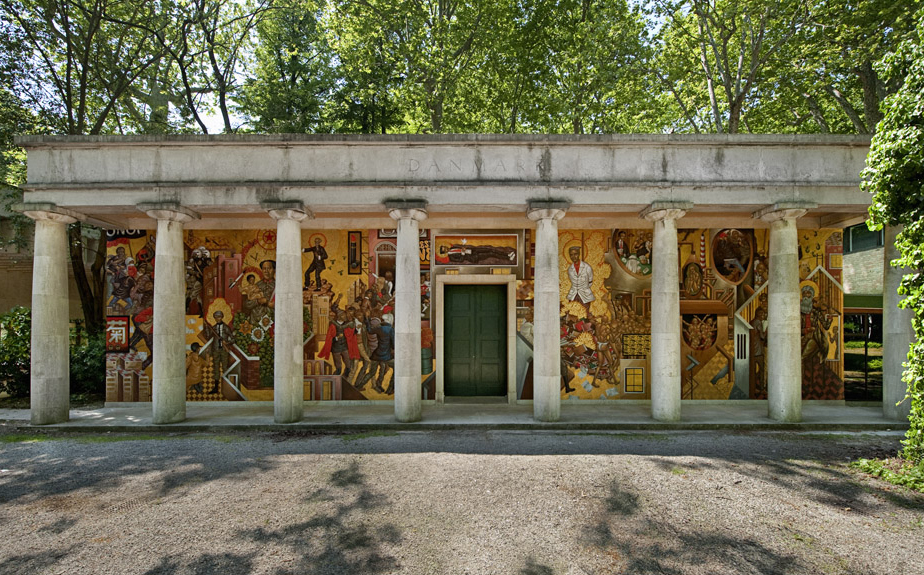
Padiglione Danimarca

The Danish pavilion houses Denmark's national representation during the Venice Biennale arts festivals. The building was designed by Carl Brummer and constructed between 1930 and 1932, and restored and expanded by Peter Koch in the 1950s.

== Background ==
The Venice Biennale is an international art biennial exhibition held in Venice, Italy. Often described as "the Olympics of the art world", participation in the Biennale is a prestigious event for contemporary artists. The festival has become a constellation of shows: a central exhibition curated by that year's artistic director, national pavilions hosted by individual nations, and independent exhibitions held throughout Venice. The Biennale's parent organisation also runs regular festivals in other arts: architecture, dance, film, music and theatre.

Outside the central international exhibition, individual nations produce their own shows, known as pavilions, as their national representation. Nations that own their pavilion buildings – such as the 30 housed in the Giardini – are responsible for their own upkeep and construction costs as well. Nations without dedicated buildings create pavilions in venues throughout the city.

== Organization and building ==
The pavilion, designed by Carl Brummer, was constructed between 1930 and 1932. Architect Peter Koch led a restoration and expansion between 1958 and 1960.

The Danish Arts Council Committee for International Visual Arts serves as commissioner for the Danish Pavilion at the Biennale, where Denmark has taken part since 1895.

== Representation by year ==
=== Art ===
- 1999 — Jason Rhoades, Peter Bonde
- 2003 — Olafur Eliasson
- 2005 — Eva Koch, Joachim Koester, Peter Land, Ann Lislegaard, Gitte Villesen
- 2007 — Troels Wörsel (Commissioner: Holger Reenberg; Assistant Commissioner: Stinna Toft Christensen)
- 2009 — Elmgreen and Dragset
- 2011 — Taryn Simon and others (Curator: Katerina Gregos)
- 2013 — Jesper Just
- 2015 — Danh Vo (Curators: Marianne Torp, Tine Vindfeld
- 2017 — Kirstine Roepstorff
- 2019 — Larissa Sansour
- 2022 — Uffe Isolotto (Curator: Jacob Lillemose)
- 2026 - Maja Majou Lyse (Curator: Chus Martínez)

== Bibliography ==
- Russeth, Andrew (April 17, 2019). "The Venice Biennale: Everything You Could Ever Want to Know". ARTnews.
- Volpi, Cristiana (2013). "Denmark". In Re Rebaudengo, Adele (ed.). Pavilions and Garden of Venice Biennale. Rome: Contrasto. p. 179. ISBN 978-88-6965-440-4.
