= Objectif Exhibitions =

Coordinates: 51.2155°N 4.4023°E

Objectif Exhibitions (vzw) was a not-for-profit contemporary art center in Antwerp, Belgium.

== Mission ==
Objectif Exhibitions received structural support from the Flemish Community, with which it supported international contemporary artists by producing exhibitions, events, and publications of and related to their work, and by providing production budgets and stipends directly to those artists. The art center reached its local and international publics in person, through printed matter, and on the Internet. The programme consisted of simultaneous and overlapping solo exhibitions, presented at differing physical and temporal scales, and with correspondingly different mediation, as well as events, off-site projects, and publications. The director was given autonomy over the programme by the board of directors, and a new director was hired every four years.

== History ==
Objectif Exhibitions (originally typeset as "objectif_exhibitions") was founded in 1999 by Philippe Pirotte, Win Van den Abbeele, and Patrick Van Rossem. Pirotte served as its first director from 1999 to 2004. When Pirotte became director of Kunsthalle Bern, Van den Abbeele became the second director of Objectif Exhibitions. In 2007, Mai Abu ElDahab became the new director, and shifted the programmatic focus to one-person exhibitions, as well as publications and events. Chris Fitzpatrick was the director from 2012 until 2015 and Antony Hudek was director from 2015 to 2016.

Objectif Exhibitions used to be located at Kleine Markt 7–9, and was moved there in 2007 by ElDahab. Willem Elsschot once lived in the residence above, and the ground floor and basement facilities inspired Elsschot's classic novel "Kaas (Cheese)." Before that, it was located at Coquilhatstraat 14.

== Collaborations and Partnerships ==
AIR Antwerpen, Antwerp; Art Brussels, Brussels; Casco, Utrecht; Fundaion CELARG, Carracas; Circuit; Contemporary Art Centre (CAC), Vilnius; HALMOS, New York; Kadist Art Foundation, Paris; Kunsthalle Bern, Switzerland; Kunsthalle Sankt Gallen, Switzerland; Matrix Art Project; Middelheim Museum, Antwerp; M HKA, Antwerp; Piet Zwart Institute, Rotterdam; Platform; Sandberg Institute, Amsterdam; The Showroom, London; Townhouse, Cairo; Villa Croce, Genoa; and Yale Union, Portland; among others.

== Exhibitions ==
Exhibitions have included a four-year exhibition by Nina Beier, a retrospective of Raphael Montañez Ortiz's "Computer-Laser-Scratch" videos, and the first and only screening of lost Bruce Conner film, which David Kasprzak screened after collecting strips of film from a San Francisco bookstore for one year, interventions by Freek Wambacq in 14 different locations throughout Antwerp, as well as exhibitions by Mariana Castillo-Deball, Corey McCorkle, Michael Portnoy, Pedro Cabrita Reis, and Anne-Mie Van Kerckhoven.

- Hugo Roelandt (2016)
- Natalia Skobeeva (2016)
- John Murphy (2015)
- Neal White (2015)
- Megan Francis Sullivan (2015)
- Nina Beier (2014)
- Liudvikas Buklys (2014)
- Frank Chu (2014)
- Bruce Conner (2014)
- Raphael Montañez Ortiz (2014)
- Post Brothers (2014)
- Daniel Turner (2014)
- Nina Beier (2013)
- Frank Chu (2013)
- Gintaras Didziapetris (2013)
- France Fiction (2013)
- Antanas Gerlikas (2013)
- Morten Norbye Halvorsen (2013)
- David Kasprzak (2013)
- Angie Keefer (2013)
- Chosil Kil (2013)
- Agnieszka Kurant (2013)
- Simon Dybbroe Moller (2013)
- Rosalind Nashashibi (2013)
- Post Brothers (2013)
- Freek Wambacq (2013)
- Nina Beier (2012)
- Frank Chu (2012)
- "Dexter Sinister, Watch Wyoscan 0.5Hz" (2012)
- Anthony Discenza (2012)
- France Fiction (2012)
- Anna Franceschini (2012)
- Joao Maria Gusmao & Pedro Paiva (2012)
- Laura Kaminskaite (2012)
- Will Rogan (2012)
- Triin Tamm (2012)
- Barbara Visser (artist) (2012)
- Agency (2011)
- Patricia Esquivias (2011)
- Hassan Kahn (2011)
- Michael Portnoy (2011)
- Matias Faldbakken (2010)
- Will Holder (2010)
- Sophie Nys (2010)
- Michael Stevenson (2010)
- Anne Daems (2009)
- Chris Evans (2009)
- Sharon Hayes (2009)
- Christian Jankowski (2009)
- Kirsten Pieroth (2009)
- Guy Ben-Ner (2008)
- Mariana Castillo Deball (2008)
- Sancho Silva (2008)
- Michael Smith (2008)
- "Bad Dad" (2007)
- "Circulez! Il n'y a rein a void" (2007)
- "for another groupshow" (2007)
- "No Negative" (2007)
- "objectif [retribution]" (2007)
- "Strike a pose" (2007)
- Roberto Cuoghi (2006)
- Tommy Simoens (2006)
- Anne-Mie Van Kerckhoven (2006)
- Vanessa Van Obberghen (2006)
- "Camuflaje" (2005)
- "The Final Floor Show" (2005)
- "Idyl - as to answer that picture" (2005)
- Knut Asdam (2004)
- Pedro Cabrita Reis (2004)
- "Close Reading #3" (2004)
- "Modern Living" (2004)
- Corey McCorkle (2003)
- Carla Arocha (2002)
- "Close Reading #2" (2002)
- Jozef Legrand (2002)
- "objectif [camouflage]" (2002)
- "Pressing" (2002)
- Dierk Schmidt (2001)
- Vanessa Van Obberghen (2001)
- Bili Bidjocka (2000)
- Nathalie Melikian (1999)

== Events ==
2013: The Baltic Notebooks of Anthony Blunt, Frank Chu, Tyler Coburn, Adam Kleinman, Peter Meanwell, Post Brothers, Aaron Schuster, "Tilting the Collector," Sissel Tolaas

2012: "An Evening Inside Four Exhibitions," "Beste Buur," "Boustrophedonic Procession (Research)," "Camping," Audrey Cottin, France Fiction, Iman Issa, Chosil Kil, Luka, Peter Meanwell, Darius Miksys, Rosalind Nashashibi, Francesco Pedraglio, Post Brothers, Will Rogan, The Serving Library, Jennifer Teets

2011: "Circular Facts Public Meeting: Discussions," "Circular Facts Public Meeting: Performances and Interventions," Norma Jeane & Tim Etchells, Michael Portnoy, Benjamin Seror, The Serving Library,

2010: "Clifford Irving Show," "The End: Tea Party," Antonio Ortega, The Serving Library

2009: "Catbag, an afternoon of Cadavre Exquis,"

2008: Michael Stevenson

2006: Knut Asdam, Joelle Tuerlinckx

2005: Anne-Mie Van Kerckhoven

== Publications ==
2013: Objectif Exhibitions, "2012"

2012: Mai Abu ElDahab, "Behave Like an Audience," Mai Abu ElDahab, "After Berkeley: Objectif Exhibitions 2010–2012," Raimundas Malasauskas, "Paper Exhibition"

2011: Mai Abu ElDahab, Binna Choi, Emily Pethick, "Circular Facts," Mai Abu ElDahab, "From Berkeley to Berkeley: Objectif Exhibitions 2008–2010," Chris Evans, Will Holder, Lisette Smits, "Goofy Audit," Hassan Khan, "The Agreement," Michael Portnoy, "Script opposition in Late-Model Carrot Jokes"

2007: Philippe Pirotte, Win Van den Abbeele, "objectif_exhibitions [group shows] 2001–2007"; Philippe Pirotte, Win Van den Abbeele, Patrick Van Rossem, "objectif_exhibitions [monographic projects] 2004–2007"

2005: Patrick Van Rossem, "Anne-Mie Van Kerckhoven: The HeadNurse-files"; Gerrit Vermeiren, "Niels Donckers"

2004: Karin Hanssen, "Modern Living"; Philippe Pirotte, "Corey McCorkle: Jugendstil"

2003: Philippe Pirotte, "objectif [camouflage]"

2002: Philippe Pirotte, Win Van den Abbeele, Patrick Van Rossem, Gerrit Vermeiren, "objectif [projects] 1999–2001"
