= Teatro Margherita =

Coordinates: 41.126354°N 16.872833°E

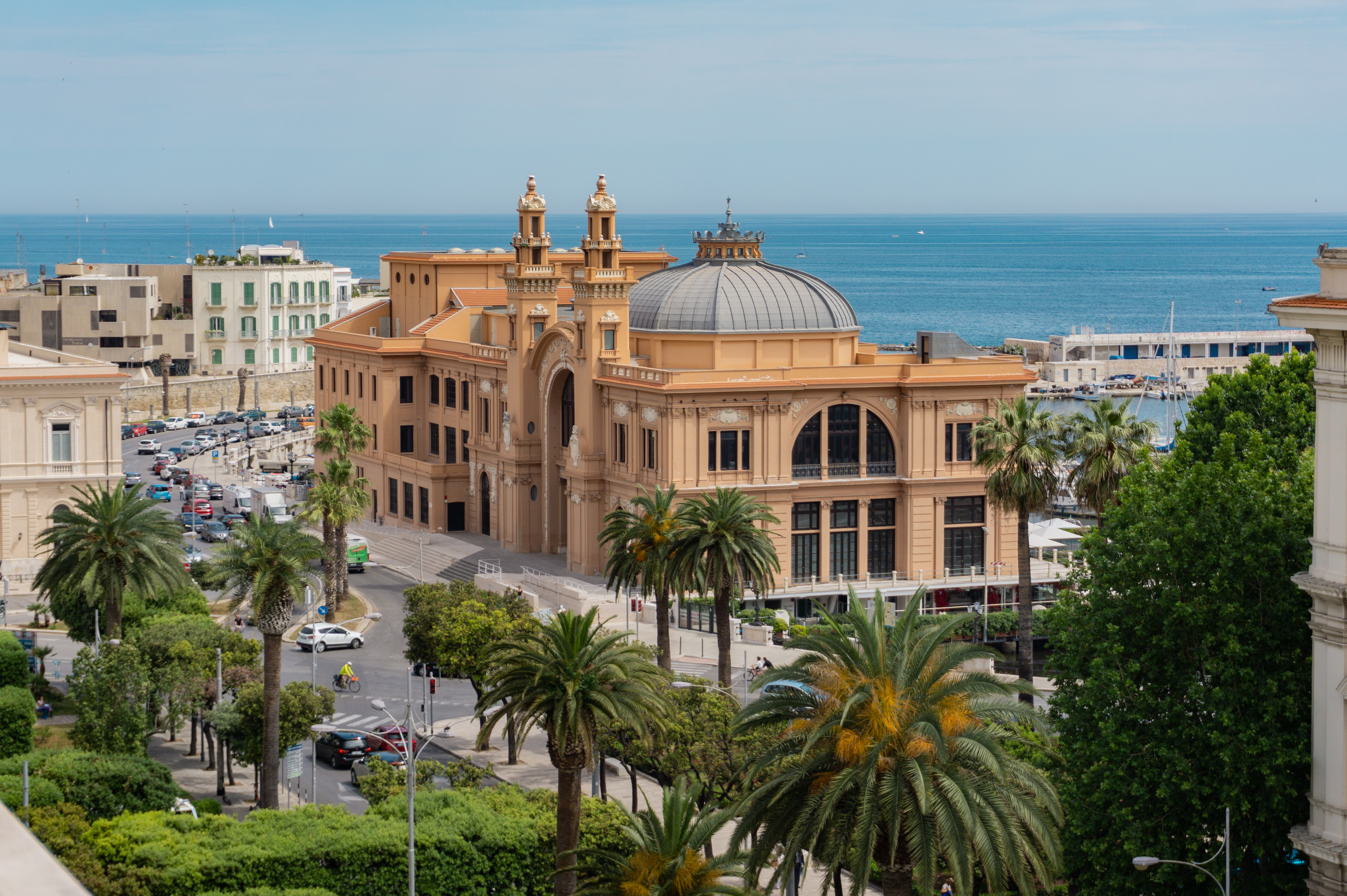
The museum in 2021

Teatro Margherita is a former theatre in the city of Bari, Apulia on the east coast of Italy. Its predecessor, a wooden structure called Varietà Margherita opened on September 5, 1910. From 1912–1914, a new theatre was erected by architect Francesco De Giglio. It opened in 1914.

The Teatro Margherita was used as a theatre and cinema until 1979. It is used as a museum now.

The Margherita Theatre in Bari was built between 1912 and 1914 in the old port area, resting on pillars anchored in the sea, in order to bypass an agreement between the municipality of Bari and the Petruzzelli family. This agreement stated that the city administration would not build any other theaters on municipal land, except for those constructed by the sea. The theatre was constructed to replace the original Varietà Margherita, a wooden building that opened on October 5, 1910. The wooden theatre faced severe criticism both from local entrepreneurs, who had presented a similar project without approval, and from the Messeni brothers, owners of the Petruzzelli Theatre, who saw the Varietà Margherita as a potential competitor.

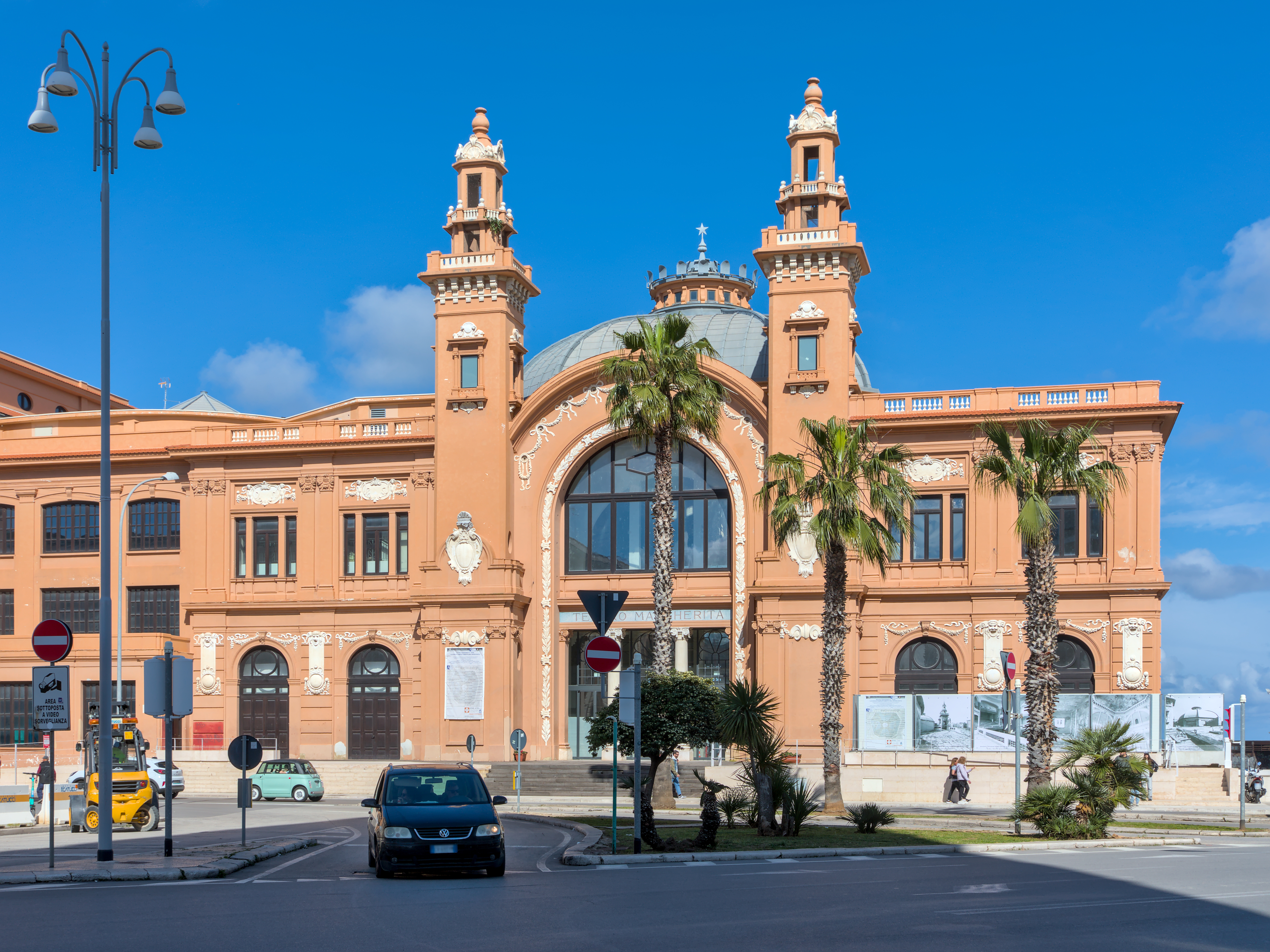
The façade.

The original wooden Margherita Theatre had a short life, as it was destroyed by a violent fire on July 22, 1911, at 3 a.m., which razed the building within an hour. The cause of the fire was never fully determined, although arson was not ruled out.
