= Nestor Pirotte =

Belgian serial killer (1933–2000)

- Born: 5 January 1933; Sosoye, Namur, Belgium
- Died: 29 July 2000 (aged 67); Jamioulx Prison, Ham-sur-Heure-Nalinnes, Wallonia, Belgium
- Other name: "The Crazy Killer"
- Conviction: Murder
- Penalty: Death; commuted to life imprisonment

Details
- Victims: 3–7
- Span of crimes: 1954–1981
- Country: Belgium
- State: Brussels
- Date apprehended: 1984

Nestor Pirotte (5 January 1933 – 29 July 2000), known as The Crazy Killer (French: Le tueur fou), was a Belgian serial killer, considered one of the deadliest Belgian criminals of the 20th century before Marc Dutroux. He was sentenced for murdering three people, in addition to being suspected of four other murders.

== Youth ==
The son of a chatelain's gamekeeper in the Château de Beau Chêne estate in the Moligneé valley and a seamstress, Nestor and his brother Anthony played with the children of aristocrats from when they were little. Often boasting about being the child of a lord, he had not only the vocabulary but the manner of the high society, which would later drive him to commit his crimes.

It was during his military service that he began to use his claimed aristocratic origins to his advantage. He invented himself a world, stating that he had begun stealing from his comrades at a very young age and looted coffers around the city. He was convicted for the first time at the age of 20, and was sentenced to a 3-month suspended sentence.

== Crimes ==
Pirotte committed his first murder on 20 April 1954, after learning that his great-aunt, Celina Debonny, had just sold some cattle. He proceeded to smash her skull with an iron bar near Durbuy, but the money had already been spent. He was condemned according to military justice law for this crime, and on 11 June 1955, he was sentenced to death, but his sentence was commuted to life imprisonment.

Pretending to be a madman so he could be interned, Pirotte was sent to a specialized psychiatric facility. On 23 March 1968, after 13 years of incarceration, he was released on parole, resuming his murders shortly afterwards. On 14 May, just a few weeks after his release, Pirotte went to a financial institution, where he pretended to be the Count of Ribaucourt. Under the pretext of wanting to negotiate a major deal discreetly, he asked to consult the manager of the bank in Genval, Mr. Delisse, whom he shot in the head.

Quickly identified, Pirotte was arrested on 21 May of the same year and was sent to prison, where he feigned a suicide attempt by throwing himself off a wall six meters high. This suicide attempt was only the first escape attempt by Pirotte. He was transferred to the Establishment of Social Defense Tournai in 1970 and, after 10 years, was considered suitable to be reintegrated into society, was released and found a job in a broadcasting store on Spintay Street in Verviers.

Pirotte became a suspect in 1980 when the gendarmes discovered the lifeless bodies of Madeleine Humbert, her two employees and the dog in the restaurant "La Vieille France" in Spa on 11 December. A manager in home appliances, Pirotte was a supplier of Humbert and a regular on the premises. The police found the name of the last customer on the slate of the restaurant: "Nestor". Pirotte was immediately suspected since the owner's son had also disappeared.

Although the lifeless body of the young man was found in January 1981, the killing remained a mystery to the police. However, Pirotte was soon arrested in Brussels for failing to comply with all the conditions of his parole. Once again imprisoned, he escaped on the night of 2–3 August, and panic settled in Belgium when the news was broadcast to the public.

Later that year, Pirotte killed again on 18 September. Pretending to be the Count de Meeûs d'Argenteuil, he offered to sell furniture from his castle to a Brussels antique dealer, whom he then murdered. Pirotte was eventually arrested for the crime by Commissioner Frédéric Godfroid of the Brussels Police and sentenced to death in 1984; once more his sentence was commuted to life in prison. Faithful to his habits, Pirotte tried to escape in 1992, but failed. After nearly 40 years behind bars, Nestor Pirotte was feared by other prisoners and remained until his death the most formidable "Public Enemy Number 1 in Belgium".

== Death ==
Pirotte died from a heart attack on 29 July 2000. Having received no visits from his family since 1980, only one woman – whom he had known from his youth – attended the funeral. He was buried anonymously in the Ham-sur-Heure cemetery. Ashamed, all members of his family left the area.

== Radio broadcast ==
- "Nestor Pirotte, the public enemy Number 1 of Belgium", broadcast on 15 January 2014, on Heure du Crime, hosted by Jacques Pradel on RTL.

== See also ==
- List of serial killers by country
