= Kirsten Pieroth =

German artist (b. 1970)

Kirsten Pieroth (born October 1970 in Offenbach) is a German artist. Pieroth currently lives and works in Berlin, Germany.

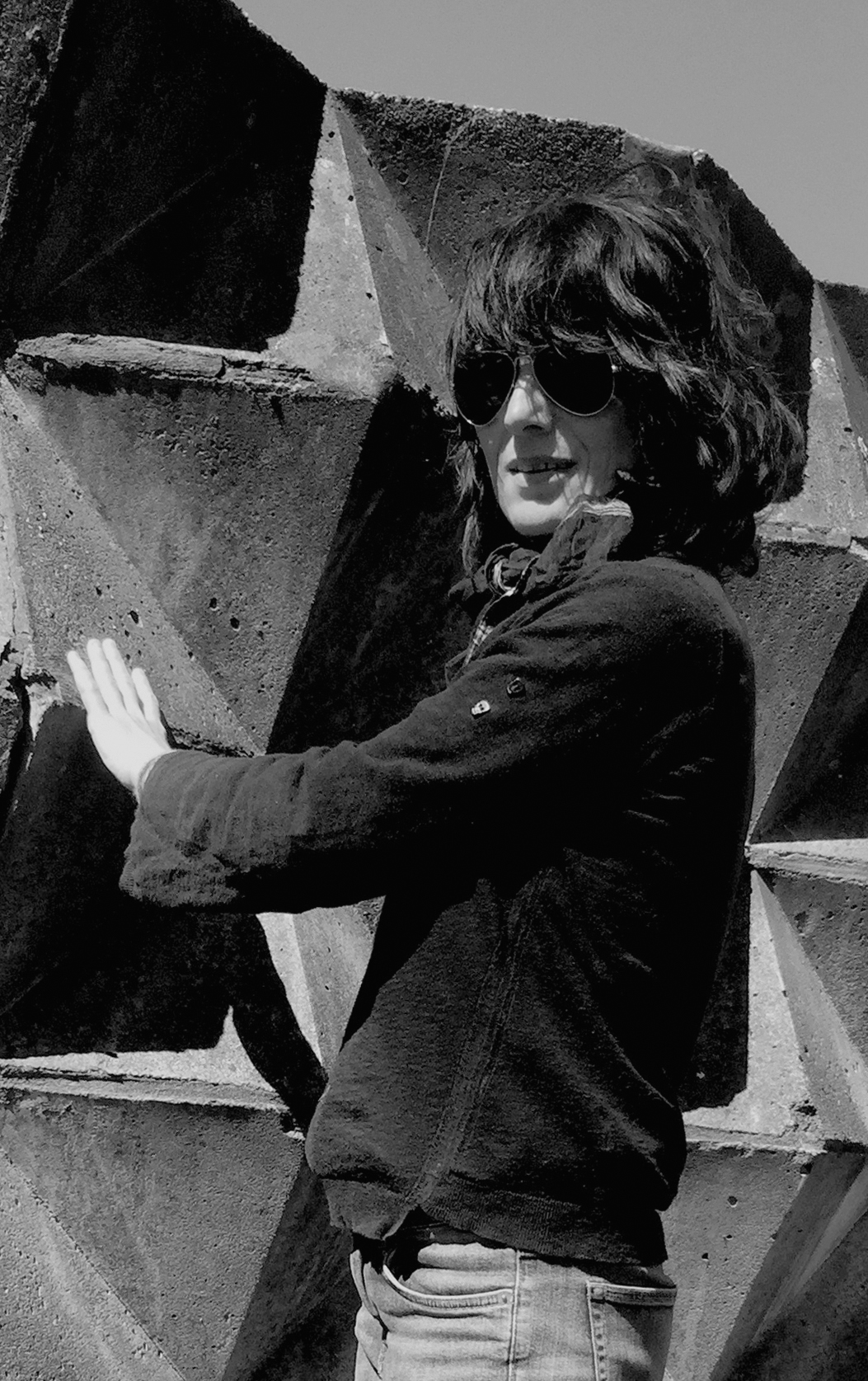
Kirsten Pieroth

Pieroth works primarily in sculpture and on paper and is known for her unconventional approach to the materials and ideas she works with. Her work focuses on questions of identity and the dynamics of the human condition, and is frequently related to questions of consumer culture in modern-day society. One of her earliest works, Berliner Pfütze, consisted of collecting and relocating the water of a Berlin street puddle. The piece was presented at the first edition of the Tirana Biennial in 2001, for which Pieroth poured the collected puddle waters onto the floor of the exhibition space of the National Museum of Fine Arts. In 2020, the artist participated in Down To Earth, an exhibition held at the Martin-Gropius-Bau and organised by the Berliner Festspiele, with the work Neuköllner Pfütze. In 2003 and 2004 Pieroth staged several solo exhibitions based on the American inventor Thomas Edison's legacy of myth-making, at Klosterfelde Gallery, Berlin, and in institutions such as Portikus, in Frankfurt am Main, and at Vancouver's Contemporary Art Gallery. More recently, Pieroth has been working with large-scale series of newspaper-based prints entitled Abrasives (2017 – ongoing), in which she prints the gestural marks of bodily actions such as kneeling or knocking, and everyday consumer items (described by the artist as 'modern devotional devices') onto the paper by way of frenzied applications of black paint, leaving multilayered renditions of the objects.

Pieroth's work has been shown in numerous international group exhibitions and biennials, including SculptureCenter, New York (2013), the 30th São Paulo Art Biennial (2012), the 12th Istanbul Biennial (2011), Tate Modern, London (2007) and Manifesta 5 in San Sebastian (2004). Solo presentations of the artist have been held at The Douglas Hyde Gallery, Dublin (2020), Mathew Gallery, New York (2018), Kunstverein Nürnberg (2013), Contemporary Arts Museum Houston (2010), Wattis Institute for Contemporary Arts, San Francisco (2008) and Secession, Vienna (2005), amongst others.

== Awards ==
2009 Cremer Prize, Stiftung Sammlung Cremer, Münster, Germany.
