= Gautier Pirotte =

Belgian sociologist (born 1973)

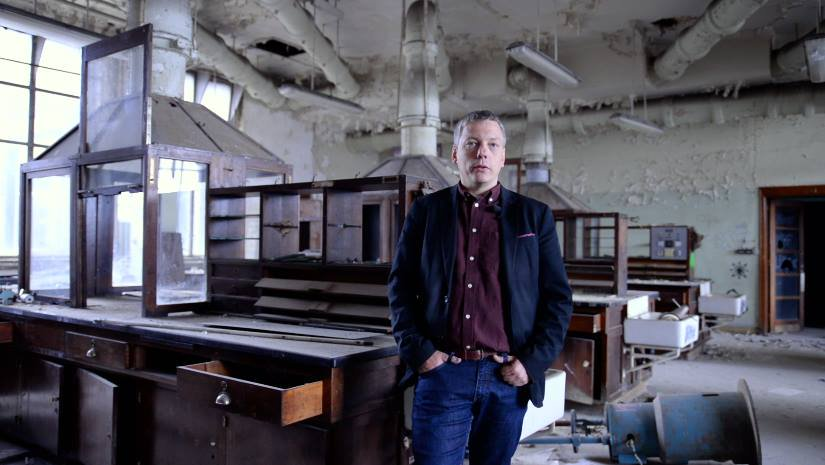
Gautier Pirotte

Gautier Pirotte (born March 29, 1973, in Rocourt) is a Belgian sociologist, PhD holder, and professor of socio-anthropology at the University of Liège. His research focuses on development cooperation, international solidarity, and theories and organizations of civil society.

== Biography ==
Early years

After studying Information and Communications (1991–1994), he studied sociology at the University of Liège (1994–1996) and then completed his doctoral thesis on the emergence of civil societies in Eastern Europe and in Sub-Saharan Africa (2002). Later, during a postdoctoral stay at the University of Lille II, he addressed the notion of humanitarian aid by looking into the Romanian humanitarian period that followed the fall of Nicolae Ceaucescu's dictatorship. From his first works came various scientific works and articles on the NGO sectors of Benin, the Democratic Republic of Congo, Romania as well as the dynamics favoring the emergence of certain forms of civil society in these countries (Pirotte G., 2011, M. Poncelet et al., 2006, Pirotte G., 2006).

University

He joined the University of Liège in September 2006 and became Chairman of Socioanthropology|Socio-Anthropology of Development. In addition to his role as a professor, he holds various positions in the Faculty of Social Sciences of the University of Liège (ULiège), he has served as the President (2007–2014) and then Jury Secretary (since 2014) of studies of the Master in Population and Development Sciences, as well as the Head of the Working Group in charge of the valorization and communication of the university faculty or Academic Secretary.

Research

At the same time, his research work since 2006 has focused more on the organization of international aid (humanitarian and development aid) as well as on the commitment to international solidarity. Gautier Pirotte coined the acronym P.I.I.S., Popular Initiative of International Solidarity (P.I.I.S., I.P.S.I. in French), to characterize forms of engagement for another distant developed by ordinary citizens, engaged not professionally in development cooperation. Through his works on P.I.I.S., Gautier Pirotte shed light on the action of these ordinary citizens and also shows the existing tensions within the scope of the cooperation subjected to the constraints of the professionalization and the effectiveness regarding interventions for help (Pirotte G., 2013, G. Pirotte & Godin J., 2013).

Leadership roles

Since 2010, in addition to his classical academic teaching, he has broadened his pedagogical commitment through further education. He created and led the university's Certificate program in Development and International Cooperation (U.C.D.I.C., C.U.D.C.I. in French) a certificate that aims to strengthen the skills of international solidarity project holders for developing countries.

In 2018, he proposed a MOOC (Massive Open Online Course) entitled "The Factory of International Aid" which is based on an approach that is both original and engaging. The students enrolled in this MOOC assume the role of a member of the Parliament of an imaginary country (The Republic of Hopeland), a country that wishes to have a legal framework for its international cooperation policy. Students enrolled in the MOOC must write and vote on this law from the materials made available on the platform of this online course (video capsules, documents, games ...).

Additionally, Gautier Pirotte often participates in numerous public debates regarding his fields of research. He has contributed frequently to the French media on matters related to the election of President Emmanuel Macron and the formation of the government of Edouard Philippe which, in the wake of the movement "En Marche", favored the access to the power of actors of French civil society.

International cooperation

As an observer and analyst of international cooperation for over twenty years, Gautier Pirotte is himself a committed player in this field. Since 2006, he has led numerous university cooperation missions to various African academic institutions, including the University of Lubumbashi, University of Abomey-Calavi, University of Bujumbura etc. From December 2014 since June 2018, he has chaired the NGO "UniverSud", an organization developing World Citizenship Education (ECM) activities on the University of Liège campus. He has also contributed to the evolution of humanitarian aid thinking within the Red Cross movement by participating in the International Scientific Council of the Red Cross|French Red Cross Foundation.

== International networks ==
- Member of the editorial board of the journals "Mondes en Développement" and "Humanitarian Alternatives".
- Member of the International Scientific Council of the French Red Cross Foundation.
- Member of the Social Science committee at IRD (Institut de recherche pour le développement in Marseille, France)

== Selected publications ==
- Pirotte, G. (2006). L'épisode humanitaire roumain. Construction d'une « crise », état des lieux et modalité de sortie. Paris, L'Harmattan
- Poncelet M., Pirotte G., Stangerling G. & Syndayihebura E. (2006), Les ONG africaines en ville. Typologie, fonctionnement et initiatives en matière de développement, Louvain-la-Neuve, Academia.
- Pirotte, G. (2011). Repenser la sociologie du développement entre dynamiques du dedans et dynamiques du dehors. Une réflexion à partir du projet de société civile au Bénin. Cahiers d'Etudes Africaines, LI (2–3)(202–203), 473–490.
- Pirotte G. & Godin J. (2013). Coopération au développement. Enquête sur les Initiatives Populaires de Solidarité Internationale, Liège, Presses Universitaires de Liège.
- Pirotte, G. (2013). Les initiatives populaires de solidarité internationale : un laboratoire d'études de la coopération internationale? Mondes en Développement, 41(161), 7–18.
- Pirotte G. (2018), La notion de société civile, Paris, La Découverte, coll. « Repères ». Seconde édition.

== Sources ==
MOOC 'La fabrique de l'aide internationale'

https://www.facebook.com/MoocFai/?hc_ref=ARR61OPckLeQoHbAwGByT0per4MB464U1y_jw8C08t3HRsOT0v5FQhjDLcDaA90h8WE&fref=nf&pnref=story [archive]

https://www.facebook.com/MoocFai/videos/177124403054297 [archive]

BIBLIO MONDE

http://www.bibliomonde.com/auteur/gautier-pirotte-1850.html [archive]

L'OBS : ARTICLE

https://www.nouvelobs.com/presidentielle-2017/20170510.OBS9229/la-societe-civile-est-une-sorte-de-lessiveuse-qui-nettoie-plus-blanc-que-blanc.html [archive]

DéFIS SUD : ARTICLE

https://www.sosfaim.be/wp-content/uploads/2014/07/defis_sud_cinquante_ans_sosfaim_pirotte-1.pdf [archive]

EUROPE1 : ARTICLE

https://www.europe1.fr/politique/la-societe-civile-en-politique-une-notion-passe-partout-3327941 [archive]

RTBF : ARTICLE

https://www.rtbf.be/info/monde/detail_gauthier-pirotte-sociologue-etre-issu-de-la-societe-civile-chez-macron-c-est-surtout-deja-faire-partie-d-une-elite?id=9609022 [archive]

UNIVERSITY OF LIEGE

http://www.reflexions.uliege.be/cms/c_13266/pirotte-gautier [archive]

THE CONVERSATION: ARTICLE (18 June 2019)

https://theconversation.com/la-belgique-face-a-la-vraie-fausse-revolution-du-coquelicot-119016?utm

LE SOIR: ARTICLE: (3 July 2019): la «société civile», nouveau souffle ou déni démocratique?

https://www.lesoir.be/234440/article/2019-07-03/carte-blanche-la-societe-civile-nouveau-souffle-ou-deni-democratique

== Bibliography ==
ORBI

https://orbi.uliege.be/ph-search?uid=U016809

BIBLIOTHEQUE BORDEAUX

http://bibliotheque.bordeaux.fr/in/faces/details.xhtml?id=mgroup%3Ap+unimarcbu_819575&jscheck=1 [archive]

CAIRN

https://www.cairn.info/la-notion-de-societe-civile--9782707146946.htm [archive]

https://www.cairn.info/publications-de-Pirotte-Gautier--20350.htm [archive]

AMAZON

https://www.amazon.fr/notion-soci%C3%A9t%C3%A9-civile-Gautier-PIROTTE/dp/2707146943 [archive]

https://www.amazon.fr/s/?ie=UTF8&keywords=gautier+pirotte&index=aps&hvadid=186571898791&hvpos=1o1&hvnetw=g&hvrand=11126376941880746045&hvpone=&hvptwo=&hvqmt=e&hvdev=c&hvdvcmdl=&hvlocint=&hvlocphy=1001386&hvtargid=kwd-15278623700&ref=pd_sl_3x5p30s1tn_e [archive]

FNAC

https://www.fnac.com/Gautier-Pirotte/ia525847 [archive]

A.P.A.D.

http://journals.openedition.org/apad/3573 [archive]

EDITIONS LA DECOUVERTE

https://www.editionsladecouverte.fr/catalogue/index-La_notion_de_soci__t___civile-9782707199614.html [archive]
