= Mother Reader: Essential Writings on Motherhood =

Mother Reader: Essential Literature on Motherhood
- Author: Moyra Davey (editor)
- Language: English
- Published: 2001
- Publisher: Seven Stories Press.
- ISBN: 9781583220726

Mother Reader: Essential Writings on Motherhood is an anthology of writings on motherhood edited by Canadian artist Moyra Davey.

== Description ==
Davey wrote that she read many of the works in the anthology after the birth of her son, “to break the isolation, for inspiration to keep going and do better, for the gratification of seeing my own experience so vividly mirrored…and for the unsurpassed enjoyment of extraordinary literature.”

== Contributors ==
Contributors to Mother Reader are Margaret Atwood, Susan Bee, Rosellen Brown, Myrel Chernick, Lydia Davis, Buchi Emecheta, Annie Ernaux, Mary Gaitskill, Susan Griffin, Nancy Huston, Mary Kelly, Jane Lazarre, Ursula Le Guin, Doris Lessing, Ellen McMahon, Margaret Mead, Vivian Montgomery, Toni Morrison, Tillie Olsen, Alicia Ostrker, Grace Paley, Sylvia Plath, Adrienne Rich, Sara Ruddick, Lynda Schor, Mira Schor, Dena Schottenkirk, Mona Simpson, Elizabeth Smart, Joan Snyder, Elke Solomon, Susan Rubin Suleiman, Alice Walker, Joy Williams, Martha Wilson, Barbara Zucker.
