= Moyra Davey =

Canadian artist

- Born: 1958 (age 67–68); Toronto, Ontario, Canada
- Education: University of California, San Diego; Whitney Museum of American Art Independent Study Program
- Known for: Photographer, video artist, writer
- Notable work: Copperheads (1990–ongoing); Newsstands (1994); Les Goddesses (2011); Horse Opera (2019–2022)
- Awards: Governor General's Awards in Visual and Media Arts, John Simon Guggenheim Memorial Foundation Fellowship, Scotiabank Photography Award, Louis Comfort Tiffany Foundation Award, Anonymous Was A Woman Award

Moyra Davey (born 1958, Toronto, ON) is an artist known for her experimental films that take root in written monologues, her portraits, and her essays that pair photography and language. She works across photography, video, and writing, and has been living in New York City since 1988.

== Early life and education ==
Davey was born in 1958 in Toronto, Ontario, Canada. She grew up in Montreal, where she studied photography and received a BFA from Concordia University in 1982. She then achieved an MFA from the University of California, San Diego in 1988. In 1989, she attended The Whitney Museum of American Art Independent Study Program.

== Work ==
Davey was one of twelve co-organizers of the alternative exhibition space, Orchard, which ran from 2005 to 2008 on a storefront on Orchard St. in New York's Lower East Side. The venue presented more than two dozen exhibitions, one of them Davey's self-organized project “Reality / Play.”

She edited the anthology Mother Reader: Essential Writings on Motherhood, published in 2001 by Seven Stories Press in New York. The collection of writings brought together essays and texts by an array of artists, writers and thinkers who spoke plainly and poetically on the topic of motherhood (often their own).

For her 2007 solo exhibition at goodwater gallery, Toronto, Davey mailed some of her photographs to the Canadian gallery through the US postal system, by folding them up to letter size and taping them at the edges. The photographs, affixed with address labels and postage, were cut open, unfolded, installed pinned to the wall, without a frame. This was the beginning of a major and ongoing motif in her photographic practice, which would result in mailed arrangements of photographs in varying scale, including grids of hundreds of photographs at venues such as Portikus, Frankfurt, in 2017.

Davey's first solo survey, Long Life, Cool White, was organized by Helen Molesworth in 2008 at the Fogg Museum, Harvard University, where she was curator. The exhibition brought together a numerous series of work that Davey had produced over the past few decades, such as “Newsstands” (1994), “Copperheads” (1990–ongoing), “Books & Dust” (1999), and more. A compact book was published alongside the exhibition that included essays by Davey and Molesworth, along with plates of Davey's photography.

In 2011, Davey completed work on her third short film, Les Goddesses, which followed her historical fascination with the 18th-century feminist writer Mary Wollstonecraft; her writings, her partner William Godwin, and her progeny. In the film, Davey established a narrative link to the lives of her and her sisters' Montreal childhood, taking place 200 years later. The work was first screened at greengrassi, London, in 2011, and went on to be shown in venues including the Museum of Modern Art, White Columns, the Whitney Museum of American Art, all New York; ICA and Camden Arts Centre, both London; Museo Jumex, Mexico City; 30a Bienal de São Paulo; Museo Nacional Centro de Arte Reina Sofia, Madrid; Artium Museoa, Vitoria-Gasteiz; the National Gallery of Canada, Ottawa, among many others.

The 14th installment of Documenta (2017) included Davey's work, which was installed across sites in Athens, Greece and Kassel, Germany. For each location, she created site-specific large-scale photographic installations, which arrived at their respective venues via regular airmail, as individual prints, folded up and taped. Her work for Athens, Portrait-Landscape, was accompanied by a short film, Wedding Loop, both of which were later exhibited at Galerie Buchholz, Berlin. The accompanying film would later be shown at venues including Film Society of Lincoln Center, New York; British Film Institute, London; Tate St Ives; Museum of Modern Art, New York; and many others.

In 2020, a collection of Davey's writings was published by New Directions and Fitzcarraldo Editions, edited by Nicolas Linnert. Titled Index Cards, the paperback included essays on photography, art making, reading and writing, and the historical figures that inspire much of her work, such as Janet Malcolm, Chantal Akerman, Jean Genet, and many others. The publication comprised over a dozen texts written as early as 2003.

Later in 2020, a major survey of Davey's work was shown at the National Gallery of Canada, Ottawa. The exhibition included many of her mailed photographic installations, including large scale series such as Subway Writers, 2014, and her ongoing "Copperheads" project, 1990–. Entitled The Faithful, the exhibition also highlighted Davey's portraiture practice, with subjects ranging from friends and family to equines and wildlife. Her short, essayistic films also received notable attention, with six on display that dated from 2019 on back to the early 90s.

Davey's first feature film, Horse Opera, premiered in 2022 at the FRONT International in Cleveland, followed by an extensive film festival tour that included premiere screenings at the 47th Toronto International Film Festival (Tiff); 73rd Berlin International Film Festival (Berlinale); New Horizons International Film Festival, Wroclaw, Poland; and Fronteira Film Festival, Brasília. The film anchored Davey's expansive 2022 film survey at Museum of Modern Art, New York, and celebrated New York City's nightlife culture, juxtaposing a cast of characters frequenting the city's iconic dance parties, amidst reflections on the aging human body and depictions of socializing equine gatherings, all interrupted by 2020's extraordinary COVID-19 lockdowns.

== Teaching ==
Davey has taught at ICP-Bard College MFA in Advanced Photographic Studies, New York; Vermont College MFA in Visual Arts; and Programme d'Études Postgrades CCC, Geneva.

== Publications ==
- Mother Reader: Essential Writings on Motherhood. Edited by Davey (New York: Seven Stories, 2001). ISBN 1583220720
- The Problem of Reading (Los Angeles: Documents Books, 2003). ISBN 0974260509
- Long Life Cool White: Photographs and Essays by Moyra Davey (Cambridge, MA: Harvard University Art Museums; New Haven: Yale University Press, 2008). Introduction by Helen Molesworth. ISBN 9780300136463
- Copperheads (Toronto: Byewater Bros. Editions, 2010). ISBN 9780978078935
- Speaker Receiver (Berlin: Sternberg, 2010). Essays by George Baker, Bill Horrigan, Chris Kraus, and Eric Rosenberg, and an interview by Adam Szymczyk. ISBN 9781934105207.
- The Wet and the Dry (Paris: Paraguayress, 2011). Edited by castillo/corrales and Will Holder. ISBN 9782918252115
- Empties (Vancouver: Presentation House, 2013).
- Burn the Diaries (Brooklyn: Dancing Foxes, 2014). ISBN 9780985337728
- I'm Your Fan (London: Camden Arts Centre, 2014).
- Les Goddesses / Hemlock Forest (Brooklyn: Dancing Foxes, 2017). Introduction by Aveek Sen. ISBN 9780998632605
- Gold Dumps and Ant Hills (Berlin: Toupée, 2017). ISBN 9783981735710
- Index Cards: Selected Essays (New Directions, 2020). Edited by Nicolas Linnert. ISBN 9780811229517
- I Confess (Ottawa/Brooklyn: National Gallery of Canada and Dancing Foxes, 2020). Essays by Dalie Giroux and Andrea Kunard. ISBN 9780888849960

== Films ==
=== Shorts ===
- Hell Notes (1990)
- Fifty Minutes (2006)
- My Necropolis (2009)
- Hujar / Palermo (2010)
- Les Goddesses (2011)
- My Saints (2014)
- Notes on Blue (2015)
- Hemlock Forest (2016)
- Wedding Loop (2017)
- i confess (2019)
- Forks & Spoons (2024)

=== Feature films ===
- Horse Opera (2022)

== Solo exhibitions ==
- 1985 – Agnes Etherington Art Centre, Kingston, Ontario
- 1994 – Moyra Davey, Peter Doig, Gavin Brown's Enterprise, New York; American Fine Arts, Co., New York
- 2006 – Monologues (with Julia Scher), Wexner Center for the Arts, Columbus, Ohio
- 2008 – Long Life Cool White, The Fogg Art Museum, Harvard Art Museums, Harvard University, Cambridge, Massachusetts
- 2009 – My Necropolis, Arch II Gallery, University of Manitoba, Winnipeg
- 2009 – My Necropolis, Murray Guy, New York
- 2010 – Speaker Receiver, Kunsthalle Basel, Basel, Switzerland
- 2012 – Spleen. Indolence. Torpor. Ill-humour., Murray Guy, New York
- 2013 – Ornament and Reproach, Presentation House Gallery, Vancouver
- 2013 – Hangmen of England, Tate Liverpool, Liverpool, UK
- 2014 – Burn the Diaries, Mumok, Vienna; Camden Arts Centre, London
- 2014 – Ornament and Reproach, Murray Guy, New York
- 2016 – 7 Albums, Murray Guy, New York
- 2017 – Empties, Galerie Buchholz, Cologne
- 2017 – Portrait / Landscape, Galerie Buchholz, Berlin
- 2017 – Hell Notes, Portikus, Frankfurt
- 2018 – Hell Notes, Kunstverein Bielefeld, Bielefeld
- 2018 – "1943", Galerie Buchholz, New York
- 2018 – Bring My Garters/Do Nothing, experimenter, Kolkata
- 2019 – Scotiabank Photography Award: Moyra Davey, Ryerson Image Centre, Toronto;
- 2019 – Les Goddesses, Art Institute of Chicago
- 2019 – i confess, greengrassi, London
- 2020 – Moyra Davey Peter Hujar, Galerie Buchholz, Berlin (with Peter Hujar)
- 2020 – The Faithful, National Gallery of Canada, Ottawa
- 2020 – Lanak/Obras/Works, Artium Museum, Vitoria-Gasteiz, Spain
- 2022 – Film series, Museum of Modern Art, New York

== Awards ==
- 2004 – Anonymous Was A Woman Award
- 2010 – The Louis Comfort Tiffany Foundation Award
- 2018 – Scotiabank Photography Award
- 2020 – John Simon Guggenheim Memorial Foundation Fellowship
- 2022 – Governor General's Awards in Visual and Media Arts

== Collections ==
Davey's work is held in the following permanent collections:

- Mildred Lane Kemper Art Museum, St. Louis, Missouri;
- Museum of Modern Art, New York
- Tate, London
- Metropolitan Museum of Art, New York
- Art Institute of Chicago, the Whitney Museum of American Art, New York
- Solomon R. Guggenheim Museum, New York
- San Francisco Museum of Modern Art,
- Museum of Contemporary Art, Los Angeles
- National Gallery of Art, Washington, DC
- National Gallery of Canada, Ottawa
- Art Gallery of Ontario, Toronto
