= Brian D. Butler =

Art dealer

- Born: July 1, 1961 (age 65); Los Angeles, California
- Occupation: Art dealer
- Known for: Owner of 1301PE

Brian D. Butler (born July 1, 1961) is an art dealer and owner of the 1301PE Gallery in Los Angeles.

== Early life ==
Butler was born and raised in Los Angeles, California. He graduated from UC Berkeley where he studied art history.

== Brain Multiples ==
In 1991, Butler began Brain Multiples to produce and exhibit artists’ editions. He financed, edited, published and distributed artists’ multiples, books and video editions. Rather than representing artists, Butler chose to collaborate with them on projects about which he was particularly enthusiastic. Among the artists whose editions have been produced by Brain Multiples are John Baldessari, AA Bronson, Meg Cranston, Gretchen Faust, Rachel Khedoori, Paul McCarthy, Jorge Pardo, Jason Rhoades, Thaddeus Strode, Diana Thater, and Rirkrit Tiravanija.

== 1301 ==
On April 29, 1992, Butler opened the 1301 Gallery in Santa Monica, California. The purpose of 1301 was to present the work of artists, particularly those based in Los Angeles, in world-class one-person and group exhibitions. The opening exhibition of 1301 was Raw Material by Kate Ericson and Mel Ziegler. Subsequent exhibitions at 1301 included a presentation of Jason Rhoades’ work, a group show featuring the work of Meg Cranston, Jorge Pardo, Rirkrit Tiravanija, Lincoln Tobier, and Sarah Seager, and Into the Lapse, a presentation over one month which showed video works of over thirty artists.

== 1301PE ==
In 1996, 1301 became 1301PE, standing for Projects and Editions. In 1998, 1301PE moved from Santa Monica to its current location on the Miracle Mile in Los Angeles. The new location of the gallery welcomed the experimentation and smaller side projects of many internationally renowned artists. 1301PE presented the critically acclaimed exhibition Together again like never before: the complete poster work of Michael Asher and Martin Kippenberger, and the first presentation of the sole surviving member of General Idea AA Bronson’s work Felix, June 5, 1994, which shows Felix Partz, one of Bronson’s partners in the collective, on his deathbed having just succumbed to AIDS related illness.

Between 2005 and 2008 Butler took over as director of ARTSPACE in Auckland, New Zealand. While at ARTSPACE, Butler established an endowment and helped found a publishing arm of the gallery called Clouds. With the project Speculation, Butler curated an exhibition for the 52nd Venice Biennale in the format of a book. He selected seven artists who in turn selected thirty artists to present a collection of their works.

In 2008, Butler returned to Los Angeles, where he continues to oversee 1301PE’s exhibition program. Butler and 1301PE have represented such internationally acclaimed artists as Fiona Banner, of the Young British Artists, MacArthur Fellows Uta Barth and Jorge Pardo, Jack Goldstein, Philippe Parreno, Jessica Stockholder, Diana Thater, Rirkrit Tiravanija, Pae White and Paul Winstanley. Emerging artists whom the gallery represents include Jan Albers, Fiona Connor, Kirsten Everberg, Jorge Mendez Blake, Blake Rayne, SUPERFLEX and Kerry Tribe.

== Philanthropy ==
Butler has been a committee member of Angel Art Auction benefiting Project Angel Food and the Pasadena Art Alliance.
