= 1301PE =

Los Angeles gallery founded in 1992

1301PE is a gallery in Los Angeles founded by Brian D. Butler in 1992.

== Brain Multiples ==
Butler began Brain Multiples in 1991 to finance, edit, publish and distribute artists’ editions. Rather than representing artists, Butler collaborated with them on projects in which he found interest. Artists who have produced Brain Multiples with Butler include John Baldessari, Rachel Khedoori, Paul McCarthy, Jorge Pardo, Philippe Parreno, Jason Rhoades, Katy Schimert, Diana Thater and Rirkrit Tiravanija, among others.

== 1301 ==
The original incarnation of 1301PE was as 1301, which was located at Butler's apartment, 1301 Franklin Street, Santa Monica, CA. The founding principle was to present world class exhibitions of artists primarily based in Los Angeles. The first show at 1301 was Raw Material by Kate Ericson and Mel Ziegler, which opened on 29 April 1992. Shows at 1301 featured work by artists Jamey Bair, Angela Bulloch, Meg Cranston, Sarah Seager and Thaddeus Strode, as well as a group show called Into the Lapse which presented video work by artists General Idea, Sean Landers, Jim Shaw, Diana Thater, Bruce and Norman Yonemoto and others.

In 1996, 1301 became 1310PE, standing for Projects and Editions. For a period 1301PE had no permanent location, and Butler curated exhibitions in other galleries, such as an exhibition of the artist Angela Bulloch at the gallery owned by Marc Foxx. Other projects curated during this time included a collaboration between an Iranian carpet weaver and the artist Mike Kelley, the work Ranch by Jorge Pardo and Jason Rhoades, and Diana Thater's presentation of The best animals are the flat animals and The best space is the deep space at MAK Center for Art and Architecture.

In 1998, 1301PE reopened in its current location on the Miracle Mile in Los Angeles. Since its reopening, 1301PE has continued to exhibit the work of Los Angeles-based as well as internationally acclaimed artists. In addition to established artists whom the gallery has represented, such as Fiona Banner, Uta Barth, Charline von Heyl, Jack Goldstein, Ann Veronica Janssens, Judy Ledgerwood, Philippe Parreno, John Reynolds, Jessica Stockholder, Pae White, and Paul Winstanley, 1301PE also works with young artists including Jan Albers, Fiona Connor, Kirsten Everberg, Jorge Mendez Blake, Blake Rayne, SUPERFLEX, Petra Cortright, and Kerry Tribe.
