= Elizabeth A. T. Smith =

American art historian, museum curator (born 1958)

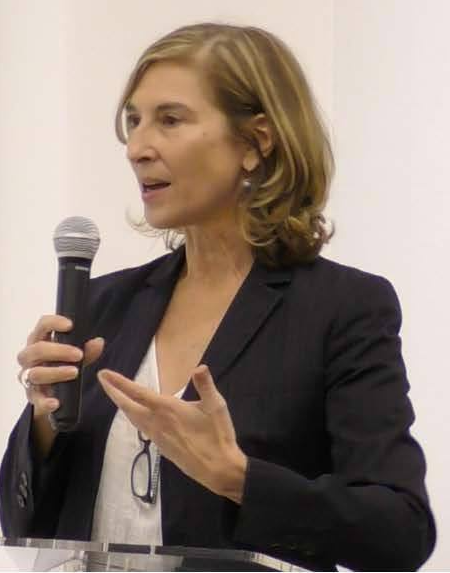
- Born: 1958 (age 67–68); Boston, Massachusetts, US

Academic work
- Discipline: Art historian; curator; writer

Elizabeth A. T. Smith (born 1958) is an American art historian, museum curator, writer, and presently the executive director of the Helen Frankenthaler Foundation. She has formerly held positions as a curator at the Los Angeles Museum of Contemporary Art (MoCA), the chief curator and deputy director of programs at the Museum of Contemporary Art, Chicago, and the executive director, curatorial affairs, at the Art Gallery of Ontario. She is the author of numerous books on art and architecture, including Blueprints for Modern Living: History and Legacy of the Case Study Houses; Lee Bontecou: A Retrospective, Helen Frankenthaler: Composing with Color, 1962–63, and many others.

== Biography ==
Elizabeth Smith joined the Helen Frankenthaler Foundation as its first executive director in fall 2013. In 2025, she also joined the board of Directors of the Helen Frankenthaler Foundation.

Her previous position as executive director, curatorial affairs at the Art Gallery of Ontario (AGO) in Toronto was from 2010 to 2013, and her position as Chief Curator and Deputy Director of Programs at Chicago's Museum of Contemporary Art (MCA) was from 1999 to 2009. Prior to joining MCA, her position as Curator at The Museum of Contemporary Art (MOCA) in Los Angeles was from 1983 to 1999.

Smith's curatorial work and writings have spread extensively across many areas, including visual art, public art, and architecture from mid-20th century forward, and have continuously advanced the work of many women artists. While at AGO, Smith curated and oversaw exhibitions on the work of artists Yael Bartana and Kim Adams, as well as group shows with artists including LaToya Ruby Frazier and Erin Shirreff, and was curator-in-charge of traveling exhibitions such as Abstract Expressionist New York, Chagall and the Russian Avant-Garde curated by Angela Lampe, and Picasso: Masterpieces from the Musée Picasso.

As MCA's Chief Curator, Smith curated solo exhibitions of artists Jenny Holzer, Lee Bontecou, Kerry James Marshall, Roberto Matta, Catherine Opie, and Donald Moffett, exhibitions on architecture such as Sustainable Architecture in Chicago: Works in Progress and Garofalo Architects: Between the Museum and the City, and many presentations of MCA's collection. Smith's curatorial projects while at MOCA Los Angeles ranged from Blueprints for Modern Living: History and Legacy of the Case Study Houses, The Architecture of R.M. Schindler, named by the American section of the International Association of Art Critics as the "Best Architecture or Design Exhibition of the Year", and At the End of the Century: 100 Years of Architecture to a survey of the Cindy Sherman's photographs and the first museum presentations of then-emerging artists Uta Barth, Toba Khedoori, Catherine Opie, and Margaret Honda as well as a collaboration between artist Kiki Smith and architect Wolf Prix of Coop Himmelblau.

Besides her exhibition catalogues, Smith's writings have appeared in such publications as Do-ho Suh: Drawings; Chicago Makes Modern; Buckminster Fuller: Starting with the Universe; Design Cities 1851–2008; Birth of the Cool; and the 54th Carnegie International. She is the author of Techno Architecture (2000) and books on the Los Angeles Case Study Houses (2002/2006). Her essay "Redefining a Practice: Helen Frankenthaler and Painting in the Early 1960s" appeared in the catalogue Helen Frankenthaler: Composing with Color, 1962–1963, co-published by Gagosian Gallery and Rizzoli International Publications in 2014. Her essay on Helen Frankenthaler's use of color was published in a special issue on color in the journal PUBLIC, in October 2015, her text on five sculptors of the 1950s appears in the book "Revolution in the making: Abstract Sculpture by Women 1947–2016," and she is the lead essayist in the 2021 book Catherine Opie, published by Phaidon Press.

Smith received her B.A. from Barnard College and her M.A. in Art History at Columbia University in New York City. She was adjunct professor in the Public Art Studies program of the School of Fine Arts at the University of Southern California in Los Angeles and at the School of the Art Institute of Chicago, and served as an adjunct professor in the Museum Term Program at Bennington College. She has received awards and honors from the Getty Foundation, the International Association of Art Critics, the Chicago Tribune, and others. Smith served a six-year term on the Board of Trustees of the Graham Foundation for Advanced Studies in the Fine Arts in Chicago and was a 2012 Fellow of the Center for Curatorial Leadership in New York. In 2021 she was awarded by the government of France the insignia of Chevalier of the Ordre des Arts et des Lettres, for helping American audiences connect with French artists across decades. She has served as a member of the Board of Trustees of the Association of Art Museum Curators (AAMC), and ArtTable, a leadership organization for women in the arts.

In 2004 Smith won the "Best Monographic Museum Show Nationally" award from the Art Critics Association/USA for her exhibition Lee Bontecou: A Retrospective, and her catalogue for the exhibition was described by the Museum of Contemporary Art, Chicago, as "one of the best-selling in the museum's history."
