= Ana Prvacki =

- Born: 1976 (age 49–50); Pančevo, Yugoslavia
- Occupation: Artist
- Known for: Themes of etiquette, Cross-disciplinary approach
- Spouse: Sam Durant
- Children: Divna (daughter)
- Parent: Milenko Prvacki (father)
- Website: http://anaprvacki.com/

Ana Prvacki (born 1976) is a conceptual performance and installation artist who has exhibited internationally. She is known for exploring social interactions in her work and using music to express core ideas such as eroticism.

== Career ==
Described as having an "imitation-exploring, comedic approach", Prvacki has been creating performance and conceptual art projects for the past 15 years. She addresses topics like art appropriation, eroticism, etiquette, hospitality and mealtimes, leading some to call her the "Martha Stewart meets Marina Abramović" of performance art. Prvacki's work often links manners to the ethics of civility.

Issues of social anxiety and faux pas are a common thread in her pieces. According to the artist, her experiences of living abroad have shaped her work "...I was hypersensitive to the differences, that daily experience of negotiating social situations and always having things go wrong. But when things go wrong, to me, is the most interesting."

Prvacki has also tackled ideas of chivalry and clean money, as well as exploring subjects via a musical approach. An accomplished flute player, she created a conceptual audio work for Boston's Isabella Stewart Gardner Museum that was inspired by the building's architectural space. In 2016, she transformed a musical recital into performance art at the Walt Disney Concert Hall in Los Angeles. In 2015, she also explored the relationship between music and eroticism for a solo show at the 1301PE Gallery in Los Angeles. Classical sheet music was covered with doodles of genitalia, in order to provoke the uncomfortable feelings society has about music and female sexuality. Another show at the same gallery examined art appropriation, by creating shadow art from the world's priciest sculptural works.

A recent piece was created for the 2017 Chicago Architecture Biennial and resulted from a collaboration with the US architecture firm SO-IL. Four musicians performed in a conservatory wearing giant air filters that completely covered their heads and bodies. Prvacki has also exhibited at the 2012 Documenta 13 in Germany and the 2015 Contour Biennial in Belgium.

A 2015 show for the ICA Singapore examined issues of sustainability, with regards to large art projects and their potential drain on the world's limited resources. Her ideas from unrealized projects, in the form of blueprints and drawings, were exhibited on the walls of the museum space. One of Prvacki's earlier shows was curated by performance artist Marina Abramović and involved a money-laundering premise.

Prvacki's work can be found in the permanent collections of the Los Angeles Museum of Contemporary Art (MOCA) and Italy's Castello di Rivoli. She has also exhibited at various venues including the Centre Georges Pompidou in Paris, the Utah Museum of Contemporary Art, the Hammer Museum in Los Angeles, Chicago's Smart Museum of Art, Boston's Isabella Stewart Gardner Museum and the 1301PE Gallery in Los Angeles Prvacki will be in residence at San Francisco's de Young museum starting in 2018 until 2019.

== Background ==
Prvacki's artistic influences stem from feeling like a foreigner wherever she has lived. Born in Yugoslavia, she is half Romanian and half Serbian, and lived in Singapore as a teenager. She studied theatre, classical flute and beekeeping. Prvacki is married to artist Sam Durant. Her father Milenko Prvacki has lived in Singapore since 1991. He is an abstract artist, art educator and Cultural Medallion recipient.
