= Irene Pijoan =

American artist

- Born: November 11, 1953; Lausanne, Switzerland
- Died: August 18, 2004 (aged 50); Berkeley, California, U.S.
- Other name: Irène Pijoan
- Occupations: Painter, sculptor, educator
- Years active: 1976–2004
- Spouse: Craig Nagasawa
- Children: 1
- Parents: Joseph Pijoan (father); Geneviève Bugnion (mother)

Irene Pijoan (1953–2004) was a Swiss-born American painter, sculptor, and educator. She was active in the San Francisco Bay Area and taught at the San Francisco Art Institute for more than 20 years.

== Early life and education ==
Irene Pijoan was born on November 11, 1953, in Lausanne, Switzerland to parents Geneviève Bugnion and Joseph Pijoan. Her mother was Swiss, her father was a Spanish architect, art historian, philosopher, and poet in the Catalan language.

Pijoan received her bachelor of arts degree in 1978, followed by her fine arts master's of fine art degree in 1980 from University of California, Davis. She also took classes at California State University, Sacramento. In 1979, Pijoan was awarded a scholarship to the Skowhegan School of Painting and Sculpture. In 1981–1982, she was awarded the Roswell Artist-in-Residence.

== Career ==
One of her early solo exhibitions was in 1977 at Off-Brand Gallery (formerly Acme) in the former North Sacramento City Hall. Starting in 1983, she began teaching at San Francisco Art Institute (SFAI) where she remained until her death in 2004. She was a teacher of artist Jason Rhoades.

Her art work was created in a wide range of styles and materials. In the beginning of her career she was working with abstract Funk art sculptures, followed by with figurative and portrait pieces in multidimensional encaustic, and over time her work became more abstracted. Pijoan was known for her cut paper and cut metal art.

She created public art in the form of large scale aluminum cut-out screens on display at Highland Hospital in Oakland; Santa Clara Public Library; Victoria Manalo Draves Park in SOMA, San Francisco; and at the Harborview Medical Building in Seattle.

== Death and legacy ==
Starting in 1999, Pijoan battled breast cancer. She died on August 18, 2004, in Berkeley, California. Pijoan was married to artist Craig Nagasawa, and together they had one daughter.

Her work is in museum collections including at the San Francisco Museum of Modern Art (SFMoMA), and San José Museum of Art.

== Publications ==
- Irene Pijoan: Exhibition September 12-October 10, 1982, Roswell Museum & Art Center (exhibition). Roswell Museum And Art Center. 1982.
- Walker, Anne Macdonald (1984). Paravent; Extending the Range of Expression. David Bates, Deborah Oropallo, Robert Mapplethorpe, Markus Lüpertz, Roy De Forest, Salome, Irene Pijoan, Robert Dix, Elvira Bach, Ed Ruscha. San Francisco, CA: Artspace.
- Irene Pijoan (exhibition). Rena Bransten Gallery. 1990.
- Irene Pijoan: Non-space Elements (exhibition). San Jose Institute of Contemporary Art. 2001. ISBN 9780971303409.
