= Kerry Tribe =

American visual artist (born 1973)

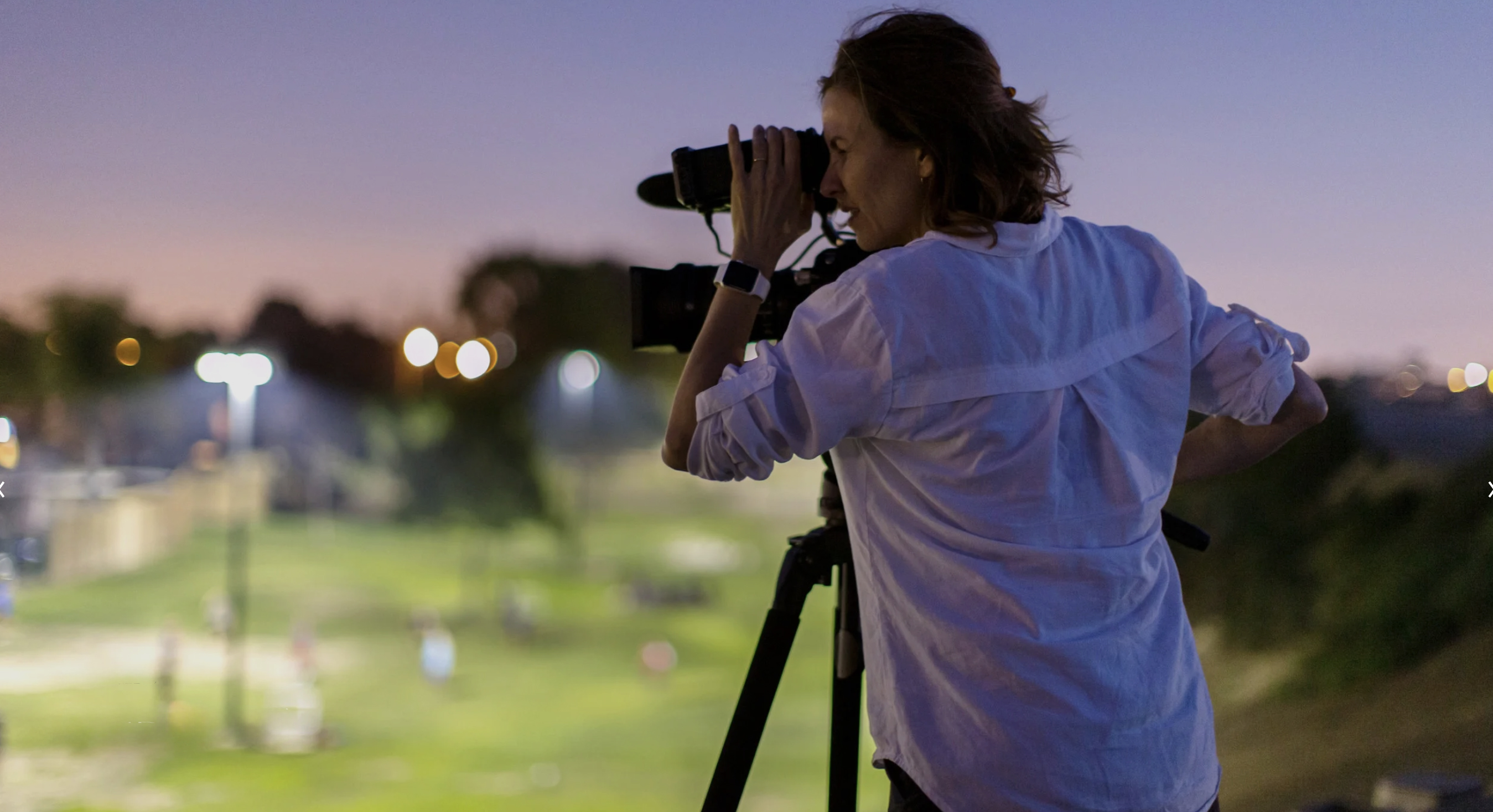
- Tribe in 2016
- Born: 1973 (age 52–53); Boston, Massachusetts, U.S.
- Known for: Installation art, film, new media, digital art, photography, sculpture
- Awards: Herb Alpert Award; Creative Capital; Louis Comfort Tiffany; California Community Foundation; USArtists International
- Website: Kerry Tribe

Kerry Tribe, The Aphasia Poetry Club, Three-channel video projection with sound, 28:27 min., Installation view, 365 Mission, Los Angeles, 2015.

Kerry Tribe (born 1973) is an American visual artist and filmmaker based in Los Angeles. Her work includes video, film and sound installations, sculpture, performance, drawing and photography. Tribe's art investigates subjective aspects of consciousness such as memory, language, cognition, and empathy through subjects including medical conditions and clinical training, historical incidents, and collective and personal experience.

Tribe's work belongs to the public collections of the Los Angeles County Museum of Art, Museum of Modern Art (MoMA), Whitney Museum, San Francisco Museum of Modern Art (SFMOMA), and Hammer Museum, among others. She has exhibited at the latter four institutions, and others including The Power Plant, the High Line in New York and Museum of Contemporary Art Australia. In 2017, she received the Herb Alpert Award in the Arts for film and video.

== Life and career ==
Tribe was born in Boston and grew up in Cambridge, Massachusetts. Her father is the legal scholar Laurence Tribe and her mother is Carolyn Kreye Tribe; new media artist Mark Tribe is her brother. She studied art and semiotics at Brown University, completing a B.A. degree in 1997, and attended the Whitney Museum Independent Study Program the following year. In 1999, she moved to Los Angeles, where she studied with conceptual artists John Baldessari and Mary Kelly at the University of California, Los Angeles (UCLA) and earned an M.F.A. in 2002.

In her early career, Tribe exhibited in group shows at SculptureCenter, the New Museum, Orange County Museum of Art and Hirshhorn Museum and solo shows at LACE (2003), Kunstlerhaus Bethanien (Berlin, 2006) and 1301PE (2009, Los Angeles), among others. In 2010, she was selected for the Whitney Biennial. Subsequent solo exhibitions took place at venues including Camden Arts Centre (2011), The Power Plant (2012), Institute of Modern Art (Brisbane, 2014), SFMOMA (2017) and the Wellcome Collection (2021). She has had performances and film screenings at Tate Modern, MoMA, Walker Art Center, Getty Center and the New York, London and Rotterdam film festivals.

Tribe has taught at Art Center College of Design and UCLA and been a visiting faculty member at CalArts, Harvard University and Stanford University. She is married to artist Mungo Thomson.

== Work and reception ==
Tribe employs both fictive and documentary methods—for example, performance, testimonial, investigation and research—in her projects. Her approach often involves establishing collaborative dialogues and relationships with individuals across disciplines and communities including support groups, medical personnel, actors and scientists. While her projects largely arise out of subjects of interest to her—as with documentary works—they exhibit elements of artifice and fantasy, often using actors in unconventional ways to re-enact personal experiences, portray historical figures or embody social roles. Critics such as Martin Herbert suggest that rather than use film as a documentary tool, for Tribe it serves "a countermanding conception of unknowing and unraveling," in which notions of truth, recall, history and scientific rigor falter in the face of subjectivity.

Tribe's films and videos have screened independently and been exhibited as larger installations in conjunction with related photographs, works on paper and sculpture. Commentators identify her attention to the apparatus and form of various media and use of layering—of imagery, means of expression, objects or meanings—as hallmarks of Tribe's practice. The structure of individual works often arise out of the content; in various installations, she used the physical mechanics of cinematic projection or sound output to mirror cognitive processes that were being examined. Of the work's layering, Dan Adler wrote, "The value of much of Tribe’s oeuvre resides in the provocative and profound staging of relationships—between isolated words, textures, or objects on the one hand, and coherent narrative elements on the other—reflecting the subjective processes of memory and desire, and their susceptibility to a host of personal and societal pressures, including the ideological notion that there is one definitive version of the truth."

=== Early projects (2000–08) ===
Tribe's early work recreated personal experiences and recorded performative acts that posited memory and perception as fundamentally troubled processes subject to time, language and representation. For The Audition Tapes (1998) she filmed 15 actors delivering monologues and dialogues developed from transcribed interviews with four members of her immediate family about family history; the divergent accounts and exposed production seams (false starts and takes) pointed to the uncertainty of narrative conveyance and memory itself. She created a hazy autobiographical portrait in Double (2000), filming varied interpretations of her persona by actors she hired that resembled her. The split-screen work Here & Elsewhere (2002) considered the intersection between consciousness and exteriority—represented and real—through the thoughtful responses of a 10-year-old girl to philosophical questions about existence, space and time.

In other works, she engaged strangers in performative situations that revealed the subjectivity embedded in common experience. The silent, black-and-white film installation Untitled (Potential Terrorist) (2002) explored stereotyping and suspicion while paying homage to Warhol with a series of one-minute casting-call screen tests by 29 actors asked to project the demeanor of a terrorist. The book North Is West/South Is East (2002) delved into subjective perceptions of Los Angeles through a series of hand-drawn, often humorously inaccurate thumbnail memory-maps that Tribe solicited from visitors and locals at LAX Airport.

Kerry Tribe, H.M., Double projection of a single 16mm film, color and sound, 18:30 min., 2009, Installation view: Arnolfini, Bristol, 2009.

=== Projects, 2009–present ===
In later work, Tribe drew more directly upon the investigative impulse of documentary, considering the shifting nature of memory and its role in conceptions of the self, science and history. Her two-channel film installation H.M. (2009) focused on the well-known medical case of "Patient H.M.," a man who underwent experimental brain surgery for epilepsy in 1953 and was left with an episodic memory capacity lasting approximately twenty seconds. The subject of an exhaustive MIT study, his case is the source of much current knowledge about the physical basis of memory. Tribe recounted his story through layered interview fragments and photographs (ultimately revealed to be dramatizations), historical stills, stock and on-location footage, animation and text. In order to evoke H.M.'s condition, she looped a single strand of 16 mm film through two adjacent projectors with a twenty-second delay between them, creating for viewers a concrete experience of the cognitive dissonance of amnesia and the fragility of all memory.

In two installations, Tribe reflected on uncertainty, cultural memory and disinformation. The Last Soviet (2010) related the story of Sergei Krikalev, the cosmonaut stranded in orbit (largely ignored) on the Mir Space Station during the dissolution of the Soviet Union. The video intercuts shots of a model of Mir's interior that Tribe constructed, images of social unrest on the streets of Moscow, and archival footage of a performance of Swan Lake that was used to censor news broadcasts of the turmoil; the events were described in alternating, distanced narration by two actors in English and Russian. Milton Torres Sees a Ghost (2010) featured a looped audio interview with an American RAF pilot sent to shoot down a UFO in 1957, which was censored by the British military for more than 50 years. In the installation, a horizontal ribbon of magnetic tape extending across the wall was anchored by two reel-to-reel machines seventy feet apart, one recording and the other erasing the testimony in a cycle that evoked the disconnect between official history and lived experience.

Kerry Tribe, There Will Be _______, Video projection with sound, 30 min., Installation view, The Power Plant, Toronto, 2012.

Tribe explored reenactment further in two subsequent projects, transposing elements of existing films into new works. For Critical Mass (2010–13), she restaged Hollis Frampton's fragmented, experimental film of the same title as a live performance with two actors precisely reproducing from memory the looped phrasing, rhythmic repetitions and disjunctures of the original's algorithmic editing. The exhibition "There Will Be ________" and film Greystone (2012) examined a famous unsolved double murder that took place in 1929 at the Greystone Mansion in Beverly Hills, then California's most expensive home and later a popular film location. She pieced together an intricate script presenting five scenarios for the crime in which the dialogue was structured solely of words spoken in scenes from the 60+ films shot at the mansion. Filmed on location with actors in period dress, it moves between investigative pursuit, clichéd tropes of melodrama and surreal shifts of time and memory—juxtapositions that critics asserted simultaneously critique and celebrate film's ability to both purvey myth and reveal truth. Another LA-centric work, the public project Exquisite Corpse (2016), took a more directly documentary approach, using exploratory research to structure idiosyncratic vignettes into a single, flowing 51-minute conceptual tracing of the 51-mile Los Angeles River, beginning to end.

Subsequent projects extended Tribe's cognitive explorations in H. M. to consider communication and empathy. The video and sculpture exhibition "The Loste Note" (2015) centered on the communication disorder aphasia, which results from cerebral traumas such as strokes and reflects damage to the brain's language centers. The show's centerpiece was the three-channel video projection, The Aphasia Poetry Club (2015), which supplanted documentary's typical "talking head" format with loose, associative portraits combining narration by three people with aphasia, photography and animation. Its tri-part imagery conveyed the sense of information overload and difficulty of expression that aphasics experience through scenes with disorienting and obstructed perspectives; the projection was complemented by a series of mixed-media sculptures suggesting typical film production stands and supports bent out of shape and extruded into surreal, non-functional abstract forms.

The video installation Standardized Patient (2017, SFMOMA) examined the phenomenon of "Standardized Patients" (SPs)—actors who portray patients in a simulated clinical environment for training purposes. Tribe worked with professionals to develop four medical case scenarios, then filmed students taking personal histories from the SPs, intercutting the subtle, sometimes-fraught interactions with footage of a medical learning center and its simulation mannequins. The installation used an angled screen that presented the SP encounters on one side and a montage of supporting materials (patient script fragments, diagnostic charts, textbook illustrations) on the other, a metaphor for the gap between the emotional (patient) and factual (doctor) sides of the clinical experience.

In other works and exhibitions like "Onomatopoeia" (2022)—which describes words that mimic the sound they describe—Tribe considered gaps in understanding, within and between individuals, through the lens of phenomena that cross orders of cognition. The show included Prueba de colores y palabras, a grid of silkscreen prints listing colors in Spanish that were rendered in a rainbow of mismatched hues to recreate the neuropsychological Stroop effect—the processing delay people experience when confronted with incongruent stimuli. In the video Afasia, Tribe alternated between her own voiceover in halting Spanish and that of a friend with aphasia (in English), relating their struggles with fluency.

== Recognition ==
Tribe's work belongs to the public art collections of FRAC Limousin, FRAC Pays de la Loire, the Hammer Museum, Los Angeles County Museum of Art, Museum der Moderne Salzburg, MoMA, Orange County Museum of Art, SFMOMA, Stedelijk Museum voor Actuele Kunst (S.M.A.K.), Whitney Museum, and Yuz Museum, among others.

She has received fellowships and awards from the Durfee Foundation (2003, 2010), Louis Comfort Tiffany Foundation (2005), Creative Capital (2012), United States Artists (2012), Artadia (2013), California Community Foundation (2015) and Herb Alpert Foundation (2017). She has received artist residencies from the American Academy in Berlin, Atlantic Center for the Arts, Kunstlerhaus Bethanien and Stanford Arts Institute.
