= Fiona Banner =

British artist

Fiona Banner aka The Vanity Press
- Born: 1966 (age 59–60); Merseyside, England
- Education: Kingston University and Goldsmiths College
- Movement: Young British Artists
- Spouse: Nick Rosen
- Website: fionabanner.com

Fiona Banner (born 1966), also known as The Vanity Press, is a British artist. Her work encompasses sculpture, drawing, installation and text, and demonstrates a long-standing fascination with the emblem of fighter aircraft and their role within culture and especially as presented on film. She is well known for her early works in the form of 'wordscapes', written transcriptions of the frame-by-frame action in Hollywood war films, including Top Gun and Apocalypse Now. Her work has been exhibited in prominent international venues such as the Museum of Modern Art, New York and Hayward Gallery, London. Banner was shortlisted for the Turner Prize in 2002.

== Life ==
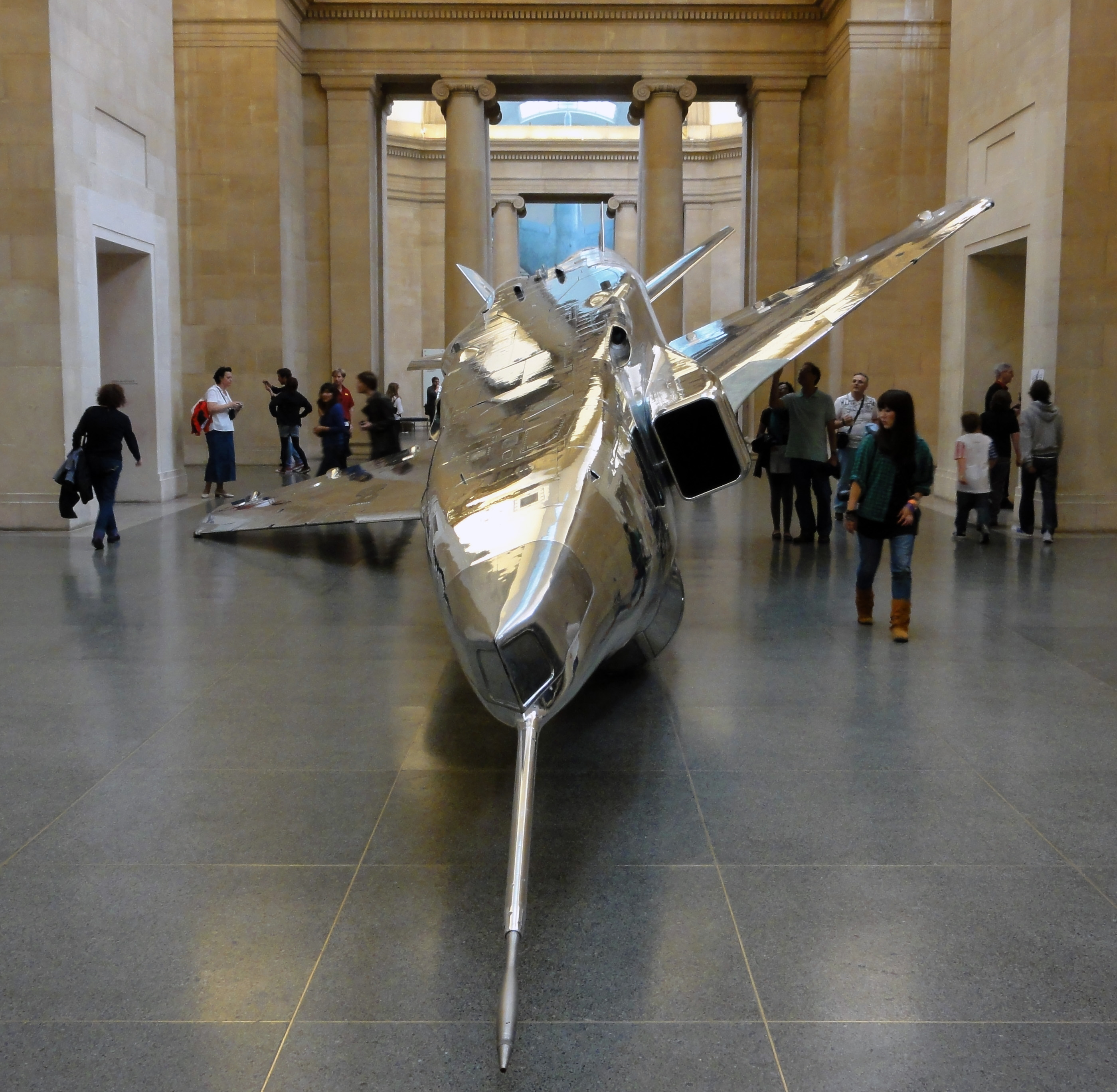
2010 Tate Britain exhibition of an RAF Jaguar installed by Banner.

Fiona Banner was born on Merseyside, North West England in 1966. She studied at Kingston University and completed her MA at Goldsmiths College of Art in 1993. The next year she held her first solo exhibition at City Racing. Since graduating from Goldsmiths College of Art, Banner has continued to evolve an important, considered and interrelated practice, rooted in language. Publishing, in the broadest sense, is central to her practice.

In 1995, she was included in General Release: Young British Artists held at the XLVI Venice Biennale.

Since 1994 Banner has created handwritten and printed texts – 'wordscapes' – that retell in her own words entire feature films, including Point Break (1991) and The Desert (1994), or particular scenarios in detail. Her work took the form of solid single blocks of text, often the same shape and size as a cinema screen. She also investigates the formal components of written language, giving significance to the symbols that punctuate sentences.

In 1997, when she published THE NAM, she started working under the imprint of The Vanity Press, and has since published an extensive archive of books, objects and performances, many questioning the notion of authorship and copyright. For Banner, the act of publishing is itself a performative one. Consequently, her work resits traditional notions of grandeur and exclusivity, instead deploying a pseudo formality that is playful and provocative. THE NAM is a 1,000-page book which describes the plots of six Vietnam films in their entirety: the films are Apocalypse Now, Born on the Fourth of July, The Deer Hunter, Full Metal Jacket, Hamburger Hill and Platoon.

Following her shows at the Neuer Aachener Kunstverein, and Dundee Contemporary Arts, Banner was nominated for the Turner Prize in 2002.

Since early 2000, Banner has been working with pornographic film as a basis for an exploration of our obsession with sex, and the extreme limits of written communication. In large, densely filled works she transcribe the varied sexual activities taking place in Asswoman in Wonderland, starring Tiffany Minx, who also directed this X-rated version of Alice's fictional adventures. Banner's own Arsewoman in Wonderland (2001), presented in the Turner Prize exhibition, is a 4 × 6 m printed description of the film pasted and layered sheet after sheet onto the wall like and overladen billboard. 'I wanted to make some work about sex but I couldn't describe it. I was too close to it and I did not have the words that close to hand. I looked again at ports as a way of investigating my own taboo. Just as with the war films I enjoyed it but found it hard to grasp; it was intimate yet distant, seductive yet sometimes repulsive. My response to the film was very emotional.' The Guardian asked, "It's art. But is it porn?" calling in "Britain's biggest porn star", Ben Dover, to comment. The prize was won that year by Lancastrian artist Keith Tyson.

In 2009 she issued herself an International Standard Book Number (ISBN 0-9548366-7-7), and registered herself as a publication under her own name. She was then photographed with the ISBN tattooed on her lower back.

In 2010, she was selected to create the 10th Duveen Hall commission at Tate Britain for which she transformed and displayed two decommissioned Royal Air Force fighter jets.

On 1 October 2010, in an open letter to the British government's culture secretary Jeremy Hunt—co-signed by a further 27 previous Turner prize nominees, and 19 winners—Banner opposed any future cuts in public funding for the arts. In the letter the cosignatories described the arts in Britain as a "remarkable and fertile landscape of culture and creativity."

Banner’s work includes sculpture, drawing and installation; text is the core of her oeuvre. She is one of the "key names", along with Jake and Dinos Chapman, Gary Hume, Sam Taylor-Wood, Tacita Dean and Douglas Gordon, of the Young British Artists.

== Other works ==
- Onyx, Bookman, Courier 2018 Full stop inflatables (Installation Breeder, Athens)
- SS19 The Walk (and Buoys Boys) 2018 High definition digital film (Installation Breeder, Athens)
- SS19 The Walk 2018 Performed at DRAFx: An Evening of Performances (o2 Kentish Town Forum, London)
- Buoys Boys 2016, Full Stop inflatables, Sculptural performance (De La Warr Pavilion, Bexhill-on-sea)
- Buoys Boys 2016, High definition digital film
- STAMP OUT PHOTOGRAPHIE 2014 (V-A-C collection Whitechapel Gallery, London)
- 1066 2012 Wall projection (Turner Contemporary, England)
- The Exquisite Corpse Will Drink the Young Wine 2012 Musical Performance / Screening (The Welsh Congregational Chapel, Borough, London)
- Performance Nude 2010 Performance with David Salas (Claire de Rouen / Other Criteria Book Launch, London)
- Mirror 2007 Performance with Samantha Morton (Whitechapel Gallery, London)

== Exhibitions ==
1994
Pushing Back The Edge of the Envelope, City Racing, London
1995
Viewing Room, Luhring Augustine Gallery, New York
1997
The Nam : 1000 page all text flick book, London
Only the Lonely, Frith Street Gallery, London
1998
Art Now, Tate Britain, London
LOVE DOUBLE, Barbara Thumm Gallery, Berlin
1999
Statements, Basel Art Fair
ASTERISK, Gesellschaft für Aktuelle Kunst, Bremen
Don't Look Back, Brooke Alexander, New York
THE NAM and Related Material, Printed Matter, New York
STOP, Frith Street Gallery, London
2000
Soixante-Neuf, Charles H Scott Gallery, Emily Carr Institute, Vancouver
2001
ARSEWOMAN, Murray Guy, New York
ARSEWOMAN, Barbara Thumm Gallery, Berlin
Rainbow, 24/7, Hayward Gallery, London
2002
My Plinth is Your Lap, Neuer Aachener Kunstverein, Aachen
My Plinth is Your Lap, Dundee Contemporary Arts, Dundee
2003
Fiona Banner, 1301PE, Los Angeles, CA
2006
Arsenal, Barbara Thumm Gallery, Berlin
Arsewoman in Wonderland, Barbara Thumm Gallery, Berlin
2007
Peace on Earth, Tate Britain, London
Every Word Unmade, Barbara Thumm Gallery, Berlin
The Bastard Word, Power Plant, Toronto
2010
The Naked Ear, Frith Street Gallery, London
Harrier and Jaguar, Tate Britain Duveens Commission 2010, Tate Britain, London
Tornado, Co-commission by Locus+ and Great North Run Culture, 2010, Newcastle
All the World's Fighter Planes, Musée d'art de Joliette, Québec
2011
Snoopy Vs The Red Baron, Barbara Thumm Gallery, Berlin
2012
Unboxing, The Greatest Film Never Made, 1301PE, Los Angeles
2013
The Vanity Press, Summerhall, Edinburgh (Catalogue)
2014
Wp Wp Wp, Yorkshire Sculpture Park, Wakefield
Mistah Kurtz, He Not Dead, PEER, London
2015
Scroll Down And Keep Scrolling, Ikon Gallery, Birmingham, UK
FONT, Frith Street Gallery, London
2016
Au Cœur des Ténèbres, mfc-Michele Didier, Paris, France
Buoys Boys, De La Warr Pavilion, Bexhill, UK
Fiona Banner, Barbara Thumm Gallery, Berlin
Scroll Down And Keep Scrolling, Kunsthalle Nürnberg, Germany
Fiona Banner, 1301PE, Los Angeles
Study #13. Every Word Unmade, Fiona Banner, David Roberts Art Foundation, London
2017
Runway AW17, De Pont Museum, Tilburg, Netherlands
2018
Buoys Boys, Mission Gallery, Swansea, Wales
2019
Fiona Banner aka The Vanity Press, Libby Leshgold Gallery, Emily Carr University of Art and Design, Vancouver, Canada
Fiona Banner aka The Vanity Press, Independent Art Fair, Barbara Thumm Gallery, New York, USA
Full Sea Stop Scape, Barbara Thumm Gallery, Berlin, Germany
2020
PERIOD, Museum Voorlinden, Netherlands
2021
Pranayama Typhoon, Barakat Contemporary, Seoul, Korea
