= Toba Khedoori =

Australian visual artist (born 1964)

- توبا خضوري
- Born: 1964 (age 61–62); Sydney, Australia
- Education: San Francisco Art Institute (BFA), University of California, Los Angeles (MFA)
- Known for: Mixed-media Painting
- Relatives: Rachel Khedoori (twin sister)

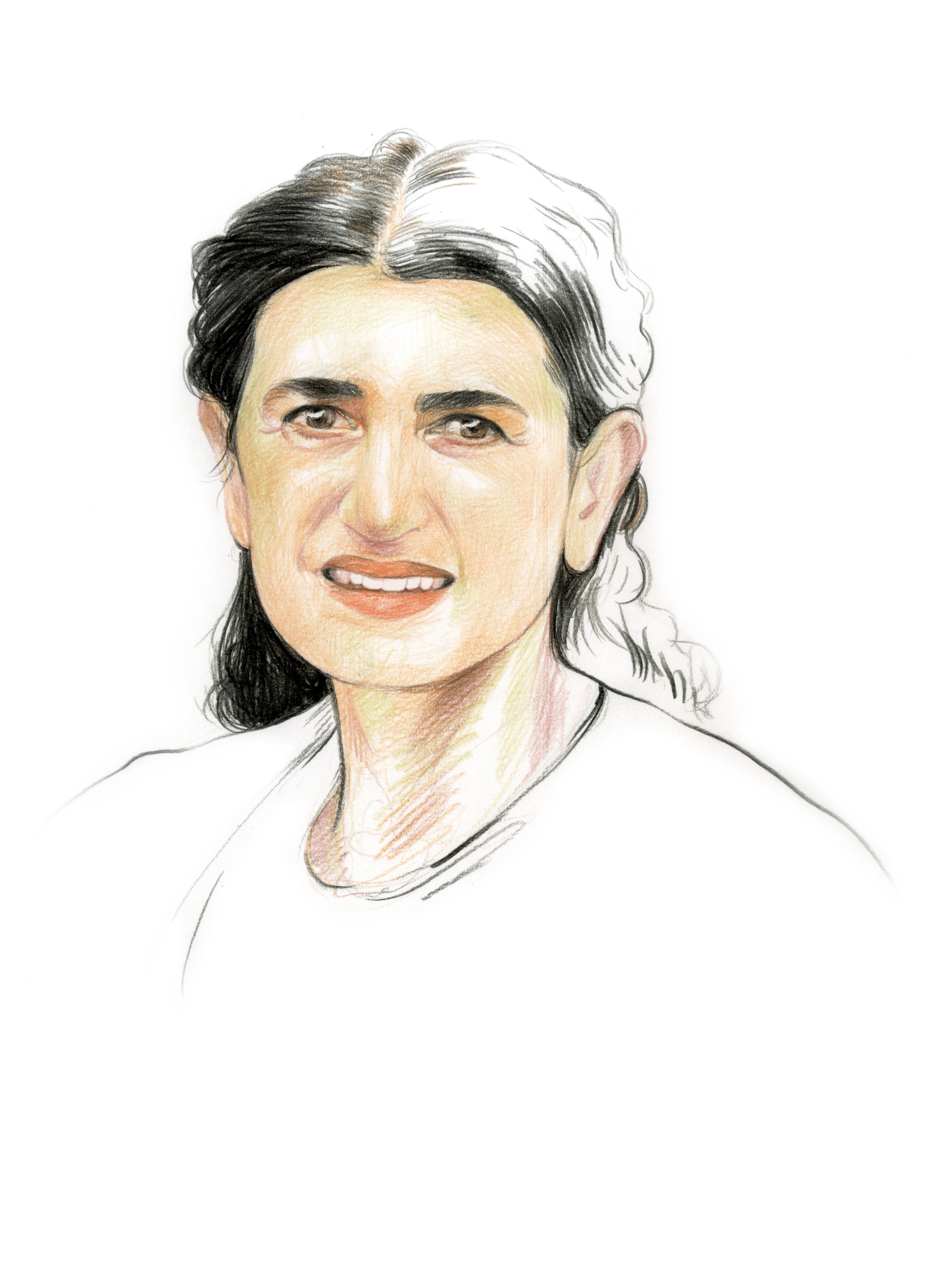
Toba Khedoori Portrait ©Caroline Andrieu

Toba Khedoori (Arabic: توبا خضوري; born 1964) is an Australian-born artist, of Iraqi–Jewish heritage. She is known for highly detailed mixed-media paintings executed on large sheets of wax-coated paper. She moved to the United States in 1988 for university, and lives in Los Angeles, California.

== Biography ==
Khedoori was born in 1964, in Sydney, Australia, of Iraqi–Jewish parentage and raised in Australia. She is the identical twin sister of artist Rachel Khedoori.

She received a BFA degree (1988), from San Francisco Art Institute; and a MFA degree (1994), from University of California, Los Angeles.

== Artwork ==
Characteristically, Khedoori's works have comprised intricate details, models or architectural renderings set within the broad expanses of waxed paper or linen. This delicate combination frequently necessitates close viewing which results, then, in the works filling the spectator's entire field of vision. In recent years, Khedoori's works have introduced inversions of the more usual black detail on white expanse, incorporated natural imagery and landscape, and also taken the form of dramatically smaller-scale works than those hitherto produced. Her most recent output has also moved from wax-on-paper into oil and canvas, with subject matter drawing influence from geometric sequences.

== Exhibitions ==
Khedoori began exhibiting in 1993, and was shown early in her career at the 1995 Whitney Biennial exhibition. Khedoori has since had solo exhibitions at the Museum of Contemporary Art, Los Angeles (2001); the St. Louis Art Museum; the Whitechapel Art Gallery (2001) in London; the Walker Art Center in Minneapolis; and the Hirshhorn Museum (1997) in Washington D.C., among others.

Khedoori's work is in the permanent collections of the Museum of Modern Art, the San Francisco Museum of Modern Art, the Whitney Museum of Art, the Museum of Contemporary Art, Los Angeles, and the Los Angeles County Museum of Art.

== Awards ==
Khedoori was awarded a MacArthur Fellowship in 2002, with US$500,000 awarded.

== See also ==
- Iraqi art
- Islamic art
- List of Iraqi artists
- List of Iraqi women artists
