= Uta Barth =

German-American photographer (born 1958)

- Born: 1958 (age 67–68); Berlin, Germany
- Education: University of California, Davis; University of California, Los Angeles
- Known for: Photography
- Awards: MacArthur Fellows Program
- Website: utabarth.net

Uta Barth (born 1958) is a contemporary German-American photographer whose work addresses themes such as perception, optical illusion and non-place. Her early work emerged in the late 1980s and 1990s, "inverting the notion of background and foreground" in photography and bringing awareness to a viewer's attention to visual information with in the photographic frame. Her work is as much about vision and perception as it is about the failure to see, the faith humans place in the mechanics of perception, and the precarious nature of perceptual habits. Barth's says this about her art practice: “The question for me always is how can I make you aware of your own looking, instead of losing your attention to thoughts about what it is that you are looking at." She has been honored with two National Endowments of the Arts fellowships, was a recipient of the John Simon Guggenheim Fellowship in 2004‑05, and was a 2012 MacArthur Fellow. Barth lives and works in Los Angeles, California.

== Early years and education ==
Barth was born in Berlin, Germany in 1958. Growing up in Europe gave Barth a different cultural perspective. Her memory of West Berlin is "dark and austere" and she left for the United States before the Berlin wall was taken down in 1989. During early adolescence her father began a research project in the U.S. at Stanford University and she moved to the U.S. shortly after. Barth was 12 years old and did not know English when she arrived in the United States. The shift from cold-war Germany to 1970s California was a culture shock for Barth.

Later, Barth's received her Bachelor of Arts degree from the University of California, Davis in 1982 and a Master of Fine Arts from the University of California, Los Angeles in 1985. From 1990 to 2008, she was a professor in the Art Department at the University of California, Riverside, until she was given the honorary title of Professor Emeritus in the Department of Art in 2008 to the present. She was also a visiting Graduate Faculty member at the Art Center College of Design, Pasadena, California, from 2000 to 2012 and has been a visiting professor at the University of California, Los Angeles. After receiving the MacArthur Fellowship in October 2012, she noted that she still plans to teach on a part-time basis because teaching forces her to "put language to" what she is thinking.

== Work ==
=== Early work: late 1980s & early 1990s ===
In 1989 Barth's work was black and white, multi-paneled photographic and painted images mounted on wood that addressed the psychodynamics of vision, using optic patterns, repetitious visual metaphors for the eye, and diagrams related to light and human vision. The multi-panel work set up formal relationships that would continue through Barth's artistic practice in later works. Barth explains that this early work was about “the confrontation with the camera, in the feeling of being looked at, blasted with light, being blinded, all as a physical experience.” In 1990, Barth continued to explore optic patterns and illusions in her works Untitled #11–14. This work includes four small photographs of houses that are encompassed in large fields of black and white strips, similar to that of static on a television screen and creates an optic vibration. The work intersects with the themes of photographic vision and the idea of the ‘gaze.’

=== Mid 1990s ===
Barth's work began to internalize the space between the viewer and the object in the mid 1990s, zooming in and zooming out, looking close and far away in her works like Untitled #13 (1991) and Untitled #16 (1990). She begins playing with the communication of space with in the work through landscape and abstracted text, and plays with the idea of how the perception of the works occurs within the human body viewing it. Pamela Lee says, “the self-consciousness of looking is grounded in subjective looking” in Barth's work. In Untitled #13, Barth includes a photograph of a landscape whose details are blurred to slow down the immediate understanding of the image by the audience. This effect describes the instability of one's visual field of vision, and becomes the basis for Barth's next series of works Grounds.

=== Grounds (1992–1995) ===
This body of photographs consists of over 50 images in different sizes and scales. These photos defy the conventional flat photographic image by being laminated prints that are then mounted on wood boards multiple inches thick, projecting the print away from the wall. As a result, the images of Grounds impersonate an object instead of a print. This plays into Barth's conceptual ideas for the body of work, referring to these photographs as “containers of information." Writer Darren Campion says, "Barth's work addresses that fundamental dissonance between the world as it is and the world as we see it, the chasms of perceived experience. This is extended to other areas of the photographic process as well – the main correlate of space being, of course, time, and its fluidity, which seems antithetical to our notion of what photography does." Barth made the images by photographing generic locations outdoors as if she was shooting a formal portrait but removed the subject of the portrait in focus and left the out-of-focus background behind. Barth's gesture reverses the typical use of the camera, shooting something out of focus instead of something in-focus. As a result, she photographs unoccupied space. Barth was thinking about stock photography while making this body of work, picturing backdrops for family photos and portrait photography from the 1960s and 1970s.

=== Fields (1995–1996) ===
In 1995 Barth began transitioning from her Grounds series into a new body of work known as Fields. She took her photographic approach in Grounds and turned it on its side, thinking about the site-specific relationship between the photograph and the physical space where it was made. This idea introduces motion into the work. Visual movement across the images in Fields creates a blur that is similar to that found in film and cinematic work. Fields produces the "illusion of filmic space and time" and Barth has said that she created this body of work in a similar way film producers scout locations for the perfect place to shoot a scene in a film.

In relation to her Field and Ground series, which depict blurred and empty foregrounds, Barth has stated: "I am interested in the conventions of picture-making, in the desire to picture the world and in our relationship, our continual love for and fascination with pictures."

=== Late 1990s ===
In 1998 Barth begins another series of Untitled works, including Untitled (98.4) and Untitled (98.6). Here, Barth begins to focus on sequencing in the gallery again, grouping images together in diptychs, triptychs and clusters. The work plays on the idea of multiple points of view or the experience of a visual double-take where a detail catches the viewer long enough to take a second image, a second look. To make this work, Barth would shoot multiple photographs in a row so that she could go back and edit the series of images to find the best photographs to pair together. This act re-introduces the notion of time into Barth's work. She begins spacing her panels of images on the wall in intervals to show gaps in time between shooting the photographs.

=== Early 2000s ===
Barth creates two of her most famous bodies of work during the same time period, nowhere near (1999) and …and of time (2000). Here, Barth interrogates the temporality of photography and the duration of vision. In nowhere near the camera records a repeated view out of Barth's living room window over multiple months. She made hundreds of images that contain moments of framing, records the ebb and flow of light and captures the change of the seasons. This body of work deals with the duration of looking and the prolonged engagement with "seeing" nothing. The series of work …and of time is the inverse series about the same window found in nowhere near. The images depict the light falling through the window, repeating grid like reflections of light that bounce and illuminate onto the wall and floor of Barth's living room. "The window becomes the aperture of the house and light and imagery project through it," Barth's says.

In 2002 Barth creates white blind (bright red). She deliberately sequences images, pairing anywhere from two, six or a dozen photographs of bare tree branches with white sky backdrops together. In contrast with the photographic panels are brightly colored panels of primary red, ox-blood, and a deep yellow scattered throughout the sequencing that break up the visual rhythm of movement from one image to the next. Instead of being drawn in by a single image, the viewer experiences a banned of images that flicker across the walls of the gallery in a horizon line of images. "A flickering of visual consciousness," Holly Myers, an art critic for the Los Angeles Times wrote in reference to the work. Optical illusion occurs, as the viewer walks through the sequencing of tree branches and interrupting red and yellow color panels interspersed throughout the photographic imagery, creating afterimages that strike the viewers eyes.

=== ...and to draw a bright white line with light (2011) ===
This series of work was commissioned by the Art Institute of Chicago in 2011 and marks a turn in Barth's work. In this series, Barth's intervention of her own body parts into the photographic frame to position the subject of the photograph is made visible. The viewer can identify Barth's arm or arm's shadow, as she creates the lines of light the camera captures in the series of photographs. This more recent work embodies Barth's idea of her own personal intervention into the space that she photographs. In previous series she aimed to spark observation and a sense of visual perception in the work. "Perhaps I have just discovered a way to make marks with light that fits into my ongoing practice," Barth's explains about the series in an interview with Art in America. This interview was in conjunction with a show Barth's had on view at gallery 1301PE in Los Angeles in September–October 2011. …and to draw a bright white line with light was shown at the Art Institute of Chicago May 14–August 16, 2011, as well as at Tanya Bonakdar Gallery in New York in October–December 2011.

== Collaborations ==
The Getty Museum commissioned eleven Los Angeles Artists for a collaborative exhibition titled Departures: 11 Artists at the Getty and Uta Barth was invited to participate. The exhibition was open to the public from February 29, 2000 through May 7, 2000. Each artist was commissioned to create works in response to art in the Getty's collection. Exhibition curator Lisa Lyons said, "Departures is intended to explore the potent and sometimes surprising ways in which the art of the past can inform contemporary art. Equally important, the new works produced for the exhibition will offer valuable insights into the Getty collections." The press release for the show gave a brief description of the each artists goals for their work, including Barth who planned to create a series of multi-panel photographs capturing variations of a single view of the interior of her home. These images where inspired by two artists represented at the Getty: the Impressionist painter Claude Monet (Wheatstacks, Snow Effect Morning, 1891) and environmental artist Robert Irwin (Central Garden, 1997).

== Group shows ==
Uta Barth has also participated in multiple group shows nationally and international. One group show she participated in was held at the Getty Museum in 2013. The titled of the exhibition was "At the Window: A Photographer’s View” and also included Gregory Crewdson and Yuki Onodera. Barth showed work from ‘nowhere near’ and ‘…and of time.’ This show articulates a theme and motif throughout Barth's work: the window. In an interview with the artists in the show, Barth's says, “The window is a wonderful vehicle for referring to the act of looking.” The exhibition displayed the contemporary artists work alongside art historical works like French inventor Joseph Nicéphore Niépce who took the world's first photograph in 1826.

== Selected exhibitions and collections ==
Her work has been featured in many exhibitions nationally and internationally, including Museum of Modern Art, New York; Metropolitan Museum of Art, New York; Museum of Contemporary Art, Chicago, Art Institute of Chicago; Henry Art Gallery, University of Washington, Seattle; the SCAD Museum of Art, Savannah; SITE, Santa Fe; Contemporary Arts Museum, Houston; Lannan Foundation, Santa Fe; and Museum of Contemporary Art, Los Angeles and Museum of Modern Art, Istanbul. "Uta Barth: Peripheral Vision", a large retrospective of her work, was shown at The Getty Center in 2022.

Barth's work is represented in numerous public and private collections worldwide, including the Whitney Museum of American Art, New York; The Museum of Modern Art, New York; The Solomon R. Guggenheim Museum, New York and Bilbao, Spain; The Tate Modern, London; Carnegie Museum of Art, Pittsburgh; Dallas Museum of Art, Texas; UCLA Hammer Museum, Los Angeles; Museum of Contemporary Art, Los Angeles; Museum of Contemporary Art, Chicago; Los Angeles County Museum of Art; The Getty Museum, Los Angeles; and The Walker Art Center, Minneapolis, among others.

== Monographs ==
- 2012 – Uta Barth. ... to draw with light. Blind Spot, New York.
- 2010 – Uta Barth: The Long Now. Greg R. Miller & Co., New York. Essays by Jonathan Crary, Russell Ferguson, and Holly Myers.
- 2006 – Uta Barth 2006: Just Spanning Time. Essay by Cheryl Kaplan Exh. cat. Minneapolis: Franklin Art Works.
- 2004 – Uta Barth: white blind (bright red). Santa Fe: SITE Santa Fe. Essay by Jan Tumlir.
- 2004 – Uta Barth. London: Phaidon Press. Essays by Uta Barth, Pamela Lee, and Jeremy Gilbert-Rolfe; interview with Matthew Higgs; and selected writings by Joan Didion.
- 2000 – Uta Barth: ... and of time. Artist's book. Essay by Timothy Martin. Published in conjunction with a project commissioned by the J. Paul Getty Museum, Los Angeles, for the exhibition "Departures: 11 Artists".
- 2000 – At the Edge of the Decipherable: Recent Photographs by Uta Barth. 2nd ed. Essay by Elizabeth A. T. Smith. Los Angeles: The Museum of Contemporary Art and St. Ann's Press.
- 2000 – Uta Barth: In Between Places. Seattle: Henry Art Gallery and University of Washington. Essays by Sheryl Conkelton, Russell Ferguson, and Timothy Martin.
- 1999 – Uta Barth: nowhere near. Artist's book. Essay by Jan Tumlir. Published in conjunction with a three-part exhibition project by the same name at ACME., Los Angeles; Bonakdar Jancou Gallery, New York; and Andréhn-Schiptjenko, Stockholm.
- 1999 – Uta Barth: nowhere near. Exh. brochure. Overland Park, Kansas: Johnson County Community College Art Gallery. Text by Jan Tumlir.
- 1995 – At the Edge of the Decipherable: Recent Photographs by Uta Barth. Essay by Elizabeth A. T. Smith. Los Angeles: The Museum of Contemporary Art.

== Selected grants and fellowships ==
- 2012 MacArthur Fellowship
- 2012 Anonymous Was A Woman Award
- 2010 Nominated for the 2011 Deutsche Börse Photography Prize
- 2007 Broad Art Foundation USA Artist Fellowship
- 2004–05 John Simon Guggenheim Fellowship
- 1996 Nominated Tiffany Award
- 1994–95 National Endowment for the Arts Visual Artist Fellowship
- 1995 AMI Grant (Art Matters Inc., New York), Visual Artist Fellowship
- 1992–93 AMI Grant (Art Matters Inc., New York), Visual Artist Fellowship
- 1990–91 National Endowment for the Arts, Visual Artist Fellowship
- 1983–84 National Arts Association

== See also ==
- List of German women artists
