= Paul Winstanley =

British painter and photographer

- Born: 1954 (age 71–72); Manchester, United Kingdom
- Education: Slade School of Fine Art, Cardiff College of Art
- Known for: Painting, photography, realism
- Website: Paul Winstanley

Paul Winstanley, Lounge A, oil on linen, 120cm x 112cm, 1997.

Paul Winstanley is a British painter and photographer based in London. Since the late 1980s, he has been known for meticulously rendered, photo-based paintings of uninhabited, commonplace, semi-public interiors and nondescript landscapes viewed through interior or vehicle windows. He marries traditional values of the still life and landscape genres—the painstaking transcription of color, light, atmosphere and detail—with contemporary technology and sensibilities, such as the sparseness of minimalism. His work investigates observation and memory, the process of making and viewing paintings, and the collective post-modern experience of utopian modernist architecture and social space. Critics such as Adrian Searle and Mark Durden have written that Winstanley's art has confronted "a crisis in painting," exploring mimesis and meditation in conjunction with photography and video; they suggest he "deliberately confuses painting's ontology" in order to potentially reconcile it with those mediums.

Winstanley has exhibited at institutions including the Tate, Museum of Contemporary Art, Los Angeles (MoCA LA), Irish Museum of Modern Art (IMMA), Royal Academy of Arts (London), Esbjerg Kunstmuseum (Denmark), Walker Art Center, and Museum of Contemporary Art, San Diego. His work belongs to the public collections of the Museum of Modern Art, British Council, MoCA LA, IMMA, and Tate, among others.

== Education and career ==
Winstanley was born in Manchester, United Kingdom in 1954. He attended Lanchester Polytechnic in 1972–3 before training in fine art at Cardiff College of Art (BA, 1976) and the Slade School of Fine Art (higher degree, 1978). His early paintings and works on paper focused on abstract structural principles and were influenced by American minimalist painters such as Brice Marden and Robert Ryman.

Winstanley appeared in early group shows at Whitechapel Gallery and House Gallery and solo exhibitions at Riverside Studios (1978) and Watermans Arts Centre (1987). After making a significant break into realist imagery based in photography, he received wider recognition in the 1990s through exhibitions at Kettle's Yard, Cambridge (where he was an artist-in-residence in 1992), Camden Arts Centre, Walker Art Gallery and Maureen Paley Interim Art in the United Kingdom, and CRG Gallery in New York, among others. In his later career he has had solo shows at the Tate and Cristea Roberts Gallery in London, Mitchell-Innes & Nash (New York), 1301PE (Los Angeles), Kerlin Gallery (Dublin), Galerie Vera Munro (Hamburg), and Galerie Andreas Binder (Munich), among others. In 2008, Artspace in New Zealand mounted a retrospective of his work.

== Work and reception ==
Since the late 1980s Winstanley's art has mainly focused on large, realistically rendered oil paintings that merge modernist aesthetics and postmodern investigation with two classical genres, the interior and the landscape. His work balances interests in processes of observation and depiction, the role of the viewer, and the psychology of quotidian, post-war communal spaces. Critics have described his style as an "indistinct naturalism" combining painterly softness and invisible technique, a meticulous dispassionate recording of observation and photographic detail (including flaws such as lens flare and the hazing of contours), and the subjective alteration of composition, light and color from source materials. His approach both points to its basis in photography and asserts independence from it, complicating the work's apparent claims to representation. ARTnews critic Barbara Pollack wrote that Winstanley's approach to landscape was "never entirely natural," but rather, "mediated by human presence, first when he picks up a camera and then brush and later when we, the audience, observe these scenes as invited intruders."

Paul Winstanley, Veil 20, oil on linen, 224cm x 213cm, 2007.

Winstanley's interiors center on archetypal, interchangeable, transitional spaces in which time passes slowly: institutional lounges and lobbies, waiting rooms, empty studios, corridors and walkways (e.g., T.V. Room, 1991; Lounge A, 1997); a 1998 Artforum review deemed them "mental images in a double sense": remembrances of things seen and depictions of potential, deferred interactions or situations. Writers have characterized the images, variously, as austere, contemplative, filled with ennui, and eerie, often relating their deserted melancholy to the Northern European painting tradition of artists such as Vermeer, Caspar David Friedrich and Vilhelm Hammershøi, or to Edward Hopper. Time Out critic Matthew Breen wrote that Winstanley's handling of cold light and geometric composition brings "a kind of romanticism to the most anonymous of spaces." His images often feature windows as a motif: screens partially obscured by translucent curtains, blinds, fog or mist that function like thresholds into surreal, uncanny parallel worlds, points of interpenetration between interior and exterior realities, or frames-within-frames recalling the Renaissance notion of paintings as windows (e.g., Nostalgia 2, 1999; Utopia 1, 2005).

Critics have noted how Winstanley employs certain methods—blurred imagery and repeated but subtly altered scenes that suggest the receding quality of memory and passing time—to introduce affect and temporality into his work and invite reflection. The quality of folding time and space is furthered by the scenes Winstanley chooses to portray: spaces of waiting or transition, whose vernacular, post-war utopian aesthetic has since been called into question, yet may inspire wistfulness. His paintings Lounge (Night) and Lounge A (1997) depict the Friedrich painting Wanderer above the Sea of Fog (1818)—an image of the back of a figure gazing into a foggy mountain landscape—wedged on a wall between windows in a lounge with seven vacant seats. Critics such as Simon Morley suggested that the paintings' changing luminosity, setting (a place to kill time), laborious photo-realist technique, and emphasis on viewing pointed to the "call of the transcendent, the potential of a liminal expanse of 'stretched time'" through which to contemplate "the spirituality of the aesthetic."

Paul Winstanley, Art School 28, oil on linen, 90cm x 60cm, 2014.

Winstanley began producing his "Veil" series in the late 1990s: diaphanous, translucent paintings of mainly vacant interiors focused on light streaming in through or blocked by wall-to-wall and sheer curtains, blinds and large plate-glass windows, which sometimes framed outdoor conditions such as mist. Critics described them as haunting, sometimes unsettling works that emphasised the transience of the interior-exterior relationship, either mediating views of landscape and bright outdoor light (Hub, 2000) or closing them off in ways suggesting the isolation of a cloister or cell (Viewing Room, 1997; Veil 20, 2007). In other images, Winstanley set generic built enclosures against the pastoral (for example, birch trees in idyllic rural settings or untamed brush), invoking a sense of the intrusion of one realm onto the other (e.g., Walter Gropius' Balcony, 2002; his 2005 exhibition, "Homeland", Kerlin Gallery).

In the early 2000s, Winstanley's paintings began to include occasional, solitary figures immersed in their own worlds. Standing in front of windows, slumped in front of televisions, or looking out of the picture, they generally faced away from the viewer, introducing a sense of voyeurism into the work. This figurative emphasis came to the fore in a 2011 exhibition at Mitchell-Innes & Nash, which included images such as Enclosure—a man in a gray suit sneaking a cigarette in the greenery abutting a boxy modern office building—or Jesus is Coming, which portrayed two men at the top of a park stairway gazing out of frame.

=== "Art School" project ===
In 2013, Winstanley's Art School was published, a monograph of photographs he had taken throughout the United Kingdom of anonymous, vacated art-school studios and classrooms, the bare, perspectival views suggesting an in-between place of history and possibility. The project formed the basis for a body of paintings—monochrome, vertical, compositions generally painted from multiple photographs in a grisaille technique that drew upon aspects of 17th-century Dutch interior painting and geometric abstraction. The images consisted of planes of white and gradations of gray punctuated by identifiable details of art-school activity: improvised partitioned spaces, battered and paint-dripped walls and floors, plastered-over drill holes, baseboard heaters, well-used sinks and random stackable chairs (e.g., Seminar (Grey) or Art School 28, 2014). Critics such as Artforum's Jan Astoff suggested the sense of absence and stillness in the paintings became "an occasion for heightened painterly nuance … subtle but compelling dramatisation of light" that was likened to works by Vermeer in which the captured reality of mediated spaces "dissolve into hazy reflections" upon closer observation.

Paul Winstanley, Situation 3, oil on gesso panel, 80cm x 86cm, 2020.

=== Later work ===
Winstanley's exhibition, "Faith After Saenredam And Other Paintings" (Kerlin Gallery, 2017), featured two new series: one depicting viewers observing paintings and another based on a sketch for a lost painting of the Mariakerk in Utrecht by the Dutch Golden Age painter of deserted church interiors, Pieter Saenredam. Critics characterised Saenredam's white, spare, austere paintings as virtuoso exercises in architectural perspective and formal purity that anticipate aspects of abstraction and minimalism—affinities he shares with Winstanley. They described Winstanley's re-imaginings of that work—which integrated re-interpretations and alterations of the site by both artists—as "a magnificent exercise in ambiguity"; Aidan Dunne wrote, "Seeing is believing, but the implication of these beautifully poised works is that our faith may be misplaced." The other series depicted scenes of paintings glimpsed from behind viewers, some of whom were moving and blurred as though by a long photographic exposure (e.g., Apostasy (Drift), 2017; Situation 3, 2020); the ephemerality of the figures contrasted with the static presentation of the artworks and conjured a Chinese box effect regarding the act of viewing.

In 2018, Winstanley's book, 59 Paintings was published, an episodic consideration of the process of thinking about and making work, undertaken through an alphabetical arrangement of individual paintings dating back three decades in his career; the Times Literary Supplement described the book as a portrayal of a self-reflective practice that "gestures towards interpretation, [but] pauses at the brink of revelation."

== Collections ==
Winstanley's work belongs to the public collections of the Arts Council of Great Britain, British Council, Colby College Museum of Art, Fonds national d'art contemporain (FNAC, Paris), Irish Museum of Modern Art, Museum of Contemporary Art, Los Angeles, Musee d'art Contemporain (Portugal), Museum of Modern Art, New York City Public Library, Southampton City Art Gallery, SACEM, and Tate, among others.
