= Jason Rhoades =

American artist (1965–2006)

- Born: July 9, 1965; Newcastle, California, United States
- Died: August 1, 2006 (aged 41); Los Angeles, California, United States
- Known for: Installation art
- Spouse: Rachel Khedoori
- Children: 1

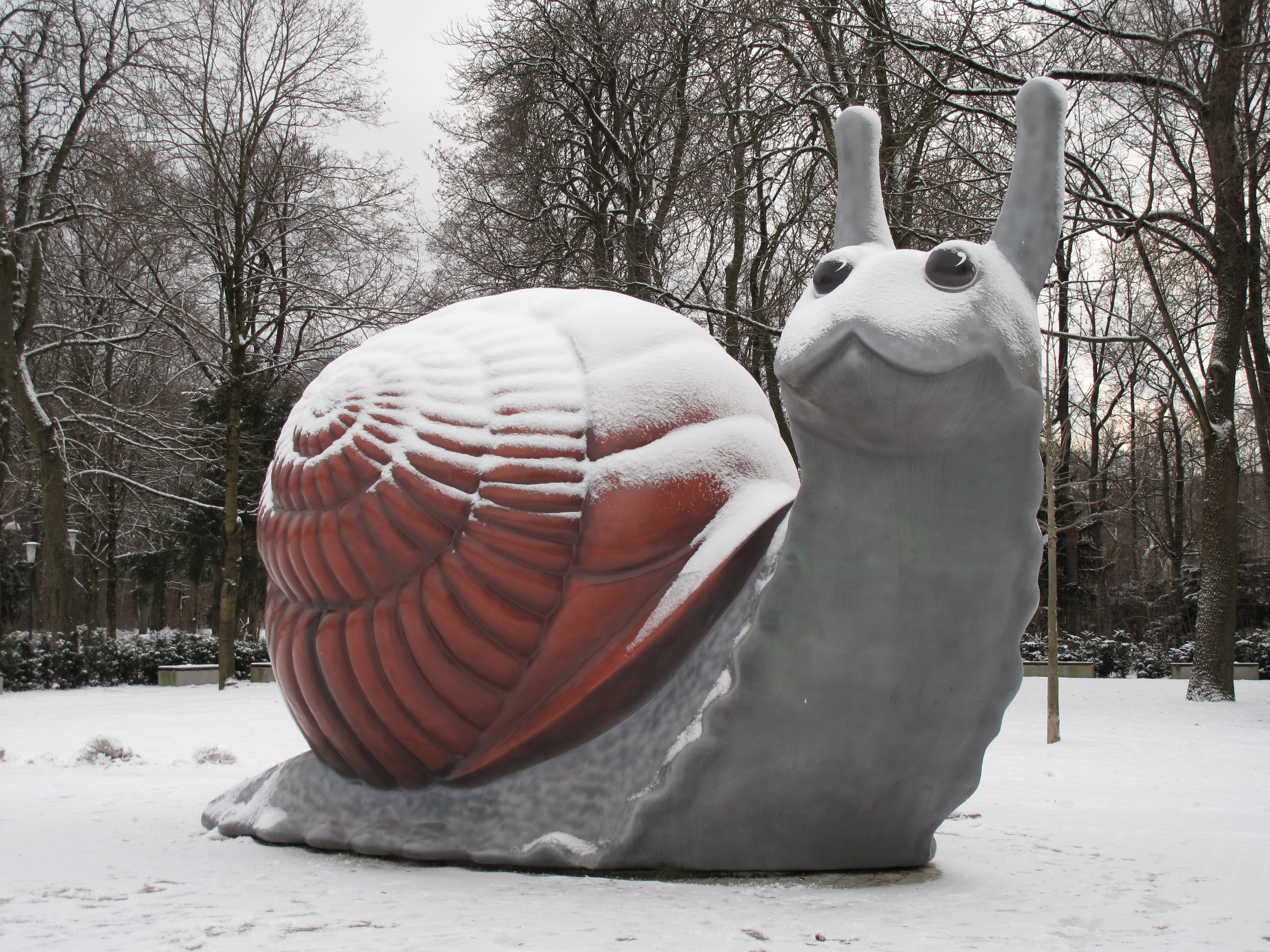
Sweet Brown Snail by Jason Rhoades and Paul McCarthy at the Bavariapark and the Verkehrszentrum of the Deutsche Museum in Munich

Jason Fayette Rhoades (July 9, 1965 – August 1, 2006) was an American installation artist. Better known in Europe, where he exhibited regularly for the last twelve years of his life, Rhoades was celebrated for his combination dinner party/exhibitions that feature violet neon signs (a form of word art) and his large scale sculptural installations inspired by his rural upbringing in Northern California and Los Angeles car culture. His work often incorporated building materials and found objects assembled with "humor and conceptual rigor." He was known for by-passing conventional ideas of taste and political correctness in his pursuit of the creative drive.

== Early life and education ==
Jason Fayette Rhoades was born July 9, 1965, in Newcastle, an incorporated community in Placer County, California.

Rhoades attended California College of the Arts in Oakland for one year, followed by study at the San Francisco Art Institute, where he earned a BFA degree in 1988. While attending SFAI, he studied under Irene Pijoan. In 1988, he attended Skowhegan School of Painting and Sculpture. Rhoades received his MFA degree from University of California, Los Angeles (UCLA) in 1993. He studied under Paul McCarthy at UCLA.

== Career ==
During his time at UCLA, Rhoades began making large-scale, chaotic, warehouse-like environments filled with accumulations of found, altered, and handmade objects. These multimedia assortments were assembled according to principles of free association, inspired by a combination of spiritual Eastern cultures in which he took interest, and popular Western cultures in which he lived. These works saw Rhoades adopt an alter ego and participate in his installations, influenced by Paul McCarthy's format of transgressive, intimate performance art.

Shortly after the completion of his graduate degree in 1993, Rhoades had his first solo exhibition at David Zwirner Gallery in New York City, New York. The following year in 1994, he had his first West Coast solo exhibition at Rosamund Felsen Gallery in Santa Monica, California.

From the mid-to-late 1990s Rhoades started to enjoy major success. In 1995, the artist made My Brother/Brancusi for the Whitney Biennial, one of the most important exhibitions of young art in the United States. Bearing an interest in modern sculptor Constantin Brancusi, Rhoades modeled the installation on Brancusi's studio as well as the way his brother Matt furnished his suburban California bedroom. Along with his family background and native terrain near Sacramento, twentieth-century art history was a constant thread in Rhoades’ work. His proximity to Los Angeles as well as his dealing with themes of consumer culture and machismo have garnered Rhoades comparisons to Mike Kelley, with whom he shared a connection through their mutual friend and mentor Paul McCarthy.

In addition to Los Angeles and New York, Rhoades began to more frequently exhibit in Europe amid the expansion of his success. His Perfect World installation, claimed by the artist to be the largest indoor sculpture ever made, opened in November 1999 at the Deichtorhallen museum, an industrial building that formerly served as the produce and flower market for the city of Hamburg. In the 15,000-square-foot space, Rhoades erected a scaffolding of aluminum tubes and metal clamps which support an overhead plywood platform.

Continuing his construction-based work, Rhoades exhibited PeaRoeFoam: My Special Purpose in 2002. Its namesake was a construction material developed by the artist himself which had been utilized in previous installations. In 2003's Meccatuna, the artist began to make significant use of neon signs spelling out euphemisms for "vagina," which would be heavily featured in his final installations. This marked the first work in his "Pussy Trilogy" series, which addressed the crossroads of East and West, sex, religion, and commerce. In 2006, Rhoades would display the last installment in the trilogy, Tijuanatanjierchandelier, at the Centro de Arte Contemporáneo in Málaga, Spain, his final major exhibition.

His work remains part of the permanent collection in the Rubell Family Collection in Miami, where he was a part of exhibit "Beg Borrow and Steal" at the time of his death.

== Personal life ==
Rhoades died August 1, 2006, in Los Angeles of heart failure. He was married to Australian-born artist Rachel Khedoori and they had a daughter named Rubi.

== Posthumous reception ==
Since his death, Rhoades has received additional recognition through numerous exhibitions and publications. In 2013, the Institute of Contemporary Art at the University of Pennsylvania hosted the first major survey exhibition of his work in the US, "Jason Rhoades: Four Roads." Four of the artist's installations took up the entire museum, and a publication by the ICA featured critical essays by Ingrid Schaffner, Martha Buskirk, Chris Kraus, and Paul Schimmel.

In 2014, David Zwirner presented PeaRoeFoam, the first exhibition that brought together multiple components of the artist's ongoing project of the same name. In 2015, The Rose Art Museum at Brandeis University produced "Multiple Deviations," an exhibition of Rhoades' work that included the first near-complete presentation of the artist's multiples, showcasing his large installations created from "the debris of popular culture." In 2017, Hauser & Wirth presented "Jason Rhoades. Installations, 1994-2006," the artist's first major exhibition in Los Angeles, the city where he lived and worked. Covering 2,600 square meters of space (28,000 square feet), the exhibition presented six of the artist's installations including Swedish Erotica and Fiero Parts (1994); My Brother/Brancuzi (1995); The Creation Myth (1998), My Madinah. In pursuit of my ermitage (2004); The Black Pussy...and the Pagan Idol Workshop (2005); and Tijuanatanjierchandelier (2006).

== Selected Installations ==
- 1991 Jason the Mason and the Mason Dickson Linea, University of California Los Angeles, Westwood
- 1991 More Moor Morals and Morass, Culver City, Los Angeles
- 1992 Jason & Jason Entrepreneurship (Redwood Decks and Furniture, Ceramics Repair, Small Animals for Admiration and Spelling Murals), University of California Los Angeles, Westwood
- 1991 Montgomery Ward Clinique Clinic, Rosamund Felsen Gallery, Los Angeles
- 1993 Garage Renovation New York (Cherry Makita), David Zwirner, New York
- 1993 Jason and Jackie Rhoades 13 Booth Cologne County Fair/Fair Blur, Unfair, Cologne
- 1993 Rhoades Construction, University of California Los Angeles, Culver City
- 1993 Young Wight Grand Prix, Wight Art Gallery and Murphy Sculpture Garden, University of California Los Angeles, Westwood
- 1994 P.I.G. (Piece in Ghent), Museum van Hedendaagse Kunst, Ghent
- 1994 Swedish Erotica and Fiero Parts, Rosamund Felsen Gallery, Los Angeles
- 1995 My Brother/Brancusi, Whitney Museum of American Art, New York
- 1996 Uno Momento/The Theater in My Dick/A Look to the Physical/The Ephemeral, Kunsthalle Basel
- 1996 Frigidaire (Cold Wind), Wanås Konst, Sweden
- 1996 Deviations in Space, VariousVirgins, David Zwirner, New York
- 1998 A Few Free Years: The History of the Joystick, the Button, the Knob, and the Coinslot, Secession, Vienna
- 1998 The Creation Myth, Galerie Hauser & Wirth, Zurich
- 1999 Perfect World, Deichtorhallen Hamburg
- 2000 Sutter's Mill, David Zwirner, New York
- 2001 The Costner Complex (Perfect Process), Portikus, Frankfurt
- 2002 Liver Pool, Tate Liverpool
- 2002 PeaRoeFoam: My Special Purpose, Museum Moderner Kunst Stiftung Ludwig, Vienna
- 2003 Meccatuna, David Zwirner, New York
- 2004 My Madinah: In Search of My Ermitage, Sammlung Hauser & Wirth in der Lokremise, St. Gallen, Switzerland
- 2006 Black Pussy Soirée Cabaret Macramé, 3113 Beverly Boulevard, Los Angeles
- 2006 Tijuanatanjierchandelier, Centro de Arte Contemporáneo, Málaga, Spain
