= Rachel Khedoori =

Australian artist (born 1964)

- Born: 1964 (age 61–62); Sydney, Australia
- Education: San Francisco Art Institute, University of California, Los Angeles
- Spouse(s): Jason Rhoades (1989-2006, his death)
- Children: Rubi Roads
- Relatives: Toba Khedoori (twin sister)

Rachel Khedoori (born 1964 in Sydney, Australia) is a contemporary artist of Iraqi Jewish heritage based in Los Angeles and known primarily for her mixed use of sculpture, film and architecture.

== Biography ==
Khedoori was born in Sydney and raised in Australia. She is the identical twin sister of the artist Toba Khedoori, and the sister of David Khedoori. She is also the widow of artist Jason Rhoades.

Khedoori received her BFA from San Francisco Art Institute in 1988. She received her MFA from the University of California, Los Angeles, in 1994. She was a visiting professor at the Academy of Art, Malmö, Sweden in 1996. Khedoori began exhibiting in 1994, a joint debut show with her sister, Toba Khedoori. Her first complete solo show gained international attention at Kunsthalle Basel and Kunstverein Braunschweig in 2001. Her exhibition in Basel focused on film projected onto 2-D and 3-D objects. Rachel's work blends life and the abstract use of film, sculpture and installation.

Khedoori has lived and worked in Los Angeles, California, since 1990.

== Exhibitions ==
- Untitled (Blue Room), David Zwirner Gallery, New York City, New York (1999)
- Rachel Khedoori, Kunsthalle Basel, Basel, Switzerland (2001)
- Untitled (Iraq Book Project), Hauser & Wirth, London, England (2008)
- Untitled (Iraq Book Project), The Box, Los Angeles, California (2009)
- Paul McCarthy's Low Life Slow Life: Part 2, CCA Wattis Institute, San Francisco, California (2011)
- Untitled, Gisela Capitain, Cologne, Germany (2011)
- Rachel Khedoori, Hauser & Wirth New York, New York City, New York (2015)

== See also ==
- Iraqi art
- List of Iraqi artists
- List of Iraqi women artists
