= Sarah Seager =

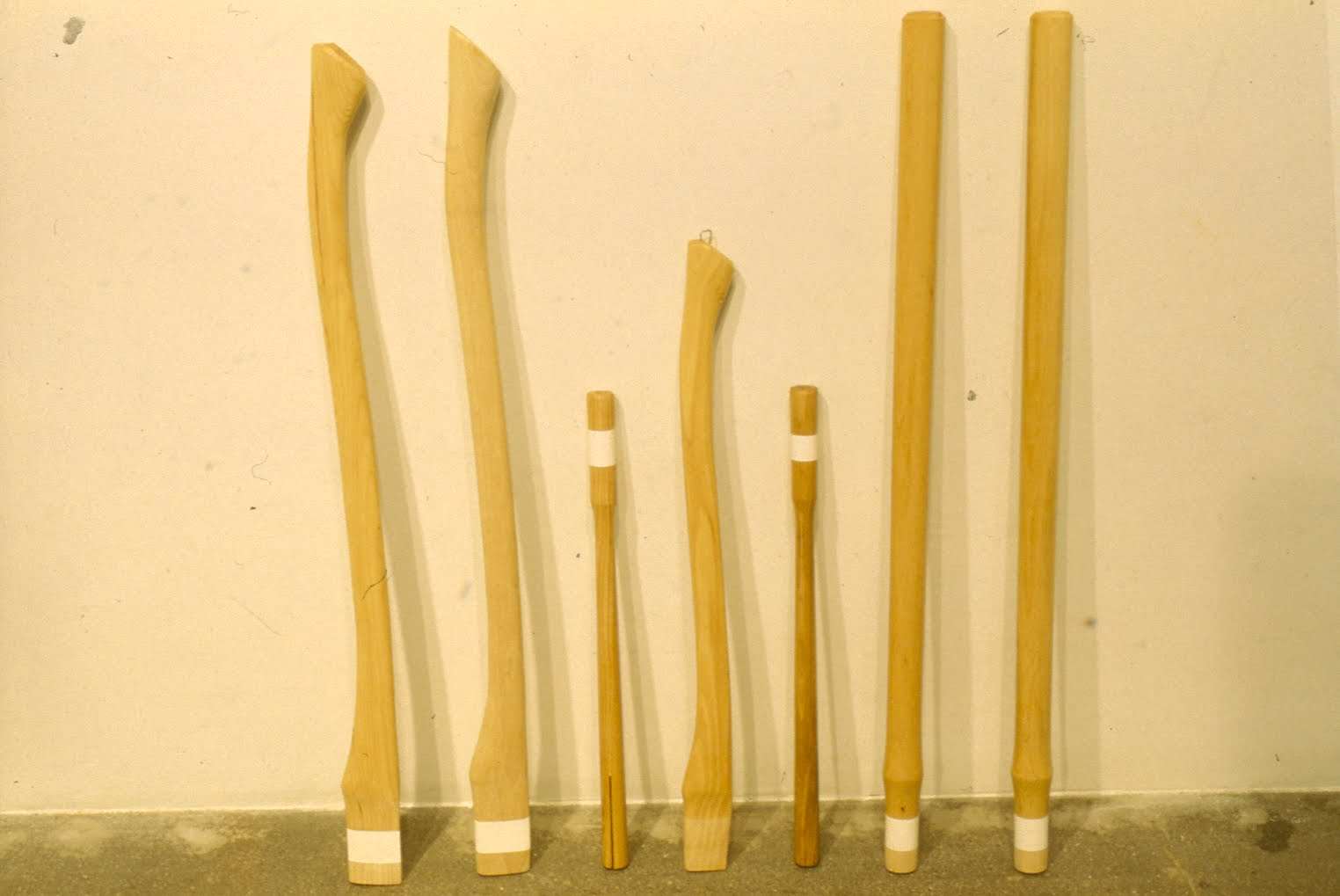
- Axe Handles, 1991
- Born: January 1958 (age 68); Springfield, Massachusetts
- Education: University of California, Berkeley, University of California, Los Angeles
- Movement: Conceptual art
- Awards: Nominated for a Louis Comfort Tiffany Award, 2011

Sarah Seager (born 1958) is a conceptual artist associated with the California Conceptualism movement of the late 1980s through mid-1990s based out of Los Angeles, California. She is known for making "clean works, many of them white, in which objects seem not so much removed from function as between functions" as described by Michael Brenson of The New York Times. She is also known for her published art work by the title "Excuse my Dust" that was done in conjunction with the curators of the Smithsonian Institution.

== Life ==
Sarah Seager was born in January, 1958, and is the second child of David and Gretchen Seager. She lived for brief periods in Massachusetts, Florida, Texas, then Southern California, where she currently resides. Sarah received her Bachelor of Arts with Honors, at the University of California, Berkeley, in Spring of 1982. She was awarded a Master of Fine Arts from the University of California, Los Angeles in the spring of 1987.

== Solo exhibitions ==
2002

- 188 loose elements, things like...., LACE - Los Angeles Contemporary Exhibitions, Los Angeles, CA

1999

- The World Of Sculpture, (theater of invisibles), - Galerie Michael Janssen - Köln, Cologne (closed, 2007)

1998

- Proposal for installation with sarong pants, Claremont Graduate University (catalogue)

1995

- Proposals, Tanja Grunert Gallery, Cologne, Germany

1994

- Proposals, 1301PE Santa Monica, California

1993

- Excuse My Dust, 1301PE Santa Monica, California

1992

- New California Artist XX: Sarah Seager - Orange County Museum of Art, Newport Beach, California

1991

- Luhring Augustine, New York, New York
- Burnett Miller Gallery, Los Angeles, California

1989

- Dennis Anderson Gallery, Los Angeles, CA

== Collections ==
- Museum of Contemporary Art, Los Angeles
- San Francisco Museum of Modern Art
